= Index of underwater diving: S =

Alphabetical listing of underwater diving related topics

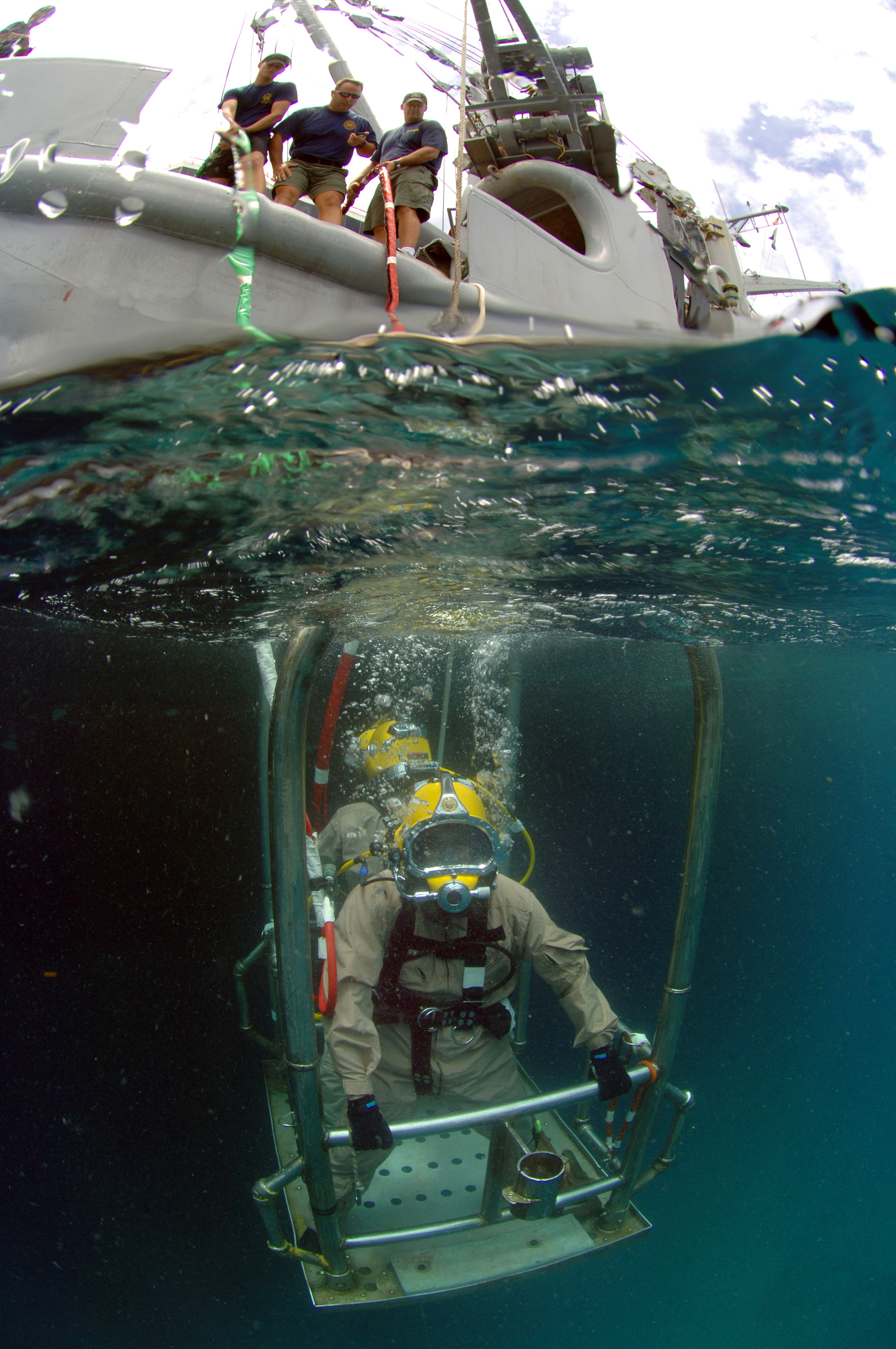
Surface-supplied divers riding a stage to the underwater workplace

The following index is provided as an overview of and topical guide to underwater diving: Links to articles and redirects to sections of articles which provide information on each topic are listed with a short description of the topic. When there is more than one article with information on a topic, the most relevant is usually listed, and it may be cross-linked to further information from the linked page or section.

Underwater diving can be described as all of the following:

- A human activity – intentional, purposive, conscious and subjectively meaningful sequence of actions. Underwater diving is practiced as part of an occupation, or for recreation, where the practitioner submerges below the surface of the water or other liquid for a period which may range between seconds to order of a day at a time, either exposed to the ambient pressure or isolated by a pressure resistant suit, to interact with the underwater environment for pleasure, competitive sport, or as a means to reach a work site for profit or in the pursuit of knowledge, and may use no equipment at all, or a wide range of equipment which may include breathing apparatus, environmental protective clothing, aids to vision, communication, propulsion, maneuverability, buoyancy control and safety equipment, and tools for the task at hand.

There are seven sub-indexes, listed here. The tables of content should link between them automatically:

- Index of underwater diving: A–C
- Index of underwater diving: D–E
- Index of underwater diving: F–K
- Index of underwater diving: L–N
- Index of underwater diving: O–R
- Index of underwater diving: S
- Index of underwater diving: T–Z

== S ==
Contents: Top	0–9	A	B	C	D	E	F	G	H	I	J	K	L	M	N	O	P	Q	R	S	T	U	V	W	X	Y	Z

Section contents: Top of section, Sa–Sb, Sc–Sd, Se, Sh, Si–Sj, Sk, Sl, Sm, Sn, So, Sp–Sr, St, Su, Sw, Sy

=== Sa–Sb ===
- Safety culture – Risk-averse attitudes
- Safety data sheet, also known as material safety data sheet (MSDS) – Sheet listing work-related hazards of a product or substance
- Safety diver – Support diver for a freediver
- Safety sausage – Inflatable buoy used by a diver at the surface to indicate position to the dive boat
- Safety stop – Optional decompression stop to reduce decompression stress
- Salt spray aspiration – Inhalation of salt water droplets
- Salt water aspiration syndrome – Diving disorder caused by inhaling small quantities of salt water
- Salvage diving – Diving work associated with the recovery of vehicles, cargo and structures
- Salvage of the SS Egypt's gold – Recovery of bullion from wreck using an atmospheric pressure observation bell
- Salvage operations on HMS Royal George, also known as Salvage work on the wreck of HMS Royal George – Early salvage operations using bells and surface supplied divers
- Sappers Divers Group – Portuguese Navy's diving unit
- Saturation diver – Diver registered as competent for saturation diving
- Saturation diving – Diving mode and decompression technique
- Saturation diving skills – Surface-supplied diving skills specific to saturation operations
- Saturation diving system – Facility for supporting saturation diving projects
- Saturation diving team – Personnel supporting a saturation diving operation
- Saturation spread – The topside base for saturation diving operations
- Saturation system – Diving decompression system
- Save Ontario Shipwrecks (SOS) – A provincial heritage NGO in Ontario, Canada
- Savoie, Joe – Diver and inventor of diving helmets
- Saw-tooth dive profile – Dive with several ascents and descents
- S-BRUV – Stereoscopic baited remote underwater video

=== Sc–Sd ===
Section contents: Top of section, Sa–Sb, Sc–Sd, Se, Sh, Si–Sj, Sk, Sl, Sm, Sn, So, Sp–Sr, St, Su, Sw, Sy

- A. Schräder's Son – US Manufacturer of diving equipment
- Science of underwater diving – Scientific concepts that are closely associated with underwater diving
- Scientific committee of CMAS – Committee of the World Underwater Federation
- Scientific diver training – Training divers who will be doing scientific work underwater
- Scientific diving – Use of diving techniques in the pursuit of scientific knowledge
- Scientific saturation diving – Saturation diving for scientific purposes
- SCMBA – British military rebreather
- Scorpio ROV – Work class remotely operated underwater vehicle
- Scottish Sub Aqua Club (ScotSAC)
- Scour, also known as hydrodynamic scour – Removal of sediment near an obstruction by swiftly moving water
- Screw gate carabiner – Carabiner snap hook with screw lock gate
- Scrubber breakthrough – Failure mode in rebreathers when the carbon dioxide scrubber is exhausted
- Scrubber canister – Container for chemicals used to remove carbon dioxide from breathing gas
- Scrubber endurance – The duration that a rebreather scrubber can adequately remove carbon dioxide
- Scuba configuration – The arrangement of self contained breathing apparatus carried by a diver
- Scuba contents gauge – Submersible pressure gauge for scuba cylinders
- Scuba cylinder valve – Valve controlling flow of breathing gas into and out of a scuba cylinder
- Scuba cylinder reserve valve – Scuba cylinder valve that retains a given pressure for emergency use
- Scuba depth record attempts – Attempting to push the boundaries in a very high risk activity
- Scuba diving – Swimming underwater, breathing gas carried by the diver
- Scuba diving equipment – Equipment needed for scuba diving
- Scuba diving fatalities – Deaths occurring while scuba diving or as a consequence of scuba diving
- Scuba diving in the Cayman Islands – Recreational diving tourism destination
- Scuba Diving International (SDI) – Recreational diver training and certification agency
- Scuba diving procedure – Skill required to scuba-dive safely
- Scuba diving quarry – Disused and flooded quarry repurposed for underwater diving
- Scuba diving regulator – Device to supply breathing gas on demand to a scuba diver
- Scuba diving skills – The skills required to dive safely using self-contained underwater breathing apparatus
- Scuba diving therapy – Treatment using scuba diving activities
- Scuba diving tourism – Industry based on recreational diver travel
- Scuba Educators International (SEI) – Recreational diver training and certification agency
- Scuba emergency procedures, also known as scuba emergency skills – Standard procedures for use in common scuba diving emergencies
- Scuba endurance – How long a diver can breathe from a given scuba set, taking dive profile and activity into account
- Scuba equipment – Equipment needed for scuba diving
- Scuba fatalities – Deaths occurring while scuba diving or as a consequence of scuba diving
- Scuba finswimming – Underwater sport discipline
- Scuba gas blender – Person competent to blend breathing gases for scuba diving
- Scuba gas consumption – Breathing gas used while scuba diving
- Scuba gas management – Logistical aspects of scuba breathing gas
- Scuba gas monitoring – Keeping track of available breathing gas quantities
- Scuba gas planning – Estimation of breathing gas mixtures and quantities required for a planned dive profile
- Scuba gas reserve – Breathing gas reserved for contingencies
- Scuba gear – The equipment used by a scuba diver for diving
- Scuba harness – Equipment for supporting a scuba set on a diver
- Scuba isolation manifold – Component used to functionally connect and disconnect scuba cylinders
- Scuba manifold – Scuba component used to functionally connect diving cylinders
- Scuba mouthpiece – Bite grip breathing interface on demand valve
- Scuba orienteering – Underwater compass navigation and speed competition on scuba.
- Scuba procedures – Standardised methods for scuba diving activities
- Scuba refresher course – Coaching to restore skills and knowledge
- Scuba regulator – Mechanism that controls the pressure of a breathing gas supply for scuba diving
- Scuba regulator hose swivel – Connector between hose and first or second stage regulator allowing additional rotation
- Scuba replacement – Surface-supplied diving mode using only gas supplied from high pressure cylinders
- Scuba reserve valve – Scuba gas supply valve which is opened to release the gas held in reserve
- Scuba Schools International (SSI) – Recreational scuba and freediving training and certification agency
- Scuba set – Self-contained underwater breathing apparatus
- Scuba skills – Skills required to scuba-dive safely
- Scubapro – Brand of scuba diving equipment
- SDBA – Special duty oxygen breathing apparatus, a military rebreather.
- SDI Computer Diver – Course for divers trained only on dive tables
- SDI Solo Diver – Original recreational certification specifically for solo diving

=== Se ===
Section contents: Top of section, Sa–Sb, Sc–Sd, Se, Sh, Si–Sj, Sk, Sl, Sm, Sn, So, Sp–Sr, St, Su, Sw, Sy

- Seabed mining – Extracting minerals from the seabed
- Seabed tractor – Special purpose class of remotely operated underwater vehicle
- Sea Dragon-class ROV – Chinese deep diving work class remotely operated underwater vehicle
- Seafox drone – Remotely operated anti-mine marine drone
- Seaglider – Deep diving autonomous underwater vehicle for long term missions
- SeaKeys – Collaborative marine biodiversity project in South Africa
- SEALAB – Experimental underwater habitats developed by the United States Navy
- SEAL Delivery Vehicle – Manned wet submersible for deploying naval special forces
- Sea level atmospheric pressure – Static pressure exerted by the weight of the atmosphere at sea level
- SeaPerch – Remotely operated underwater vehicle educational program
- Sea Pole-class bathyscaphe – Chinese bathyscaphe class
- Sea Research Society – American nonprofit for marine research
- SEAL Delivery Vehicle (SDV) – Manned wet submersible for deploying naval special forces
- Search and recovery diver – Diver certified as trained in underwater search and recovery
- Willard Franklyn Searle – US Navy ocean engineer and developer of diving and salvage equipment and systems
- Seasickness, also known as motion sickness – Motion sickness occurring at sea
- Secondary regulator second stage – Second demand valve on a scuba regulator first stage
- Secondary scuba second stage – Demand valve for emergency use
- Self-propelled hyperbaric lifeboat (SPHL) – Powered hyperbaric evacuation unit
- Self-reliant diver – Recreational diving certification
- Self-reliant diving – Philosophy and practice of diving that does not rely on assistance
- Self-rescue diver – Recreational diving certification
- Self-sufficient diver – Recreational diving certification
- Self-sufficient diving – Scuba diving with skill and equipment to manage most contingencies without assistance
- Semi-closed circuit diving – Underwater diving with a gas extender system
- Semi-closed circuit rebreather – Breathing apparatus that partially recirculates the gas
- Semi-submersible platform – Marine vessel used in offshore roles with good stability and seakeeping
- Sentry (AUV) – Autonomous underwater vehicle
- Sewer diving – Diving for maintenance work in sewers

=== Sh ===
Section contents: Top of section, Sa–Sb, Sc–Sd, Se, Sh, Si–Sj, Sk, Sl, Sm, Sn, So, Sp–Sr, St, Su, Sw, Sy

- Shadow Divers – Book by Robert Kurson recounting the discovery of a World War II German U-boat wreck
- Shallow-water blackout, also known as shallow water blackout – Loss of consciousness at a shallow depth during a dive
- Shallow Water Combat Submersible – Manned submersible and a type of swimmer delivery vehicle
- Shallow-water diving helmet, also known as shallow water helmet – Open-bottom diving helmet held on by weight
- Shark baiting – Attracting sharks by chumming the water
- Shark cage diving – Diving inside a protective cage to observe sharks in the wild
- Shark-proof cage – A metal structure to protect divers and snorkellers from potentially dangerous sharks
- Shark River Reef – Artificial reef off New Jersey
- Shark tourism – Tourism industry for viewing wild sharks
- Shayetet 13 – Special operations unit of the Israeli Navy
- Shearwater Research – Canadian manufacturer of dive computers and rebreather electronics
- Shilling, Charles Wesley – U.S. Navy physician, researcher, and educator
- Ships husbandry – Maintenance and upkeep of ships
- Ships husbandry diving – Diving related to the maintenance and upkeep of ships
- Shot-line, also known as shot line or shotline – Substantial weighted near-vertical line with buoy

=== Si–Sj ===
Section contents: Top of section, Sa–Sb, Sc–Sd, Se, Sh, Si–Sj, Sk, Sl, Sm, Sn, So, Sp–Sr, St, Su, Sw, Sy

- Sidemount – Diving equipment configuration where scuba sets are clipped to the diver's sides
- Sidemount diver – Scuba certification for using scuba sets clipped to the sides of the harness
- Sidemount diving – Diving using equipment configuration where scuba sets are clipped to the diver's sides
- Sidemount harness – System connecting the sidemount scuba sets to the diver
- Sidemount rebreather – Diving rebreather designed to be mounted at the side of the diver
- Side-mount cylinder – Scuba set configuration
- Side-mount scuba – Scuba sets carried clipped to the sides of the diver's harness
- Side-slung bailout set – Bailout cylinder clipped to the side of the diver's back-mount cylinder harness
- Siebe, Augustus – British engineer mostly known for his contributions to diving equipment
- Siebe Gorman – British manufacturer of diving equipment and salvage contractor
- Siebe Gorman CDBA – Type of diving rebreather used by the Royal Navy
- Siebe Gorman Salvus – Industrial rescue and shallow water oxygen rebreather
- Signal tube – Inflatable buoy used by a diver at the surface to indicate position to the dive boat
- List of signs and symptoms of diving disorders – Evidence of physiological disorders resulting from underwater diving
- Silent bubbles – Asymptomatic decompression bubbles
- The Silent World – 1956 French documentary film co-directed by Jacques Cousteau and Louis Malle
- The Silent World: A Story of Undersea Discovery and Adventure – Book by Jacques-Yves Cousteau and Frédéric Dumas
- Silt out, also known as siltout, or silt-out – Reduction of underwater visibility by disturbing silt deposits
- Silt screw – A peg for insertion into soft sediment to locate a distance line
- Single atmosphere diving suit – Articulated pressure resistant anthropomorphic housing for an underwater diver
- Single-hose diving regulator, also known as single hose – Regulator with two stages connected by a low-ressure hose
- Single point of failure – Part whose failure will disrupt the entire system
- The Silent World: A Story of Undersea Discovery and Adventure – Book by Jacques-Yves Cousteau and Frédéric Dumas
- Siluro San Bartolomeo – Italian manned torpedo design of late WWII
- Single point of failure – Part whose failure will disrupt the entire system
- Sinking of MV Conception – 2019 maritime disaster
- Sinking of the Rainbow Warrior – 1985 covert attack by French foreign intelligence service on a Greenpeace ship
- Sinking ships for wreck diving sites – Scuttling old ships to produce artificial reefs
- Sinus squeeze – Barotrauma of the sinuses
- Sistema Huautla – Cave system in Oaxaca, Mexico
- Sistema Nohoch Nah Chich – Flooded cave system in Mexico
- Sistema Ox Bel Ha – Flooded cave system in Quintana Roo, Mexico
- Situation awareness – Adequate perception of environmental elements and external events
- Siva (rebreather) – Range of military rebreathers
- SJT-class ROUV – Series of Chinese remotely operated underwater vehicles

=== Sk ===
Section contents: Top of section, Sa–Sb, Sc–Sd, Se, Sh, Si–Sj, Sk, Sl, Sm, Sn, So, Sp–Sr, St, Su, Sw, Sy

- Skandalopetra diving – Freediving using a stone weight at the end of a rope to the surface
- Skin bend – Decompression symptoms in superficial tissues
- Skindiving (disambiguation)

=== Sl ===
Section contents: Top of section, Sa–Sb, Sc–Sd, Se, Sh, Si–Sj, Sk, Sl, Sm, Sn, So, Sp–Sr, St, Su, Sw, Sy

- Sladen Suit – Early British military drysuit
- Sling (rigging) – Rope, webbing, wire or chain used to support a load for lifting
- Sling cylinder – An independent scuba set carried clipped to the side of a scuba diver's harness
- Slingshot valve – Dual outlet scuba cylinder valve with Y-shape body

=== Sm ===
- Smith, Gordon – Inventor of KISS diving rebreather, born 1950

=== Sn ===
Section contents: Top of section, Sa–Sb, Sc–Sd, Se, Sh, Si–Sj, Sk, Sl, Sm, Sn, So, Sp–Sr, St, Su, Sw, Sy

- Snag-line search – Use of a taut line towed across the search area to catch on the target
- Snell's law, also known as law of refraction – Formula for refraction angles
- Snoopy loop, also known as ranger band – Rubber band made from inner tube
- Snorkel – Tube for breathing face down at the surface of the water
- Snorkel mask – Breathing apparatus for surface swimming
- Snorkeling – Swimming while inhaling through a snorkel
- Snorkeling vest, also known as snorkelling vest – Personal buoyancy aid for use while snorkeling
- Snuba – Limited depth airline breathing apparatus towed by the diver

=== So ===
Section contents: Top of section, Sa–Sb, Sc–Sd, Se, Sh, Si–Sj, Sk, Sl, Sm, Sn, So, Sp–Sr, St, Su, Sw, Sy

- Società Anonima Lavorazioni Vari Appararecchi di Salvataggio (SALVAS) – Italian manufacturer of salvage and diving equipment
- Society for Underwater Historical Research – Amateur maritime archaeology organisation in South Australia
- Solo diver – Recreational diver diving without a dive buddy
- Solo Diver – SDI recreational diver self-sufficiency certification
- Solo diver certification – Original solo scuba diving certification
- Solo diving – Recreational diving without a dive buddy
- Solo diving skills – Additional scuba skills of self-reliance
- Solubility – Capacity of a substance to dissolve in a homogeneous way
- Solution – Homogeneous mixture of a solute and a solvent
- Sonar – Acoustic sensing method
- Sonar imaging – Constructing digital images from sonar data
- Sonic orifice – Orifice undergoing choked flow of a compressible medium
- South African Association for Marine Biological Research (SAAMBR) – Non profit conservation research organisation based in Durban, SA
- South African Department of Employment and Labour – Department of the South African government responsible for matters related to employment
- South African Environmental Observation Network (SAEON) – A network to perform long-term ecological research in South Africa and surrounding waters
- South African Underwater Sports Federation (SAUSF) – Official World Underwater Federation representative body in the Republic of South Africa
- South Pacific Underwater Medicine Society (SPUMS) – Publisher for diving and hyperbaric medicine and physiology
- South Pacific Underwater Medical Society Journal – Journal covering underwater and hyperbaric medicine and physiology
- Southern African Underwater and Hyperbaric Medical Association (SAUHMA)

=== Sp–Sr ===
Section contents: Top of section, Sa–Sb, Sc–Sd, Se, Sh, Si–Sj, Sk, Sl, Sm, Sn, So, Sp–Sr, St, Su, Sw, Sy

- SP-350 Denise – French two-person submarine built in 1959
- Spearfisherman (company) – American diving equipment manufacturer
- Spearfishing – Hunting for fish using a spear
- Speargun – Underwater fishing implement
- Special Actions Detachment – Special operations maritime unit of the Portuguese Navy
- Special Air Service – Special forces of the British Army
- Special Air Service Regiment – Special forces unit of the Australian Army
- Special Boat Service – Special forces unit of the Royal Navy
- Special Duties Unit – Hong Kong Police tactical unit
- Special Forces Command (Turkey) – Turkish special forces group
- Special Forces Group (Belgium) – Special forces unit in the Belgian Armed Forces
- Special Operations Battalion (Croatia) – Special forces military unit
- Special Service Group (Navy) – Special operations force of the Pakistan Navy
- Special Warfare Diving and Salvage – Bangladesh Navy special operations force
- Speleonaut – Diver propulsion vehicle designed for cave exploration by a disabled diver
- Spindle (vehicle) – Ice penetrating two-stage autonomous underwater vehicle
- Spiral box search – Search pattern expanding stepwise outward from datum
- Spitcock – Valve on diving helmet to provide water for the diver to spit on inside of viewport
- Splenic contraction – Contraction of the spleen releasing red blood cells into the circulation
- Sponge diving – Diving to gather natural sponges
- Sport (shipwreck) – Tugboat wrecked in Lake Huron
- Sport diving (sport) – Underwater sport using recreational open circuit scuba equipment in a swimming pool
- SPP-1 underwater pistol – Soviet four-barreled underwater dart pistol
- SPUMS – Publisher for diving and hyperbaric medicine and physiology
- SPURV – Self propelled underwater research vehicle built in 1957 for the US Navy
- SPURV II – Special purpose underwater research vessel built to srudy submarine wakes
- Square profile dive, also known as square dive profile – Dive with constant depth for the full bottom time
- Squeeze (diving) – Barotrauma of descent
- SRV-300 – Deep-submergence rescue vehicle

=== St ===
Section contents: Top of section, Sa–Sb, Sc–Sd, Se, Sh, Si–Sj, Sk, Sl, Sm, Sn, So, Sp–Sr, St, Su, Sw, Sy

- Stabilizer jacket – Configuration of diving buoyancy compensator
- Stage cylinder – Diving cylinder intended to be collected for use on the return part of a scuba dive
- Staged deccompression, also known as stage decompression – Decompression with stops at specific depths
- Stage drop, also known as stage-drop – Placing a scuba cylinder at the distance line for planned later use.
- Stage rigging (scuba) – Clips, cords and straps on a scuba cylinder to attach it to a diver
- Stage set (scuba) – Scuba set to be used during a stage of a dive
- Standard diving dress – Copper helmet with rubberised canvas diving suit and weighted boots
- Standard diving equipment – Copper helmet with rubberised canvas diving suit and weighted boots
- Standard diving helmet – Copper free-flow helmet system used with Standard Diving Dress
- Standard helmet – Helmet of standard diving dress
- Standard operating procedure – Set of detailed instructions to assist in workplace safety
- Standard procedure – A recommend way to do something that is known to be effective and safe
- Standby diver, also known as stand-by diver – Diver who is ready to go to the assistance of the working diver
- Standby diving – Diving as a safety attendant to the working diver
- Standard diving dress – Copper helmet with rubberised canvas diving suit and weighted boots
- Standard operating procedure – Set of detailed instructions to assist in workplace safety
- Star Canopus diving accident – Fatal offshore diving bell accident in 1978
- Static apnea – Stationary diving discipline of holding breath underwater
- Static lung load – Difference in static pressure between ambient pressure and the interior of the lung
- Stena Seaspread diving accident – Saturation diving bell incident with successful rescue in the North Sea in 1981
- Storage depth – Pressure in the accommodation chambers of a saturation system
- Stratification – Layering of a body of water due to density variations
- Stress exposure training – Training in a deliberately distracting environment
- Striver (bathyscaphe), also known as Struggler (bathyscaphe) – Chinese deep submergence vehicle

=== Su ===
Section contents: Top of section, Sa–Sb, Sc–Sd, Se, Sh, Si–Sj, Sk, Sl, Sm, Sn, So, Sp–Sr, St, Su, Sw, Sy

- Sub-Aqua Association (SAA) – British recreational diver training and certification organisation
- Submarine emergency gas supply – Breathing gas system installed in submarine for emergency use
- Submarine Escape Immersion Equipment – Whole-body exposure suit that allows submariners to escape from a sunken submarine
- Submarine escape set – Self contained breathing apparatus providing gas to escape from a submerged submarine
- Submarine escape training facility – Facility used for training submariners in methods of escape from a sunken submarine
- Submarine Escape Training Facility (Australia) – Shore facility of the Royal Australian Navy
- Sub Marine Explorer – Early submarine craft
- Submarine pipeline – Pipeline that is laid on the seabed or below it inside a trench
- Submarine Products – Former British diving equipment manufacturer and distributor.
- Submarine rescue – Rescue of personnel from a disabled submarine
- Submarine rescue chamber – Diving chamber for rescue of personnel of sunk submarines
- Submarine Rescue Diving Recompression System – Remotely operated vehicle for rescue of personnel from sunken submarines
- Submarine rescue ship – Support ship for submarine rescue and deep-sea salvage operations
- Submersible pressure gauge – Pressure measuring instrument for underwater service
- Subskimmer – Submersible diver propulsion vehicle with inflatable buoyancy for surface use
- Subsurface (software) – Open source software for logging and planning scuba dives
- Suit squeeze – Barotrauma caused by the folds of a diving suit piching the skin
- Superoxide scrubber – Breathing gas scrubber that adds oxygen and removes carbon dioxide
- Supersaturation – State of a solution that contains more solute than can be dissolved at equilibrium
- Supervised diver – Minimum requirements for a recreational diver to dive in open water under direct supervision
- Supply lock – Small airlock to transfer supplies between areas of different pressure
- Support diver – Recreational diving equivalent of a stand-by diver
- Surface atmospheric pressure – Atmospheric pressure at a location on Earth's surface
- Surface blackout – Loss of consciuosness immediately following surfacing of a freediver
- Surface breathing of oxygen – Use of high concentration oxygen at atmospheric pressure
- Surface decompression – Decompression in a diving chamber out of the water
- Surface decompression on oxygen – Staged decompression obligation done in a decompression chamber
- Surface interval – The time spent out of the water between dives
- Surface marker buoy – Buoy towed by a scuba diver to indicate position
- Surface oriented diving, also known as Surface-oriented diving – Underwater diving in which the diver starts and finishes at surface pressure
- Surface stand-by diver procedures – Functions of member of a professional diving team
- Surface-supplied air diver – Person competent to dive with surface-supplied breathing apparatus
- Surface-supplied breathing apparatus – Equipment to supply a diver with breathing gas at ambient pressure from the surface
- Surface-supplied diver, also known as surface supplied diver – Underwater diver breathing gas supplied from the surface
- Surface-supplied diving – Underwater diving breathing gas supplied from the surface
- Surface-supplied diving emergency procedure, also known as surface-supplied diving emergency skill – Standard procedures for use in common surface-supplied diving emergencies
- Surface-supplied diving equipment – Equipment used specifically for surface supplied diving
- Surface-supplied diving procedures – Procedures used in the safe operation and use of surface-supplied diving equipment
- Surface-supplied diving skills, also known as surface supplied diving skills – Underwater diving procedures
- Surface-supplied gas management – Provision of breathing gas to surface-supplied divers
- Surface-supplied mixed gas diver – Person competent to dive with mixed gas from a closed bell
- Surface tension – Tendency of a liquid surface to shrink to reduce surface area
- Surface water searches – Procedures to find objects or persons lost at the surface of a body of water
- Surface tension – Tendency of a liquid surface to shrink to reduce surface area
- Surfactant – Substance that lowers the surface tension between a liquid and another material
- Surfer's ear – Common name for an abnormal bone growth within the external ear canal
- Surge (wave action) – The component of wave motion close to and parallel with the bottom
- Sustained load cracking – Metallurgical failure mode of cracking under a prolonged static load
- Suunto – Finnish manufacturer of compasses, dive computers and sports watches

=== Sw ===
Section contents: Top of section, Sa–Sb, Sc–Sd, Se, Sh, Si–Sj, Sk, Sl, Sm, Sn, So, Sp–Sr, St, Su, Sw, Sy

- Swedish Armed Forces Diving and Naval Medicine Centre – Diver education and training; diving medicine research and development
- Swimfin – Footwear used for personal propulsion through water
- Swimming – Self-propulsion of a person through water
- Swimming-induced pulmonary edema – Body fluid in the lungs while swimming.
- Swim-through – Short underwater tunnel with adequate clearance and obvious exit

=== Sy ===
Section contents: Top of section, Sa–Sb, Sc–Sd, Se, Sh, Si–Sj, Sk, Sl, Sm, Sn, So, Sp–Sr, St, Su, Sw, Sy

- Systemic circulation – Portion of the cardiovascular system which transports oxygenated blood away from the heart
- Systems technician – Person competent to maintain diving systems

Contents: Top	0–9	A	B	C	D	E	F	G	H	I	J	K	L	M	N	O	P	Q	R	S	T	U	V	W	X	Y	Z

== See also ==
- Outline of underwater diving – List of articles related to underwater diving grouped by topical relevance
- Glossary of underwater diving terminology
- List of diving equipment manufacturers
