= Manifold (fluid mechanics) =

Structure that splits or combines fluid flow into channels

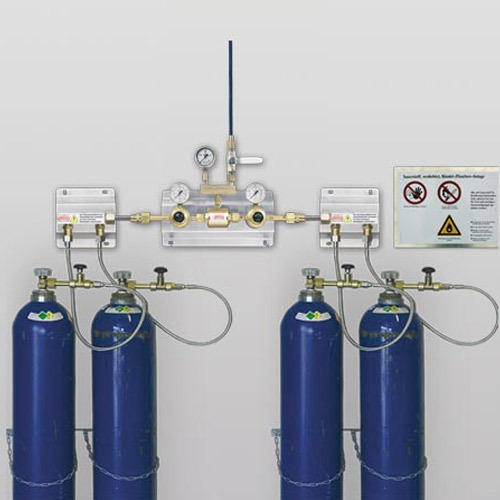
Gas manifold

A manifold is a wider and/or larger pipe or channel, into which smaller pipes or channels lead, or a pipe fitting or similar device that connects multiple inputs or outputs for fluids.

== Manifolds ==
=== Engineering ===
Types of manifolds in engineering include:

Exhaust manifold
An engine part that collects the exhaust gases from multiple cylinders into one pipe. Also known as headers.
Hydraulic manifold
A component used to regulate fluid flow in a hydraulic system, thus controlling the transfer of power between actuators and pumps
Inlet manifold (or "intake manifold")
An engine part that supplies the air or fuel/air mixture to the cylinders
Scuba manifold
In a scuba set, connects two or more diving cylinders
Vacuum gas manifold
An apparatus used in chemistry to manipulate gases

Also, many dredge pipe pieces.

=== Biology ===
In biology manifolds are found in:

- Cardiovascular system (blood vessel manifolds, etc.)
- Lymphatic system
- Respiratory system

=== Other fields ===
Manifolds are used in:

- HVAC
- Pipe organ
- Plumbing
