= Snuba =

Limited depth airline breathing apparatus towed by the diver

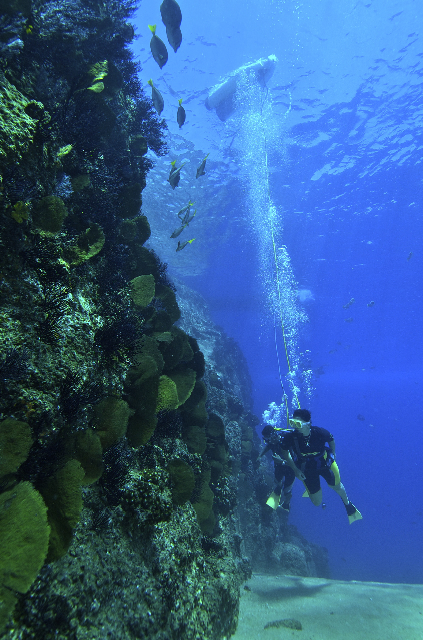
- Breathing air is supplied through hoses connected to compressed air cylinders on a raft at the surface.
- Other names: Hookah; Airline diving
- Uses: Surface supplied air system for shallow recreational diving
- Manufacturer: Snuba International Inc

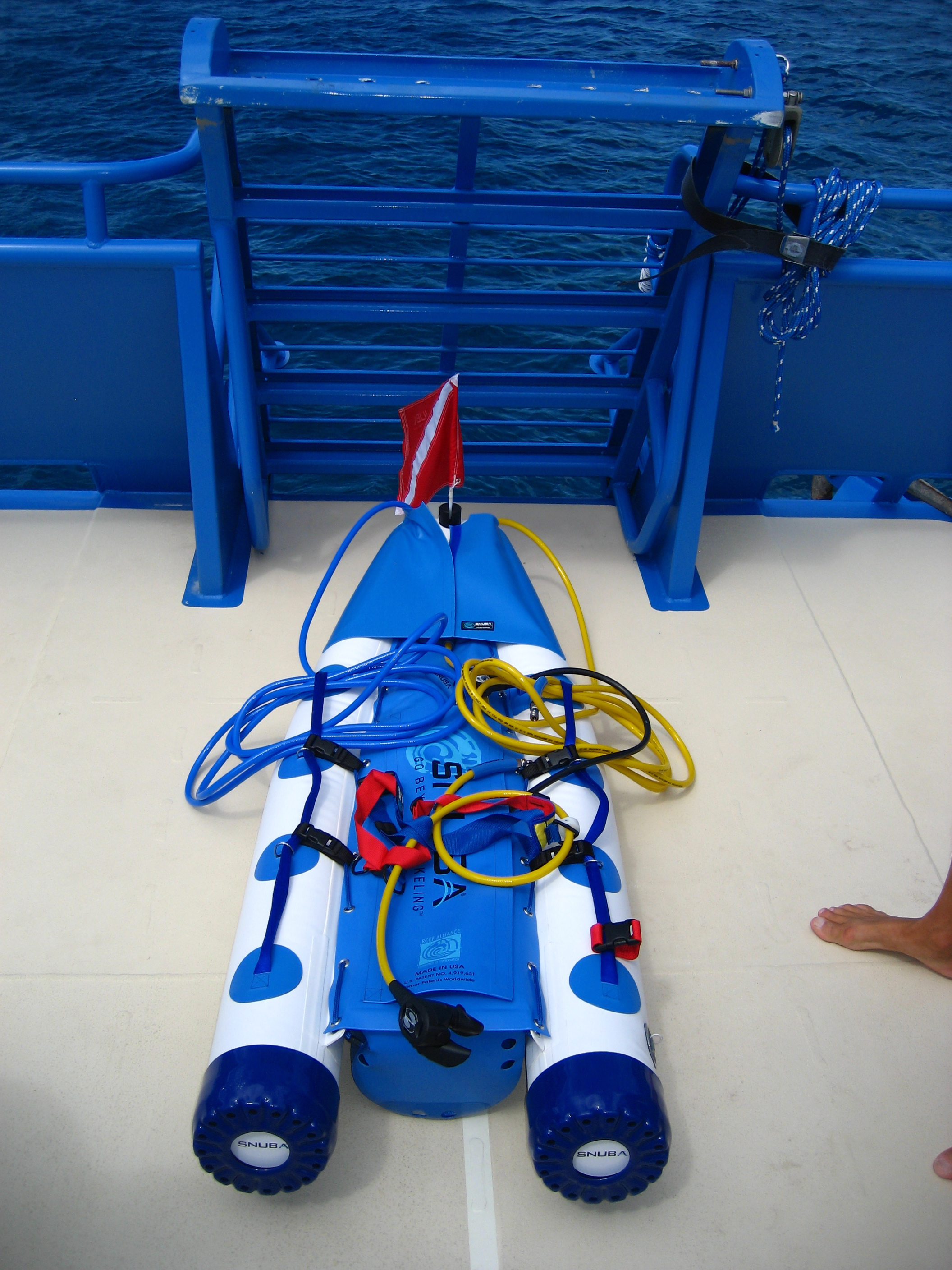
A raft used for snuba showing the air cylinder and hoses

Snuba is form of surface-supplied diving that uses an underwater breathing system developed by Snuba International. The origin of the word "Snuba" may be a portmanteau of "snorkel" and "scuba", as it bridges the gap between the two. Alternatively, some have identified the term as an acronym for "Surface Nexus Underwater Breathing Apparatus", though this may be a backronym for the portmanteau. The swimmer uses swimfins, a diving mask, weights, and diving regulator as in scuba diving. Instead of coming from tanks strapped to the diver's back, air is supplied from long hoses connected to compressed air cylinders contained in a specially designed flotation device at the surface. Snuba often serves as a form of introductory diving, in the presence of a professionally trained guide, but does not require scuba certification.

== Popularity ==
The snuba system was devised in 1989 by California diver Michael Stafford. It was developed and patented in 1990 by Snuba International, based in Diamond Springs, California, who own the trademark and licensed it as a touring program. Snuba diving is a popular guided touring activity in tropical tourist locations such as Hawaii, Thailand, the Caribbean, and Mexico.

Snuba is also popular because no certification or prior diving experience is required. Participants only need to be at least 8 years of age, have basic swimming ability, have no known medical disqualification, and be comfortable in the water. Its popularity as a first timer's experience can be attributed to several factors:

- The participant tows the raft on the surface via a lightweight harness connected to an air line. This gives the participant the secure knowledge that they cannot descend too deep and allows them to choose the depth that they feel most comfortable while being able to control their depth, descent, and ascent rates. By utilizing the hose as a guide, combined with wearing soft weights to achieve neutral buoyancy, participants are able to descend anywhere from just under the surface to 6 metres (20 ft) deep.
- The user is able to hold on to the raft at the surface by a rope that runs the length of the raft on both sides. This also allows the user to hold on to the raft while becoming comfortable breathing before beginning to descend. Being connected to the raft also provides users with a feeling of safety, comfort, and gives them the option to hold on to the raft when they return to the surface.
- Compared to scuba, snuba divers wear minimal gear. Each diver is equipped with a mask, fins, weight belt, harness, and regulator. The harness holds the regulator and the air line in place, allowing the diver to swim relatively unencumbered beneath the surface. Full scuba gear, which includes a buoyancy compensator, weights, and cylinder, can weigh in excess of 27 kilograms (60 lb), but this is not strictly comparable, as it would usually include a wetsuit for thermal protection.
- Although scuba equipment is nearly weightless underwater, out of the water the weight becomes a significant factor for weak or unfit individuals. Unlike a scuba diver using a buoyancy compensator, the snuba diver is not provided with an emergency buoyancy system. This means that in an emergency, the snuba diver must reach the surface unaided. On the other hand, a correctly weighted snuba diver, with no compressible dive suit will be neutrally buoyant at all depths, has a hose and harness to prevent sinking, can pull on the hose to surface which is less effort than swimming, and has a raft with a grab-rope to hold on to at the surface. The buoyancy compensator is a complex piece of equipment requiring significant skill to use safely.

== Disadvantages ==
In a strong current, wave action, or breeze, the combination of underwater hose and surface raft can pull quite hard on a diver. Therefore, snuba is best used in areas where wind, waves, and current are negligible. Since all snuba use is provided through licensed snuba operators, the possibility of being subjected to strong current, high waves, or high wind is low. However, it is beneficial if an employee of the snuba operator remains on the surface to monitor conditions.

== Risk and liability ==
Since the depth of a snuba dive is limited by the length of the hose to about 6 metres (20 ft), decompression sickness is unlikely to be a problem. However, as the snuba diver is breathing compressed air there is still a risk of injury or death due to barotrauma, which is a more severe hazard at shallow depths if divers ascend as little as a few feet without venting the expanding air from their lungs. This is easily avoided by breathing normally and continuously while ascending, provided that the diver is medically fit to dive. This point is thoroughly covered in snuba pre-dive briefings, and monitored by the dive guide throughout the dive by watching for the continual release of bubbles from each diver.. It is not clear how such monitoring is intended to help, unless the dive guide is within immediate reach of the diver. The risk of pulmonary barotrauma is greatest during an emergency ascent, if the diver uses up all the air or loses their grip on the mouthpiece, panics, and ascends while holding their breath. This is one of the more common causes of fatalities in inexperienced scuba divers, even when trained and certified. The equipment does not provide the diver with any means of monitoring the amount of gas remaining in the cylinder.

According to the snuba website, since starting operation in 1989, more than 5 million dives were conducted without injury or fatality, Nonetheless, there has been at least one fatality to a snuba diver and it occurred in April of 2014. The cause of death was not reported so it is unknown if the death was related specifically to the use of snuba or other causes. There is a snuba liability release form that releases the operators and developers of the snuba system from any liability or responsibility for damage, injury, or death due to neglect, system failure, or any other reason. It requires the diver to assert that they are not aware of any medical reason why they should not dive, or have been cleared to dive by a physician.
