= Dredge pipe pieces =

Dredge pipe pieces are a variety of pipes on board of dredgers like bend pipe, T-pipe, pitched T-pipe, Y-pipe, cross pipe, strait pipe, and conical pipe.

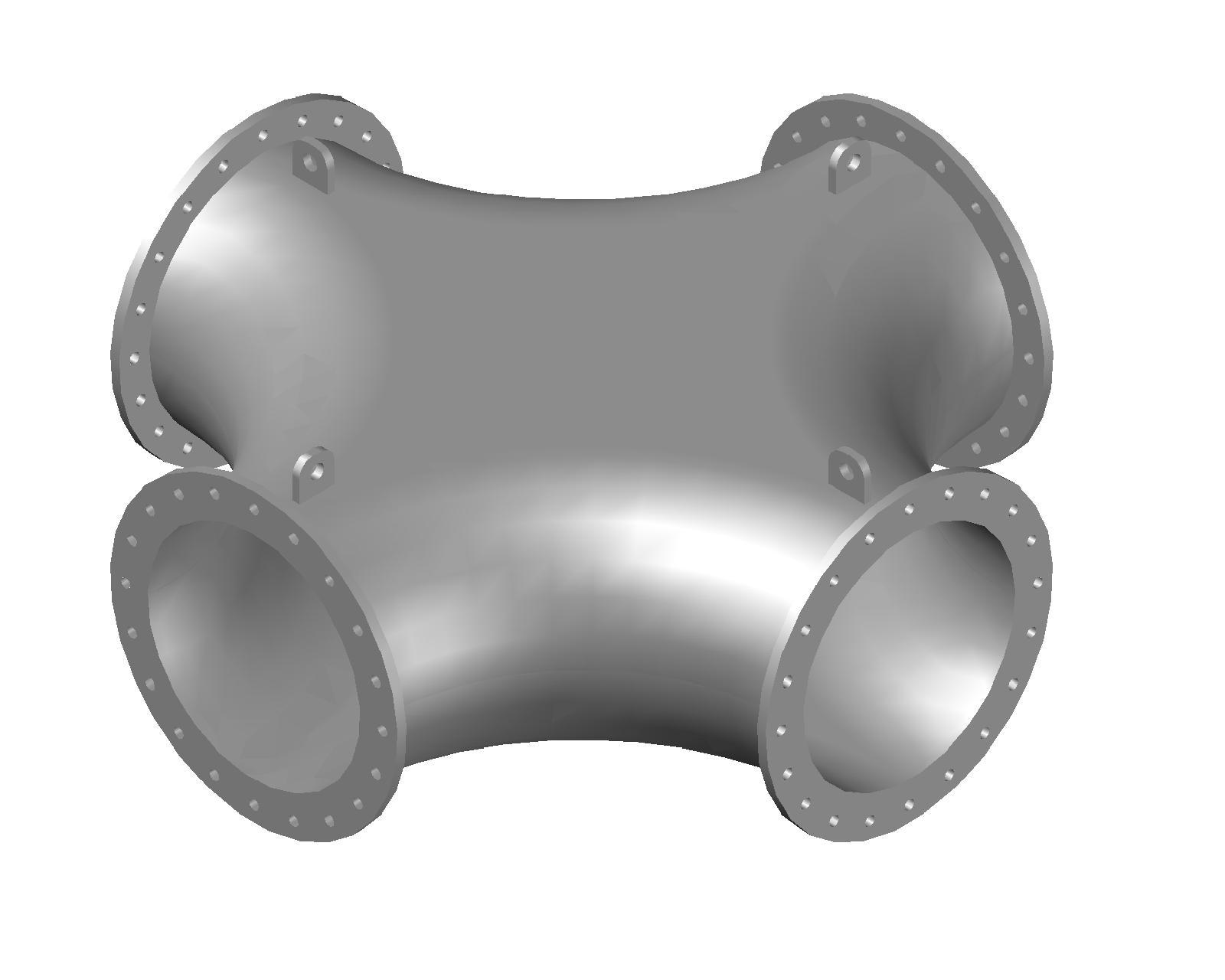
CAD design of dredge cross pipe piece

These dredge pipe pieces are used onboard of dredgers to connect the dredge pump with the discharge pipe.

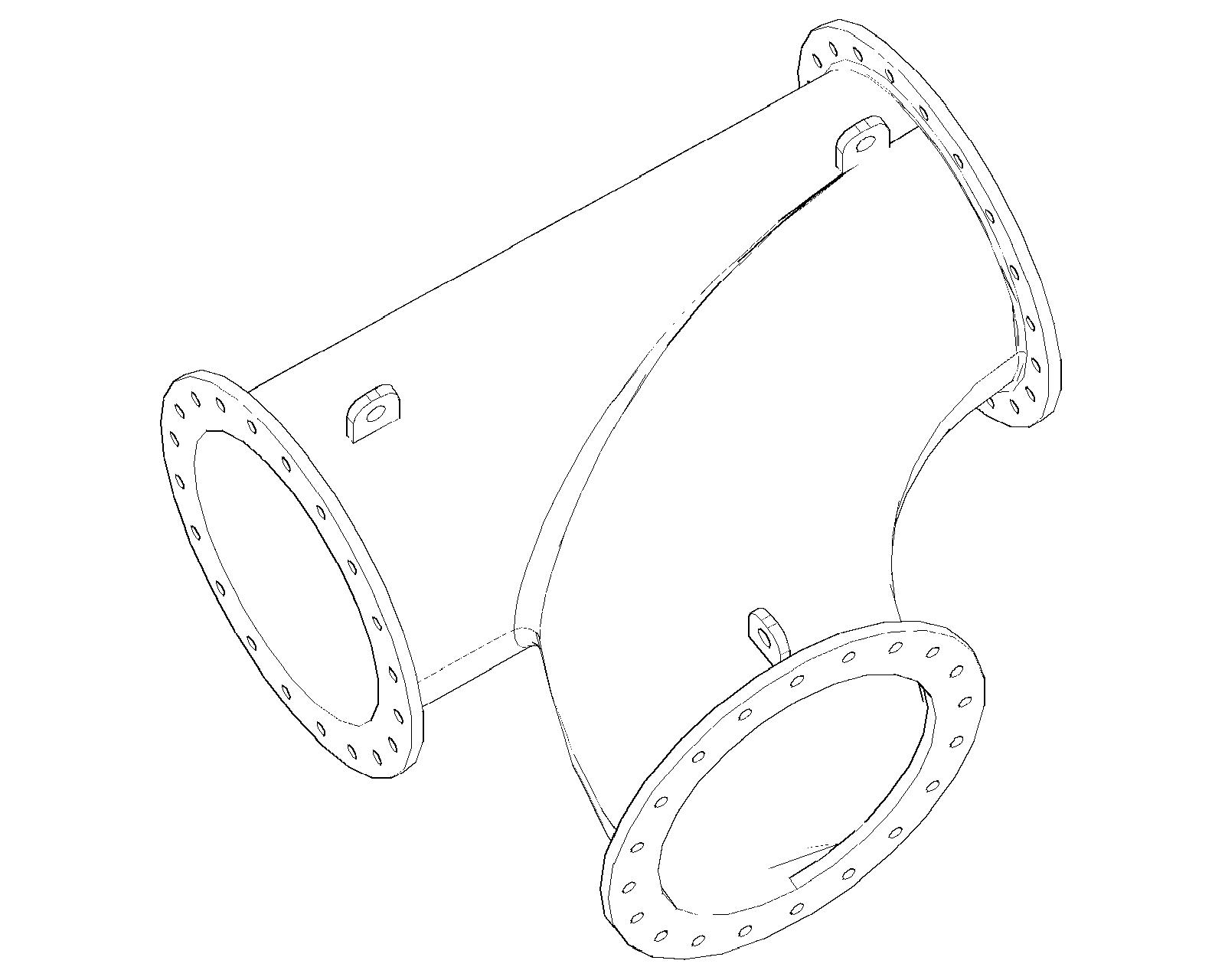
Dredge pitched T-pipe

Mostly the pipes are made from cast steel. Sometime welded pipes are used.

Dredge pipe pieces may have different thicknesses, shapes, and lengths, they are also provided with lifting lugs for easy handling. They are supposed to have a smooth surface for low friction. In most cases the flanges are cast together with the pipe to provide a stronger connection between the flange and the pipe.

It is also very important that the entire dredge pipe pieces follow the shape of the flow resulting in low frictions and avoiding vortexes.
The materials used to manufacture the dredge pipe pieces are both manganese the alloy that provides high elongation and impacts value or high chromium, nickel and molybdenum an alloy that gives a high yield, high tensile, and very high hardness values.
