= Silt out =

Reduction of underwater visibility by disturbing silt deposits

A silt out or silt-out is a situation when underwater visibility is rapidly reduced to functional zero by disturbing fine particulate deposits on the bottom or other solid surfaces. This can happen in scuba and surface supplied diving, or in ROV and submersible operations, and is a more serious hazard for scuba diving in penetration situations where the route to the surface may be obscured.

== Causes ==
The most common cause in scuba diving is when a divers' fins are used too forcefully or in the wrong direction; disturbing silt, particularly in caves, wrecks or in still fresh water environments. Specific non-silting underwater propulsion techniques are taught as standard on cave diving and technical-level wreck diving penetration courses; such as the Frog Kick, Modified Flutter Kick, Helicopter Turn, Pull-and-Glide, Finger Walking and the Back / Reverse Kick.

Another common cause when wreck diving is from exhaled bubbles from open circuit scuba disturbing overhead surfaces and making loose rust particles sink down from above. The inside of wrecks or caves are often covered in a fine sediment which might get stirred up accidentally by the diver's motions, causing a silt out.

Surface supplied divers have the additional problem of the umbilical trailing behind them, which is also likely to disturb silt where it makes contact, and the underwater work may also disturb silt. For these reasons surface supplied divers must often operate in very poor visibility.

Remotely operated underwater vehicles and submersibles manoeuver by using thrusters, and the water blast from thrusters has a similar effect to the wash from fins.

== Consequences ==
Silt outs are dangerous situations for scuba divers, particularly in enclosed spaces or when there is no direct access to the surface (an overhead environment). Training courses in overhead environment diving, such as wreck or cave diving teaches various methods to cope with zero visibility. Always using guidelines during penetration dives is an important safety measure as it helps divers find their way out.

Surface supplied divers are generally at less risk from silt out as they are connected to the surface by an umbilical and can not get lost, but they may become disorientated, and unable to work effectively. It is also more likely for them to have an umbilical snag in bad visibility, and if assistance is required from the stand-by diver, this is more difficult in a silt out.

A severe silt out will make the video cameras on a ROV ineffective, though many also have sonar, which will continue to work through silted water, but this generally makes operation more difficult for the pilot, and the mission objectives may become impossible.

== Avoidance and mitigation ==
=== Training ===
Scuba training for silted out situations includes exercises in following and finding (lost) lines, or searching for missing team members with a blackout mask. Likewise, all core diving skills, including equipment function, controlled ascent, air-sharing and other emergency protocols must be practiced until they can be performed without visual reference.

Initial 'zero viz' training may be performed by visual, then blindfolded, walking drills on land, followed later by open water rehearsal with a blackout mask. At higher training levels, the drills are also rehearsed in dark and/or silted overhead environments.

During underwater skill training, instructors simulate various situations in order to train the diver to be able to handle them. Such situations may be regulator free-flowing, out-of-air divers/air-sharing, becoming entangled in the guideline, and the identification and retrieval of deco/stage cylinders without visual reference.

The potential loss of visibility in a given area is regarded as a differentiating factor between recreational and technical level overhead environment dives. If loss of visibility through 'silt-out' is likely, then the dive parameters are generally considered to be technical diving in nature. If so, the diver (or potential overhead environment student) concerned is often expected to possess the skills and protocols necessary to fully function without reliance on vision. This typically means technical dive training, to ensure that the diver has a high degree of comfort and familiarity utilizing multiple cylinders and extensive equipment. Training beyond entry-level technical diving courses is a prerequisite for Cave or Advanced/Technical Wreck diving courses for most scuba diving agencies.

Advanced level cave and technical wreck divers are also taught to squeeze and manipulate a team members' hand for communication, for when a silt-out prevents visual communication via conventional scuba hand or torch signals.

=== Technology ===
Remotely operated underwater vehicles may be fitted with active scanning sonar equipment which can form a screen picture of the local environment in the absence of light and visibility, enabling the operator to see a synthetic view in which colour and some resolution are lost. Hand held units are also available to perform a similar function for the diver, but they are expensive and bulky, and the visibility must still be good enough for the diver to see the screen.
