= SPURV II =

Special purpose underwater research vessel built to srudy submarine wakes

SPURV II, short for Special Purpose Underwater Research Vehicle, was an Autonomous Underwater Vehicle built at the Ocean Physics Department at the Applied Physics Laboratory at the University of Washington in 1973 to study SSBN wakes.

== Capability ==
SPURV II had variable speed, and could run for about 6 hours to depths of 1500 meters. It carried instruments to measure temperature and velocity with taken at 1 kHz, temperature and conductivity taken at 100 Hz, and temperature conductivity, pressure, and dye concentration at 10 Hz.

SPURV II was quite a bit different in its 1975 operational state than its final 1979 state. The instrumentation and the internal recording system capacity were significantly increased, and all of the sensors—temperature and velocity at 1 kHz, temperature, conductivity and velocity at 100 Hz, and (more precisely) temperature, conductivity, dye concentration, and pressure (depth) at 10 Hz—could be recorded for up to 6 hours.

== Operations ==
SPURV II was used to measure submarine wakes at the St. Croix tracking range in the "Coral Trail" experiment (1975) and again in "Hydro" (1979).

It was used until the 1980s.

The 10 Hz temperature and conductivity sensors were located at 1/3, 2/3, and 1 meter vertically, to accurately measure spatial and temporal correlations of temperature, conductivity, and velocity that were found in the wake (dyed) versus not in the wake (no dye).

== See also ==
- Autonomous Underwater Vehicle
- SPURV
