= SPURV =

Self propelled underwater research vehicle built in 1957 for the US Navy

SPURV, or Self-Propelled Underwater Research Vehicle, was an Autonomous Underwater Vehicle built in 1957 at the University of Washington's Applied Physics Laboratory. The research and development of this vehicle was funded by the United States Office of Naval Research (ONR), and it became the US Navy’s first autonomous underwater vehicle (AUV). The navy used a total of 7 SPURV vehicles until 1979.

== Construction ==
The original engineers of SPURV were Bob Van Wagennen (mechanical) and Wayne Nodland (electrical). Terry Ewart calculated the hydrodynamics design on a Berkeley EASE analog computer. SPURV was machined by Boeing from a forging of 7078-T6 aluminum.

== Capability ==
SPURV had an operating depth of at least 3000 meters and a maximum depth of 3600 meters. It could go about 4-5 knots for about 4 hours. A propulsion battery consisting of 2 sets of 16 silver zinc cells connected in a parallel through diodes was the primary power source for SPURV. The battery provided a 24-volt, 200 ampere-hour supply. Secondary power came from 4 solid-state converters.

Acoustic signals from the accompanying research vessel guided SPURV in moving below the surface of the water. SPURV then generated models of underwater physical properties such as ocean currents and temperature.

== Operations ==
SPURV was first operated from the ATA-195, the Navy Seagoing Tug Tatnuck in a 1957 cruise to Cobb Seamount. A tracking system had been built for the Tatnuck by Stan Murphy and Terry Ewart that could plot the range to SPURV on a strip chart recorder and the x-y position on a chart plotter.

The later SPURVS were utilized on 1-2 cruises per year by Terry Ewart and the Applied Physics Lab's Ocean Physics Department Engineers and Research Scientists, conducting about 20 month-long cruises in total to study small scale ocean variability including internal wave and fine-structure data, point source release dye diffusion at 1000 meters, and oceanographic data for acoustic transmission experiments.

In a few operations, two SPURVs were run at once in lock-step, 1 above the other or one beside the other at constant spacings. This was to study spatial coherences of the small scale ocean structure. Most of the SPURVs operated with a vertical rake of temperature and conductivity sensors using what later became the Seabird sensors. In all cases, they could be tracked from the ship—usually with the capability of using a bottom or other reference system, and pitch, roll, and heading corrections for the ship.

The last operation of SPURV was in 1979 in the submarine wake study experiment. APL still has all 5 hulls, but they have not been used since then.

== See also ==
- Autonomous Underwater Vehicle
- SPURV II
