= Skindiving =

Skindiving may refer to:

- Freediving, or breath-hold underwater diving
- Scuba diving, as distinct from the use of standard diving dress (old usage dating from before drysuits and wetsuits were commonly available)
- "Skindiving", a song by rock band James, from the album Laid
