= Scuba diving fatalities =

Deaths occurring while scuba diving or as a consequence of scuba diving

Scuba diving fatalities are deaths occurring while scuba diving or as a consequence of scuba diving. The risks of dying during recreational, scientific or commercial diving are small, and on scuba, deaths are usually associated with poor gas management, poor buoyancy control, equipment misuse, entrapment, rough water conditions, scuba depth record attempts, and pre-existing health problems. Some fatalities are inevitable and caused by unforeseeable situations escalating out of control, though the majority of diving fatalities can be attributed to human error on the part of the victim.

Equipment failure is rare in open circuit scuba, and while the cause of death is commonly recorded as drowning, this is mainly the consequence of an uncontrollable series of events taking place in water. Arterial gas embolism is also frequently cited as a cause of death, and it, too, is the consequence of other factors leading to an uncontrolled and badly managed ascent, possibly aggravated by medical conditions. About a quarter of diving fatalities are associated with cardiac events, mostly in older divers. There is a fairly large body of data on diving fatalities, but in many cases, the data is poor due to the standard of investigation and reporting. This hinders research that could improve diver safety.

For diving facilities, scuba diving fatalities have a major financial impact by way of lost income, lost business, insurance premium increases and high litigation costs.

== Statistics ==
Diving fatality data published in Diving Medicine for Scuba Divers (2015)

- 90% died with their weight belt on.
- 86% were alone when they died (either diving solo or separated from their buddy).
- 80% were men.
- 50% did not inflate their buoyancy compensator.
- 25% first got into difficulty on the surface.
- 50% died on the surface.
- 10% were under training when they died.
- 10% had been advised that they were medically unfit to dive.
- 5% were cave diving.
- 1% of divers attempting a rescue died as a result.

Fatality rates of 16.4 deaths per 100,000 persons per year among DAN America members and 14.4 deaths per 100,000 persons per year the British Sub-Aqua Club (BSAC) members were similar and did not change during 2000–2006. This is comparable with jogging (13 deaths per 100,000 persons per year) and motor vehicle accidents (16 deaths per 100,000 persons per year), and within the range where reduction is desirable by Health and Safety Executive (HSE) criteria.

Activity-based statistics would be a more accurate measurement of risk. Noted above are statistics showing diving fatalities comparable to motor vehicle accidents of 16.4 per 100,000 divers and 16 per 100,000 drivers. DAN 2014/12/17 data shows there are 3.174 million divers in America. Their data shows that 2.351 million dive 1 to 7 times per year. 823,000 dive 8 or more times per year. It is reasonable to say that the average would be in the neighbourhood of 5 dives per year.

Data for 17 million student-diver certifications during 63 million student dives over a 20-year period from 1989-2008 show a mean per capita death rate of 1.7 deaths per 100,000 student divers per year. This was lower than for insured DAN members during 2000–2006 at 16.4 deaths per 100,000 DAN members per year, but fatality rate per dive is a better measure of exposure risk, A mean annual fatality rate of 0.48 deaths per 100,000 student dives per year and 0.54 deaths per 100,000 BSAC dives per year and 1.03 deaths per 100,000 non-BSAC dives per year during 2007. The total size of the diving population is important for determining overall fatality rates, and the population estimates from the 1990s of several million U.S. divers need to be updated.

During 2006 to 2015 there were an estimated 306 million recreational dives made by US residents and 563 recreational diving deaths from this population. The fatality rate was 1.8 per million recreational dives, and 47 deaths for every 1000 emergency department presentations for scuba injuries.

The most frequent known root cause for diving fatalities is running out of, or low on, breathing gas, but the reasons for this are not specified, probably due to lack of data. Other factors cited include buoyancy control, entanglement or entrapment, rough water, equipment misuse or problems and emergency ascent. The most common injuries and causes of death were drowning or asphyxia due to inhalation of water, air embolism and cardiac events. Risk of cardiac arrest is greater for older divers, and greater for men than women, although the risks are equal by age 65.

Several plausible opinions have been put forward but have not yet been empirically validated. Suggested contributing factors included inexperience, infrequent diving, inadequate supervision, insufficient predive briefings, buddy separation and dive conditions beyond the diver's training, experience or physical capacity.

=== Annual fatalities ===
- DAN was notified of 561 recreational scuba deaths during 2010 to 2013. 334 were actively investigated by DAN
- DAN was notified of 146 recreational scuba deaths during 2014. 68 were actively investigated by DAN
- DAN was notified of 127 recreational scuba deaths during 2015. 67 were actively investigated by DAN
- DAN was notified of 169 recreational scuba deaths during 2016. 94 were actively investigated by DAN
- DAN was notified of 228 recreational scuba deaths during 2017. 70 were actively investigated by DAN
- DAN was notified of 189 recreational scuba deaths during 2018.

== Cause of death ==
According to death certificates, over 80% of the deaths were ultimately attributed to drowning, but other factors usually combined to incapacitate the diver in a sequence of events culminating in drowning, which is more a consequence of the medium in which the accidents occurred than the actual accident. Often the drowning obscures the real cause of death. Scuba divers should not drown unless there are other contributory factors as they carry a supply of breathing gas and equipment designed to provide the gas on demand. Drowning occurs as a consequence of preceding problems, such as cardiac disease, pulmonary barotrauma, unmanageable stress, unconsciousness from any cause, water aspiration, trauma, equipment difficulties, environmental hazards, inappropriate response to an emergency or failure to manage the gas supply.

The data gathered in relation to the actual causes of death is changing. Although drowning and arterial gas embolisms are cited in the top three causes of diver deaths, stating these as solitary causes does not recognise any pre-existing health issues. Researchers may know the actual causes of death, but the sequence of events that led to the cause of death is often not clear, especially when local officials or pathologists make assumptions.

In many diving destinations, resources are not available for comprehensive investigations or complete autopsies, The 2010 DAN Diving Fatalities workshop noted that listing drowning as a cause of death is ineffective in determining what actually occurred in an incident, and that lack of information is the primary reason for personal injury lawsuits filed in the industry.

A DAN study published in 2008 investigated 947 recreational open-circuit scuba diving deaths from 1992–2003, and where sufficient information was available, classified the incidents in terms of a sequence of trigger, disabling agent, disabling injury and cause of death. Insufficient gas was the most frequent trigger, at 41%, followed by entrapment at 20%, and equipment problems at 15%. The most common identifiable disabling agents were emergency ascents, at 55%, followed by insufficient gas at 27% and buoyancy complications at 13%. The most frequent disabling injuries were asphyxia at 33%, arterial gas embolism at 29% and cardiac incidents at 26%. Cause of death was reported as drowning in 70% of the cases, arterial gas embolism in 14% and cardiac arrest in 13%. The investigator concluded that disabling injuries were more relevant than cause of death, as drowning often occurred as a consequence of a disabling injury. A further analysis linked risk of type of disabling injury with trigger events. Asphyxia followed entrapment (40%), insufficient gas (32%), buoyancy problems (17%), equipment problems (15%), rough water (11%). Arterial gas embolism was associated with emergency ascent (96%), insufficient gas (63%), equipment trouble (17%), entrapment (9%). Cardiac incidents were associated with cardiovascular disease and age over 40 years. Their conclusion was that the most effective way to reduce diving deaths would be by minimising the frequency of adverse events.

== Manner of death ==
If the manner of death is deemed to be accidental (or due to misadventure, where this is applicable), which is usually the case, the incident leading to death is seldom analysed sufficiently to be useful in determining the probable sequence of events, particularly the triggering event, and therefore is not usually useful for improving diver safety.

The chain of events leading to diving fatalities is varied in detail, but there are common elements: a triggering event, which leads to a disabling or harmful event and causes a disabling injury, which may itself be fatal or lead to drowning. One or more of the four events may not be unidentifiable.

Death usually followed a sequence or combination of events, most of which may have been survivable in isolation. In the more than 940 fatality statistics studied by DAN over ten years, only one-third of the triggers could be identified. The most common of these were:

1. Insufficient gas (41%)
2. Entrapment (20%)
3. Equipment problems (15%)

Disabling agents were also identified in one-third of the cases. The most common identified were:

1. Emergency ascent (55%)
2. Insufficient gas (27%)
3. Buoyancy trouble (13%)
4. Excessive work of breathing (mostly associated with very deep dives)

=== Disabling injuries ===
Disabling injuries were identified in nearly two-thirds of the cases. The criteria for identify the disabling injury by forensic judgement are specified.

1. Asphyxia (33%), with or without aspiration of water, and no evidence of a previous disabling injury.
  - Triggering events associated with asphyxia included:
    - (40%) entrapment due to entanglement in kelp, wreckage, mooring lines, fishing lines or nets, and entrapment in confined spaces or under ice
    - (32%) insufficient gas, when it was the first identifiable problem, but generally the reason for lack of gas was not determined.
    - (15%) problems with equipment included regulator free-flow, unexpectedly high gas consumption, and diver error in the use of the scuba apparatus, buoyancy compensator, weighting system or dry suit.
    - (11%) rough water conditions included high sea states, strong currents, and surf conditions at beaches, rocky shores and piers.
  - Disabling agents associated with asphyxia cases included:
    - (62%) insufficient gas, triggered by entrapment, equipment problems, or high gas consumption due to heavy exercise in rough conditions.
    - (17%) buoyancy problems, triggered by over- or under-weighting, lack of inflation gas for the buoyancy compensator, or over-inflation of the buoyancy compensator or dry suit.
    - (13%) emergency ascent, triggered by entrapment or lack of breathing gas, was associated with both asphyxia and lung overpressure injury.
  - Other contributing factors were not as clearly connected: Panic was reported in about a fifth of the cases, and may have caused aspiration or accelerated gas consumption. Casualties were diving alone or were separated from their buddies in about 40% of cases with asphyxia, but this was also associated with other disabling injuries.
2. Arterial gas embolism (29%), with gas detected in cerebral arteries, evidence of lung rupture, and history of an emergency ascent.
  - Triggers associated with AGE included:
    - (63%) insufficient gas,
    - (17%) equipment problems,
    - (9%) entanglement or entrapment
  - AGE deaths were often associated with panic.
  - Disabling agents associated with AGE cases included:
    - (96%) emergency ascent. Loss of consciousness was typical, followed by drowning for divers who remained in the water after surfacing.
3. Cardiac incidents (26%), where chest discomfort was indicated by the diver, distress displayed with no obvious cause, a history of cardiac disease and autopsy evidence.
  - There were few overt triggers or disabling agents identified, but reports suggested that about 60% of the decedents displayed symptoms of dyspnea, fatigue, chest pain or other distress, and 10% displayed these symptoms before the dive.
  - Problems were noticed before entering the water in 24% of these cases, at the bottom in 46% of cases, and after starting the ascent in 20% of cases
  - Loss of consciousness could occur at any time.
  - Autopsy reports usually showed evidence of significant cardiovascular disease but seldom myocardial damage, which suggests that fatal dysrhythmias or drowning may have occurred before heart muscle injury could develop.
  - Disabling cardiac incidents were associated with cardiovascular disease and age greater than 40 years, but no significant association with body mass index.
4. Trauma (5%), where a traumatic incident was witnessed or determined by autopsy. The cause of injury is usually obvious, and included incidents of being struck by a watercraft, tumbled over a rocky shoreline by surf, electric shock, and interactions with marine animals. Some could possibly have been avoided by the diver. Traumatic injuries were most commonly associated with rough water conditions and being a frequent diver.
5. Decompression sickness (3.5%), based on symptoms, signs and autopsy findings. Triggers for DCS included:
  - insufficient gas, followed by emergency ascent with omitted decompression.
  - multiple repetitive dives with short surface intervals.
  - gas lost in a regulator free-flow
  - uncontrolled ascent due to dry suit inflator malfunction
  - dragged deep by a speared fish
  - DCS was associated with deep diving, diving alone, and emergency ascent with omitted decompression
6. Unexplained loss of consciousness (2.5%), where the diver was discovered unconscious without obvious cause.
  - Triggers may have included deep dives, diabetes and nitrox dives, including a seizure witnessed at a depth where the oxygen partial pressure would have been approximately 1 bar, normally considered safe.
  - Loss of consciousness was associated with diabetes, frequent diving, and learner divers.
7. Inappropriate gas (2%), Breathing gas supply contaminated by toxic levels of carbon monoxide, or selection of gas with excessive or insufficient oxygen content for the depth.
  - CNS oxygen toxicity, in some cases associated with medications.
  - Carbon monoxide poisoning from contaminated cylinder gas
  - Hypoxia, from incorrect gas choice and from oxygen content depleted by corrosion in the cylinder

=== Association and causality ===
The traditional procedure for developing diving safety recommendations is based on the assumption that associations of circumstances with fatalities are causative. This is reasonable in cases where the cause both precedes the effect and is logically clearly connected, such as where entanglement precedes asphyxia, but in many cases indirect associations are not clearly causative and require further verification. This may not be possible when there is insufficient data. Confident causal inference requires consistent associations that do not conflict with logical medical and engineering reasoning.

Analysis of case information for diving fatalities has identified a wide variety of triggers and disabling agents, but has also shown that most fatalities are associated with a small group of these triggers and disabling agents, which suggests that a large reduction in fatalities could be achieved by concentrating on remedying these key factors. Many of these could be improved by training and practice, some by a change of attitude, but some diving fatalities appear to be unavoidable as the risk is inherent in the activity and depends on factors that are not under the control of the diver.

The most frequent trigger appears to be insufficient breathing gas. This can obviously be avoided by paying more attention to gas management and having a reliable emergency gas supply available. The next most frequent trigger, entanglement, can largely be avoided by keeping clear of obvious entanglement hazards, and can be mitigated by extrication skills, tools and an adequate gas supply while busy. A competent buddy is clearly of great value in cases where the diver cannot see or reach the snag point. The third ranking trigger was equipment failure, but the variety of failures possible is large, and diving equipment in good condition is generally very reliable. No particular item appears to be obviously less reliable. Good maintenance, testing of function before use, carrying redundant critical equipment and skill at correcting the more critical malfunctions are fairly obvious remedies.

The most frequent disabling agent in response to a trigger appears to be emergency ascent. Clearly, avoiding the trigger would eliminate the disabling agent, and this should be the top priority, but the ability to cope effectively with an emergency that does occur would break the sequence of uncontrolled and harmful events, and probably avoid a fatality. A fully independent alternative breathing gas source or a fully competent and reliable buddy are the obvious solutions, as more than half of the victims were on their own preceding death.

Inappropriate buoyancy was the most frequently identified adverse event, with negative buoyancy more common than positive buoyancy. On some occasions the buoyancy problem was sudden and control was lost quickly, but on many occasions there was a longer term effect of non-catastrophic but chronic over-weighting which led to overexertion and rapid gas consumption, leaving the diver less capable of coping with the stress of the next problem to occur. Buoyancy issues could be a more important contributing factor than is immediately apparent.

== Contributory factors ==
The "DAN Annual Diving Report 2016 edition" lists their Ten Most Wanted Improvements in Scuba as:

- Correct weighting
- Greater buoyancy control
- More attention to gas planning
- Better ascent rate control
- Increased use of checklists
- Fewer equalizing injuries
- Improved cardiovascular health in divers
- Diving more often (or more pre-trip refresher training)
- Greater attention to diving within limits
- Fewer equipment issues / improved maintenance

=== Diving techniques, competence, and experience ===
More than half of diving fatalities may be a consequence of violations of accepted good practice. Divers who died for reasons other than a medical cause were found to be about 7 times more likely to have one or more violations of recommended practice associated with the fatality.

The DAN fatalities workshop of 2011 found that there is a real problem that divers do not follow the procedures they have been trained in, and dive significantly beyond their training, experience, and fitness levels, and that this was the basic cause of most accidents. In litigation involving diving accidents, the legal panel reported that 85% to 90% of the cases were attributable to diver error. This is consistent with several scientific studies. Medical issues are a significant part of the problem, and certified divers are responsible for assessing their own fitness and ability to do any particular dive. Experience was also cited as a significant factor, with occasional divers at higher risk than regular divers, and the majority of fatalities had only entry level or slightly higher qualification ("Advanced open-water diver" certification is included in this grouping).

A large percentage (40 to 60%) of deaths in the Edmonds summary were associated with panic, a psychological reaction to stress which is characterized by irrational and unhelpful behaviour, which reduces the chances of survival. Panic typically occurs when a susceptible diver is in a threatening and unfamiliar situation, such as running out of breathing gas, or loss of ability to control depth, and is commonly complicated by inappropriate response to the triggering situation, which generally makes the situation worse. Evidence of panic is derived from behavioural reports from eyewitnesses.

==== Inadequate gas supply ====
The ANZ survey found in 56% of fatalities and the DAN survey in 41%, that the diver was either running low or was out of breathing gas. When equipment was tested following death, few victims had an ample gas supply remaining. The surveys indicated that most problems started when the diver became aware of a low on air situation. 8% of the divers died while trying to snorkel on the surface, apparently trying to conserve air. Concern about a shortage of air may affect the diver's ability to cope with a second problem which may develop during the dive, or may cause the diver to surface early and possibly alone in a stressed state of mind, where he is then unable to cope with surface conditions.

==== Buoyancy problems ====
In the ANZ survey, 52% of the fatalities had buoyancy problems. Most of these were due to inadequate buoyancy, but 8% had excessive buoyancy. In the DAN survey buoyancy problems were the most common trigger event leading to death. Buoyancy changes associated with wetsuits were found to be a significant factor. Based on a formula for approximate weight requirement based on wetsuit style and thickness, 40% of the divers who died were found to be grossly over-weighted at the surface. This would have been aggravated by suit compression at depth.

A correctly weighted diver should be neutrally buoyant at or near the surface with cylinders nearly empty. In this state, descent and ascent are equally easy. This requires the diver to be slightly negative at the start of the dive, due to the weight of the gas in the full cylinders, but this and the buoyancy loss due to suit compression should be easily compensated by partial inflation of the buoyancy compensator. The practice of over-weighting is dangerous at it may overwhelm the capacity of the buoyancy compensator and makes the buoyancy changes with depth more extreme and difficult to correct. A failure of the buoyancy compensator would be exacerbated. This dangerous practice is unfortunately promoted by some instructors as it expedites shallow water training and allows divers to learn to descend without fully learning the appropriate skills. Greater skill is required to dive safely with more weight than is necessary, but no amount of skill can compensate for insufficient weighting during decompression stops. On dives where decompression is planned, competent divers will often carry a bit more weight than strictly necessary to ensure that in a situation where they have lost or used up all their gas and are relying on a supply from a team member, they do not have to struggle to stay down at the correct stop depth. Some divers may be unaware of the need to adjust weight to suit any change in equipment that may affect buoyancy, due to inadequate training. Some dive shops do not provide facilities for the diver to adjust weighting to suit the combined equipment when renting a full set of gear to someone who has not used that combination before, and just add a few weights to ensure the diver can get down at the start of the dive.

In a survey on buddy diver fatality it was found that regardless of who was first to be low on air, the over-weighted diver was six times more likely to die.

In spite of being heavily reliant on their buoyancy compensators, many divers also misused them. Examples of this include accidental inflation or over-inflation causing rapid uncontrolled ascents, confusion between the inflation and dump valves, and inadequate or slow inflation due to being deep or low on air. The drag caused by a buoyancy compensator inflated to offset the weight belt can contribute to exhaustion in divers attempting to swim to safety on the surface. The American Academy of Underwater Sciences reported in 1989 that half the cases of decompression sickness were related to loss of buoyancy control. When twin-bladder buoyancy compensators are used, confusion as to how much gas is in each bladder can lead to a delay in appropriate response, by which time control of the ascent may have already been lost.

===== Failure to ditch weights =====
90% of the fatalities did not ditch their weights. Those on the surface had to swim towards safety carrying several kilograms of unnecessary weight, which made staying at the surface more difficult than it needed to be. In some fatalities the weights had been released but became entangled. In other cases, the belt could not be released because it was worn under other equipment, or the release buckle was inaccessible because a weight had slid over it, or it had rotated to the back of the body. Other fatalities have occurred where release mechanisms have failed.

==== Buddy system failures ====
In spite of the general acceptance, teaching and recommendation of the buddy system by most, if not all diver certification organisations, only 14% of divers who died still had their buddy with them at the time. In a Hawaiian study 19% of the fatalities died with their buddy present. In the ANZ study 33% of the fatalities either dived alone or voluntarily separated from their buddies before the incident, 25% separated after a problem developed and 20% were separated by the problem. In the DAN study, 57% of those who started diving with a buddy were separated at the time of death.

The buddy is primarily there to assist when things go wrong to the extent that the diver cannot cope alone, and the absence of a buddy is not in itself a threat to life. Buddy separation cannot be a cause of death, it is simply a failure of an engineering redundancy, leaving the diver without backup in case of specific emergencies, and the appropriate response is to abort the dive, as for any other failure of a singly redundant safety critical item. However, unplanned buddy separation may imply that the missing buddy has already run into trouble beyond their capacity to resolve. A common cause of separation was one diver running low on air and leaving their buddy to continue the dive alone. In some cases more than two divers dived together, without adequate team planning, leading to confusion as to who was responsible for whom. Groups of divers following a dive leader without formal buddy pairing before the dive would be split into pairs to surface by the dive leader as they reached low air status. This would frequently pair the least experienced and competent divers for the ascent including those over-breathing due to anxiety.

In others cases, the survivor was leading the victim and not immediately aware of the problem. It is common for the more experienced diver to lead, and also common for the follower not to remain in a position where he can easily be monitored, so the follower may only get intermittent attention and may be inconveniently situated when something goes wrong. By the time the lead diver notices the absence of the buddy it may be too late to assist. Each buddy is responsible for ensuring that the other knows where they are at all times.

===== Buddy rescue =====
In a minority of cases the buddy was present at the time of death. In 1% of cases the buddy died attempting rescue. In at least one case the survivor had to forcibly retrieve their primary demand valve from a buddy who was apparently unwilling or unable to share it after the secondary demand valve was rejected during an assisted ascent.

===== Buddy breathing =====
4% of fatalities were associated with failed buddy breathing.

In a study of failed buddy breathing conducted by NUADC, more than half were attempted at depths greater than 20 metres. In 29% the victim's mask was displaced, and a lung over-pressure injury occurred in 12.5% of cases. One in 8 victims refused to return the demand valve, however, donating a regulator rarely results in the donor becoming the victim. The use of a secondary (octopus regulator) second stage or a completely separate emergency air supply (bailout cylinder) would appear to be a safer alternative.

=== Physiological factors ===
A survey of DAN America members during 2000 to 2006 indicated a low incidence of cardiac-related fatalities in divers less than 40 years old. The rates increased until about 50 years old and stabilised for older divers at a relative risk of approximately 13 times greater than for younger divers. Relative risk for older divers was also found to be greater for asphyxia (3.9 times) and arterial gas embolism (2.5 times). Relative risk between males and females reduced from about 6 to 1 at 25 years to even at 65 years. DAN Europe statistics follow a similar trend.

The victim had a pre-existing condition which would widely be considered a contraindication to diving in about 25% of fatalities. Some disorders have no demonstrable pathology and are easily overlooked in an investigation, which results in incomplete understanding of the incident. Drowning can obscure some pathologies which may then not show up at autopsy.

Fatigue was a factor in a significant number of cases (28% according to Edmonds). Fatigue is caused by excessive exertion, is aggravated by physical unfitness, and reduces the reserves available for survival. Factors cited as causes of fatigue include excessive drag due to over-weighting, drag due to over-inflation of the BCD, and long surface swims in adverse sea conditions, and it was not restricted to unfit divers. Fatigue was also associated with salt-water aspiration syndrome, cardiac problems, asthma, and high breathing as density.

Salt water aspiration was a factor in 37% of cases in the Edmonds summary. This refers to inhalation of a small amount of sea water by the conscious diver, often in the form of spray. Salt water aspiration may be caused by a regulator leak, rough conditions on the surface, or residual water in the regulator after regulator recovery or buddy breathing. Salt water aspiration may cause respiratory distress, fatigue or panic and other complications.

Autopsy evidence of pulmonary barotrauma was found in 13% of the cases summarised by Edmonds et al. This was sometimes a complicating factor, but at other times the direct cause of death. Factors associated with pulmonary barotrauma include panic, rapid buoyant ascent, asthma and regulator failure. In half of these cases a cause for the barotrauma was identified, but a roughly equal number remain unexplained.

In cases where the Edmonds summary found cardiac failure was implicated there was either gross cardiac pathology or a clinical indication of cardiac disease in the autopsy findings. 26% of deaths in the DAN studies were due to cardiac failure. 60% of these victims complained of chest pain, dyspnoea or feeling unwell before or during the dive. Cardiac causes are implicated in about 45% of scuba deaths in divers over 40 years old, and they tend to be relatively experienced divers, frequently with a history of cardiac disease or high blood pressure. The associated triggers include exercise, drugs, hypoxia from salt water aspiration, cardio-pulmonary reflexes, respiratory abnormalities, restrictive dive suits and harness, and cold exposure.

in at least 9% of fatalities in the ANZ survey cited by Edmonds et al. the diver was asthmatic, and in at least 8% of the cases asthma contributed to the death. In other surveys this correlation is not so clear. Surveys have shown that between 0.5% and 1% of recreational divers are asthmatics. Edmonds considers that the statistics imply that asthma is a significant risk factor and that asthmatics should not be permitted to dive. This opinion was prevalent for a long time, but recent studies by DAN suggest that asthma may be managed successfully in some cases. Factors contributing to death in this group include panic, fatigue and salt water aspiration, and the cause of death was usually drowning or pulmonary barotrauma. The diving environment can provoke or aggravate asthma in several ways, such as salt water aspiration, breathing cold dry air, strenuous exertion, hyperventilation. and high work of breathing.

In 10% of the cases summarised by Edmonds et al., vomiting initiated or contributed to the accident. It was often caused by sea sickness or salt water aspiration or ingestion, but ear problems and alcohol were also cited as causes.

Nitrogen narcosis was cited as a contributory or triggering factor in 9% of cases reviewed by Edmonds et al., but was never the sole cause of death.

Respiratory disease was cited as a factor in 7% of cases by Edmonds. Chronic bronchitis, pleural adhesions, chest injury and other respiratory conditions may pre-exist in the diver, and though a small minority of divers have these conditions, the frequency with which they are associated with fatalities suggest they may have been contributory.

Recreational drugs such as alcohol and cannabis have been implicated in many drownings, and cocaine is associated with sudden death in athletes. Edmonds reported an association between drugs used for treating hypertiension and asthma with sudden death syndrome.

Few recreational divers die as a consequence of decompression sickness, and it is more likely in technical divers exposed to considerably greater depths, and professional divers, but it is a significant cause of serious disability according to Edmonds.

High work of breathing is more likely to occur with high density breathing gas, which is lass likely with helium based gas mixtures and most likely on deeper dives, and with rebreathers, particularly if they have not been optimised for low work of breathing, or have been packed with small granule absorbent, or are partially flooded, as all of these affect gas flow resistance and therefore work of breathing. Back mounted counterlungs can cause a degree of negative pressure breathing which can aggravate bronchial restriction. High work of breathing can cause carbon dioxide buildup, and eventually hypercapnia and associated panic. This can overwhelm the diver and may be impossible to reverse without reducing gas density or bailing out to open circuit.

=== Equipment ===
Edmonds et al. (2014) suggest that a significant percentage of deaths are associated with equipment failure (35%) or misuse (35%), while the diving fatalities workshop of 2012 found that equipment failure per se was uncommon. This is not necessarily contradictory, as they include incompetent operation under equipment failure and specify overlap between malfunction and misuse.

In 14% of deaths there was a regulator fault reported, and in 1% the regulator was misused. Subsequent testing of the regulators showed that most of the problems were caused by leaks resulting in inhalation of salt water, but in some cases there was excessive breathing resistance following a mechanical dysfunction. In a few cases the regulator failed catastrophically, or the hose burst. The difficulty of breathing from the regulator was often aggravated by other factors such as panic, exhaustion or badly adjusted buoyancy.

In 8% of cases the buoyancy compensator malfunctioned. This was usually due to a problem with the inflator mechanism, but in some cases the BCD could not stay inflated. In 6% of the fatalities, the buoyancy compensator was not used competently, usually by overinflation which caused an uncontrolled ascent, or deflating when more buoyancy was required at the surface. Overweighting can also be classified as misuse of equipment.

Edmonds et al. found that 13% of victims lost one or both fins. This was sometimes due to defective or ill-fitting fins, but in most cases the cause was not apparent. In 12% of deaths there were problems associated with the cylinder, usually from user error, such as use of an underfilled or undersized cylinder, the cylinder becoming unsecured from the harness, and failure to open the cylinder valve. In less than 5% of fatalities, there were problems due to malfunction or misuse of weight belt (excluding overweighting which is not a failure of the equipment), harness, mask, exposure suit, submersible pressure gauges and entanglement in lines deployed by the diver.

=== Environment ===
Edmonds et al. indicate that 25% of fatal incidents started at the surface, and 50% of the divers died at the surface. In many cases, the divers surfaced because they ran out of breathing air.

Difficult water conditions were implicated in 36% of fatalities in the Edmonds et al. summary. These included current stronger than the diver could manage, rough water, surf, surge from wave movement, and impaired visibility caused by these conditions. These conditions were frequently encountered when the diver was obliged to surface in an unsuitable place due to earlier problems, and were often exacerbated by overweighting and/or the high drag of an excessively inflated buoyancy compensator, leading to exhaustion or panic which resulted in drowning.

Excessive depth was considered a factor in 12% of fatalities summarized by Edmonds et al. The fatal dive was often the deepest ever for the victim. Greater depth can expose a diver to factors such as increased air consumption, impaired judgment caused by nitrogen narcosis, colder water, reduced thermal insulation of a compressed wetsuit, reduced visibility and lighting, slower response of buoyancy compensator inflation, increased work of breathing, greater heat loss when using helium mixtures, higher risk of decompression sickness and a necessarily prolonged ascent time.

Other environmental factors cited as contributory to fatalities include caves, marine animal injury (including shark and other animal bites, and marine stings, difficulties entering and exiting the water, cold, entanglements, entrapment, and night diving.

== Accident investigation ==
Lack of solid information about the underlying causes of diving accidents and fatalities creates uncertainty, and this is the principal factor leading to litigation, higher insurance premiums, massive litigation costs and ultimately the continued loss of life.

— David G. Concannon, 2011

Diving fatality investigations are intended to find the cause of death by identifying factors that caused the fatal incident. Causes of diving accidents are the triggering events that when combined with inadequate response, lead to an adverse consequence which may be classified as a notifiable incident or an accident when injury or death follows. These causes can be categorised as human factors, equipment problems and environmental factors. Equipment problems and environmental factors are also often influenced by human error. Three main areas of investigation are common:

- Medical investigation looks into the diver's health and medical factors that may have led to the cause of death.
- Equipment is investigated to look for issues that may have contributed to a cause of death.
- Procedural investigation considers whether the diver followed appropriate procedures, adequately prepared themselves and their equipment before diving, or went diving in conditions beyond their training and experience level.

There is usually some form of investigation following a diving fatality. There may be several investigators representing different parties. Police are likely to look for evidence of homicide, The maritime safety authority will investigate in cases where a death occurs while diving from a vessel. When the fatality involves a person at work, the occupational health and safety authority may investigate, and investigators from the deceased's, insurance company and the dive operator and certification agency's insurance companies are likely to be involved.

In most cases, the investigation takes place some time after the event. In cases where death has already occurred, the police may meet the boat, or travel to a shore site. An investigation by someone representing a sector of the diving industry may not take place until weeks or even months after the incident. It depends on how soon the event is reported, how long the paperwork takes, how soon the insurance carrier appoints an investigator and availability of a suitable investigator. No matter how quickly an investigation is launched, in most cases the body will have been recovered and resuscitation attempted, equipment will have been removed and possibly damaged or lost, and the people at the site returned to their homes. The equipment may have been mishandled by authorities who are unfamiliar with the gear and have stored it improperly, compromising the evidence.

People who would be likely to be considered witnesses include:

- Any instructional staff involved if it was a training dive.
- Any crew-members of the boat if the dive was off a boat.
- Other divers who were diving at the site at the time of the incident.
- Any rescue and recovery personnel who may have been involved.
- Any members of a professional dive team if one of their members was involved.

Fatal incidents are less likely to occur during surface-supplied diving operations, even though the diving environment may be more hazardous, as the diver is supported by a diving team and the supervisor is able to monitor and communicate with the diver. The supply of breathing gas is more secure, and it is extremely unusual for the diver's umbilical to be severed, which means that the diver cannot normally get lost underwater.

=== Equipment testing ===
Equipment testing is an important part of dive accident and fatality analysis. As stakeholders in the community have different and occasionally conflicting needs when it comes to such testing, tests should be done as soon as possible to avoid degradation of evidence, and the testing should be done by impartial investigators, with all relevant equipment treated as evidence and legally acceptable procedures for controlling custody of the evidence. Currently the procedures for equipment testing after diving accidents are poorly standardized. Important procedural items include when testing should be conducted, who is responsible for the testing, what equipment should be tested and what tests should be done.

This requires appropriate training of first responders and law enforcement agencies, availability of testing equipment, development of suitable test protocols, and funding to conduct the testing. Procedures for testing rebreathers differ from those for testing open circuit equipment.

Life-support equipment is an integral part of diving, and dive equipment is generally robust and reliable, but bad maintenance, design flaws, improper use, or other factors may cause or contribute to an incident. When equipment issues are not contributory to an incident, they should be excluded so that the causative factors may be correctly determined.

=== Forensic autopsy ===
If diving fatalities are thoroughly investigated it may be possible to determine a trigger, or root cause, for the accident. Data collection and analysis allows identification of the most common triggers and contributing factors associated with fatal diving incidents. Forensic autopsies go beyond the detailed description of the internal organs and include a thorough external examination looking for injuries, injury patterns, trace evidence and clues to how the body and the environment may have interacted. Diving deaths are relatively uncommon, and may be unfamiliar to the pathologist.

The forensic pathologist also needs to understand the limitations of autopsy findings in diving-related deaths and realize that there are common postmortem artifacts that can be misinterpreted, resulting in erroneous conclusions.

— James Carruso, Regional Armed Forces Medical Examiner, Navy Recruiting Command 2011

== Legal issues ==
Scuba diving fatalities have a major financial impact by way of lost income, lost business, insurance premium increases and high litigation costs.

The lack of reliable and reasonably complete information about the underlying causes of diving fatalities creates uncertainty. Inaccurate findings following autopsies where the examiner had no experience in diving fatalities and had not followed the relevant protocols are common, and in the majority of cases the primary causative factors are never identified, leading to opportunistic litigation.
