= SDBA =

Special duty oxygen breathing apparatus, a military rebreather

The SDBA (Special Duty Oxygen Breathing Apparatus) is a type of frogman's rebreather breathing set. Many of the world's navies and army marine corps have used it since 1971.

It was made by Mercury Products in Billingshurst in England.

The breathing bag is square with rounded corners, on his chest, exposed. Its absorbent canister is cylindrical with flat ends, crosswise on his belly, about 10 inches long and 5.3 inches diameter, in a rubber sheath. It has a loop of wide corrugated breathing tubes; one of them originates at each end of the canister; the right tube has a side connection to let gas in and out of the breathing bag as he breathes. It has two long thin oxygen cylinders lengthwise on his back. It can be supplied with a mouthpiece with a neck strap; the mouthpiece has a valve on its front to close the breathing tubes when the mouthpiece is not in his mouth. Its dive duration is about 3 hours.

It had a nitrox variant called ONBA.

It was made from 1971 to the late 1990s. The firm that made it now makes only in-airliner wheelchairs.

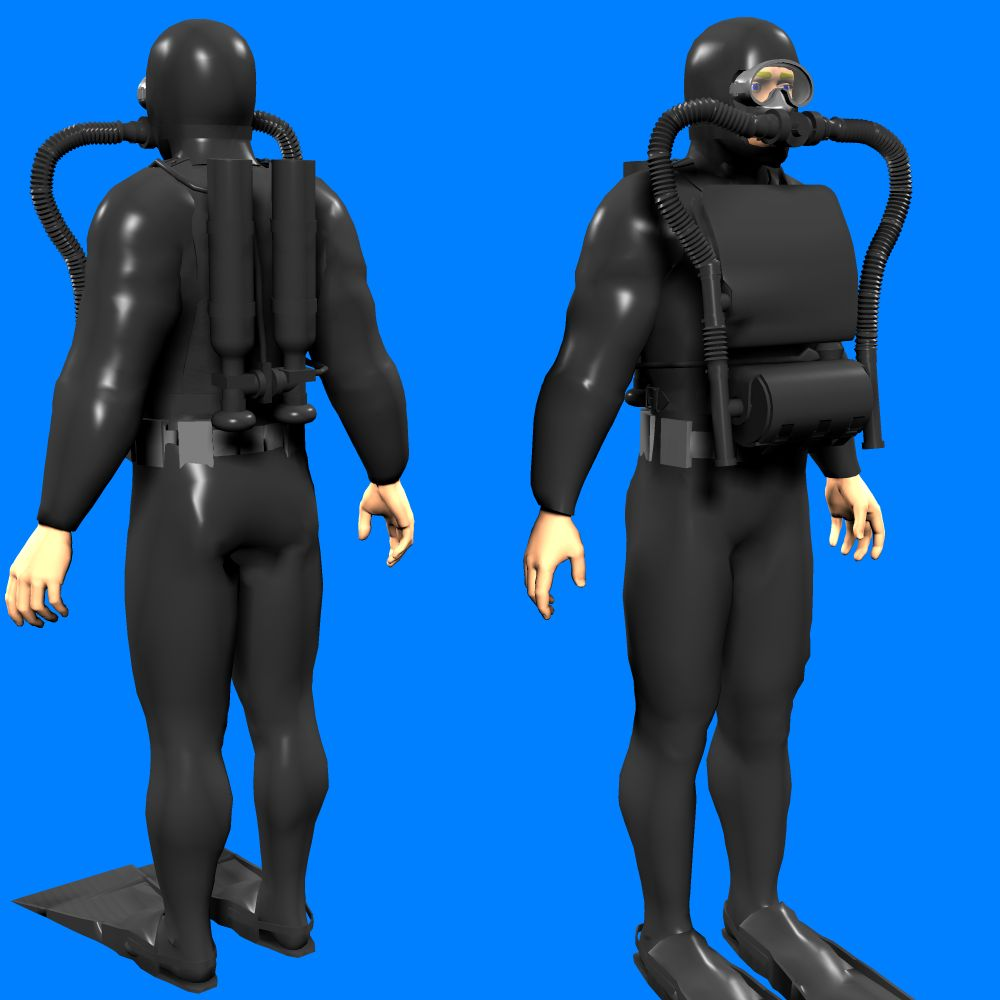
2 divers with SDBA rebreathers. CGI image.
