= Salt water aspiration syndrome =

Diving disorder caused by inhaling small quantities of salt water

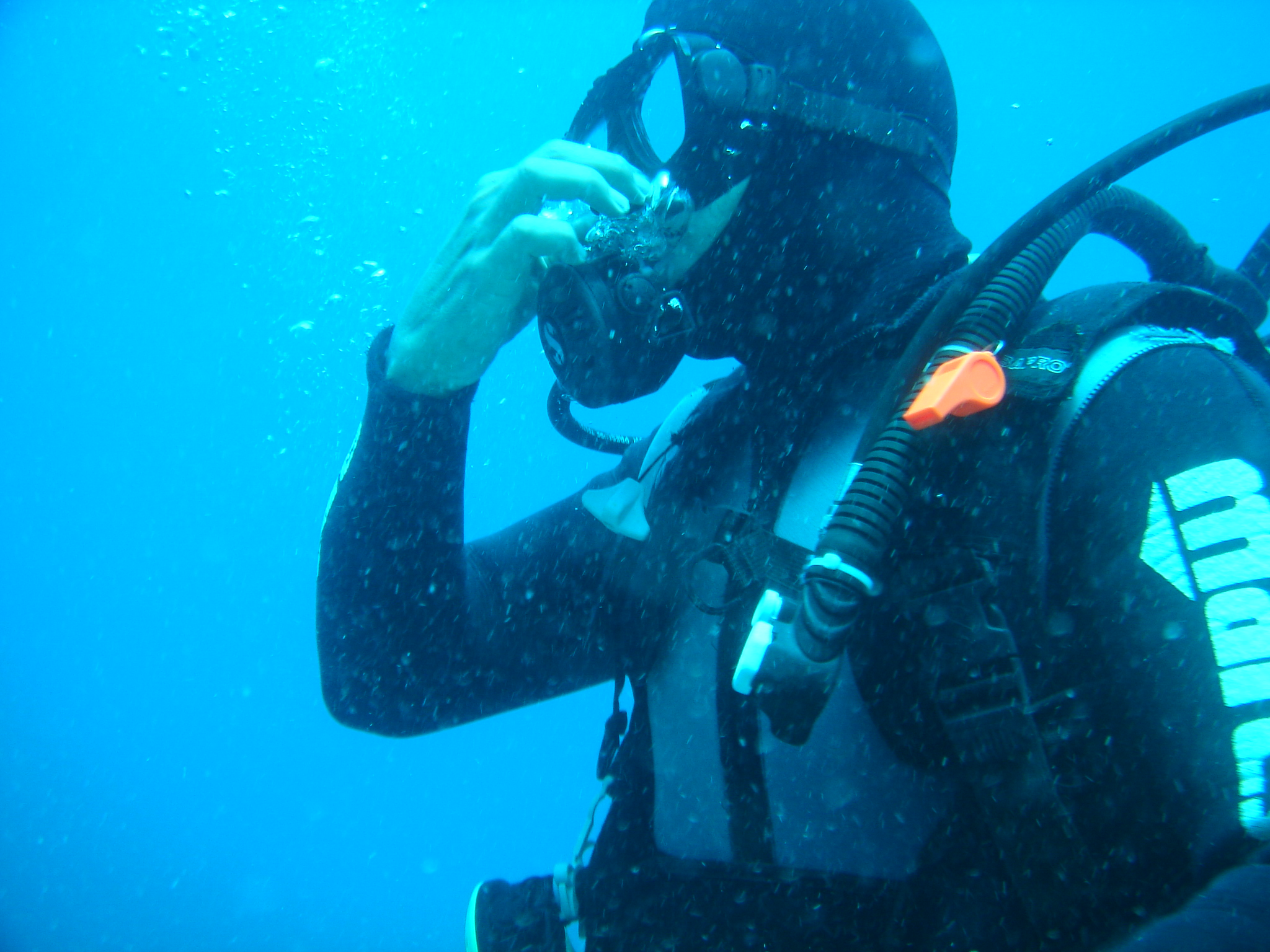
- Aspiration of salt water due to diving equipment malfunction or improper breathing techniques can go unnoticed, as the small size of water droplets may not trigger the upper airway's cough reflex.
- Specialty: Undersea medicine

Salt water aspiration syndrome or saltwater aspiration syndrome is a medical condition caused by the inhalation or aspiration (entry of materials into lungs from mouth) of small amounts of salt water during an underwater dive, leading to lung irritation and inflammation. Unlike drowning or near-drowning, it does not involve ingestion of large volumes of water. It often results from faulty diving equipment or improper breathing techniques, allowing fine water droplets to reach the lower respiratory tract.

The condition begins with a cough, followed by shortness of breath, chest discomfort or pain, shivering, fever and other systemic symptoms. It can resemble a viral infection but improves within hours, especially with supplemental oxygen. While most cases resolve on their own, severe instances may require critical care. Diagnosis is based on clinical history and symptom progression. Salt water aspiration syndrome was first described in 1970.

== Mechanism ==
Salt water aspiration syndrome occurs when small amounts of salt water are inhaled or aspirated, unlike drowning and near-drowning which involve intake of large volumes of water. This condition can develop subtly over the course of an underwater dive or happen with a single aspiration event. Faulty diving equipment such as diving regulators, improper breathing techniques, or buddy breathing lead to the inhalation or aspiration of fine salt water droplets. The small size of the droplets allows them to reach the lower respiratory tract without significantly triggering the upper airway's cough reflex, hence getting aspirated without causing immediate symptoms during the dive.

Hypertonic salt water—being more concentrated than human blood—creates an osmotic gradient when it enters the lungs. This gradient draws water out of surrounding lung tissues into the alveoli and bronchioles, leading to irritation and inflammation. Salt water can also cause oxidative stress, dilution of pulmonary surfactant, breakdown of the blood-air barrier, cellular degradation and cell death. Marine microorganisms and particulates can further exacerbate inflammatory processes, which may cause or contribute towards systemic symptoms seen with this condition.

== Presentation ==
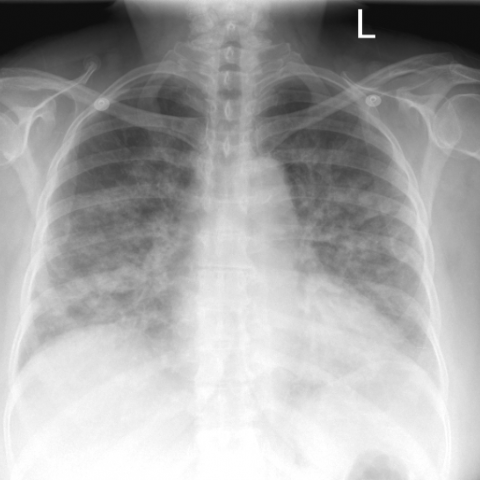
Acute pulmonary edema due to salt water aspiration syndrome

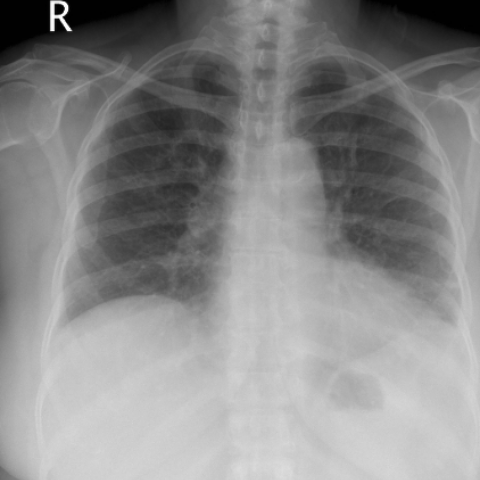
Recovery after 48 hours of supplemental oxygen

Chest x-rays of a 61-year-old female who developed salt water aspiration syndrome while swimming during a triathlon.

Most patients with salt water aspiration syndrome report experiencing aspiration during their dive. Affected individuals start with a cough immediately after completing the dive, (Note: Likely a cough reflex triggered by irritation of the lower airways, which is suppressed during the dive due to unclear reasons.) sometimes productive of excessive or blood-tinged sputum. Following a latency period of about two hours, divers may develop shortness of breath, increased respiratory rate, increased heart rate, bluish skin, chest discomfort and pain.

The condition generally mimics symptoms of a viral infection. Fever, malaise and chills are most commonly reported, and usually the first systemic symptoms to appear. Most individuals experience tremors and shivering — the latter is worse with reduced oxygen levels in blood. These symptoms tend to worsen with cold exposure or physical activity. Headaches are reported in about two-thirds of cases, while about one-third experience body aches. Gastrointestinal involvement can cause loss of appetite, nausea and vomiting. Less commonly, affected individuals experience fainting, temporary loss of consciousness and mild confusion. In rare cases, severe inflammation of lungs can occur.

Lung auscultation may reveal abnormal breath sounds such as rhonchi (snoring-like) or crackles (rattling), and chest imaging can show lung consolidations and edema. Decreased lung volumes, including a reduction of average 0.7 liters in forced expiratory volume in 1 second and vital capacity, is found on spirometry. Laboratory studies do not show specific abnormalities, but low oxygen levels in blood, slightly elevated white blood cell count and lactate dehydrogenase levels may be seen.

== Diagnosis and treatment ==
The diagnosis of salt water aspiration syndrome is based on medical history and physical examination. Its initial symptoms of cough and difficulty breathing are similar to near-drowning, however, near-drowning does not cause viral infection-like symptoms. Furthermore, it can be difficult to distinguish the condition from an acute viral infection at first; unlike viral illnesses, salt water aspiration syndrome tends to improve within a few hours.

The condition shares features with decompression sickness; a review of the dive profile and the absence of other symptoms associated with decompression can help distinguish between the two. (Note: A dive profile with decompression stops and slow gradual ascent would be less likely to cause decompression sickness. Additionally, short duration and depth of dives would be less likely to cause decompression sickness.) Significant improvement following supplemental oxygen further supports the diagnosis of salt water aspiration syndrome. (Note: In contrast, decompression sickness shows significant improvement with hyperbaric oxygen therapy, whereas supplemental oxygen only helps to stabilize the affected individual.) Other diving conditions like pulmonary barotrauma, immersion pulmonary edema and low body temperatures can produce similar symptoms or occur alongside this syndrome; these can be distinguished through the clinical course and imaging results.

Treatment involves supportive care with supplemental oxygen, observation and rest. Most cases resolve within the first 24 hours, often spontaneously without treatment. Critical care may be necessary for severe cases or cases complicated with underlying respiratory disorders.

== Research ==
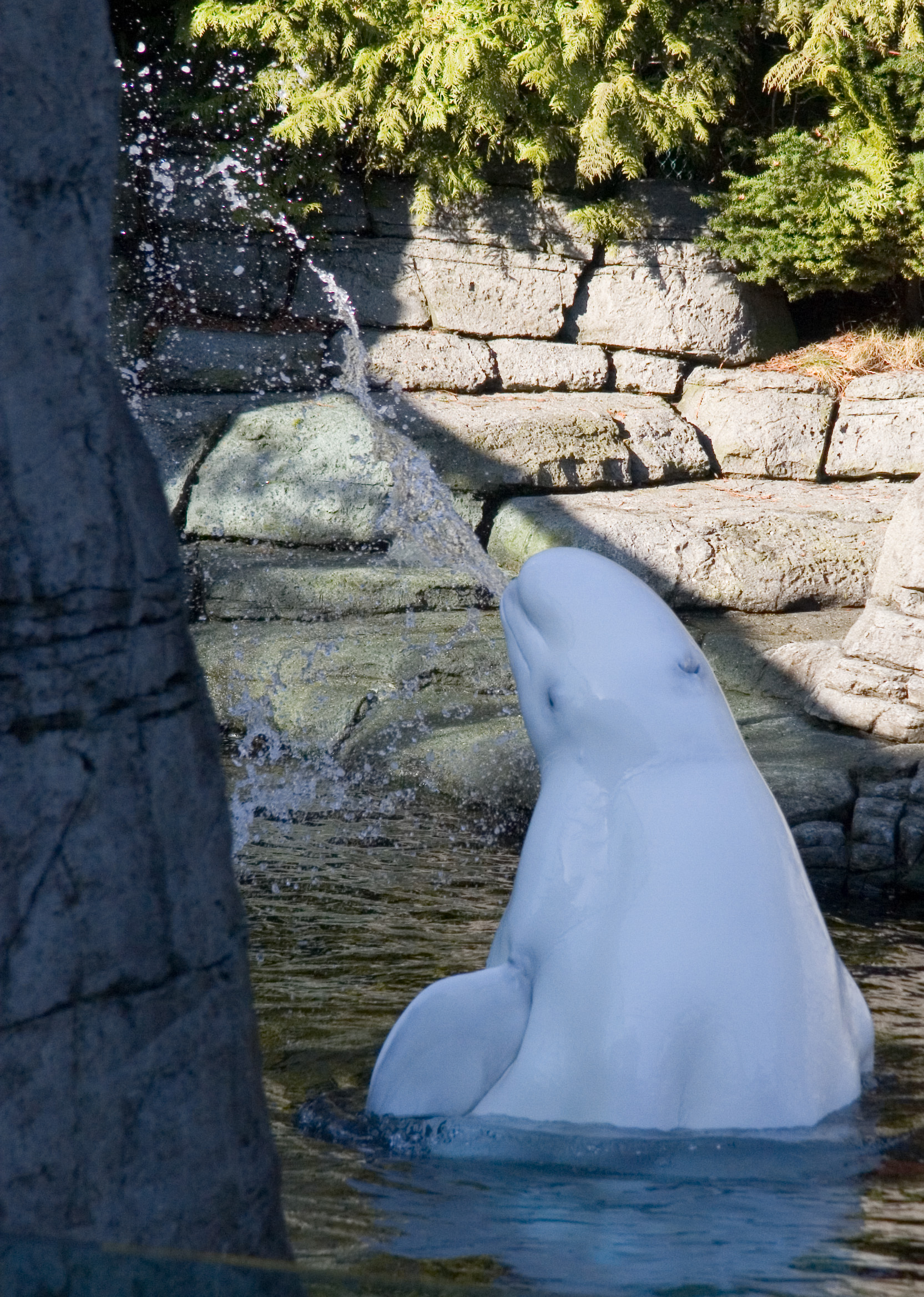
Beluga whales at Georgia Aquarium splash audience members as a part of their show.

The condition was first described in 1970 by Carl Edmonds, who documented 30 cases at the Royal Australian Navy's HMAS Penguin. A 1989 study estimated that 37 percent of deaths that occurred during recreational scuba diving in Australia and New Zealand in the 1980s involved salt water aspiration syndrome. The study hypothesized—based on reports of the victim's symptoms and an analysis of their equipment—that the syndrome acted as an intermediate factor, exacerbating panic and exhaustion, which subsequently led to loss of consciousness and death by drowning. In 2019, a case study reported severe salt water aspiration syndrome that occurred during a beluga whale encounter; an audience member at Georgia Aquarium aspirated salt water that a beluga whale splashed, which led to severe inflammation of lungs and low oxygen levels in blood requiring supplemental oxygen in the intensive care unit.

== See also ==
- Aspiration pneumonia – Infection caused due to gastrointestinal contents entering the lungs
- Hypernatremia – High sodium concentration in the blood
- Salt poisoning – Intoxication from excessive intake of sodium
- Swimming-induced pulmonary edema – Body fluid leakage in the lungs while swimming
