= Deep diving =

Underwater diving to a depth beyond the norm

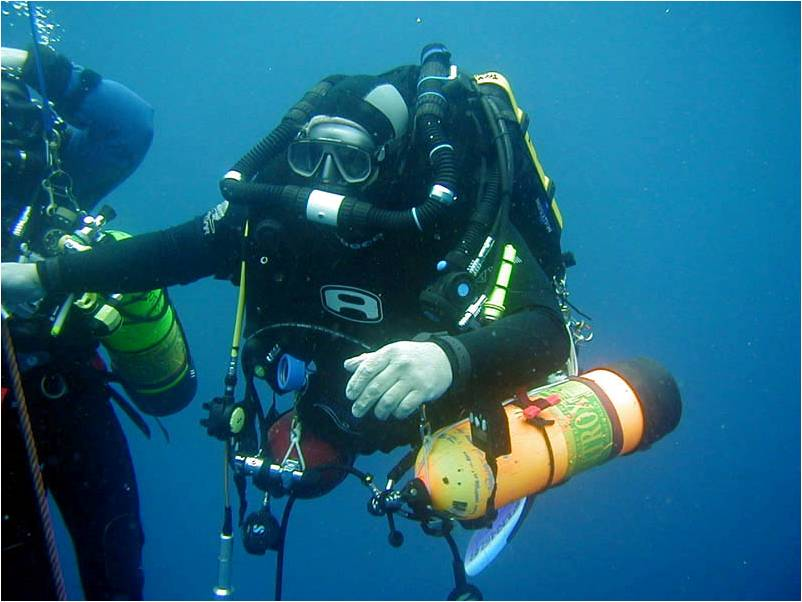
Wreck diver Trevor Jackson using a rebreather with open circuit bailout cylinders returning from a 180-metre (590 ft) dive.

Deep diving is underwater diving to a depth beyond the normal range accepted by the associated community. In some cases this is a prescribed limit established by an authority, while in others it is associated with a level of certification or training, and it may vary depending on whether the diving is recreational, technical or commercial. Nitrogen narcosis becomes a hazard below 30 metres (98 ft) and hypoxic breathing gas is required below 60 metres (200 ft) to lessen the risk of oxygen toxicity.

For some recreational diving agencies, "Deep diving", or "Deep diver" may be a certification awarded to divers that have been trained to dive to a specified depth range, generally deeper than 30 metres (98 ft). However, the Professional Association of Diving Instructors (PADI) defines anything from 18 to 30 metres (59 to 98 ft) as a "deep dive" in the context of recreational diving (other diving organisations vary), and considers deep diving a form of technical diving. In technical diving, a depth below about 60 metres (200 ft) where hypoxic breathing gas becomes necessary to avoid oxygen toxicity may be considered a deep dive. In professional diving, a depth that requires special equipment, procedures, or advanced training may be considered a deep dive.

Deep diving can mean something else in the commercial diving field. For instance early experiments carried out by COMEX using heliox and trimix attained far greater depths than any recreational technical diving. One example being its "Janus 4" open-sea dive to 501 metres (1,640 ft) in 1977.

The open-sea diving depth record was achieved in 1988 by a team of COMEX and French Navy divers who performed pipeline connection exercises at a depth of 534 metres (1,750 ft) in the Mediterranean Sea as part of the "Hydra 8" programme employing heliox and hydrox. The latter avoids the high-pressure nervous syndrome (HPNS) caused by helium and eases breathing due to its lower density. These divers needed to breathe special gas mixtures because they were exposed to very high ambient pressure (more than 54 times atmospheric pressure).

An atmospheric diving suit (ADS) allows very deep dives of up to 700 metres (2,300 ft). These suits are capable of withstanding the pressure at great depth permitting the diver to remain at normal atmospheric pressure. This eliminates the problems associated with breathing pressurised gases. In 2006 Chief Navy Diver Daniel Jackson set a record of 610 metres (2,000 ft) in an ADS.

On 20 November 1992 COMEX's "Hydra 10" experiment simulated a dive in an onshore hyperbaric chamber with hydreliox. Théo Mavrostomos spent two hours at a simulated depth of 701 metres (2,300 ft).

== Depth ranges in underwater diving ==
Assumed is the surface of the waterbody to be at or near sea level and underlies atmospheric pressure.

Not included are the differing ranges of freediving – without breathing during a dive.

Depth (Note: All depths specified for sea water. Fractionally deeper depths may apply in relation to freshwater due to its lower density.)	Comments
12 m (39 ft)	Recreational diving limit for divers aged under 12 years old and EN 14153-1 / ISO 24801-1 level 1 (Supervised Diver) standard.
18 m (60 ft)	Recreational diving limit for Open Water Divers (e.g. PADI, NAUI).
20 m (66 ft)	Recreational diving limit for EN 14153-2 ISO 24801-2 level 2 "Autonomous Diver" standard.
21 m (69 ft)	GUE Recreational Diver Level 1.
30 m (98 ft)	Recommended recreational diving limit for PADI Advanced Open Water divers and GUE Recreational Diver Level 2. Average depth at which nitrogen narcosis symptoms begin to be noticeable in adults.
40 m (130 ft)	Depth limit for divers specified by Recreational Scuba Training Council and GUE Recreational Diver Level 3. Depth limit for a French level 2 diver accompanied by an instructor (level 4 diver), breathing air.
50 m (160 ft)	The widely accepted depth limit for divers breathing compressed air. This value is specified by the British Sub-Aqua Club, Sub-Aqua Association and PADI
60 m (200 ft)	Depth limit for a group of 2 to 3 French Level 3 recreational divers, breathing air.
66 m (217 ft)	Depth at which breathing compressed air exposes the diver to an oxygen partial pressure of 1.6 bar (23 psi). Greater depth is considered to expose the diver to an unacceptable risk of oxygen toxicity. (Note: Oxygen toxicity depends upon a combination of partial pressure and time of exposure, individual physiology, and other factors not fully understood. NOAA recommends that divers do not expose themselves to breathing oxygen at greater than 1.6 bar pO_{2}, which occurs at 66 metres (217 ft) when breathing air.)
67 m (220 ft)	Depth requirement for the PSAI Level 6 Narcosis Management Course which has divers complete the course on compressed air
73 m (240 ft)	Depth requirement for the PSAI Level 7 Narcosis Management Course. This represents the deepest scuba course divers can complete on compressed air.
90 m (300 ft)	Maximum depth limit for the PADI Trimix Diver Course. Following course completion certified divers are authorised to make Trimix dives in excess of 90 m (300 ft)
100 m (330 ft)	One of the recommended technical diving limits. Maximum depth authorised for divers who have completed Trimix Diver certification with IANTD or Advanced Trimix Diver certification with TDI.
156 m (512 ft)	Deepest scuba dive on compressed air (July 1999 in Puerto Galera, Philippines).
200 m (660 ft)	Limit for surface light penetration sufficient for plant growth in clear water, though some visibility may be possible farther down. (Note: Assuming crystal clear water; surface light may disappear completely at much shallower depths in murky conditions. Minimal visibility is still possible far deeper. Deep sea explorer William Beebe reported seeing blueness, not blackness, at 1400 feet (424 metres). "I peered down and again I felt the old longing to go farther, although it looked like the black pit-mouth of hell itself—yet still showed blue." (William Beebe, "A Round Trip to Davey Jones's Locker", The National Geographic Magazine, June 1931, p. 660.))
230 m (750 ft)	First dive on a hydrox-rebreather (14 February 2023 in the Pearse Resurgence, New Zealand).
290 m (950 ft)	Deepest ocean dive on a rebreather (23 March 2014 in Gili Trawangan, Indonesia).
338 m (1,109 ft)	Deepest dive on a rebreather, deepest cave diving on a rebreather, deepest dive on trimix (17 October 2026 in Matka Canyon, North Macedonia).
534 m (1,752 ft)	COMEX Hydra 8 dives on hydreliox (February 1988 offshore Marseille, France).

== Particular problems associated with deep dives ==
Deep diving has more hazards and greater risk than basic open-water diving. Nitrogen narcosis, the "narks" or "rapture of the deep", starts with feelings of euphoria and over-confidence but then leads to numbness and memory impairment similar to alcohol intoxication. Decompression sickness, or the "bends", can happen if a diver ascends too rapidly, when excess inert gas leaves solution in the blood and tissues and forms bubbles. These bubbles produce mechanical and biochemical effects that lead to the condition. The onset of symptoms depends on the severity of the tissue gas loading and may develop during ascent in severe cases, but is frequently delayed until after reaching the surface. Bone degeneration (dysbaric osteonecrosis) is caused by the bubbles forming inside the bones; most commonly the upper arm and the thighs. Deep diving involves a much greater danger of all of these, and presents the additional risk of oxygen toxicity, which may lead to convulsions underwater. Very deep diving using a helium-oxygen mixture (heliox) or a hydrogen-helium-oxygen mixture (hydreliox) carries the risk of high-pressure nervous syndrome and hydrogen narcosis. Coping with the physical and physiological stresses of deep diving requires good physical conditioning.

Using open-circuit scuba equipment, consumption of breathing gas is proportional to ambient pressure – so at 50 metres (164 ft), where the pressure is 6 bars (87 psi), a diver breathes six times as much as on the surface (1 bar, 14.5 psi). Heavy physical exertion makes the diver breathe even more gas, and gas becomes denser requiring increased effort to breathe with depth, leading to increased risk of hypercapnia – an excess of carbon dioxide in the blood. The need to do decompression stops increases with depth. A diver at 6 metres (20 ft) may be able to dive for many hours without needing to do decompression stops. At depths greater than 40 metres (131 ft), a diver may have only a few minutes at the deepest part of the dive before decompression stops are needed. In the event of an emergency, the diver cannot make an immediate ascent to the surface without risking decompression sickness. All of these considerations result in the amount of breathing gas required for deep diving being much greater than for shallow open water diving. The diver needs a disciplined approach to planning and conducting dives to minimise these additional risks.

Many of these problems are avoided by the use of surface supplied breathing gas, closed diving bells, and saturation diving, at the cost of logistical complexity, reduced maneuverability of the diver, and greater expense.

=== Limiting factors ===
In ambient pressure diving the work of breathing is a major limitation. Carbon dioxide elimination is limited by the capacity of the diver to cycle breathing gas through the lungs, and when this reaches the maximum, carbon dioxide will build up in the tissues and the diver will succumb to acute hypercapnia. Work of breathing is affected by breathing gas density, which is a function of the gas mixture and the pressure due to depth.

In atmospheric pressure diving the limitations include the ability of the diver to bend the joints of the suit under pressure, and for the joints to remain watertight while bending.

== Dealing with depth ==
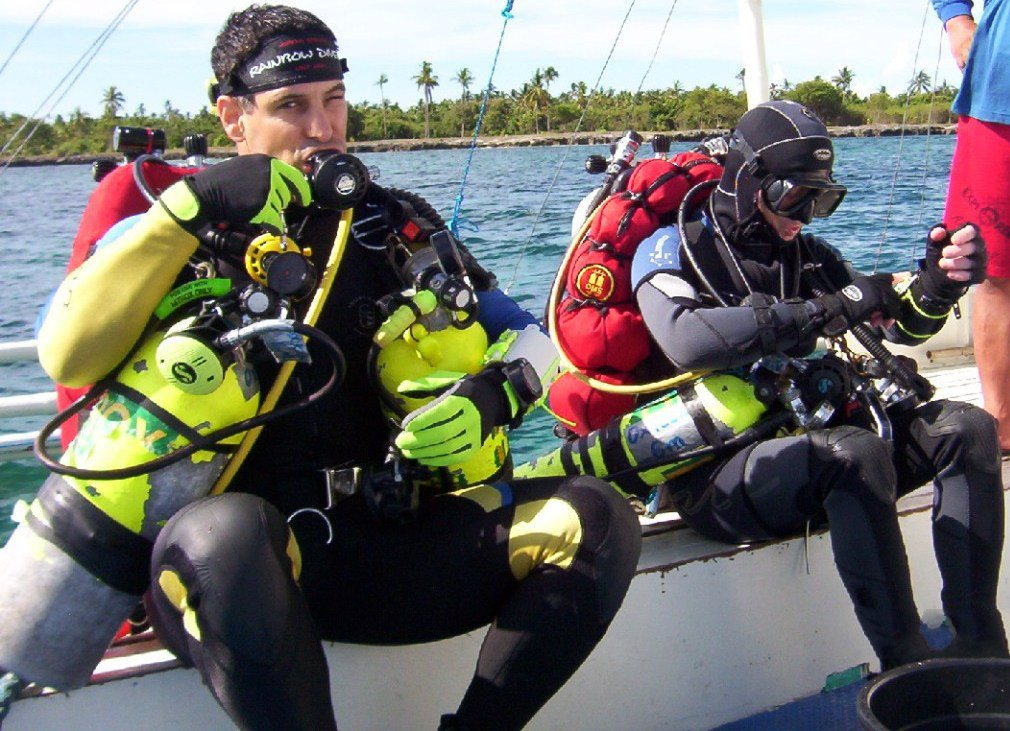
Technical divers preparing for a mixed-gas decompression dive. Note the backplate and wing setup with side mounted stage tanks containing EAN50 (left side) and pure oxygen (right side).

Both equipment and procedures can be adapted to deal with the problems of greater depth. Usually the two are combined, as the procedures must be adapted to suit the equipment, and in some cases the equipment is needed to facilitate the procedures.

=== Equipment adaptations for deeper diving ===
The equipment used for deep diving depends on both the depth and the type of diving. Scuba is limited to equipment that can be carried by the diver or is easily deployed by the dive team, while surface-supplied diving equipment can be more extensive, and much of it stays above the water where it is operated by the diving support team.

- Scuba divers carry larger volumes of breathing gas to compensate for the increased gas consumption and decompression stops.
- Rebreathers, though more complex, manage gas much more efficiently than open-circuit scuba.
- Use of helium-based breathing gases such as trimix reduces nitrogen narcosis and reduces the toxic effects of oxygen at depth.
- A diving shot, a decompression trapeze, or a decompression buoy can help divers control their ascent and return to the surface at a position that can be monitored by their surface support team at the end of a dive.
- Decompression can be accelerated by using specially blended breathing gas mixtures containing lower proportions of inert gas.
- Surface supply of breathing gases reduces the risk of running out of gas.
- In-water decompression can be minimized by using dry bells and decompression chambers.
- Hot-water suits can prevent hypothermia due to the high heat loss when using helium-based breathing gases.
- Diving bells and lockout submersibles expose the diver to the direct underwater environment for less time, and provide a relatively safe shelter that does not require decompression, with a dry environment where the diver can rest, take refreshment, and if necessary, receive first aid in an emergency.
- Breathing gas reclaim systems reduce the cost of using helium-based breathing gases, by recovering and recycling exhaled surface supplied gas, analogous to rebreathers for scuba diving.
- The most radical equipment adaptation for deep diving is to isolate the diver from the direct pressure of the environment, using armoured atmospheric diving suits that allow diving to depths beyond those currently possible at ambient pressure. These rigid, articulated exoskeleton suits are sealed against water and withstand external pressure while providing life support to the diver for several hours at an internal pressure of approximately normal surface atmospheric pressure. This avoids the problems of inert gas narcosis, decompression sickness, barotrauma, oxygen toxicity, high work of breathing, compression arthralgia, high-pressure nervous syndrome and hypothermia, but at the cost of reduced mobility and dexterity, logistical problems due to the bulk and mass of the suits, and high equipment costs.

=== Procedural adaptations for deeper diving ===
Procedural adaptations for deep diving can be classified as those procedures for operating specialized equipment, and those that apply directly to the problems caused by exposure to high ambient pressures.

- The most important procedure for dealing with physiological problems of breathing at high ambient pressures associated with deep diving is decompression. This is necessary to prevent inert gas bubble formation in the body tissues of the diver, which can cause severe injury. Decompression procedures have been derived for a large range of pressure exposures, using a large range of gas mixtures. These basically entail a slow and controlled reduction in pressure during ascent by using a restricted ascent rate and decompression stops, so that the inert gases dissolved in the tissues of the diver can be eliminated harmlessly during normal respiration.
- Gas management procedures are necessary to ensure that the diver has access to suitable and sufficient breathing gas at all times during the dive, both for the planned dive profile and for any reasonably foreseeable contingency. Scuba gas management is logistically more complex than surface supply, as the diver must either carry all the gas, must follow a route where previously arranged gas supply depots have been set up (stage cylinders). or must rely on a team of support divers who will provide additional gas at pre-arranged signals or points on the planned dive. On very deep scuba dives or on occasions where long decompression times are planned, it is a common practice for support divers to meet the primary team at decompression stops to check if they need assistance, and these support divers will often carry extra gas supplies in case of need.

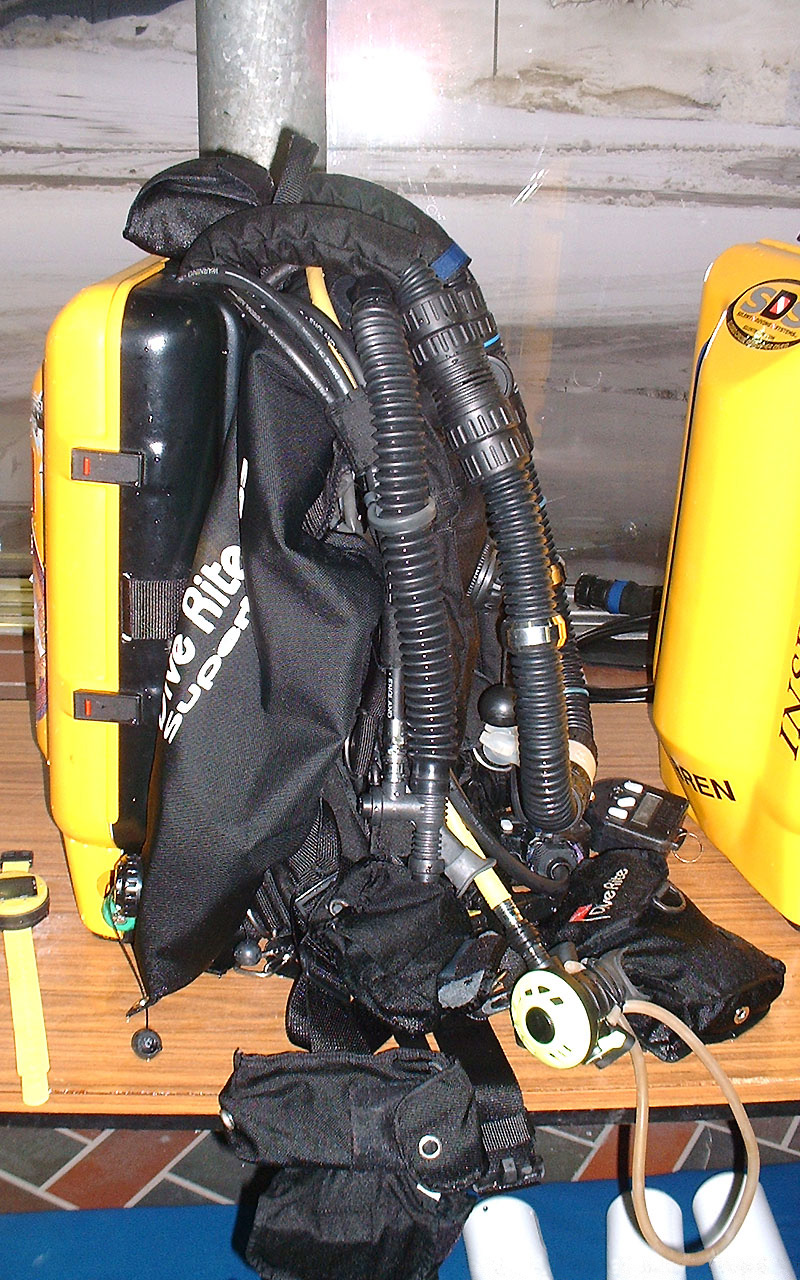
Closed circuit rebreather (AP Diving "Inspiration").

- Rebreather diving can reduce the bulk of the gas supplies for long and deep scuba dives, at the cost of more complex equipment with more potential failure modes, requiring more demanding procedures and higher procedural task loading.
- Surface supplied diving distributes the task loading between the divers and the support team, who remain in the relative safety and comfort of the surface control position. Gas supplies are limited only by what is available at the control position, and the diver only needs to carry sufficient bailout capacity to reach the nearest place of safety, which may be a diving bell or lockout submersible.
- Saturation diving is a procedure used to reduce the high-risk decompression a diver is exposed to during a long series of deep underwater exposures. By keeping the diver under high pressure for the whole job, and only decompressing at the end of several days to weeks of underwater work, a single decompression can be done at a slower rate without adding much overall time to the job. During the saturation period, the diver lives in a pressurized environment at the surface, and is transported under pressure to the underwater work site in a closed diving bell.

== Ultra-deep diving ==
=== Mixed gas ===
Amongst technical divers, there are divers who participate in ultra-deep diving on scuba below 200 metres (656 ft). This practice requires high levels of training, experience, discipline, fitness and surface support. Only twenty-six people are known to have ever dived to at least 240 metres (790 ft) on self-contained breathing apparatus recreationally. (Note: Statistics exclude military divers (classified), and commercial divers (commercial diving to those depths on scuba is not permitted by occupational health and safety legislation). In 1989, the US Navy Experimental Diving Unit published a paper that included a section on results from tests on the use of rebreathers at 850 ft (259 m).) (Note: In 2007 a Turkish Navy diver dived with a closed-circuit rebreather to a depth of 998 feet (304 m) off the coast of Cyprus, but that dive has not been independently verified. His dive was aborted due to equipment failure. It was a Turkish Navy experimental dive.) The "Holy Grail" of deep scuba diving was the 300 metres (980 ft) mark, first achieved by John Bennett in 2001, and has only been achieved five times since. Due to the short bottom times and long decompression, scuba dives to these depths are generally only done for deep cave exploration or as record attempts.

The difficulties involved in ultra-deep diving are numerous. Although commercial and military divers often operate at those depths, or even deeper, they are surface supplied. All of the complexities of ultra-deep diving are magnified by the requirement of the diver to carry (or provide for) their own gas underwater. These lead to rapid descents and "bounce dives". This has led to extremely high mortality rates amongst those who practice ultra-deep diving. Notable ultra-deep diving fatalities include Sheck Exley, John Bennett, Dave Shaw and Guy Garman. Mark Ellyatt, Don Shirley and Pascal Bernabé were involved in serious incidents and were fortunate to survive their dives. Despite the extremely high mortality rate, the Guinness World Records continues to maintain a record for scuba diving (although the record for deep diving with compressed air has not been updated since 1999, given the high accident rate). Amongst those who do survive significant health issues are reported. Mark Ellyatt is reported to have suffered permanent lung damage; Pascal Bernabé (who was injured on his dive when a light on his mask imploded) and Nuno Gomes reported short to medium term hearing loss.

Serious issues that confront divers engaging in ultra-deep diving on self-contained breathing apparatus include:

Compression arthralgia
Deep aching pain in the knees, shoulders, fingers, back, hips, neck, and ribs caused by exposure to high ambient pressure at a relatively high rate of descent (i.e., in "bounce dives").
High-pressure nervous syndrome (HPNS)
HPNS, brought on by breathing helium under extreme pressure causes tremors, myoclonic jerking, somnolence, EEG changes, visual disturbance, nausea, dizziness, and decreased mental performance. Symptoms of HPNS are exacerbated by rapid compression, a feature common to ultra-deep "bounce" dives.
Isobaric counterdiffusion (ICD)
ICD is the diffusion of one inert gas into body tissues while another inert gas is diffusing out. It is a complication that can occur during decompression, and that can result in the formation or growth of bubbles without changes in the environmental pressure.
Decompression algorithm
There are no reliable decompression algorithms tested for such depths on the assumption of an immediate surfacing. Almost all decompression methodology for such depths is based upon saturation, and calculates ascent times in days rather than hours. Accordingly, ultra-deep dives are almost always a partly experimental basis.

In addition, "ordinary" risks like size of gas reserves, hypothermia, dehydration and oxygen toxicity are compounded by extreme depth and exposure and long in-water decompression times. Some technical diving equipment is simply not designed for the greater pressures at these depths, and reports of key equipment (including submersible pressure gauges) imploding are not uncommon.

Verified scuba dives to at least 240 metres (787 ft)
Name	Location	T	A	Depth	Year
Bartłomiej Pitala (pl)	Matka Vrelo, Macedonia	C	CCR	338 m (1,109 ft)	2026
Ahmed Gabr	Dahab, Egypt	OW	OC	332 m (1,090 ft)	2014
Pascal Bernabé	Corsica, France	OW	OC	330 m (1,080 ft)	2005
Nuno Gomes	Dahab, Egypt	OW	OC	318 m (1,040 ft)	2005
Jarek Macedoński	Lake Garda, Italy	OW	CCR	316 m (1,040 ft)	2018
Mark Ellyatt	Phuket Island, Thailand	OW	OC	313 m (1,030 ft)	2003
Xavier Méniscus	Font Estramar, France	C	CCR	312 m (1,024 ft)	2024
John Bennett (Note: Subsequently died during diving accident.)	Puerto Galera, Philippines	OW	OC	308 m (1,010 ft)	2001
Frédéric Swierczynski	Font Estramar, France	C	CCR	308 m (1,010 ft)	2023
Krzysztof Starnawski	Lake Garda, Italy	OW	CCR	303 m (994 ft)	2018
Bartłomiej Pitala (pl)	Elefante Bianco, Italy	C	CCR	292 m (958 ft)	2026
Will Goodman	Gili Trawangan, Indonesia	OW	CCR	290 m (951 ft)	2014
Bartłomiej Pitala (pl)	Matka Vrelo, Macedonia	C	CCR	287 m (941 ft)	2025
Xavier Méniscus	Font Estramar, France	C	CCR	286 m (938 ft)	2019
Richard Harris	Boesmansgat, South Africa	C	CCR	284 m (932 ft)	2024
Nuno Gomes	Boesmansgat, South Africa	C	OC	283 m (928 ft)	1996
Krzysztof Starnawski	Dahab, Egypt	OW	CCR	283 m (928 ft)	2011
Jim Bowden	Zacatón, Mexico	C	OC	282 m (925 ft)	1994
Krzysztof Starnawski	Lake Viroit, Albania	C	CCR	278 m (912 ft)	2016
Han Ting	GuangXi, China	C	CCR	277 m (909 ft)	2023
Gilberto de Oliveira	Lagoa Misteriosa, Brazil	C	OC	274 m (899 ft)	2002
Richard Harris, Craig Challen	Boesmansgat, South Africa	C	CCR	272 m (892 ft)	2024
Nuno Gomes	Dahab, Egypt	OW	OC	271 m (889 ft)	2004
David Shaw	Boesmansgat, South Africa	C	DR	271 m (889 ft)	2004
Frédéric Swierczynski	Mescla, France	C	CCR	267 m (876 ft)	2016
Pascal Bernabé	Corsica, France	OW	OC	266 m (873 ft)	2005
Sheck Exley	Nacimiento del Mante, Mexico	C	OC	265 m (869 ft)	1989
Krzysztof Starnawski	Hranice Abyss, Czechia	C	CCR	265 m (869 ft)	2015
Sheck Exley	Zacatón, Mexico	C	OC	264 m (866 ft)	1989
Luca Pedrali	Lake Garda, Italy	OW	CCR	264 m (866 ft)	2017
Sheck Exley	Boesmansgat, South Africa	C	SCUBA	263 m (863 ft)	1993
Xavier Méniscus	Font Estramar, France	C	CCR	262 m (860 ft)	2015
Mark Ellyatt	Phuket Island (?), Thailand	OW	OC	260 m (853 ft)	2003
Qian Chen	Daxing Spring, China	C	CCR	258 m (846 ft)	2023
Bartłomiej Pitala (pl)	Sintzi Spring, Greece	C	CCR	255 m (836 ft)	2025
John Bennett	Puerto Galera, Philippines	OW	OC	254 m (833 ft)	2000
Michele Geraci	Bordighera, Italy	OW	OC	253 m (830 ft)	2014
Jordi Yherla	Font Estramar, France	C	CCR	253 m (830 ft)	2014
Nuno Gomes	Boesmansgat, South Africa	C	OC	252 m (827 ft)	1994
Don Shirley	Boesmansgat, South Africa	C	CCR	250 m (820 ft)	2005
Wacław Lejko	Lake Garda, Italy	OW	OC	249 m (817 ft)	2017
Xavier Méniscus	Font Estramar, France	C	CCR	248 m (814 ft)	2013
Karen van den Oever	Boesmansgat, South Africa	C	OC	246 m (807 ft)	2022
Xavier Méniscus	Goul de la Tannerie, France	C	CCR	246 m (807 ft)	2023
C.J. Brossett	Gulf of Mexico	OW	OC	245 m (804 ft)	2019
Richard Harris, Craig Challen	Pearse Resurgence, New Zealand	C	CCR	245 m (804 ft)	2020
Frédéric Swierczynski	Red Lake, Croatia	C	CCR	245 m (804 ft)	2017
Guy Garman	St. Croix, U.S. Virgin Islands	OW	OC	244 m (800 ft)	2015
Dariusz Wilamowski	Lake Garda, Italy	OW	OC	243 m (797 ft)	2012
Xavier Méniscus	Goul de la Tannerie, France	C	CCR	243 m (797 ft)	2019
Alexandre Fox	Goul de la Tannerie, France	C	CCR	242 m (794 ft)	2017
Jim Bowden	Zacatón, Mexico	C	OC	240 m (800 ft)	1993
Xavier Méniscus	Goul de la Tannerie, France	C	CCR	240 m (787 ft)	2014
Pascal Bernabé	Fontaine de Vaucluse, France	C	OC	240 m (787 ft)	1997

=== Deep Air Diving ===
A severe risk in Deep Air Diving is deep water blackout, or depth blackout, a loss of consciousness at depths below 50 metres (160 ft) with no clear primary cause, associated with nitrogen narcosis, a neurological impairment with anaesthetic effects caused by high partial pressure of nitrogen dissolved in nerve tissue, and possibly acute oxygen toxicity. The term is not in widespread use at present, as where the actual cause of blackout is known, a more specific term is preferred. The depth at which deep water blackout occurs is extremely variable and unpredictable. Before the popular availability of trimix, attempts were made to set world record depths using air. The extreme risk of both narcosis and oxygen toxicity in the divers contributed to a high fatality rate in those attempting records. In his book, Deep Diving, Bret Gilliam chronicles the various fatal attempts to set records as well as the smaller number of successes. From the comparatively few who survived extremely deep air dives:

Deep air dives
Depth (Note: As given in the references. Metre sea water and feet sea water, as well as metre/feet fresh water are actually units of pressure. A conversion to the true depth would require information about the water's density (dependent on temperature and – if applicable – salinity). Depth in metres and feet if measured by a shot line.)	Year	Name	Location	E	Comment
94 m (308 ft)	1947	Frédéric Dumas	Mediterranean Sea	OW	A member of the GRS (Groupement de Recherches Sous-marines, Underwater Research Group headed by Jacques Cousteau).
100 m (330 ft)	1957	Eduard Admetlla	Isla de Las Palomas	OW	Head of the Underwater Section of the «Submarine Research and Recovery Centre»
102 m (335 ft)	1969	Frank Salt	Chinhoyi Caves	C	
106 msw (345 fsw)	1988	Marty Dunwoody	Bimini	OW	Women's deep dive record
107 msw (350 fsw)	1961	Hal Watts	Florida	OW	
109 msw (355 fsw)	1961	Jean Clarke Samazen	Florida	OW	
110 msw (360 fsw)	1965	Tom Mount, Frank Martz	Florida	OW	
120 msw (390 fsw)	1965	Hal Watts, A.J. Muns	Florida	OW	
126 m (415 ft)	1970	Hal Watts	Mystery Sink	C	
131 m (430 ft)	1959	Ennio Falco, Alberto Novelli, Cesare Olgiai	Gulf of Naples	OW	Employing the Pirelli Explorer, "Maior" model, a two-stage regulator (patented by Novelli and Buggiani) equipped with a lung bag and soda lime filter for CO_{2} removal, in order to reuse the exhaled air. Only two of the three divers managed to reach the depth in a certified way: Novelli, the organizer of the event and inventor of the regulator, forgot to punch the plate for proving the descent.
134 msw (437 fsw)	1968	Neal Watson, John Gruener	Grand Bahama	OW	
135 msw (440 fsw)	1971	Ann Gunderson	Bahamas	OW	Women's deep dive record
139 msw (452 fsw)	1990	Bret Gilliam	Roatán	OW	Unusually, Gilliam remained largely functional at depth and was able to complete basic maths problems and answer simple questions written on a slate by his crew beforehand.
142 m (466 ft)	1971	Sheck Exley	Andros Island	OW	Exley was only supposed to go down to 91 m (299 ft) in his capacity as a safety diver (although he had practised several dives to 120 m (390 ft) in preparation), but descended to search for the dive team after they failed to return on schedule. Exley almost made it to the divers, but was forced to turn back due to heavy narcosis and nearly blacking out.
146 msw (475 fsw)	1993	Bret Gilliam	EL Salvador	OW	Again, Gilliam reported no effects from narcosis or oxygen toxicity.
150 msw (490 fsw)	1994	Dan Manion	Nassau	OW	155 msw (506 fsw) claimed, but not officially recognised. Manion reported he was almost completely incapacitated by narcosis and has no recollection of time at depth.
156 m (512 ft)	1999	Mark Andrews	Puerto Galera, Philippines	OW	At the maximum depth of 156.4 metres (513 ft) Andrews lost consciousness, his deep support diver John Bennett (on mixed gas), inflated his BC to initiate his ascent. While ascending he regained consciousness.
E Environment: OW = Open water, C = Cave

In deference to the high accident rate, the Guinness World Records have ceased to publish records for deep air dives, after Manion's dive.

== Risk ==
The risk of death in scuba depth record attempts is much greater than for surface-supplied diving to similar depths, where saturation divers do productive work at depths greater than scuba depth records The reasons are physiological and logistical. Deep surface-supplied diving is done using saturation mode, where the diver is compressed over a long period and can avoid or minimise inert gas narcosis, high-pressure nervous syndrome (HPNS), and compression arthralgia, and is decompressed from suturation in the relative comfort and safety of a diving chamber. The saturation diver is provided with an adequate and secure breathing gas supply, wears a diving helmet which protects the airways and is supported by a bellman. There is a range of opinions about the value of extreme exposure records, attempted intentionally, and the question may be asked whether the activity has any value beyond merely setting a new record.

=== Gas density and work of breathing ===
A high work of breathing means that the diver has correspondingly less reserve capacity to deal with an incident in which high exertion is necessary to rectify a problem, even for a short time. For example, a sudden loss of buoyancy may require the diver to fin upwards until the problem can be more efficiently managed. If this burst of exertion overwhelms the capacity to eliminate the carbon dioxide that it generates, the diver may be unable to avoid being overwhelmed by hypercapnia. Breathing gas can be optimised for low work of breathing by using higher helium fraction and minimum nitrogen, a small amount of which is needed to limit HPNS in the fast descents used by scuba divers to make gas logistics practicable, and keep the in-water decompression requirements manageable. Use of rebreathers can help with gas supply logistics, but inherently increases work of breathing as the gas is circulated through the scrubber by the breathing of the diver. Use of hydrogen in the mixture is experimental, and while it does improve work of breathing, and appears to reduce HPNS, it can only be used at considerable depth due to explosion risks, so the gas logistics are further complicated. Even less data is available on decompressing from exposures to mixtures containing hydrogen than trimix and heliox exposures.

=== Decompression schedules ===
Decompression schedules for bounce dive profiles to record depths are experimental and untested, and the decompression risk is basically unknown, and can only be estimated by extrapolation when using current decompression theory. Profiles and schedules used by record holders who survives the dive may be of some use, as they at least worked once, but no allowance is made for environmental and personal variables, the effects of which are in any case not quantifiable by any currently available decompression algorithm.

=== Narcosis and HPNS ===
The choice of gas mix for extreme depth on scuba is a compromise between density considerations, which call for minimising nitrogen, narcosis issues, which call for minimising nitrogen, and HPNS considerations, which require some nitrogen and limiting the rate of compression. If hydrogen is considered as an alternative, a possible explosion risk is balanced against less narcosis than nitrogen, lower density, possible reduction of HPNS, and an unknown effect on decompression.

=== Inner ear decompression sickness ===
IEDCS is known to occur during ascent after some deep dives, but the causes are uncertain. Inner ear decompression sickness is known to result from isobaric counterdiffusion, but the known triggering conditions do not occur with closed-circuit rebreathers. Nevertheless the symptoms of intense vertigo and nausea have occurred on both CCR and open circuit dives during ascent, which increase the risk of choking on aspired vomit, and drowning, and are likely to compromise decompression.

=== Gas logistics ===
A scuba diver must carry enough breathing gas to manage any single reasonably foreseeable incident and the expected consequences of that incident. There is a choice between the mechanical simplicity and reliability but large mass and volume, and the need for multiple gas switches of open circuit equipment, and the complexity and larger number of possible failure modes, and generally higher work of breathing of CCR, with its smaller mass and volume, and integral gas mixture control.

=== Psychological issues ===
- Risk denial
- Target fixation
- Dunning–Kruger effect
- Sunk cost

=== Statistics ===
- Number of successful depth record attempts:
- Number of non-fatal failed depth record attempts:
- Number of fatal depth record attempts:

=== Fatalities during depth record attempts ===
Diving activities are inherently risky, due to the underwater environment, and the diver manages risk by the appropriate use of equipment, using skills developed by learning, training and practice, along with suitable support by the members of a skilled and prepared team. Scuba diving forgoes some of the most relevant safety equipment and procedures to gain mobility and range, and it is inherently riskier than surface supplied diving for a number of reasons, most notably, the limit on gas supply that the diver can carry.

Attempts to break depth records push the physiological limits, and this reduces the margin for error to the extent the diver may not be able to recover from an incident that could be managed at shallower depths, and the psychological situation may induce a diver to ignore a developing problem until it is too late. Consequently, depth record attempts have a poor safety record, with a high fatality rate.

- Maurice Fargues, a member of the GRS (Groupement de Recherches Sous-marines, Underwater Research Group headed by Jacques Cousteau), died in 1947 after losing consciousness at depth in an experiment to see how deep a scuba diver could go. He reached 120 m (394 ft) before failing to return line signals. He became the first diver to die while using an Aqua-Lung.
- Hope Root died on 3 December 1953 off the coast of Miami Beach trying set a deep diving record of 125 m (410 ft) with an Aqua-Lung; he passed 152 m (500 ft) and was not seen again.
- Archie Forfar and Ann Gunderson died on 11 December 1971 off the coast of Andros Island, while attempting to dive to 146 m (479 ft), which would have been the world record at the time. Their third team member, Jim Lockwood, only survived due to his use of a safety weight that dropped when he lost consciousness at 122 m (400 ft), causing him to start an uncontrolled ascent before being intercepted by a safety diver at a depth of around 91 m (300 ft). Sheck Exley, who was acting as another safety diver at 300 feet, inadvertently managed to set the depth record when he descended towards Forfar and Gunderson, who were both still alive at the 480-foot level, although completely incapacitated by narcosis. Exley was forced to give up his attempt at around 142 m (465 ft) when the narcosis very nearly overcame him as well. The bodies of Forfar and Gunderson were never recovered.
- Sheck Exley died in 1994 at 268 m (879 ft) in an attempt to reach the bottom of Zacatón in a dive that would have extended his own world record (at the time) for deep diving.
- Dave Shaw died in 2005 in an attempt at the deepest ever body recovery and deepest ever dive on a rebreather at 270 m (886 ft).The incident was triggered by difficulties managing the body, which led to overexertion and irreversible hypercapnia due to high work of breathing, possibly aggravated by negative pressure breathing.
- Brigitte Lenoir, planning to attempt the deepest dive ever made by a woman with a rebreather to 230 m (750 ft), died on 14 May 2010 in Dahab while ascending from a training dive at 147 m (482 ft).
- Guy Garman died on 15 August 2015 in an unsuccessful attempt to dive to 370 m (1,200 ft). The Virgin Island Police Department confirmed that Guy Garman's body was recovered on 18 August 2015.
- Theodora Balabanova died at Toroneos Bay, Greece, in September 2017 attempting to break the women's deep dive record with 231 m (758 ft). She did not complete the decompression stops and surfaced too early.
- Wacław Lejko attempting 275 m (902 ft) in Lake Garda, died in September 2017. His body was recovered with an ROV at 230 m (750 ft).
- Adam Krzysztof Pawlik, attempting to break the deep-diving world record of 316 m (1,037 ft) by Jarek Macedoński in Lake Garda, died on 13 October 2018. His body was located at 284 m (932 ft).
- Sebastian Marczewski was attempting to break the deep-diving world record going below 333 m (1,093 ft) in Lake Garda. He died on 6 July 2019 at 150 m (490 ft).
- Han Ting, having renewed his own 234 m (768 ft) deepest Asian cave dive record to 277 m (909 ft) in April 2023 in Tianchuang, planned to set a world record for deepest cave dive there, aiming at 300 m (980 ft) on 12 October 2023. He failed to return from a preparatory dive on 7 October. His body was recovered by an ROV on 25 October 2023.

== See also ==
- Freediving – Underwater diving without breathing apparatus
- Open-water diving – Diving with access to breathable air of the atmosphere
- Cave diving – Diving in water-filled caves
- Breathing gas – Gas used for human respiration
  - Heliox – Breathing gas mixed from helium and oxygen
  - Trimix – Breathing gas consisting of oxygen, helium and nitrogen
  - Hydreliox – Breathing gas mixture of hydrogen, helium, and oxygen
  - Hydrox – Breathing gas mixture experimentally used for very deep diving
- Compression arthralgia – Joint pain caused by fast compression to high ambient pressure
- High-pressure nervous syndrome – Disorder from breathing helium based gas at high ambient pressure
- Oxygen toxicity – Toxic effects of breathing oxygen at high partial pressures
- Isobaric counterdiffusion – Gaseous diffusion through body tissue at constant total pressure
- Human physiology of underwater diving – Influences of the underwater environment on the physiology of human divers
