= FSW =

FSW may stand for:

- Fanhui Shi Weixing, a series of Chinese recoverable satellites
- Feet sea water, a unit of pressure
- Florida SouthWestern State College
- Free Speech Week, in the US
- Friction stir welding
- Forward-Swept Wing
