= Deon Dreyer =

South African diver (1974–1994)

Deon Dreyer (7 August 1974 – 17 December 1994) was a South African recreational scuba diver who died in Bushman's Hole in South Africa. Cave diver David Shaw died while retrieving Dreyer's body over 10 years later.

== Life ==
Dreyer's father, Theo (who owns a business that sells and services two-way radios) and mother, Marie, raised him in the town of Vereeniging, about 35 miles south of Johannesburg. Dreyer designed "obscenely loud car stereos", had a passion for diving, and loved adventure, (e.g., hunting, racing a souped-up car, and motorcycling).

Outside Magazine's Tim Zimmerman reports:

Deon had logged about 200 dives when he was invited to join some South Africa Cave Diving Association divers at Bushman's Hole over the 1994 Christmas break. They planned a descent to 150 metres (492 ft) and asked Deon to dive support. He was thrilled. Two weeks before the expedition, Deon's grandfather died. Sitting around a barbecue with his family one night, Deon spoke with boyish hubris. "He said if he had a choice of how to go out in life, he'd like to go out diving," recalls his father, Theo, 51.

== Death ==
Dreyer drowned on 17 December 1994, aged 20, during a practice dive. He was helping a team, assembled by Nuno Gomes, set up conditions for a deep technical dive scheduled to take place later that week. According to first-hand accounts from those diving with him, Dreyer was lost on ascent around 50 metres (160 ft) from the surface. They conjectured he had probably lost consciousness either because of oxygen toxicity or hypercapnia induced by the high work-rate of breathing at depth.

Two weeks after Dreyer's death, Theo hired a small, remotely operated sub used by the De Beers mining company. It found Dreyer's dive helmet on the sinkhole floor, but there was no sign of his body.

== Commemoration ==
Dreyer's parents erected a plaque on a rock wall above the Bushman's Hole entry pool, in memory of their son. In Phillip Finch's book Diving into Darkness: A True Story of Death and Survival, it was suggested that one of the reasons Dreyer's death created such an impression on the cave diving community was because of the plaque. The bodies of most other divers who die, even whilst cave diving, are recovered. However, for many years it was assumed Dreyer's body would never be recovered from the cave because it was simply too deep, but the plaque was a continual reminder to cave divers that his body lay within.

== Recovery of body ==
Ten years later, in October 2004, the Australian cave diver Dave Shaw discovered Dreyer's body in the cave at a depth of 272 metres (892 ft). On 8 January 2005, Shaw tried to recover the body but died in the attempt. Shaw's close friend and support diver, Don Shirley, nearly died and sustained permanent damage that impaired his balance. On 12 January 2005, while others were recovering Shaw's technical equipment, they discovered the bodies of both Dreyer and Shaw had floated up close to the surface. Both bodies were then recovered.

== See also ==
- Cave diving – Diving in water-filled caves
- Deep diving – Underwater diving to a depth beyond the norm
- Sheck Exley – American cave and deep diving pioneer and record breaker
- Nuno Gomes – South African diver and holder of scuba depth record
- Dave Shaw – Australian technical diver (1954–2005) (whilst retrieving Deon Dreyer's body)
- Technical diving – Diving beyond the scope of recreational diving
