= Compression arthralgia =

Joint pain caused by fast compression to high ambient pressure

Compression arthralgia is pain in the joints caused by exposure to high ambient pressure at a relatively high rate of compression, experienced by underwater divers. Also referred to in the U.S. Navy Diving Manual as compression pains.

Compression arthralgia has been recorded as deep aching pain in the knees, shoulders, fingers, back, hips, neck and ribs. Pain may be sudden and intense in onset and may be accompanied by a feeling of roughness in the joints.

Onset commonly occurs around 60 msw (meters of sea water), and symptoms are variable depending on depth, compression rate and personal susceptibility. Intensity increases with depth and may be aggravated by exercise. Compression arthralgia is generally a problem of deep diving, particularly deep saturation diving, where at sufficient depth even slow compression may produce symptoms. Peter B. Bennett et al. (1974) found that the use of trimix could reduce the symptoms.

Fast compression (descent) may produce symptoms as shallow as 30 msw. Saturation divers generally compress much more slowly, and symptoms are unlikely at less than around 90 msw. At depths beyond 180m even very slow compression may produce symptoms. Spontaneous improvement may occur over time at depth, but this is unpredictable, and pain may persist into decompression. Symptoms may be distinguished from decompression sickness as they are present before starting decompression, and resolve with decreasing pressure, the opposite of decompression sickness. The pain may be sufficiently severe to limit the diver's capacity for work, and may also limit travel rate and depth of downward excursions.

== Mechanism ==
The mechanism of compression arthralgia is not known.

== Treatment ==
The symptoms generally resolve during decompression and require no further treatment.
