= Pascal Bernabé =

French claimant to scuba diving depth record

Pascal Bernabé is a French scuba diver who in 2005 laid claim to the world best for depth on a deep dive using self-contained breathing apparatus. Bernabé claimed to have reached a maximum depth of 330 metres (1,080 ft) using trimix on 5 June 2005 near Propriano, Corsica. This was actually deeper than the official deepest scuba dive recognized by Guinness World Records at the time. That mark, set by Nuno Gomes in Dahab, Egypt, was 318.25 metres (1,044.1 ft) of sea water. However, Bernabé's claimed deepest dive was not included in the Guinness Book of World Records due to insufficient evidence of such a dive ever being performed.

On 18 September 2014, Ahmed Gabr descended to 332.35 metres (1,090.4 ft) in the Red Sea off the coast of Egypt, setting a new world record that superseded both Nuno's officially recognized record and Pascal's claimed record. Ahmed's record was verified by Guinness World Records.

== See also ==
- World's deepest SCUBA dives

== Sources ==
- Pascal Bernabé official site (French)
