= Tahitian Queen Bar =

The Tahitian Queen, often referred to as “TQs,” is an bar establishment situated on Beach Road, Pattaya, Thailand, It is widely recognized as the city’s oldest go-go bar.

== History ==
The Tahitian Queen opened in 1978 on Pattaya Beach Road. It was recognised as Pattaya’s first go-go bar and one of the longest-running bars in the city. Its establishment coincided with the rise of Pattaya’s nightlife, which began gaining prominence during the Vietnam War era when American GIs visited for rest and relaxation (R&R). The bar’s creation marked a significant moment in Pattaya’s transformation into a major nightlife destination.The Tahitian Queen has been under the same ownership for nearly 35 years. It had previously been was reported that the bar closed 29 December 2020 following COVID however it soon opened up and has remained open since

== Cultural Significance ==
The bar is known for its rock ‘n’ roll music and vibrant atmosphere. TQ is a hub for locals, expatriates, tourists, and groups like the Jesters Motorcycle Club, the Pattaya Hash House Harriers. The venue has also become popular with members of the local dive community having previously been frequented by renowned technical diver Mark Ellyatt and local dive group the Samaesan Bomb Hunters. It opens from 1 PM, making it a rare daytime go-go bar in Pattaya.
