= Dave Not Coming Back =

2020 film by Jonah Malak

- French: La dernière plongée de Dave
- Directed by: Jonah Malak
- Written by: Jonah Malak
- Produced by: Audrey-Ann Dupuis-Pierre; Jonah Malak
- Cinematography: Marwan Haroun; Hugo Gendron
- Edited by: Jonah Malak
- Music by: Marc Bell; Gabriel Thibaudeau
- Production company: Nemesis Films
- Distributed by: Fragments Distribution; Gravitas Ventures
- Release date: August 17, 2020
- Running time: 92 minutes
- Country: Canada
- Language: English

Dave Not Coming Back (French: La dernière plongée de Dave) is a Canadian documentary film, directed by Jonah Malak and released in 2020. The film centres on diver Dave Shaw's death while attempting to recover the body of Deon Dreyer from the submerged Boesmansgat cave in 2005, through a mix of camcorder footage from the incident and the personal reflections of his surviving friend Don Shirley.

== Synopsis ==
On October 28, 2004, two cave divers and long-time friends, Don Shirley and David Shaw, plan a dive at Boesmansgat. Dave reaches 270 meters, touching the bottom and exploring. He had just broken four records at once:

- Depth on a rebreather
- Depth in a cave on a rebreather
- Depth at altitude on a rebreather
- Depth running a line

While doing so, Dave discovered a body that had been lying there for nearly ten years. It was the body of the 20-year old diver Deon Dreyer.

Three months later, the two friends decide to come back and retrieve it. They call Deon Dreyer's parents and ask for their permission. They enroll eight support rebreather divers, all of whom were close to Don Shirley. Gordon Hiles, a cameraman from Cape Town, films throughout the process - from the preparation on the surface to the operation at the bottom of the cave. The surface marshal was Verna van Schaik, who then held the women's world record for depth. Dave did not survive the attempt to retrieve Dreyer's body.

== Production ==
Principal photography took place in 2017 and 2018, in Komati Springs and in Boesmansgat, South Africa, and in Melbourne, Australia.

=== Underwater filming ===
The production team joined effort with Don Shirley and shot all the underwater scenes on location. Half of the scenes were shot in Don's diving centre, the Komati Springs cave, a multilevel underwater mine, 180-meter deep, with many kilometres of galleries. The other half was shot in Boesmansgat, during Don's 2017 diving expedition. Because of the lack of communication underwater, the team would rehearse on the surface for long hours until they memorized the shots and the order in which they would be filmed.

== Reception ==
Dave Not Coming Back received the Audience Award at both Austin Film Festival and Hamilton Film Festival 2020. The film premiered on August 17, 2020, as part of the Adventure Film Series, a special summer edition of the Whistler Film Festival. It subsequently premiered commercially in Montreal, Quebec, on September 11, and was screened later the same month at the Sudbury Indie Cinema Co-op in Sudbury, Ontario, before being released commercially to streaming platforms in October 2020.

It was released theatrically in the fall of 2020, despite a semi-lockdown due to the COVID-19 pandemic. It was released online in the United States on November 10, 2020, and in Canada on December 15, 2020.

=== Awards and honors ===
Award	Year	Category	Recipient	Result	Ref.
Canadian Screen Award	2021	Best Editing in a Documentary	Jonah Malak	Nominated	
Canadian Cinema Editors	2021	Best Editing in Documentary Feature	Jonah Malak	Won	
Austin Film Festival	2020	Marquee Feature Audience Award	Audrey-Ann Dupuis Pierre, Jonah Malak	Won	
Hamilton Film Festival	2020	Best Documentary	Audrey-Ann Dupuis Pierre, Jonah Malak	Won	
