= Basic Cave Diving: A Blueprint for Survival =

Book on cave diving safety by Sheck Exley

- Fifth edition cover
- Author: Sheck Exley
- Subject: Cave diving
- Publisher: National Speleological Society – Cave Diving Section
- Publication date: 1979
- Publication place: United States
- Pages: 46

Basic Cave Diving: A Blueprint for Survival, also commonly referred to by the subtitle alone, A Blueprint for Survival, is a short book on safe scuba diving procedures for cave diving by pioneer cave diver Sheck Exley, originally published in 1979, by the Cave Diving Section of the National Speleological Society. It is considered to have had a significant impact on the number of cave diving fatalities since publication, and is considered one of the more historically important publications in recreational diving.

== Content ==
The book is in ten chapters, each based on the analysis of an accident report. The pdf version of the 5th edition has 46 pages.

- The foreword explains how Exley was inspired to write the book after viewing some state highway patrol accident report pictures, and realizing how effectively they brought him to understand the possible consequences of unsafe driving, and how he applied this approach to the structure of the book.
- Chapter 1: The Guideline – Line deployed by scuba divers for navigation
- Chapter 2: Air Supply Planning – Estimation of breathing gas mixtures and quantities required for a planned dive profile
- Chapter 3: Too Deep – Underwater diving to a depth beyond the norm
- Chapter 4: Panic – Sudden overwhelming sensation of fear
- Chapter 5: Lights – Light used underwater by a diver
- Chapter 6: Scuba – Self-contained underwater breathing apparatus
- Chapter 7: Silt – Reduction of underwater visibility by disturbing silt deposits
- Chapter 8: Emergency Procedures – Skills required to scuba-dive safely
- Chapter 9: Technological Emergencies – Agents and situations that pose a threat to the underwater diver
- Chapter 10: Physiological Emergencies – Agents and situations that pose a threat to the underwater diver

There are four appendices:

- A Blueprint for Survival – Ten Recommendations for Safe Cave Diving
- Certified Training Course Requirements: NSS Cave Diving Section
- NSS Cavern and Cave Diving Instructors
- In Case of Accident...

== Impact ==
A Blueprint for Survival was one of first manuals on cave diving safety, and was written at a time when cave diving fatalities were relatively frequent; despite this, the book is still considered relevant, as the basic principles of cave diving remain mostly unchanged.

== Editions ==
The work was first published in 1979, then again in 1980, 1981 and 1984. The fifth edition was published in 1986. It is available for free download from the NSSCDS.
