= Hranice Abyss =

Flooded sinkhole near the town of Hranice, Czech Republic

Coordinates: 49.532°N 17.750778°E

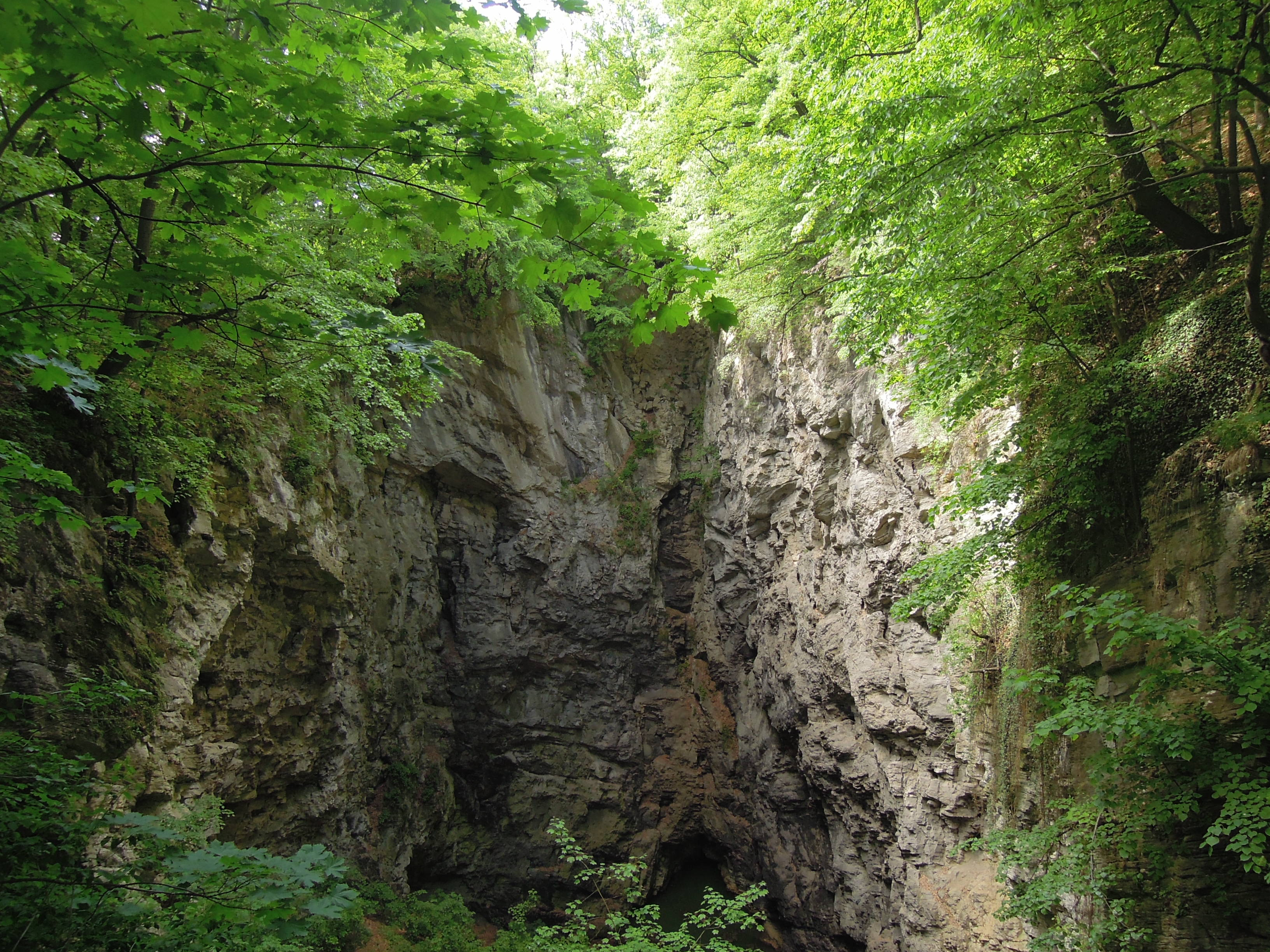
Hranice Abyss

Hranice Abyss (Czech: Hranická propast) is the deepest flooded pit cave in the world. It is a karst sinkhole near the town of Hranice, Czech Republic. In 2020 a scientific expedition revealed that the lowest reaches are sediment-filled and it was speculated that the sinkhole was formed by upwelling hot acidic water. The greatest confirmed depth is 519.5 m (1,704 ft), of which 450 m (1,476 ft) is underwater.

== Description ==
It is located near the Zbrašov Aragonite Caves, which are open to the public. The total depth of the sinkhole (at least 473.5 metres (1,553 ft)) is unknown, as the lower part of the abyss is flooded by the Hranice Lake. The sinkhole has an elliptical shape and is situated in the SE-SW direction. It is approximately 110 metres (360 ft) long at its longest point and 50 metres (160 ft) wide at its widest point. For most visitors the most interesting figure is the depth of the abyss including the flooded part, but in reality it is a rather rugged karst system. Karst phenomena (e.g. sinkholes) can also be observed in the immediate vicinity of the sinkhole.

At a depth of 48 metres (157 ft) below the surface of the lake, after crossing the siphon called Zubatice (after its jagged shape), it is possible to ascend to the dry caves (Rotunda Dry, Heaven I-III, Monika). These are continuously monitored, including water and air temperature measurements. In addition, the Dry Rotunda is known as a roosting site for bats, which enter it through a narrow passage from the Jezírka area. They have to cross about 7 metres (23 ft) of rock mass. The occurrence of bats is monitored and studied by experts from the Institute of Biology of the Academy of Sciences of the Czech Republic.

Below the Zubatice is narrow neck opening to the deep underwater cave called Lift. The bottom of the Lift in the depth of 219 metres (719 ft) is covered by sunken trees and branches making every further movement complicated and dangerous. The area is therefore called Mikado (a reference to the popular game). Behind this obstacle is the neck leading to another deep cave whose depth remains still uncertain.

== Depth ==
The dry part of the abyss is 69.5 metres (228 ft) deep. There is a small lake at the bottom.

The report of Jiří Pogoda states that he launched a specially designed probe (glider) from Zubatice to a total depth of 260 metres (850 ft) on 13 April 1980, during a solitary dive, without reaching the bottom. However, his measurements are incomplete and considered unreliable, as they have not been further verified. In terms of current knowledge, Pogoda's measurements are true, but due to the constriction at −205 metres (−673 ft), it would be highly improbable for his probe to sink lower and, more importantly, to be able to pull it back through a tangle of logs, branches and other obstacles at that level.

Below the surface, the abyss was mapped to a depth of −170 metres (−560 ft) (Pavel Říha, 2005), followed by a dive to a depth of −181 metres (−594 ft) (Krzysztof Starnawski, 2000) and a 21 June 2012 dive to a depth of −217 metres (−712 ft) (Starnawski with a team of six Czech and Polish divers). Robot (R.O.V.) Hyball was at a depth of −205 metres (−673 ft) (1995). The bottom was not reached because further investigations revealed a configuration of topography preventing further progress of the robot.

The measurement of the depth of the abyss was made on 1 October 2012, when Starnawski launched a probe from a depth of 217 metres (712 ft) to a depth of 373 metres (1,224 ft) during a caving action from the organization ZO ČSS 7-02 Hranický kras Olomouc. He then briefly descended to a depth of 225 metres (738 ft) himself, which is the deepest depth reached by a diver in this location.

On 12 October 2014, Starnawski again measured the new maximum depth of the submerged part of the Hranice Abyss – 384 metres (1,260 ft). On 27 September 2016, the ROV made by GRALmarine reached a depth of 404 metres (1,325 ft) without reaching the bottom. This surpassed the depth of Italy's Pozzo del Merro, which until then had been considered the deepest submerged chasm in the world with a maximum measured depth of 392 metres (1,286 ft). In 2022 UNEXMIN Georobotics reached 450 metres (1,480 ft) water depth with the UX1-Neo robot and set the new world record. The total confirmed depth in 2022 was 519.5 metres (1,704 ft) – 69.5 metres (228 ft) above water, and 450 metres (1,480 ft) below. The depth of the abyss was inferred to be 800–1,000 metres (2,600–3,300 ft), as indicated by electrical resistivity tomography, gravity, deep‐reaching audiomagnetotellurics, seismic, and radiochemical methods. Further, the previously assumed hypogenic origin (like Zacatón and Pozzo del Merro) was considered unlikely.
