= Guy Garman =

Scuba diver who died in a world record attempt

Guy "Rusty" Garman, sometimes known as Doc Deep, was a physician and scuba diver who died during an attempt to set a world record recreational deep dive on 15 August 2015, aged 56.

== Background ==
Guy Garman was born to Nazarene Missionaries Larry and Addie Garman and grew up in the Amazon jungles of Peru with the Aguaruna natives. He went to boarding school in Pucallpa, Peru and Quito, Ecuador before heading on to Point Loma Nazarene University for College.

Garman was a Doctor of Osteopathic Medicine with a focus in otolaryngology – ear, nose and throat care, as well as head, neck and facial plastic surgery. He maintained a private practice in Maryville, Tennessee for about 13 years, along with his nurse Jennifer Ingram, and was additionally a clinical professor of otolaryngology at Lincoln Memorial University's Debusk College of Osteopathic Medicine, before he relocated to St. Croix, U.S. Virgin Islands, in 2010. In St. Croix he opened an ear, nose and throat practice.

== Dive ==
In August 2015, Garman tried to set a record for a recreational scuba dive of 1,200 feet (370 m). His wife and son were present at the dive site. The dive took place off the Saint Croix coast. Garman had arranged for a 1,300 feet (400 m) weighted line to be anchored in place as part of the dive. Garman was supported by dive operator the Scuba Tec dive team, of St. Croix Ultimate Bluewater Adventures, in the attempt. He had a total support team of 28 people, including his oldest son, Kip Garman.

He began the dive at 6am as scheduled. Initial descent to 200 metres (660 ft) with members of his support team went as planned. From there, he was to get to the bottom, solo, and return to an air station at a depth of 350 feet (110 m) within an estimated 38 minutes. From there he would make a slow ascent. However, he did not reach the rendezvous point.

== Aftermath ==
In a statement released to the media, his wife said that his body and equipment were recovered from the water Tuesday morning (18 August), and that the Medical Examiner has ruled his death a drowning.

== See also ==
- World's deepest scuba dives
