= Jonah Malak =

Canadian documentary filmmaker

- Born: Karim Haroun
- Occupations: Director; Producer; Editor
- Years active: 2014 – present
- Website: https://vimeo.com/showcase/jonahmalak

Jonah Malak, also known as Karim Haroun, is a Canadian documentary filmmaker, producer and editor from Montreal, Quebec. He is most noted for Dave Not Coming Back and Spare My Bones, Coyote!

== Early life and education ==
Jonah Malak was born in Beirut, Lebanon, during the Lebanese Civil War. After completing his Bachelor in Mathematics at the American University of Beirut, he moved to Montreal, Canada where he completed a double Bachelor in Arts in Film Studies and in Film Production.

He was a founding partner of the Canadian production company Nemesis Films with Pascal Plante and Dominique Dussault (producer).

== Career ==
Since founding Nemesis Films, Jonah Malak directed exclusively documentary films : Mystic Mass (Masse mystique), My Tuesdays at Catherine's (Mes mardis chez Catherine), and Dave Not Coming Back.

He had previously directed two short-films, June and Chronicles of Hyperinflation.

Malak is also a published writer, and his publications include Le Conte de la maison bête and Les Morts d'Omar.

== Filmography ==
Year	Title	Credit	Festivals / Awards
2014	Mystic Mass	Director; Editor; Producer	Visions du Réel, Official Selection; RIDM, Official Selection
2018	My Tuesdays At Catherine’s	Director; Editor; Producer	
2020	Dave Not Coming Back	Director; Editor; Producer	Nomination: Canadian Screen Award, Best Editing in a Documentary; Winner: Canadian Cinema Editors, Best editing in a Feature documentary Winner: Austin Film Festival, Audience Award; Winner: Hamilton Film Festival, Best Documentary
2023	Red Rooms	Editor	Nomination: Gala Québec Cinéma, Prix Iris for Best Editing
2025	Spare My Bones, Coyote!	Director; Editor; Producer	Nominations: Canadian Screen Award; Canadian Screen Award for Best Feature Length Documentary; Canadian Screen Award for Best Original Music in a Documentary; Canadian Screen Award for Best Sound Design in a Documentary; Winner: DocsMxl, Best International Documentary
