= Sheck Exley =

American cave and deep diving pioneer and record breaker

- Born: April 1, 1949
- Died: April 6, 1994 (aged 45); Zacatón, Tamaulipas, Mexico
- Occupation: Automobile dealer / high school math teacher
- Known for: Cave diving pioneer
- Notable work: Basic Cave Diving: A Blueprint for Survival

Sheck Exley (April 1, 1949 – April 6, 1994) was an American cave diver. He is widely regarded as one of the pioneers of cave diving, and he wrote two major books on the subject: Basic Cave Diving: A Blueprint for Survival and Caverns Measureless to Man. On February 6, 1974, Exley became the first chairman of the Cave Diving Section of the American National Speleological Society. During his career, he established many of the basic safety procedures used in cave and overhead diving today. Exley was also a pioneer of extreme deep scuba diving.

For purposes of rescue during cave diving, Exley helped standardize the usage of the "octopus", a redundant second stage diving regulator that can be used as a backup in the event the diver's primary second stage fails, or alternatively, to allow the diver and their buddy to have simultaneous access to the diver's gas if the buddy has an out-of-gas emergency. The octopus is now considered an essential piece of equipment among virtually all scuba divers, whether caving or in open water.

Exley died at age 45 while trying to set a depth record by diving the world's deepest sinkhole, Mexico's 1,080-foot (330 m) deep Zacatón, a fresh water cenote.

In the book, Diving into Darkness (a story about Dave Shaw and Don Shirley), the author comments: "Exley's status in the sport is almost impossible to overstate".

== Early life and career outside of diving ==
Exley began diving in 1965 at the age of 16. That same year he entered his first cave and was hooked on cave diving for the rest of his life. To finance this passion, Exley worked as a mathematics teacher at Suwannee High School in Live Oak, Florida.

In spring 1973, Exley served as an aquanaut during an eight-day mission aboard the Hydrolab underwater habitat in the Bahamas.

== Records ==
Exley was the first man in the world to log over 1,000 cave dives (at the age of 23); in 29 years of cave diving, he made over 4000 dives.

Exley had an unusual resistance to nitrogen narcosis, and was one of the few divers to survive a 400-foot (120 m) open-water dive on simple compressed air. In acting as a safety diver for two divers trying to set an air-only depth record in 1970, Exley reached 465 feet (142 m) in salt water, but could go no deeper due to narcosis and the start of blackout (the two record-depth attempting unconscious divers died just out of reach beneath him, and such air-depth records are no longer sought or recorded). During his diving career, he set numerous depth and cave penetration records.

Exley was the first person in the history of technical SCUBA diving to dive below 800 feet (240 m). His carefully planned multistage decompressions from these dives, in open water (not in a decompression tank), sometimes required times of as much as 13.5 hours. However, he never suffered a classic case of decompression sickness in his career.

Exley and German cave diver Jochen Hasenmayer became friends and rivals in the 1980s, each repeatedly attempting to break the depth records of the other.

== Death ==
Exley died, aged 45, on April 6, 1994, while attempting to descend to a depth of over 1,000 feet (300 m) in a freshwater cenote, or sinkhole, called Zacatón in the state of Tamaulipas, Mexico. He made the dive as part of a dual dive with Jim Bowden, but Bowden aborted his descent early when his gas supply ran low. Exley's body was recovered when his support crew hauled up his unused decompression tanks. It was found that he had looped into the descent line, perhaps to sort out gas issues. His wrist-mounted dive computer read a maximum depth of 906 feet (276 m).

The cause of Exley's death could not be determined. Team members concluded the causes "...could include stress of HPNS exacerbated by the narcotic effects of nitrogen at that depth". The line was also wrapped (deliberately) around Exley's tank valves. Bowden and other experts have theorized that Exley might have done this in anticipation of his own death to prevent any dangerous body recovery operations.

The remipede L. exleyi, discovered by Australian cave divers Andrew Poole and Dave Warren in August 1993, was named in honor of Sheck Exley.

The Sheck Exley Award is given by the National Speleological Society - Cave Diving Section for 1000 safe cave dives post full cave training.

== Books ==
- Mapping Underwater Caves. National Association for Cave Diving. 1973., coauthored with Bob Friedman
- Basic Cave Diving: A Blueprint for Survival. Cave Diving Section of the National Speleological Society. 1979.
- Caverns Measureless to Man. Cave Books. 1994. ISBN 0939748258.
- The Taming of the Slough: A Comprehensive History of Peacock Springs. National Speleological Society. 2004. ISBN 1879961199.
