= U.S. Navy Diving Manual =

Training and operations handbook

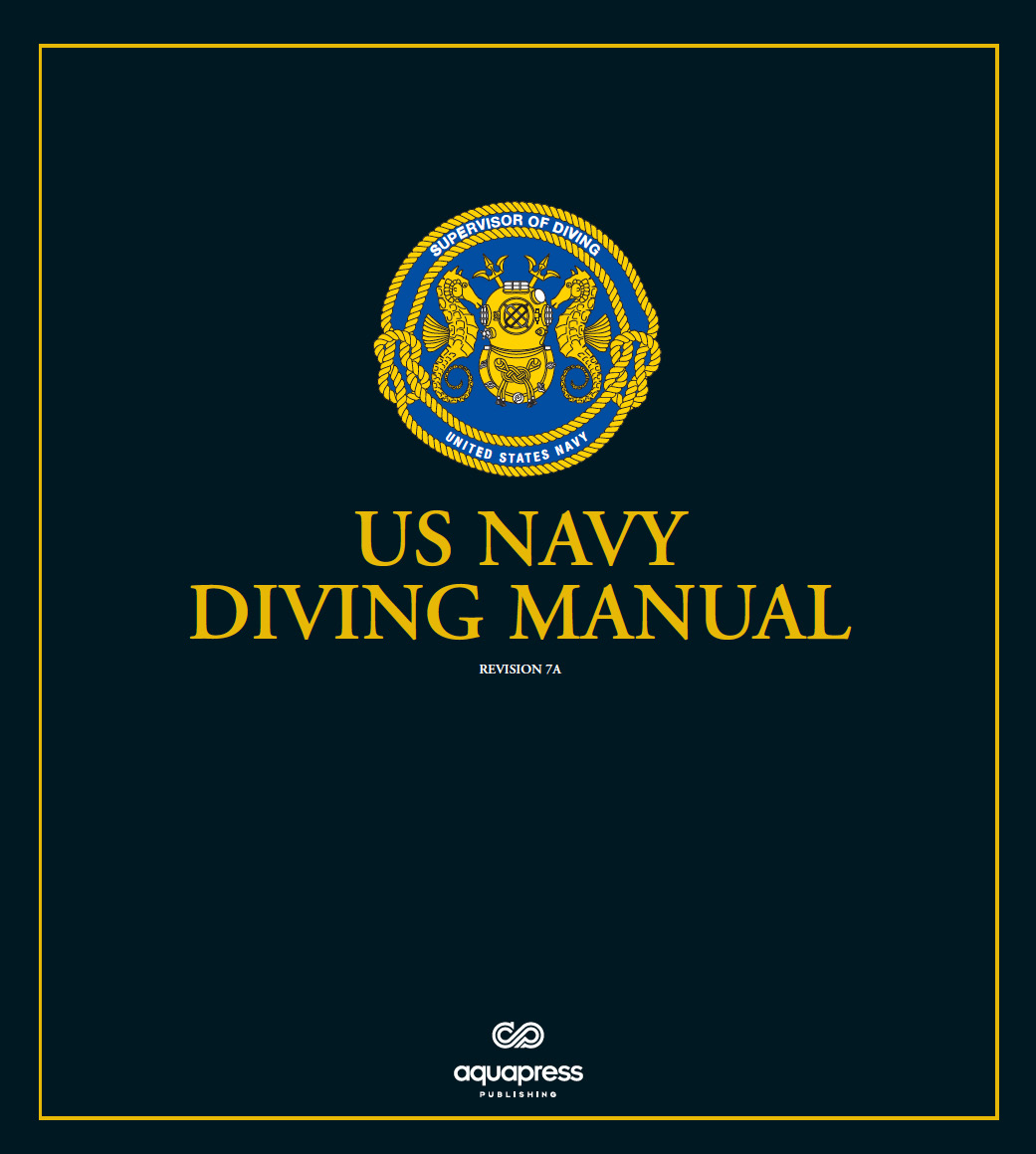
- US Navy Diving Manual Revision 7A Looseleaf
- Language: English
- Release number: Revision 7, Change A
- Subject: Diving theory, equipment, and operations
- Genre: Non-fiction
- Publication date: 1905 to 2018
- Publication place: United States
- Website: www.navsea.navy.mil/Home/SUPSALV/00C3-Diving/Diving-Publications/

The U.S. Navy Diving Manual is a book used by the US Navy for diver training and diving operations.

== Overview ==
The US Navy first provided a diving manual for training and operational guidance in 1905, and the first book titled Diving Manual was published in 1916. Since then books titled Diving Manual or U.S. Navy Diving Manual have been published several times, each one updating the content of the previous version. The amount of information provided has tended to increase over the years, the 1905 edition had approximately 66 pages, while Revision 7 (2016) has 992 pages in 18 chapters; the manuals are illustrated with contemporary photographs, diagrams and graphs.

== Content ==
Content has varied in the various editions, and the order and layout have changed over the years. It remains one of the most comprehensive textbooks on the theory and practice of diving generally available. Some content type is common to all editions, but has been updated and expanded to keep it current and relevant, and some content has been added as the equipment, theory and field of operations changed over the more than a century of the manual's existence.

=== Content of Revision 7 ===
Revision 7 (2016) has the following content:

- Volume 1: Diving Principles and Policies
  - Chapter 1: History of diving: Surface-supplied air diving, scuba diving, mixed gas diving, submarine salvage and rescue, salvage diving, open sea deep diving records.
  - Chapter 2: Underwater physics: Physics, matter, measurement, energy, light energy in diving, mechanical energy in diving, heat energy in diving, pressure in diving, gases in diving, gas laws, gas mixtures.
  - Chapter 3: Underwater Physiology and Diving Disorders: The nervous system, the circulatory system, the respiratory system, respiratory problems in diving, barotrauma during descent, barotrauma during ascent, pulmonary overinflation syndromes, indirect effects of pressure on the human body, thermal problems in diving, special medical problems associated with deep diving, other diving medical problems.
  - Chapter 4: Dive Systems: General information, diver's breathing gas purity standards, diver's air sampling program, dive system components
  - Chapter 5: Dive Program Administration:
  - Appendix 1A: Safe Diving Distances from Transmitting Sonar
  - Appendix 1B: References
  - Appendix 1C: Telephone Numbers
  - Appendix 1D: List of Acronyms
- Volume 2: Air Diving Operations
  - Chapter 6: Operational Planning and Risk Management: Mission analysis, course of action development, risk assessment, task planning and emergency assistance, execution.
  - Chapter 7: SCUBA Air Diving Operations: Operational considerations, minimum equipment, operational equipment, air supply, pre-dive procedures, water entry and exit, underwater procedures, ascent procedures, post-dive procedures.
  - Chapter 8: Surface Supplied Air Diving Operations: KM-37 NS, Mk 20, portable surface-supplied diving systems, surface-supplied diving accessory equipment, diving communications, pre-dive procedures, water entry and descent, underwater procedures, ascent procedures, surface decompression, post-dive procedures.
  - Chapter 9: Air Decompression: Theory of decompression, definitions, dive charting and recording, the air decompression tables, general rules for the use of air decompression tables, no decompression limits and repetitive group designation, the air decompression table, repetitive dives, exceptional exposure dives, variations in rate of ascent, emergency procedures, diving at altitude, ascent to altitude/flying after diving, dive computer
  - Chapter 10: Nitrogen-Oxygen Diving Operations: Equivalent air depth, oxygen toxicity, nitrox diving procedures, nitrox repetitive diving, nitrox dive charting, fleet training for nitrox, nitrox diving equipment, equipment cleanliness, breathing gas purity, nitrox mixing, blending and storage systems.
  - Chapter 11: Ice and Cold Water Diving Operations: Operations planning, pre-dive procedures, operating precautions, emergency procedures.
  - Appendix 2A: Optional Shallow Water Diving Tables
  - Appendix 2B: U.S. Navy Dive Computer
  - Appendix 2C: Environmental and Operational Hazards:
  - Appendix 2D: Guidance for U.S. Navy Diving on a Dynamic Positioning Vessel
- Volume 3: Mixed Gas Surface Supplied Diving Operations
  - Chapter 12: Surface-Supplied Mixed Gas Diving: Operational considerations, diving equipment/systems, descent and ascent procedures, emergency procedures, charting heliox dives, diving at altitude.
  - Chapter 13: Saturation Diving: Deep diving systems, US Navy fly-away saturation dive system, shore based saturation facilities, life support systems, thermal protection system, underwater breathing apparatus, gas usage, operations, operational considerations, selection of storage depth, records, logistics DDC and PTC atmosphere control, gas supply requirements, environmental control, fire zone considerations, hygiene, atmosphere quality control, compression phase, storage depth, emergency procedures, decompression, post-dive procedures.
  - Chapter 14: Breathing Gas Mixing Procedures: Mixing procedures, gas analysis.
- Volume 4: Closed-Circuit and Semiclosed Circuit Diving Operations
  - Chapter 15: Electronically Controlled Closed-Circuit Underwater Breathing Apparatus (EC-UBA) Diving: Principles of operation, operational planning, pre-dive procedures, descent, underwater procedures, ascent procedures, decompression procedures, multi-day diving, altitude diving and flying after diving, post-dive procedures, medical aspects, equipment reference data.
  - Chapter 16: Closed Circuit Oxygen UBA (CC-UBA) Diving: Medical aspects of closed-circuit oxygen diving, oxygen exposure limits, operations planning, pre-dive procedures, water entry and descent, underwater procedures, ascent procedures, post-dive procedures and documentation, Mk-25.
- Volume 5: Diving Medicine and Recompression Chamber Operations
  - Chapter 17: Diagnosis and Treatment of Decompression Sickness and Arterial Gas Embolism: Manning requirements, arterial gas embolism, decompression sickness, recompression treatment, treatment tables, treatment for non-diving disorders, chamber life-support considerations, post treatment considerations, non-standard treatments, treatment abort procedures, ancillary care and adjunctive treatments, emergency medical equipment,
  - Chapter 18: Recompression Chamber Operation: Description, state of readiness, gas supply, operation, maintenance, diver candidate pressure test.
  - Appendix 5A: Neurological Examination
  - Appendix 5B: First Aid
  - Appendix 5C: Hazardous Marine Creatures
- Index

== Format ==
Varies with edition. Early editions were available in hard or soft binding. Recent editions have been casebound, looseleaf and pdf for download or on compact disc.

== Impact ==
Before the establishment of recreational diver certification, the U.S. Navy Diving Manual was used as the training manual for recreational divers in the US, and was frequently referenced in other English speaking countries. It was also used as training material for commercial divers, and has been the standard text for the U.S.Navy for diver training.

US Navy decompression tables and variations on the originals have been used worldwide by recreational and professional divers. This trend has decreased somewhat with the availability of economical and acceptably reliable decompression computers. One issue for recreational use was that the Navy decompression tables were considered relatively high risk for decompression sickness when followed to the limit. For divers without convenient recourse to a decompression chamber, this was considered an unacceptable risk, and various modifications to the tables were made for greater conservatism and convenience of use. Even after the recreational diving industry published a variety of training manuals, the U.S.Navy Diving manual remains a respected and widely used reference by recreational technical and professional divers worldwide. This may be partly due to the ease of access, as the later versions have been freely available for download as pdf files.

== Editions and revisions ==
- 1905 - Manual for Divers - Handbook for Seaman Gunners, published by the Naval Torpedo Station, printed in Washington, DC. The book had seven chapters: Requirement of divers; Description of Diving Apparatus; Accidents That May Happen; Rules for Resuscitation; Signals; Duties of the Person in Charge of the Diver and of the Divers Tenders and Assistants; Preparation and Operation of Apparatus; Method of Instruction; Care and Preservation of Apparatus; Diving Outfit; Pressure at Different Depths.
- 1916 - Diving Manual 1916, published by the Navy Department, Washington Government Printing Office. Intended for use as an instruction manual as well as for general use.
- 1924 - U.S. Navy Diving Manual – a reprint of Chapter 36 of the Manual of the Bureau of Construction & Repair, Navy Department, which was responsible for US Navy Diving research and development at the time.
- 1943 - Diving Manual 1943, published by the Navy Department, Bureau of Ships, to supersede the 1924 manual, printed by United States Government Printing Office, Washington, DC. The book has 21 chapters on all aspects of US Navy diving at the time, including diving on Heliox mixtures, which was a new development. The main focus was on the US Navy Mk V helmet, a typical free-flow copper helmet used with standard diving dress, but shallow water diving equipment is also covered.
- 1952 - Diving Manual, document identity NAVSHIPS 250–880, also published by the Navy Department, Bureau of Ships, to supersede the 1943 manual. It has nine parts: History and Development of Diving, Basic Principles of Diving, Diving Equipment, Diving Procedures, Medical Aspects of Diving, Diving with Helium-Oxygen Mixtures, Summary of Safety Precautions, Diving Accidents, and Component Parts of Standard Diving Equipment.
- 1959 - U. S. Navy Diving Manual, document NAVSHIPS 250–538, published by the Navy Department, Bureau of Ships to supersede the 1952 manual. This manual is in four parts: General Principles of Diving, Surface Supplied Diving, Self Contained Diving, and Diving Accessories.
- 1963 - U.S. Navy Diving Manual, document NAVSHIPS 250–538, published by the Navy Department, Bureau of Ships. In three parts: General Principles of Diving, Surface Supplied Diving, which refers to standard dress diving, including the use of Helium-Oxygen mixtures, and Self Contained Diving.
- 1970 - US Navy Diving Manual, document NAVSHIPS 0994-001-9010, published by the Navy Department, Washington DC 20350 to supersede the 1963 manual. In three parts and 6 appendices. Extensively illustrated with photographs, diagrams and tables, and approved for public sale. Part 1. General principles of diving, Part 2: Surface supplied diving, Part 3: Self contained diving. The appendices were: A: first Aid and Emergency Procedures, B: Technical information, gas mixing, gas analysis and high pressure systems, C: Technical information on surface demand diving, D: Scuba technical manuals and information, E: Marine life, F: Selection, qualification and training personnel.
- 1973 - US Navy Diving Manual, document NAVSHIPS 0994-001-9010, published by the U.S.Government Printing Office, Washington DC, in two volumes: Volume 1: Air Diving, in a 3-ring binder, and Volume 2, Mixed Gas Diving, in a smaller book.
- 1975 - US Navy Diving Manual, published by Naval Sea Systems Command, Navy Department, Washington DC, in two volumes. Part 1: Air Diving, document NAVSEA 0994-LP-001-9010, and Part 2: Mixed-Gas Diving, document NAVSHIPS 0994-001-9010. This revision was published following comments and recommendations for change in the year following the 1973 edition, and to include some changes in diving technology. It also followed consolidation of Naval Ship Systems Command and the Naval Ordnance Systems Command to form the Naval Sea Systems Command, hence the NAVSEA designation. The work comprises 21 sections, on history of diving, underwater physics, underwater physiology, operations planning, scuba diving air, surface supply diving air, air decompression, diving emergencies, mixed gas theory, operations planning, underwater breathing apparatus, surface supply diving mixed gas, deep diving systems, oxygen diving operations, surface supply decompression, mixed gas scuba decompression, and helium oxygen saturation diving. Each volume also has appendices and an index.
- 1981 - U.S. Navy Diving Manual, Volume 2, Mixed Gas Diving. NAVSEA 0994-LP001-9010 Revision 1, Navy Department, Washington DC. Chapters 9 through 17 and appendices A through D. dated July 1, 1981.
- 1985 - US Navy Diving Manual, Volume 1, Air Diving, Revision 1, document NAVSEA 0994-LP-001-9010, dated 1 June 1985.
- 1987 - US Navy Diving Manual, Volume 2, Mixed-Gas Diving, Revision 2, dated 1 October 1987. Document NAVSEA 0994-001-9020.
- 1988 - US Navy Diving Manual, Volume 1, Air Diving, Revision 2, dated 15 December 1988.
- 1991 and 1993 – US Navy Diving Manual (vols 1&2) Revision 3, published by USN Sea Systems Command:
  - Vol 1 : Air Diving, 1993, and changes in July 1996. Contents: History of Diving, Underwater Physics, Underwater Physiology, Operations Planning, SCUBA air diving operations, Surface-supplied air diving operations, Air decompression, Diving Medicine.
  - Vol 2: Mixed gas diving, 1991 and 3 changes by 1996. Contents: History of mixed gas diving, Mixed gas and oxygen diving operations planning, Surface-supplied mixed gas diving operations, Saturation diving, Closed circuit oxygen UBA.
- 1999 - U.S. Navy Diving Manual, Revision 4, document NAVSEA 0910-LP-708-8001 dated 20 January 1999. Five volumes. Change A issued March 2001. Also published by Claitors Pub Div; in a five-volume set edition, volumes titled: 1: Diving principles and policies, 2: Air diving operations, 3: Mixed-gas surface-supplied diving operations, 4: Closed-circuit and Semiclosed-circuit diving operations, 5: Diving medicine and recompression chamber operations. ISBN 978-1579804541.
- 2005 - U.S. Navy Diving Manual, Revision 5, document NAVSEA SS521-AG-PRO-010, dated 15 August 2005. Formally incorporates operational risk management processes. In 5 volumes titled as Revision 5.
- 2008 - U.S. Navy Diving Manual, Revision 6, dated April 2008, includes the Thalmann algorithm air decompression table. In 5 volumes titled as Revision 6 Published by Direction of Commander, Naval Sea Systems Command, and produced on CD ROM by Best Publishing Company.
- 2011 – U.S. Navy Diving Manual, Revision 6, Change A, dated 15 October 2011.
- 2017 - U.S. Navy Diving Manual, Revision 7, document NAVSEA 0910-LP-115-1921, dated 1 December 2016, supersedes SS521-AG-PRO-010, Revision 6, Change A, dated 15 October 2011. In 5 volumes titled as Revision 6. U.S. Government Printing Office, Washington, D.C.
- 2018 – U.S. Navy Diving Manual, Revision 7, Change A, dated 30 April 2018.
