= Spare My Bones, Coyote! =

- French: Mais où va-t-on, coyote?
- Directed by: Jonah Malak
- Written by: Jonah Malak
- Produced by: Dominique Dussault
- Starring: Ely Ortiz; Marisela Ortiz; Aguilas del Desierto
- Cinematography: Nicolas Taborga
- Edited by: Marie-Pier Dupuis; Jonah Malak; Gisela Restrepo
- Music by: Marc Bell
- Production company: Nemesis Films
- Release date: April 27, 2025 (Hot Docs)
- Running time: 84 minutes
- Country: Canada

Spare My Bones, Coyote! (French: Mais où va-t-on, coyote?) is a Canadian documentary film written and directed by Jonah Malak, following the daily lives of the volunteer group Águilas del Desierto.

The film released in theatres in Quebec on January 9, 2026.

== Synopsis ==
Over the past twelve years, Marisela and Ely have wandered through the US-Mexican desert. Their goal: to search for, recover, and return the bodies of migrants who died while crossing on foot to their families. This takes a heavy toll on them, but they nonetheless pursue their mission. Spare My Bones, Coyote! follows their work, their dedication, and the difficult lives they have chosen to lead.

== Distribution ==
The film premiered at the Hot Docs Canadian International Documentary Festival in Toronto on April 27, 2025. The film was also selected for other festivals such as the DOXA Documentary Film Festival in Vancouver and the Shanghai International Film Festival in China.

The film won the Jury Award at DocsMX in Mexico and the Magus-Isacsson Award at Montreal International Documentary Festival (RIDM).

The film received a Canadian Screen Award nomination for Best Feature Length Documentary at the 14th Canadian Screen Awards in 2026. Marc Bell was also nominated for Best Original Music in a Documentary, and Sylvain Brassard was nominated for Best Sound Design in a Documentary.
