= Krzysztof Starnawski =

Polish technical and cave diver

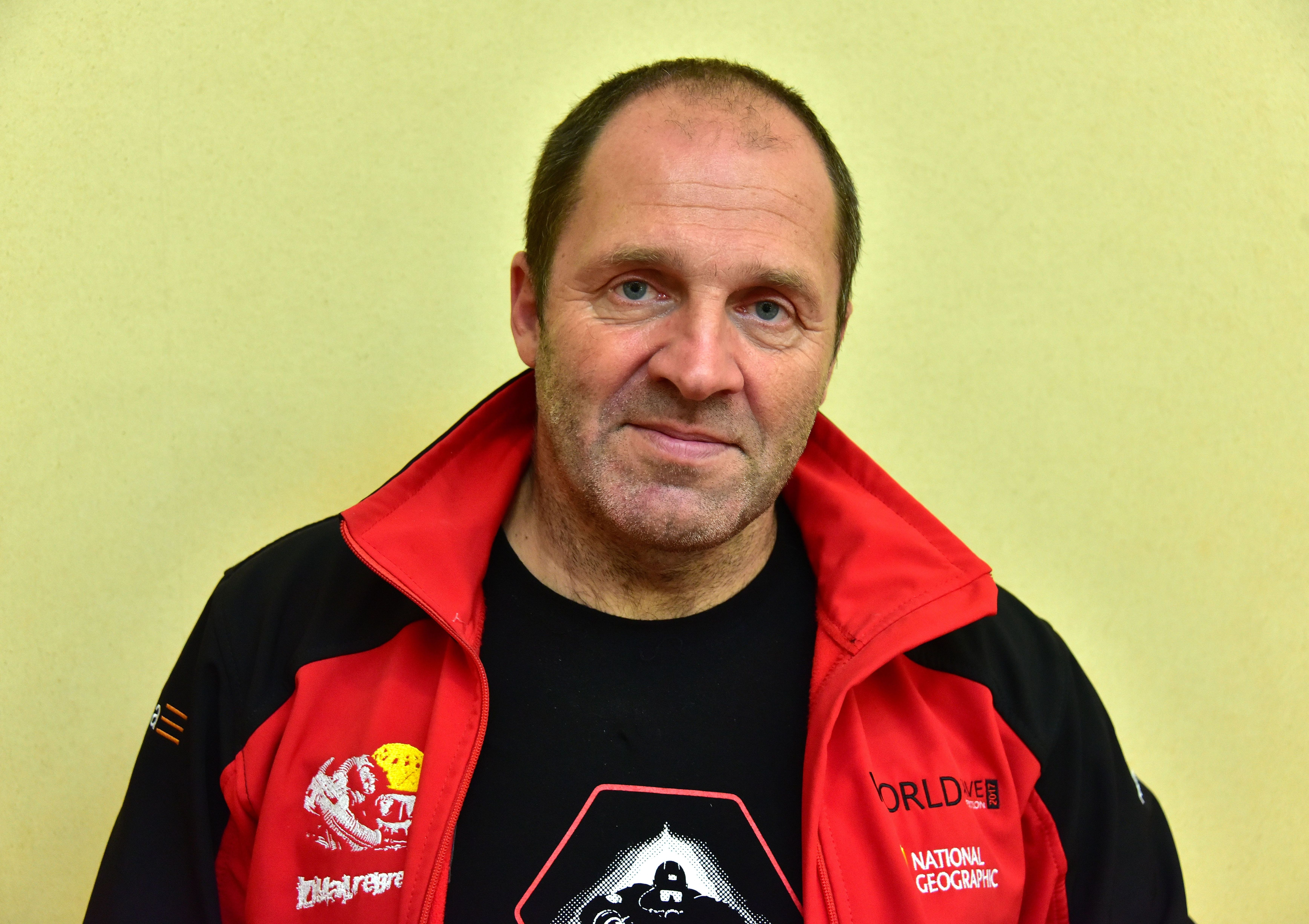
Krzysztof Starnawski

Krzysztof Starnawski (born 1968) is a Polish technical and cave diver and International Association of Nitrox and Technical Divers (IANTD), Confédération Mondiale des Activités Subaquatiques (CMAS), French Federation of Speleology (FFS) diving instructor.

== Dive records ==
All achieved with "Dual HammerHead" rebreathers of his own design.

- Open water

303 m (994 ft) on 10 September 2018 in Lake Garda, Italy.
283 m (928 ft) on 3 December 2011 in Dahab, Egypt (dive time 9 hours).

- Karst springs

279 m (915 ft) on 23 July 2016 in Lake Viroit (40°5′52.69″N 20°7′11.17″E), Albania.
265 m (869 ft) on 21 August 2015 in Hranice Abyss, Czech Republic.

== See also ==
- Deep diving
- Cave diving
- Technical diving
