= Nuno Gomes (diver) =

South African diver and holder of scuba depth record

- Born: Lisbon, Portugal
- Occupation: Civil Engineer
- Known for: Deepest cave dive (1996); Guinness World Record for deepest dive (2005)
- Awards: Guinness World Record (2005)
- Website: Personal website

Nuno Gomes is a scuba diver who lives in New York City. Born in Lisbon, his family relocated to Pretoria when he was 14 years old. He held two world records in deep diving (independently verified and approved by Guinness World Records), the cave diving record from 1996 to 2019 and the sea water record from 2005 to 2014.

== Records ==
Gomes used self-contained underwater breathing apparatus to dive to a depth of 318 metres (1,044 ft) in the sea. The dive was done in the Red Sea off the coast of Egypt near Dahab in June 2005. Gomes' total dive time was 12 hours and 20 minutes; the descent took 14 minutes. He is one of four men to have dived with scuba equipment (using trimix) below 300 m (1,000 ft); the other three are Ahmed Gabr, Mark Ellyatt, and the late John Bennett.

Gomes is also a renowned cave diver and held the World Record for the deepest cave dive, done in Boesmansgat cave (South Africa), to a depth of 283 m (927 ft), in 1996. The cave is located at an altitude of more than 1,500 m (5,000 ft) above sea level, which resulted in Nuno having to follow a decompression schedule for an equivalent sea level dive depth of 339 m (1,112 ft) to prevent decompression sickness ("the bends"). The total dive time was 12 hours and 15 minutes; the descent took 14 minutes with four minutes spent at the bottom.

== See also ==
- World's deepest scuba dives
