= Free Speech Week =

Free Speech Week (FSW), formerly known as "National Freedom of Speech Week", is a national event that recognizes free speech and press in the United States. Free Speech Week is observed during the third full week of October each year. According to its organizers, "the goal of Free Speech Week is to raise public awareness of the importance of free speech in our democracy – and to celebrate that freedom."

== Concept ==
Free Speech Week is an opportunity for individuals and organizations to undertake independent projects and activities related to free speech. The celebration is designed to raise awareness of free speech issues and encourage a broad audience to openly express themselves. Free Speech Week involves the participation of many partnering organizations, creating a multi-faceted celebration of free speech.

== History ==
The Media Institute, a nonprofit organization located in Arlington, Virginia introduced the idea for Free Speech Week in 2003. The idea was an outgrowth of the institute's "Cornerstone Project", a First Amendment program that concluded in 2003. In 2005, the Institute asked the National Association of Broadcasters Education Foundation (NABEF) to collaborate on the inaugural week. The two organizations called themselves “founding partners” and conducted National Freedom of Speech Week as a “joint effort.”

In the 2005 inaugural celebration, five "partnering organizations" were included: the American Association of Advertising Agencies, American Bar Association, Americans for the Arts, the National Constitution Center in Philadelphia, and the National Endowment for the Humanities.

Since 2005, partners have included media companies and major trade associations representing broadcasters, cable operators, newspapers, and the recording industry. Many university departments of communication and law schools have also participated as "educational partners."

In 2011, the name was shortened to “Free Speech Week.” The Media Institute created a Free Speech Week Advisory Council in 2012 to increase the reach and impact of Free Speech Week. On July 30, 2012, the Institute announced that Robert Pittman, CEO of Clear Channel Communications Inc., agreed to serve as chairman of the advisory council.

== Politics and ideology ==
Free Speech Week is neither a political event nor an ideological platform. According to the organizers, “Free Speech Week is designed as a unifying celebration, elevating the vision of the Founding Fathers above the political fray and recognizing free speech as something we can all believe in and cherish.”

== Funding and trademarks ==
Specific Free Speech Week activities (e.g., contests, seminars, exhibits) are funded by the organizations that conduct them.

The week's original title, “National Freedom of Speech Week,” was recognized by the United States Patent and Trademark Office as a mark owned by The Media Institute in March 2008. The Patent and Trademark Office also recognized the Free Speech Week slogan, “Free Speech: The Language of America,” as a protected mark owned by The Media Institute. However, the institute has always pursued a policy of “open licensing,” allowing others to use both marks without charge.
