= Jim Bowden (diver) =

Record breaking technical and cave diver

Jim Bowden is an American technical diver, known as a cave diver and as a deep diver. In 1994 he set a world record, since broken, by diving to 925 feet (282 m). He is one of only thirty-five people who have dived below a depth of 800 feet (240 m) on self-contained breathing apparatus. He has also made six dives under 500 feet (150 metres).

He was attempting a dual descent with Sheck Exley in the dive which resulted in Exley's death. Bowden had aborted his dive and ascended prior to the events which led to Exley's demise.

Bowden's record-breaking dive served as the inspiration (with Bowden's permission) for the opening chapter of Tom Morrisey's 2002 novel, Yucatan Deep.
