= Zacatón =

Water-filled sinkhole in Mexico

Coordinates: 22°59′36.05″N 98°9′57.1″W

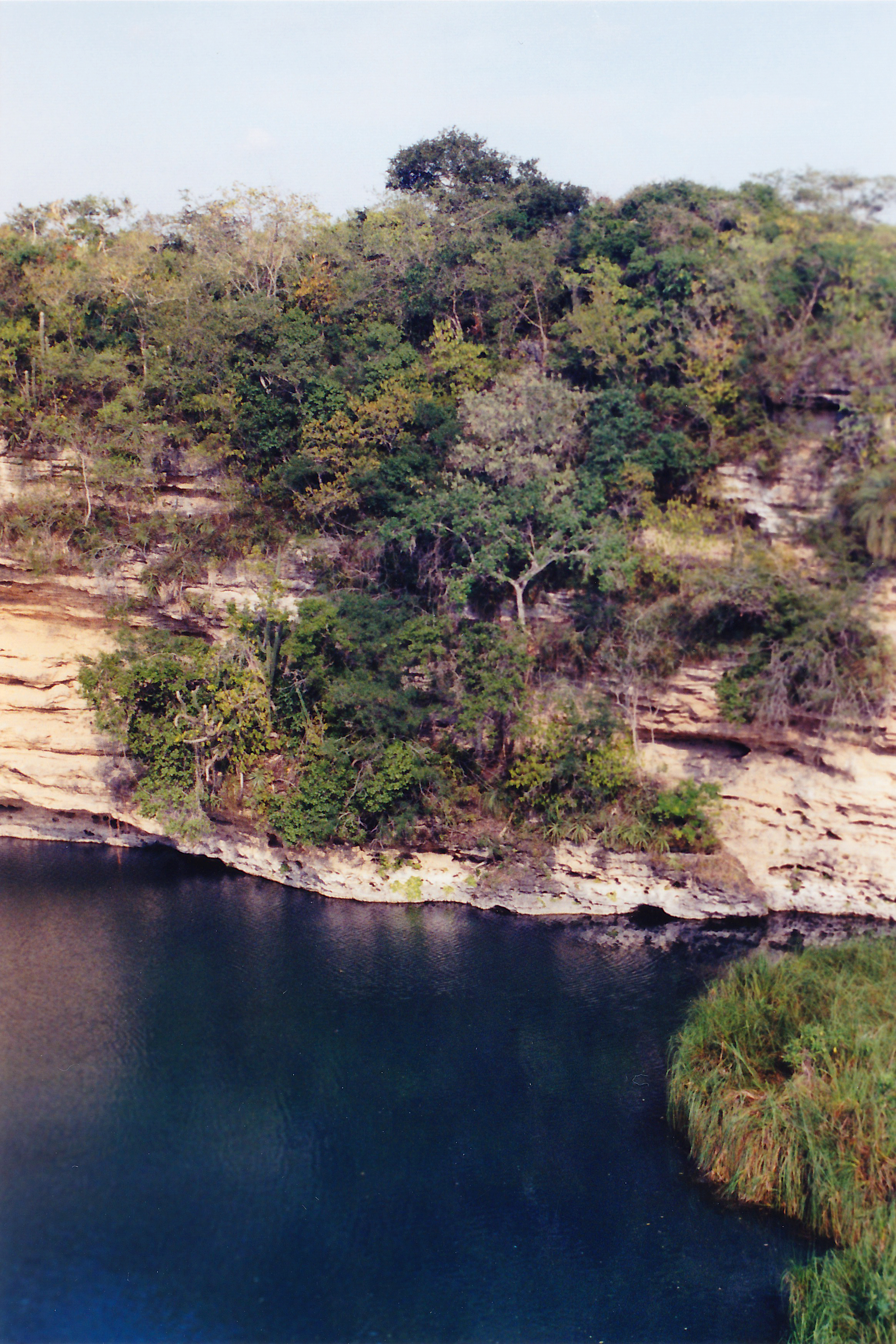
El Zacatón with free floating grass island (lower right), Municipality of Aldama, Tamaulipas, Mexico

Zacatón is a thermal water-filled cenote, or sinkhole, belonging to the Zacatón system – a group of unusual karst features located in Aldama Municipality near the Sierra de Tamaulipas in the northeastern state of Tamaulipas, Mexico. At a total depth of 339 meters (1,112 ft), it is one of the deepest known water-filled sinkholes in the world.

Using an autonomous robot, the underwater portion of Zacatón has been measured to be 319 meters (1,047 ft) deep (a 20 m or 66 ft difference between the rim of cliff and surface of water adds to the total depth). Zacatón is the only sinkhole of the five located in Rancho La Azufrosa to have any noticeable water flow.

The name Zacatón comes from the free-floating islands of zacate grass which move around on the surface with the wind.

Scrapings from the rock walls beneath the surface yielded at least three new phyla of bacteria.

== Diving ==
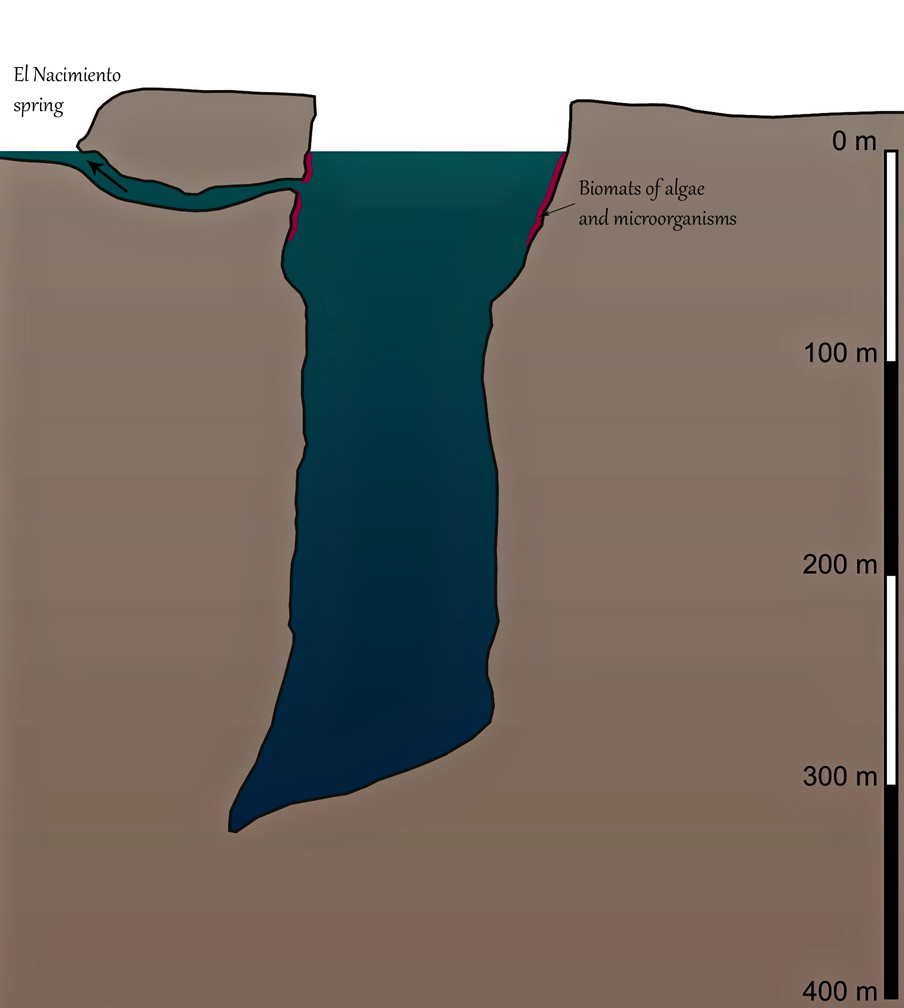
Zacaton sinkhole, cross-section

El Zacatón's depth has made it an important dive site:

- Dr. Ann Kristovich set the women's world depth record of 169 m (554 ft) during a 1993 dive into the sinkhole.
- On April 6, 1994, explorer diver Jim Bowden and cave diving pioneer Sheck Exley entered El Zacatón with the intent of reaching the bottom. Bowden dived to a men's world record depth of 282 m (925 ft), but Exley died, probably from high-pressure nervous syndrome (HPNS) at a depth of 268 to 276 m (879 to 906 ft).
- The NASA Deep Phreatic Thermal Explorer (DEPTHX) project used the sinkhole as a testbed for robotic hardware being developed to explore the Jovian moon of Europa. DEPTHX was designed and integrated by NASA principal investigator Stone Aerospace. Additional co-investigators on the Deep Phreatic Thermal Explorer (DEPTHX) team included Carnegie Mellon University, Southwest Research Institute, Colorado School of Mines, The University of Arizona, and the University of Texas at Austin's Jackson School of Geosciences. This exploration led to the discovery of 100 different microbes in the water, including three entirely new phyla of bacteria.

== Hydrogeology ==
Zacatón is just one of the numerous sinkholes and other karst features in the region which features more than 15 sinkholes, several cave systems, and karst springs with caves. Several of these karst features have unusual characteristics like travertine lids over several of the sinkholes with isolated waterbodies below.

Since the late 1990s, Dr. Marcus Gary, a hydrogeologist at the Edwards Aquifer Authority and adjunct professor at the Jackson School of Geosciences, University of Texas at Austin has studied Sistema Zacatón to understand how the sinkholes formed and how they evolve over time. During these studies, Gary made extensive use of a number of investigative tools, including those on the DEPTHX probe, geophysics, isotope geochemistry, field mapping, and geomicrobiology. Gary was a primary member and a principal investigator on the DEPTHX mission, which used an autonomous underwater robot to explore the deepest parts of Zacatón for the first time.

According to Gary, these sinkholes began to form during the Pleistocene as a result of volcanic activity from below. This view differs from the classical theory of cave formation and also hypotheses about the formation of other large caves in this part of Mexico. In this view, volcanism turned deep water slightly acidic by adding dissolved carbon dioxide and hydrogen sulfide. This water slowly dissolved the limestone above, creating porous karst. This is referred to as “hypogenic karstification.” From time to time, overlying rock collapsed into hollow chambers below, creating deep shafts. If his interpretation is correct, Sistema Zacatón has more in common with Mammoth Hot Springs in Yellowstone than with other deep sinkholes in this same region of Mexico.

Another interesting hydrogeologic feature is that some of the sinkholes appear to be in the process of closing up at the top as crusts of travertine (a form of calcium carbonate) form at their surfaces. Marc Airhart, a science writer at the Jackson School of Geosciences wrote:

It’s a bit like the skin on a can of paint that has been left open in the sun. For the paint, it might take a day or two. In this case, the process probably takes thousands of years. It is basically the sinkhole’s way of taking a bunch of dissolved rock floating in the water and recycling it to form new rock at the surface. At least one sinkhole (Poza Seca) appears to have closed up entirely, sealing off an underwater lake, possibly with unusual life forms. If such life forms exist, they’re likely to be bacteria that can live without oxygen and sunlight. And assuming the lake has been sealed off from the outside world for thousands and thousands of years, they might have evolved to be different from anything scientists have ever discovered and characterized before.

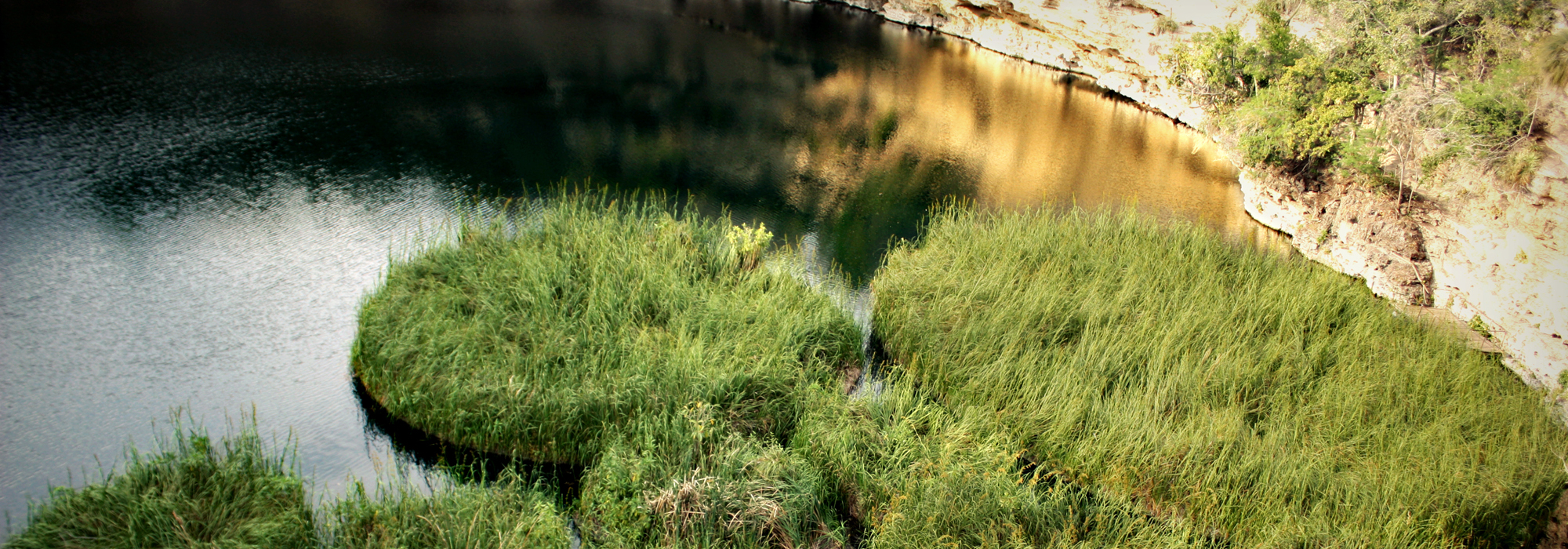
Free floating grass islands in the cenote Zacaton (2010).

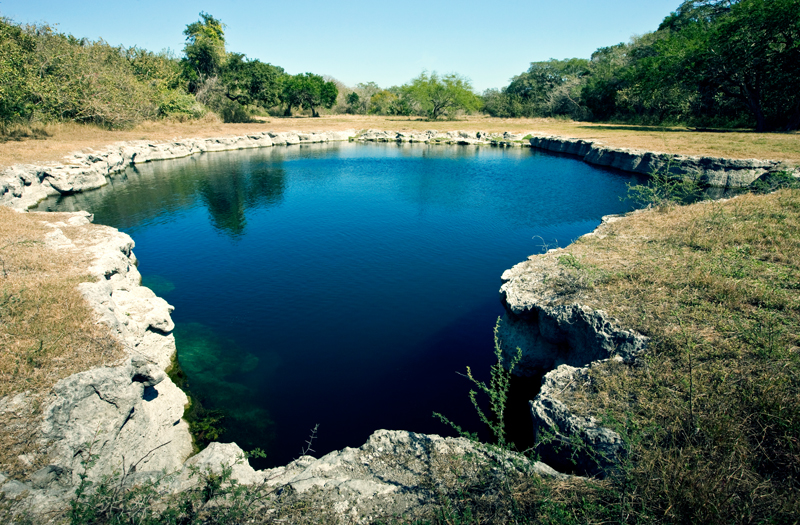
One of the many smaller cenotes, or sinkholes, in the Zacatón system the near Aldama, Tamaulipas (2013)

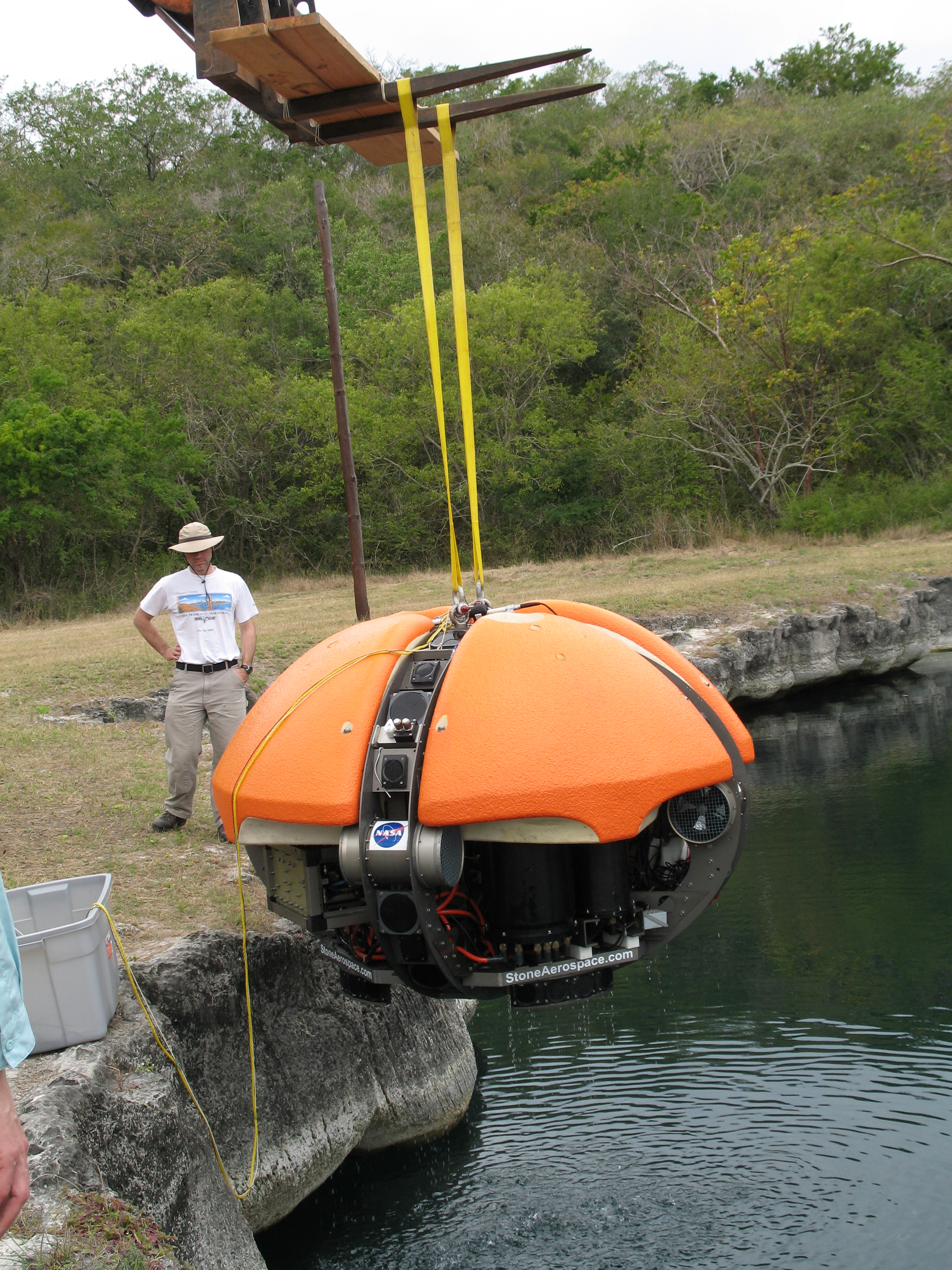
Deep Phreatic Thermal Explorer (DEPTHX) robot being lowered into La Pilita, one of several sinkholes in Sistema Zacaton (2007)

== See also ==
- Cenote
- DEPTHX
- List of sinkholes of Mexico
