= Boesmansgat =

Sinkhole and dive site in South Africa

- Location within South Africa Location within Northern Cape
- Interactive map of Boesmansgat
- Location: Daniëlskuil, Northern Cape
- Coordinates: 27°55′18″S 23°38′30″E
- Depth: 283 m (928 ft)
- Elevation: 1500 metres

Boesmansgat (or Bushmansgat), also known in English as "Bushman's Hole", is a deep submerged freshwater cave (or sinkhole) in the Northern Cape province of South Africa, which has been dived to a depth of 283.9 metres (931 ft).

Nuno Gomes dived to a record depth of 282.6 metres (927 ft) in 1996. Its altitude of over 1,500 metres (4,921 ft) makes this a particularly challenging dive, requiring a decompression schedule equivalent for a dive to 339 metres (1,112 ft) at sea level. Gomes' dive was a close call, as he got stuck in the mud on the bottom of Bushman's Hole for two minutes before escaping.

On 24 November 2004, Verna van Schaik set the Guinness Woman's World Record for the deepest scuba dive by a woman, diving down to a depth of 221 metres (725 ft).

In October 2022 Karen van den Oever broke her own Guinness World Record when she descended to 246.65 metres (809.2 ft) using open-circuit equipment.

In May 2024, Richard Harris used hydrogen as a breathing gas in his twin rebreather system to explore the bottom of the cave, at a depth of 283.9 metres (931 ft) . On his second dive to 272 metres (892 ft) and accompanied by dive partner Craig Challen, Harris suffered decompression sickness requiring treatment in a Johannesburg Hospital.

== Deaths ==
- In 1993, Eben Leyden died after blacking out at a depth of 60 metres (200 ft). Leyden was brought up immediately by diving buddy Boetie Sheun but could not be revived.
- In 1994, while helping a team prepare for a dive, Deon Dreyer died on ascent at a depth of 50 metres (164 ft). Dreyer's body remained in the cave until being discovered ten years later at a depth of 270 metres (886 ft) by cave diver Dave Shaw.
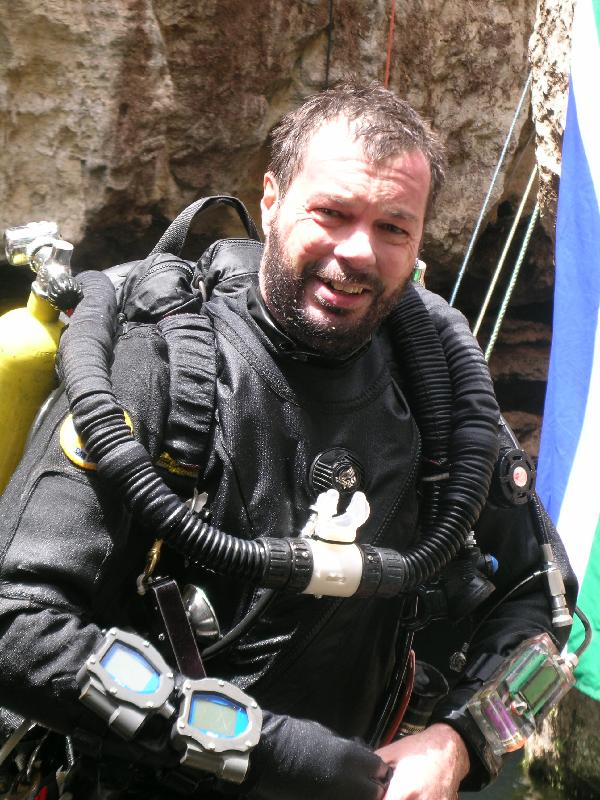
- Dave Shaw at Boesmansgat in 2005
  On 8 January 2005, Shaw himself died after becoming tangled in the line while attempting to recover Dreyer's body. (Shaw's close friend and support diver, Don Shirley, nearly died as well and was left with permanent ear damage that has impaired his balance.) On 12 January 2005, Dreyer and Shaw's bodies were ultimately recovered near the surface, while members of the dive team were recovering technical equipment, which included a camera that filmed Shaw's last moments in the water.

== In literature ==
In Mo Hayder's novel Ritual (2008), the death of the parents of one of the protagonists while diving in Bushman's Hole is an important plot device.

== In media ==
The 2005 attempt to recover Deon Dreyer's body that led to the death of Dave Shaw is the subject of the 2020 documentary Dave Not Coming Back.

"The Last Dive of David Shaw", the third track of Australian post-rock band We Lost the Sea's album Departure Songs, was inspired by the same incident.
