= Mark Ellyatt =

British technical diver and previous depth record holder

- Born: UK
- Occupation: technical diver & Instructor
- Website: http://www.inspired-training.com

Mark Ellyatt is a British technical diver and instructor. He teaches technical diving all over the world, including the UK, Egypt, Lebanon and Greece.

== World records ==
Mark Ellyatt held the record for the world's deepest dive reaching 313 m (1,027 ft) in 2003 35 miles off the coast of Phuket, Thailand with a dive lasting seven hours, beating John Bennett's previous 308 m (1,010 ft) record. Ellyatt's dive computer reading from the dive was made available.

In 2003, during a previous extreme deep diving attempt Ellyatt suffered extreme isobaric counterdiffusion (ICD) during decompression, and only survived the dive by virtue of being helped by his support divers. ICD is a common malady in extreme deep diving, and nearly claimed the life of John Bennett in his world record setting deep dive. Don Shirley also suffered extremely serious ICD during the dive which killed Dave Shaw.

== HMS Victoria ==
Ellyatt assisted the local diver Christian Francis in discovering the wreck of the battleship HMS Victoria in 2004, 150m underwater off Tripoli, Lebanon. The wreck sits vertically on its bow, partly buried in the seabed - described as being its 'own underwater tombstone'.

== Ocean Gladiator ==
Mark Ellyat has written about his early diving experiences and later record attempts in his book Ocean Gladiator, published in 2005.
