= John Bennett (diver) =

British technical diver and former record holder lost in commercial diving incident

John Bennett (7 March 1959 – 15 March 2004) was a British scuba diver who set a world record by becoming the first person to deep dive below a depth of 300 m (1,000 ft) on self-contained breathing apparatus on 6 November 2001.

== Career ==
Bennett first broke the record in 1999 when he reached 200 m (660 ft) accompanied by Chuck Driver. In 2000 Bennett set a new record of 254 m (833 ft), before his final record-breaking dive to 308 m (1,010 ft) in 2001. Having founded Atlantis Dive in the Philippines in the late 1990s, Bennett and his world record breaking team, including Ron Loos, Mark Cox and Targa Mann went on to establish Tech Dive Academy in Port Douglas, Australia.

In the early 2000s, Bennett and Loos made the first dives to the MV Princess of the Orient wreck site, which is located off Fortune Island, outside and to the south of Manila Bay. In 2001, he located the wreck of the Imperial Japanese Navy dreadnought Yamashiro in the Surigao Strait (between the Philippine islands of Leyte and Dinagat) through sound scans, but could not confirm it before his death. Confirmation was not made until 2017.

== Personal life and death ==
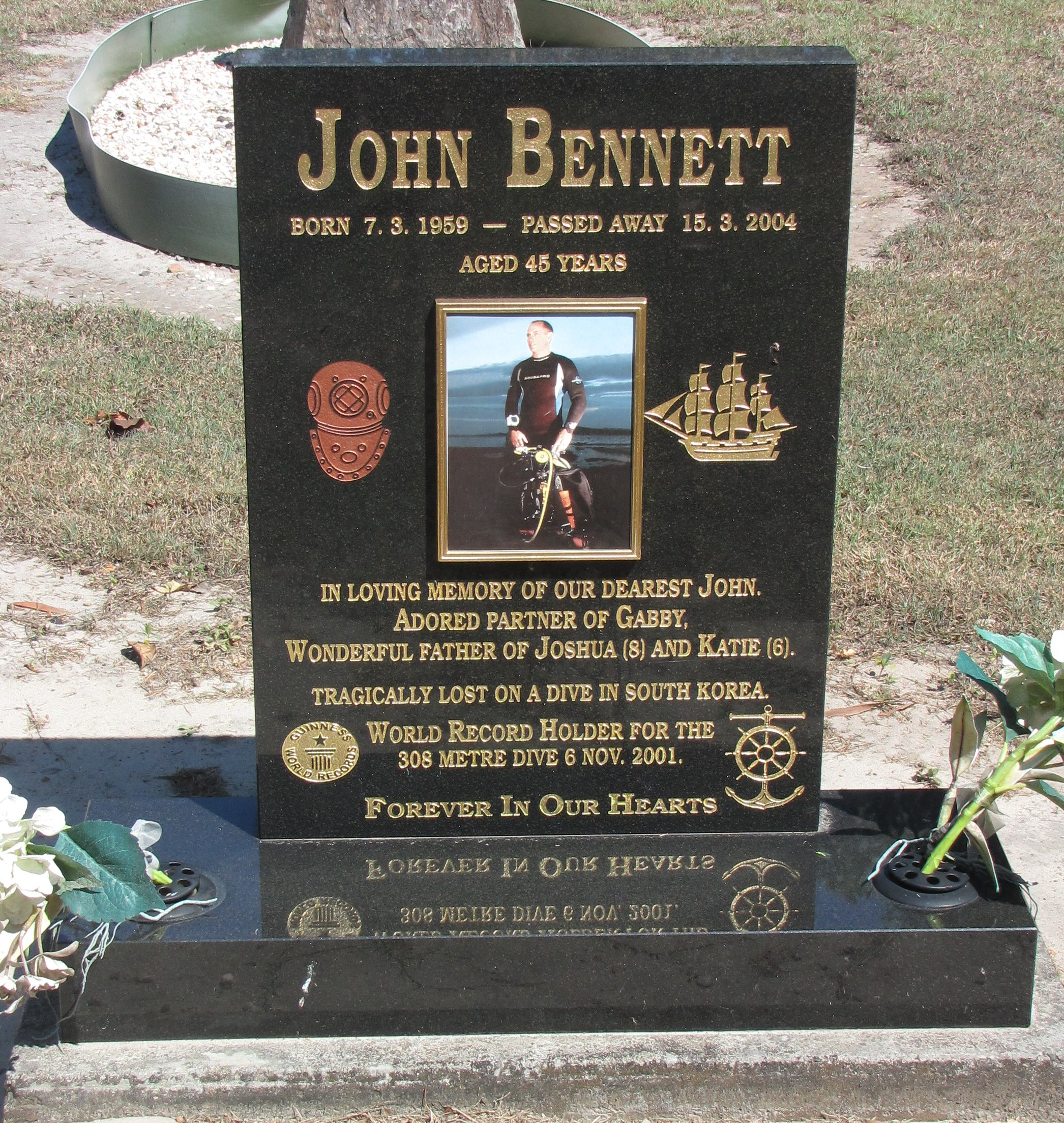
John Bennett Memorial Port Douglas Cemetery.

Bennett was married and had children. He went missing on 15 March 2004 in a commercial diving incident in Korea. He was declared legally dead in 2006, but his body has never been recovered.

== See also ==
- Disappearance of Ben McDaniel – Scuba diver who disappeared during or after a cave dive
- World's deepest SCUBA dives
