= Dave Shaw =

Australian technical diver (1954–2005)

David Shaw
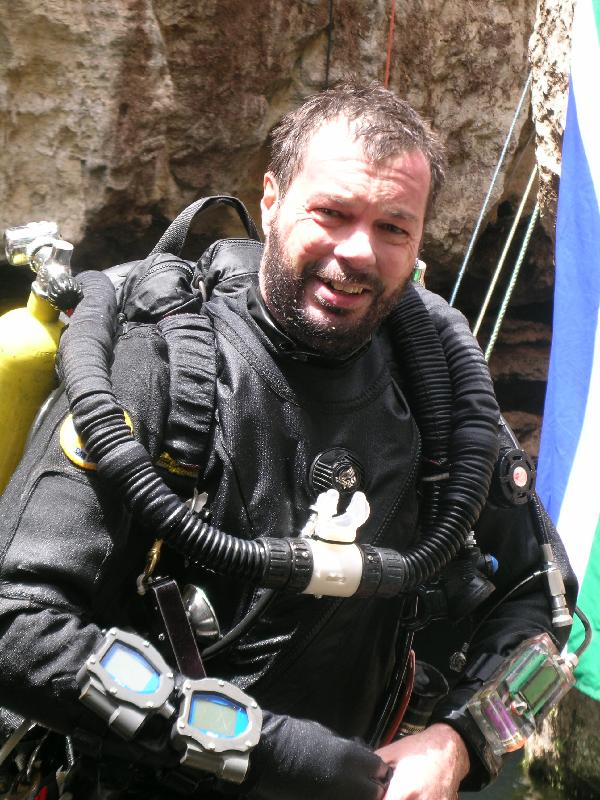
- Dave Shaw at Boesmansgat in 2005
- Born: David John Shaw; 20 July 1954; Katanning, Australia
- Died: 8 January 2005 (aged 50); Boesmansgat, South Africa
- Other name: David Shaw
- Occupation: Airline pilot
- Known for: Cave diving depth record
- Spouse: Ann Shaw
- Children: Lisa Shaw (Moyers), Steven Shaw
- Website: www.deepcave.com

David John Shaw (20 July 1954 – 8 January 2005) was an Australian scuba diver, technical diver, and airline pilot for Cathay Pacific. He started flying for Cathay Pacific in 1989, flying the Lockheed L-1011 Tristar, 747-400, A330-300, A340-300, and A340-600. Before flying for Cathay Pacific, he flew for Mission Aviation Fellowship in Papua New Guinea and Tanzania. He also flew agricultural aircraft in South Australia and New South Wales. Shaw was a passionate scuba and technical diver, and died in 2005 attempting to retrieve a body stuck in South Africa's Boesmansgat cave.

== Dive equipment ==
Shaw's first rebreather was an AP Inspiration closed circuit rebreather, with which he eventually dived to depths beyond its purported capability. This prompted him to not only purchase a Mk15.5 but to replace its analogue electronics with the digital ones of the Juergensen Marine Hammerhead, resulting in a specially modified POD designed to handle extreme pressures. The Mk15.5 was his rebreather of choice for dives deeper than 150 metres (500 ft). For extended dives in caves shallower than 150 m, Shaw used his Cis-Lunar since he believed it had superior redundancy capabilities, but could not cope with extreme depths.

== Diving records ==
On 28 October 2004, Shaw descended to a depth of 270 metres (890 ft) at Bushman's Hole, South Africa, breaking the following records:

- Depth on a rebreather
- Depth in a cave on a rebreather
- Depth at altitude on a rebreather
- Depth running a line

He used a Mk15.5 with Juergensen Marine Hammerhead electronics and the following gas mixtures: trimix 4/80, 10/70, 15/55, 17/40, 26/25, air, nitrox50, 100% oxygen. The cave elevation was 1,550 metres (5,090 ft) and the dive duration was 9 hours and 40 minutes.

On this dive, Shaw discovered the body of Deon Dreyer, a South African diver who had died in Bushman's Hole ten years previously. The body was at a depth of 270 metres (890 ft).

== Last dive ==
Shaw died on 8 January 2005 while attempting to recover the body of Deon Dreyer.

Shaw recorded his dive with an underwater camera, which allowed researchers to determine that he suffered from respiratory issues due to the high pressure. Shaw ran into difficulties when the body unexpectedly began to float. Shaw had been advised by various experts that the body would remain negatively buoyant because the visible parts were reduced to the skeleton. However, within his drysuit, Dreyer's corpse had turned into a soap-like substance called adipocere, which floats. Shaw had been working with both hands, and so had been resting his can light on the cave floor. The powerful underwater lights that cave divers use are connected by wires to heavy battery canisters, normally worn on the cave diver's waist, or sometimes attached to their tanks. Normally he would have wrapped the wire behind his neck, but he was unable to do so; the lines from the body bag appear to have become entangled with the light head, and the physical effort of trying to free himself led to his death. Three days later, both of the bodies that had become entangled in the lines were pulled up to near the surface as the dive team was retrieving their equipment.

Shaw's close friend and support diver, Don Shirley, nearly died as well and was left with permanent damage that has impaired his balance.

The dive on which Shaw died was the 333rd of his career. At the time of his world record dive, he had been diving for a little over five years.

His death has been profiled in a number of documentary films, including the 2020 documentary feature Dave Not Coming Back. Australian band We Lost the Sea's 2015 concept album Departure Songs features a song titled The Last Dive of David Shaw which uses audio recorded during the dive.

== Personal life ==
Shaw was a Christian. He and his wife, Ann, lived in Hong Kong, where they were members of a small Christian congregation. They had two children, Steven Shaw and Lisa (née Shaw) Moyers.
