= Index of underwater diving: A–C =

Alphabetical listing of underwater diving related topics

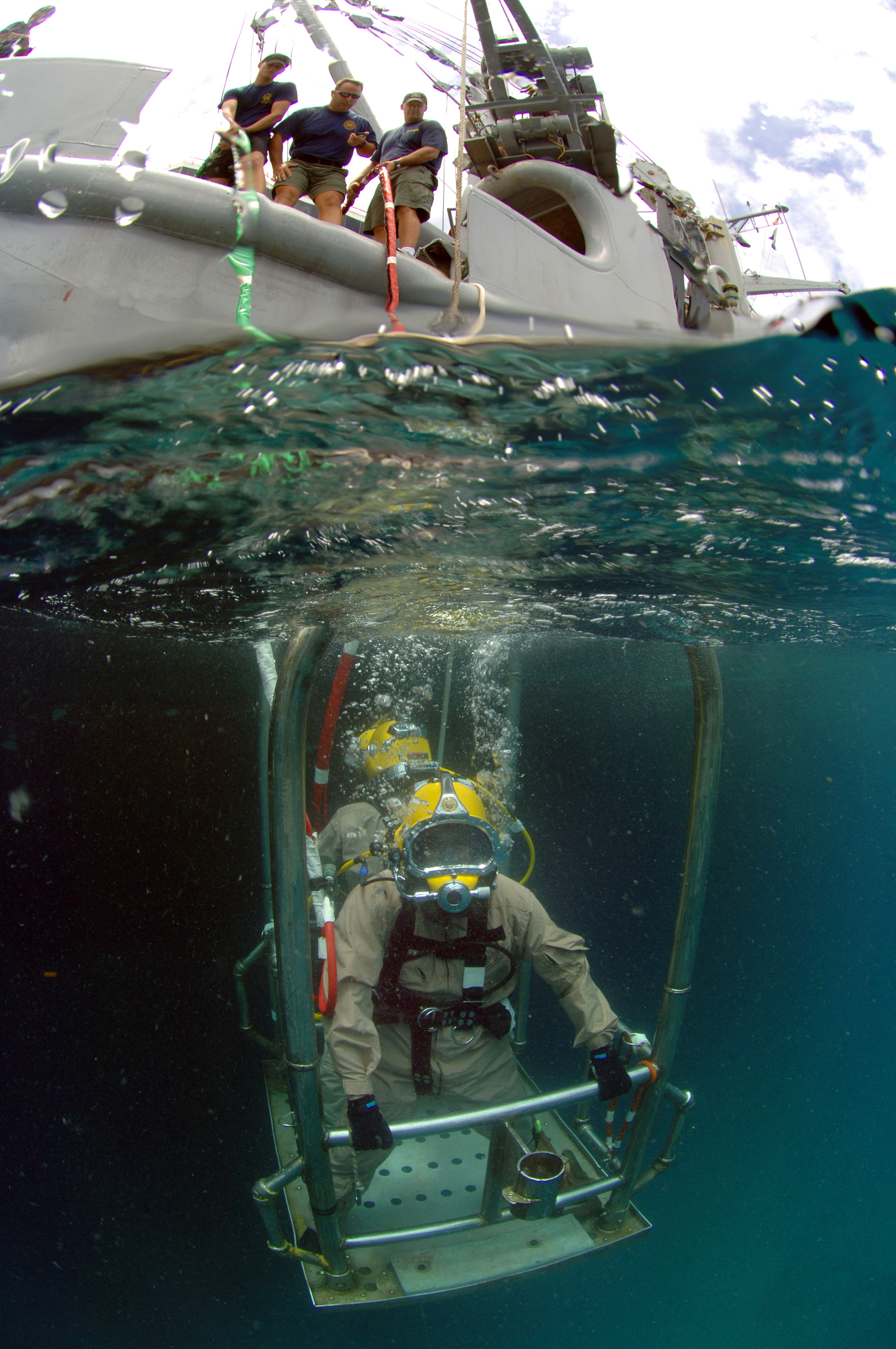
Surface-supplied divers riding a stage to the underwater workplace

The following index is provided as an overview of and topical guide to underwater diving: Links to articles and redirects to sections of articles which provide information on each topic are listed with a short description of the topic. When there is more than one article with information on a topic, the most relevant is usually listed, and it may be cross-linked to further information from the linked page or section.

Underwater diving can be described as all of the following:

- A human activity – intentional, purposive, conscious and subjectively meaningful sequence of actions. Underwater diving is practiced as part of an occupation, or for recreation, where the practitioner submerges below the surface of the water or other liquid for a period which may range between seconds to order of a day at a time, either exposed to the ambient pressure or isolated by a pressure resistant suit, to interact with the underwater environment for pleasure, competitive sport, or as a means to reach a work site for profit or in the pursuit of knowledge, and may use no equipment at all, or a wide range of equipment which may include breathing apparatus, environmental protective clothing, aids to vision, communication, propulsion, maneuverability, buoyancy control and safety equipment, and tools for the task at hand.

There are seven sub-indexes, listed here. The tables of content should link between them automatically:

- Index of underwater diving: A–C
- Index of underwater diving: D–E
- Index of underwater diving: F–K
- Index of underwater diving: L–N
- Index of underwater diving: O–R
- Index of underwater diving: S
- Index of underwater diving: T–Z

== 0–9 ==
Contents: Top	0–9	A	B	C	D	E	F	G	H	I	J	K	L	M	N	O	P	Q	R	S	T	U	V	W	X	Y	Z

- 14th CMAS Underwater Photography World Championship – 2013 photography competition held in Cuba
- 1973 Mount Gambier cave diving accident – Scuba cave diving incident in South Australia
- 1982 invasion of the Falkland Islands – Argentine invasion of the Falklands
- 1992 cageless shark-diving expedition – First recorded cageless dive with great white sharks
- 2011 Finswimming World Championships – 2011 swimming competition held in Hungary
- 2013 Finswimming World Championships – International competition in Kazan, Russia
- 2016 Finswimming World Championships – International competition in Volos, Greece
- 2018 Finswimming World Championships – International competition in Belgrade, Serbia
- 35-ton deep-submergence rescue vehicle – Chinese Navy submarine rescue submersible
- 8A4-class ROUV – Chinese work class remotely operated underwater vehicle

== A ==
Contents: Top	0–9	A	B	C	D	E	F	G	H	I	J	K	L	M	N	O	P	Q	R	S	T	U	V	W	X	Y	Z

Section contents: Top of section, Aa–Ab, Ac, Ad, Ae, Af–Ag, Ai, Al, Am, An, Ap, Aq, Ar, As, At, Au, Av

=== Aa–Ab ===
- AAI underwater revolver – Six-round amphibious revolver for naval use
- A Blueprint for Survival (cave diving) – Book on cave diving safety by Sheck Exley
- ABISMO – Japanese remotely operated underwater vehicle for deep sea exploration
- ABLJ – Configuration of diving buoyancy compensator

=== Ac ===
Section contents: Top of section, Aa–Ab, Ac, Ad, Ae, Af–Ag, Ai, Al, Am, An, Ap, Aq, Ar, As, At, Au, Av

- Acceptable risk – Risk that is understood and tolerated
- Acceptably safe – Term in occupational health and safety
- Accelerated decompression – Decompresssion using oxygen-rich breathing gases
- Acoustic beacon – Device that emits a sound signal to aid location underwater
- Acoustic positioning system – System for tracking and navigation of underwater vehicles or divers using acoustic signals
- Active addition rebreather – Semi closed circuit rebreather type
- Active cooling – Cooling methods that expend energy to cool a system or component
- Active heating – Directed application of an external heat source to control thermal balance
- Active heating of divers – Thermal control using an artificial heat source
- Acute dysbaric disorder – Injury caused by short term exposure to pressure variation
- Acute oxygen toxicity – Adverse effects of high partial pressures of oxygen on the central nervous system

=== Ad ===
Section contents: Top of section, Aa–Ab, Ac, Ad, Ae, Af–Ag, Ai, Al, Am, An, Ap, Aq, Ar, As, At, Au, Av

- Adaptive diving – Scuba diving using techniques modified to compensate for disabilities
- Adaptive scuba diving – Recreational diving by people with disabilities using modified techniques
- Adaptive Support Diver – Scuba diver trained to support divers with disabilities
- Adjustable buoyancy life jacket (ABLJ) – Chest inflation type buoyancy compensator
- Administrative controls – Class of occupational hazard control
- ADS 2000 atmospheric diving system – US Navy armoured diving suit
- ADS amphibious rifle – Russian bullpup assault rifle for combat divers
- Advanced diver (disambiguation) – Ambiguous term
- Advanced Diving Equipment Company – American manufacturer of surface supplied diving helmets
- Advanced European Scientific Diver – A diver competent to organise a scientific diving team
- Advanced Open Water Diver – Recreational scuba diving certification slightly above minimum entry level
- Advanced open-water diver – Recreational scuba diving certification level slightly above minimum entry level
- Advanced nitrox diver – Technical diving qualification to use multiple mixtures of oxygen enriched air
- Advanced SEAL Delivery System – Former Navy SEAL mini-sub deployed from submarines
- Advanced trimix diver – Recreational technical diving certification to use hypoxic trimix

=== Ae ===
Section contents: Top of section, Aa–Ab, Ac, Ad, Ae, Af–Ag, Ai, Al, Am, An, Ap, Aq, Ar, As, At, Au, Av

- Aeris (dive gear) – American brand of scuba equipment
- Aerosinusitis – Barotrauma of the sinuses
- Aerospace Medical Association – Professional organization in aviation, space, hyperbaric and environmental medicine
- Aer-Sub – Branding used by Cressi-Sub for scuba equipment

=== Af–Ag ===
- AFLOLAUN – Apparatus for laying out line and underwater navigation
- Aggressive decompression – Decompression practice accepting higher risk of DCS to reduce in-water time

=== Ai ===
Section contents: Top of section, Aa–Ab, Ac, Ad, Ae, Af–Ag, Ai, Al, Am, An, Ap, Aq, Ar, As, At, Au, Av

- AIDA Hellas – National representative of AIDA International in Greece
- AIDA International (AIDA) – Worldwide rule- and record-keeping body for competitive breath-hold events
- Air diving – Underwater diving using air as the breathing gas
- Air embolism – Vascular blockage by air bubbles
- Air-integrated dive computer – Dive computer which displays cylinder breathing gas pressure
- Air integration – Use of the dive computer to display cylinder gas pressure
- Airlift (dredging device), also known as air-lift (dredging device) – Dredging device using injected air to move water and entrained load up a pipe
- Airlift dredge – Dredging device using injected air to move water and entrained load up a pipe
- Airlift dredging – Removing underwater sediment using an airlift pump
- Air line – Tube or hose carrying a compressed air supply
- Air-line diving, also known as airline diving – Basic mode of surface-supplied underwater diving
- Airlock, also known as air-lock – Compartment for transfer between environments with different atmospheres
- Air lock diving bell – Type of mobile pressure caisson
- Air lock diving-bell plant – Underwater work support barge used at Gibraltar
- Air panel operator – Operator of the surface-supplied breathing air distribution panel
- Air spread – The topside base for surface-supplied air diving operations
- Air top, also known as air top-up – Modifying or completing a gas blend by adding compressed air

=== Al ===
Section contents: Top of section, Aa–Ab, Ac, Ad, Ae, Af–Ag, Ai, Al, Am, An, Ap, Aq, Ar, As, At, Au, Av

- Alert Diver – Quarterly magazine published by DAN
- Algal bloom – Spread of planktonic algae in water
- Alpazat cave rescue – Six British soldiers trapped in a flooded Mexican cave
- Al-Sabehat – Iranian swimmer delivery vehicle
- Alternative air source, also known as Alternate air source – Emergency supply of breathing gas for an underwater diver
- Alternative air supply – Emergency supply of breathing air for an underwater diver
- Alternative ascent system – Buoyant object with ascent line carried by scuba diver to control ascent
- Alternative gas supply – Emergency breathing gas supply
- Alternobaric vertigo – Dizziness resulting from unequal pressures in the middle ears
- Altitude decompression – Reduction in ambient pressure due to ascent above sea level
- Altitude diver – Diver competent to plan decompression at altitude
- Altitude Diver – Diver qualification for the skills to decompress at altitude
- Altitude diving – Underwater diving at altitudes above 300 m
- Aluminaut – First aluminum-hulled submarine

=== Am ===
Section contents: Top of section, Aa–Ab, Ac, Ad, Ae, Af–Ag, Ai, Al, Am, An, Ap, Aq, Ar, As, At, Au, Av

- Ama (diving) – Japanese pearl divers
- Ambient pressure – Pressure of the surrounding medium
- Ambient pressure at depth – Pressure in an underwater environment
- Ambient pressure diver – Diver exposed to the ambient pressure of the dive site
- American Academy of Underwater Sciences (AAUS) – American diving standards organisation
- American Canadian Underwater Certifications (ACUC) – Recreational diver training and certification agency
- American Nitrox Divers International (ANDI) – Recreational diver training and certification agency
- Amontons' law – Relationship between pressure and temperature of a gas at constant volume

=== An ===
Section contents: Top of section, Aa–Ab, Ac, Ad, Ae, Af–Ag, Ai, Al, Am, An, Ap, Aq, Ar, As, At, Au, Av

- Anchor pattern – Arrangement of anchors allowing precise positioning of a vessel
- Andersson, Erik – Swedish manufacturer of standard diving equipment
- Ankle strap (diving) – Staps worn over the ankles of dry suits to prevent the boots from pulling off when in use
- Ankle weights (diving) – Diver trim weights worn at the ankles
- ANMP – Association nationale des moniteurs de plongée
- ANSTI breathing simulator, also known as ANSTI machine, ANSTI breathing machine – Machine to measure work of breathing of diving apparatus
- Anti-fog – Chemicals that prevent the condensation of water as small droplets on a surface
- Anti-frogman techniques – Methods of protection from incursions by divers and swimmers
- Antipodes (submersible) – Commercial submarine built in 1973
- AN/WQX-2 – Diver detection sonar used in defense against underwater incursions
- Anxiety – Unpleasant emotion

=== Ap ===
Section contents: Top of section, Aa–Ab, Ac, Ad, Ae, Af–Ag, Ai, Al, Am, An, Ap, Aq, Ar, As, At, Au, Av

- AP Diving – British manufacturer of underwater diving equipment
- Apeks – British manufacturer of scuba diving equipment
- Apnea blackout – Loss of consciousness caused by cerebral hypoxia towards the end of a breath-hold dive
- Apnea finswimming, also known as Apnoea finswimming – Underwater swimming in a swimming pool using mask, monofin and holding one's breath.
- Apparatus for laying out line and underwater navigation (AFLOLAUN) – Equipment used by early cave divers
- Apparent weight – Weight of an object when a force additional to gravity is present
- APS underwater rifle – Soviet underwater assault firearm firing unrifled steel flechettes

=== Aq ===
Section contents: Top of section, Aa–Ab, Ac, Ad, Ae, Af–Ag, Ai, Al, Am, An, Ap, Aq, Ar, As, At, Au, Av

- Aquaculture diving – Underwater diving in support of aquaculture installations
- Aqua Lung America – American company manufacturing recreational diving equipment
- Aqua Lung/La Spirotechnique – French company manufacturing breathing apparatus and diving equipment
- Aqua-Lung – Original name for open-circuit scuba equipment
- Aquanaut – Diver who remains underwater for 24 hours or more
- Aquarium diving – Occupational diving in large aquariums
- Aquascope – Underwater viewing device
- Aquathlon (underwater wrestling) – Competitive underwater wrestling
- Aqueon – Diver powered propulsion device

=== Ar ===
Section contents: Top of section, Aa–Ab, Ac, Ad, Ae, Af–Ag, Ai, Al, Am, An, Ap, Aq, Ar, As, At, Au, Av

- Archaeological diving – Method in underwater archaeology
- Archaeology of shipwrecks – Study of human activity through the analysis of shipwreck artifacts
- Archimède – French Navy bathyscaphe
- Archimedes' principle – Buoyancy principle in fluid dynamics
- Argox – Gas mixture occasionally used by scuba divers for dry-suit inflation
- Army engineer diver – Armed forces occupation
- Army Ranger Wing – Special operations force of the Irish Defence Forces
- Artificial gills (human) – Hypothetical devices to extract oxygen from water
- Artificial reef – Human-made underwater structure that functions as a reef
- Artificial Reef Society of British Columbia (ARSBC) – Canadian non-profit to create artificial reefs for habitat enhancement and recreation
- AR vest – Type of jacket harness for surface-supplied diving

=== As ===
Section contents: Top of section, Aa–Ab, Ac, Ad, Ae, Af–Ag, Ai, Al, Am, An, Ap, Aq, Ar, As, At, Au, Av

- Ascending and descending (diving) – Procedures for safe ascent and descent in underwater diving
- Ascending excursion – Saturation dive where ambient pressure is less than storage pressure
- Ascent and descent (diving) – Procedures for safe ascent and descent in underwater diving
- Ascent blackout – Loss of consciousness caused by cerebral hypoxia on ascending from a deep freedive
- Ascent rate (diving) – Speed at which the diver ascends from a dive
- Ascents and descents (diving) – Procedures for safe ascent and descent in underwater diving
- Ascent to altitude after diving – A type of extended decompression
- ASM-DT amphibious rifle – Russian folding stock underwater firearm
- Asphyxia – Severely deficient supply of oxygen
- Assisted ascent – An emergency ascent during which the diver is provided with breathing gas by another diver
- Association nationale des moniteurs de plongée – French recreational diver training and certification agency
- Association of Offshore Diving Contractors (AODC) – Precursor to International Marine Contractors Association
- Association of Diving Contractors International (ADCI) – Non-profit organization for promoting standards and knowledge for commercial diving

=== At ===
Section contents: Top of section, Aa–Ab, Ac, Ad, Ae, Af–Ag, Ai, Al, Am, An, Ap, Aq, Ar, As, At, Au, Av

- Atlantis ROV Team – High-school underwater robotics team from Whidbey Island, Washington, United States
- Atmospheric diving suit – Articulated pressure-resistant anthropomorphic housing for an underwater diver
- Atmospheric diving system – Diving equipment that isolates the diver from ambient pressure
- Atmospheric pressure diving, also known as atmospheric suit diving – Diving in an articulated pressure resistant anthropomorphic housing
- Atmospheric pressure – Static pressure exerted by the weight of the Earth's atmosphere
- Atrial septal defect – Human heart defect present at birth
- Attitude (diver) – Alignment of the principle axes of a diver in the water

=== Au ===
Section contents: Top of section, Aa–Ab, Ac, Ad, Ae, Af–Ag, Ai, Al, Am, An, Ap, Aq, Ar, As, At, Au, Av

- Australian Diver Accreditation Scheme (ADAS) – Australian based international occupational diver accreditation organisation
- Australian In-water Recompression Table – Emergency field treatment for decompression sickness
- Australian Submarine Rescue Vehicle Remora – Diving bell operated by the Australian Navy
- Australian Underwater Federation (AUF) – Governing body for underwater sports
- Auto-dump valve (ADV) – Valve to release excess gas from a dry suit
- Automatic diluent valve (ADV) – Demand valve to maintain volume of a rebreather loop
- Autonomous diver, also known as Autonomous Diver or Autonomous scuba diver – International minimum standard for entry level recreational scuba diver certification
- Autonomous Robotics Ltd – UK company developing an autonomous underwater vehicle
- Autonomous underwater vehicle – Uncrewed underwater vehicle with autonomous guidance system
- AUV-150 – Unmanned underwater vehicle
- AUV Abyss – Autonomous underwater vehicle for mapping of the seabed and water column data collection

=== Av ===
- Avascular necrosis (AVN) – Death of bone tissue due to interruption of the blood supply
- Avelo (diving system) – Variable density scuba buoyancy control system
- Avesta Jernverks AB – Swedish manufacturer of seamless steel gas cylinders

== B ==
Contents: Top	0–9	A	B	C	D	E	F	G	H	I	J	K	L	M	N	O	P	Q	R	S	T	U	V	W	X	Y	Z

Section contents: Top of section, Ba, Be, Bi, Bl, Bo, Br–Bs, Bu–By

=== Ba ===
- Bachrach, Arthur J. – American psychologist and administrator (1923–2011)
- Back flow (plumbing) – Undesirable reversal of flow
- Back gas – Scuba breathing gas carried on the back of the diver
- Back kick (finning) – Finning technique to move backwards
- Back-mounted scuba – Scuba set carried on the diver's back
- Backplate and wing – Type of back-mount scuba harness
- Backscatter – Reflection which reverses the direction of a wave, particle, or signal
- Backup diving equipment – Equipment carried in case of failure of the primary equipment
- Backward kick (finning) – Finning technique to move backwards
- Bagwork (concrete placement) – Method of concrete placement
- Bail-out cylinder, also known as bailout cylinder – Emergency gas supply cylinder carried by a diver
- Bailout (diving) – To switch over to an emergency system during a dive
- Bailout block – Valve block on diver's equipment for switching between main and emergency gas supply
- Bailout bottle – Emergency gas supply cylinder carried by a diver
- Bailout gas – Emergency breathing gas supply carried by the diver
- Bailout rebreather – Diving rebreather carried as an emergency gas supply
- Bailout set – Emergency gas supply scuba carried by a diver
- Bailout system – System to provide emergency breathing gas to a diver
- Bailout to emergency gas supply – Diver switching to backup breathing gas
- Bailout to open circuit, also known as bail out to open circuit – Abort a rebreather dive and surface using open circuit scuba
- Bailout to rebreather – Use of a closed circuit breathing apparatus as an emergency gas supply
- Bailout valve – Valve opening the supply of emergency breathing gas
- Bailout valve (rebreather) – Valve on rebreather mouthpiece to switch to emergency gas supply
- Baited remote underwater video – Automated photography device
- Band mask – Heavy duty full-face diving mask for surface-supplied diving
- Barodontalgia – Tooth pain caused by ambient pressure change
- Barostriction – Obstruction of pressure equalization passages
- Barotrauma – Injury due to pressure difference between gas filled space and adjoining tissue
- Barotrauma of ascent – Injuries caused by a reduction in ambient pressure
- Barotrauma of the ear – Pressure injury to the ears
- Barotraumas of decompression – Injuries caused by a reduction in ambient pressure
- Barton, Otis – American diver and actor (1899–1992)
- Basic Cave Diving: A Blueprint for Survival – Book on cave diving safety by Sheck Exley
- Basic dive boat – Dive boat with minimal facilities
- Basic life support – Emergency medical care by first responder
- Bathyscaphe – Free-diving self-propelled deep-sea submersible

=== Be ===
Section contents: Top of section, Ba, Be, Bi, Bl, Bo, Br–Bs, Bu–By

- Beebe, William – American ornithologist, marine biologist, entomologist, and explorer (1877–1962)
- Behnke, Albert R. – US Navy physician and diving medicine researcher
- Belize Barrier Reef – Series of coral reefs straddling the coast of Belize
- Bell-bounce dive – Surface-oriented diving in a closed bell
- Bell bounce diving – Surface oriented diving using a closed bell
- Bell cursor – Device to guide and control a diving bell near and above the surface
- Bell gas panel – Manifold of hoses and cables provifing services to a diving bell and divers
- Bell handling system – Launch and recovery equipment for a diving bell
- Bell harness – Underwater diving safety haeness
- Bell run – Period when the bell is locked off the saturation system with divers inside under pressure
- Bell stage – Platform below the chamber of a closed diving bell
- Bell umbilical – Bundle of hoses and cables providing services to a diving bell
- Bellman (diver) – Diver working as standby diver and umbilical attendant from a diving bell
- Bellman (diving) – The member of a dive team who acts as stand-by diver and tender from the diving bell
- Bellows counterlung – Type of rebreather volume compensation component
- Benemec Oy – Manufacturer of dive computers
- Benign water – Diving environment with very low risk
- Benign water diving – Diving in environments of low risk
- Bering Sea Gold – Television series
- Bering Sea Gold: Under The Ice – Discovery Channel reality television series
- Bert, Paul – French zoologist, physiologist and politician (1833–1886)
- Beuchat – French manufacturer of underwater diving equipment

=== Bi ===
Section contents: Top of section, Ba, Be, Bi, Bl, Bo, Br–Bs, Bu–By

- Bifin – Swimfin type with single foot pocket
- Bikkers – Dutch manufacturer of standard diving equipment
- Biological hazard – Biological material that poses serious risks to the health of living organisms
- BioMarine – American manufacturer of diving rebreathers

=== Bl ===
Section contents: Top of section, Ba, Be, Bi, Bl, Bo, Br–Bs, Bu–By

- Blackpool decompression tables – Decompression tables for compressed air work
- Black-water (diving) – Oceanic mid-water at night
- Black-water diving – Open ocean mid-water diving at night
- Blackout of ascent – Loss of consciousness caused by cerebral hypoxia on ascending from a deep freedive
- Blauhöhle – Flooded cave system in Southern Germany
- Blood–air barrier – Membrane separating alveolar air from blood in lung capillaries
- A Blueprint for Survival – Book on cave diving safety by Sheck Exley
- Blood shift – Set index article
- Blood shift (diving) – Blood flow to the extremities redistributed to the head and torso during a breathhold dive
- Blood–air barrier – Membrane separating alveolar air from blood in lung capillaries
- Błotniak – One-man wet cabin underwater craft designed in Poland in 1978
- Blowdown (diving) – Pressurisation or dewatering of a diving chamber
- Blue Grotto (Malta) – Sea caverns in Malta
- Blue hole – Marine cavern or sinkhole, open to the surface, in carbonate bedrock
- Blue Hole (New Mexico) – Sinkhole used for scubadiving in New Mexico, United States
- Blue Hole (Red Sea) – Submarine sinkhole north of Dahab, Egypt
- Blue Lake (Utah) – Large geothermal pond in Utah, U.S.
- Blue-water diving, also known as blue water diving – Diving in mid-water where the bottom is out of sight
- Blue-water (diving) – Oceanic mid-water
- Blue-water downline – A weighted line suspended from a floating support in deep water

=== Bo ===
Section contents: Top of section, Ba, Be, Bi, Bl, Bo, Br–Bs, Bu–By

- Boarding stirrup – A suspended step to help divers lift themselves from the water into a boat
- Boat diving – Procedures specific to diving from boats
- Boaty McBoatface – British autonomous underwater vehicle
- Bolt snap – Sprung slide gated snap hook
- Bond, George F. – US Navy physician and diving medicine and saturation diving researcher
- Booster pump – Machine to increase pressure of a fluid
- Bottom gas – Gas breathed during the deep part of a dive
- Bottom time – Elapsed time underwater until th start of ascent to the surface
- Bottom timer – An electronic instrument that records depth and elapsed time data on an underwater dive
- Bounce dive – Non-saturation dive profile with meaning depending on context
- Bounce diving
- Boyle, Robert – Anglo-Irish scientist (1627–1691)
- Boyle's law – Relation between gas pressure and volume

=== Br–Bs ===
Section contents: Top of section, Ba, Be, Bi, Bl, Bo, Br–Bs, Bu–By

- Bradner, Hugh – American physicist, neoprene wetsuit inventor (1915–2008)
- Braile, also known as brail (diving)
- Brazilian commando frogmen – GRUMEC is the special forces unit of the Brazilian Navy
- Breaking wave, also known as surf – Unstable wave
- Breastplate (diving), also known as corselet (diving) – Lower part of a heavy diving helmet
- Breath-hold blackout – Loss of consciousness caused by cerebral hypoxia towards the end of a breath-hold dive
- Breathing – Process of moving air in and out of the lungs
- Breathing air – Air quality suitable for safe breathing
- Breathing air compressor – Machine that compresses atmospheric air at breathing gas quality
- Breathing apparatus – Equipment allowing or assisting the user to breathe in a hostile environment
- Breathing gas – Gas used for human respiration
- Breathing gas analysis – Detection and measurement of components of a breathing gas
- Breathing gas density – Factor influencing work of breathing
- Breathing gas mixture – Mixture of gases suitable for human respiration
- Breathing gas quality – Purity requirements for gases for human breathing
- Breathing gas reclaim system – Equipment to recover helium based breathing gas after use by divers
- Breathing gas regulator – Mechanism to control the pressure of a breathing gas
- Breathing gas sharing – Provision of breathing gas by another diver
- Breathing gas switch – Changing between breathing gasses of different composition while diving
- Breathing loop – Breathing gas circuit in a rebreather
- Breathing performance of regulators, also known as breathing regulator performance – Capacity of breathing regulators to function as specified
- Breathing regulator – Mechanism to control the pressure of a breathing gas
- Breathing set – Equipment allowing or assisting the user to breath in a hostile environment
- Breathing tube (breathing apparatus) – Tube through which to breath ambient pressure air
- Briggs Marine – Marine services company based in the United Kingdom
- British commando frogmen – Special Boat Service, whose members are drawn largely from the Royal Marines
- British Divers Marine Life Rescue – United Kingdom charity organisation
- British Freediving Association (BFA) – British affiliate to AIDA International
- British Octopush Association (BOA) – National body for underwater hockey in the United Kingdom
- British Sub-Aqua Club (BSAC) – UK governing body of recreational diving
- British Underwater Sports Association (BUSA) – National sporting association
- Brubakk, Alf O. – Norwegian decompression researcher (1941–2022)
- BRUVS, short for Baited Remote Underwater Video System
- BSAC First Class Diver – Recreational diver competent to lead a group of divers carrying out a project
- BSAC London Branch – Original British Sub-Aqua Club branch

=== Bu–By ===
Section contents: Top of section, Ba, Be, Bi, Bl, Bo, Br–Bs, Bu–By

- Bubble decompression model – Decompression models based on limiting growth of bubble nuclei
- Buddy bottle – Alternative name for scuba bailout set
- Buddy breathing – Technique for sharing breathing gas from a single mouthpiece
- Buddy check – Pre-dive safety checks carried out by two-diver dive teams
- Buddy diver – Person diving by the buddy system
- Buddy diving – Practice of mutual monitoring and assistance between two divers
- Buddy line – A tether between two scuba divers to prevent separation in low visibility
- Buddy separation – Situation where dive buddies are not close enough to communicate
- Buddy separation procedure – Standard procedure for dive buddy separation
- Bühlmann, Albert A. – Swiss physician and decompression researcher (1923–1994)
- Bühlmann decompression algorithm, also known as Buhlmann algorithm – Mathematical model of tissue inert gas uptake and release with pressure change
- Bühlmann decompression model – Mathematical model of tissue inert gas uptake and release with pressure change
- Bühlmann decompression tables – Decompression tables based on Bühlmann;s decompression model
- Built-in breathing set – System for supply of breathing gas on demand within a confined space
- Built-in breathing system (BIBS) – System for supply of breathing gas on demand within a confined space
- Built-in breathing system regulator – Hyperbaric chamber breathing regulators that exhaust externally
- Buoyancy – Upward force that opposes the weight of an object immersed in fluid
- Buoyancy compensator (BCD), also known as buoyancy control device – Equipment for controlling the buoyancy of a diver
- Buoyancy compensator inflation hose – Inflation gas supply hose on scuba regulator
- Buoyancy control (disambiguation)
- Buoyancy control in scuba diving, also known as buoyancy control (scuba), or buoyancy control (scuba diving) – Essential safety skill
- Buoyancy control equipment – Diving equipment primarily intended to modify buoyancy of the diver
- Buoyancy control skills – Skills of maintaining neutral buoyancy on scuba
- Buoyancy control with a rebreather – Closed circuit scuba diving skill
- Buoyancy engine – Device that alters a body's buoyancy to provide propulsion
- Buoyant ascent – Type of emergency ascent in diving
- Buoyant tethered ascent, also known as Emergency tethered ascent – Positive buoyancy emergency ascent using a reel upline
- Burst disc, also known as rupture disc – Non-closing over-pressure relief device
- Byford Dolphin – Semi-submersible offshore drilling rig
- Byford Dolphin diving bell accident – Explosive decompression of an occupied saturation chamber

== C ==
Contents: Top	0–9	A	B	C	D	E	F	G	H	I	J	K	L	M	N	O	P	Q	R	S	T	U	V	W	X	Y	Z

Section contents: Top of section, Ca–Cc, Ce–Cg, Ch, Ci, Cl, Cm, Co, Cr, Cu, Cy

=== Ca–Cc ===
- Caisson (engineering) – Rigid structure to provide workers with a dry working environment below water level
- Caisson gauge – High precision pressure gauge for pressure vessels for human occupancy
- California Advisory Committee on Scientific and Technical Diving – Precursor to the American Academy of Underwater Sciences
- Cam band, also known as camband, cam strap, or camstrap – Strap with locking buckle to hold scuba cylinder on BCD harness
- Canadian Armed Forces Divers – Underwater divers employed by any of the Canadian armed forces
- Canister light – Dive light with battery pack and light head connected by cable
- Canoe and kayak diving – Recreational diving from a canoe or kayak
- Canoe diving – Recreational diving from a canoe
- Capernwray Dive Centre – Flooded quarry in Lancashire, England, used as a recreational dive site
- Carbon dioxide retention – Abnormally high tissue carbon dioxide levels
- Carbon dioxide scrubber – Device which absorbs carbon dioxide from circulated gas
- Carbon dioxide scrubbing reaction – Chemical reactions that remove carbon dioxide from air
- Carbon monoxide poisoning – Toxic effects of carbon monoxide
- Carleton CDBA – Military rebreather by Cobham plc
- Carmellan Research – British manufacturer of diving rebreathers
- Cascade filling – Efficient system of filling from multiple gas storage cylinders
- Cascade filling system – Filling pressurized gas from a series of storage cylinders
- Cascade storage system – High pressure gas storage system set up for cascade filling
- Catalina Cylinders – American manufacturer of aluminum gas cylinders
- Catastrophic dry suit flooding – Major leak of water into a dry suit
- Caustic cocktail – Mixture of water and strong alkali components from a flooded rebreather scrubber
- Cavalero-Champion – French manufacturer of underwater diving equipment
- Cave Divers Association of Australia (CDAA) – Australian cave diving organisation
- Cave diving – Diving in water-filled caves
- Cave Diving Group (CDG) – UK based cave diver training and certification agency
- Cave diving helmet – Impact protection equipment worn on the head
- Cave diving regions – Geographical distribution of cave diving venues
- Cave diving regions of the world – Regions of the world where known cave diving venues exist
- Cave line – Line used for navigation in flooded caves
- Cave reel – Line holder used to lay and recover guideline in caves
- Cavern diver – Certification for diving under a natural overhead within the zone of natural light
- Cavern diving – Diving in the part of a cave where the exit is visible by natural light
- C-card – Certification as competent to dive to a specified standard

=== Ce–Cg ===
Section contents: Top of section, Ca–Cc, Ce–Cg, Ch, Ci, Cl, Cm, Co, Cr, Cu, Cy

- C.E. Heinke & Co. Ltd. – British manufacturer of diving equipment
- CEJN connector – Type of quick connector for dry suit inflation gas
- Cenote – Natural pit or sinkhole that exposes groundwater underneath
- Center for Maritime Archaeology and Conservation – Academic centre at Texas A&M University
- Central nervous system oxygen toxicity – Adverse effects of exposure to a high partial pressure of oxygen
- Cerberus (sonar) – Diver detection device
- CGA 850 connector system – US standard connector between scuba regulator and cylinder valve

=== Ch ===
Section contents: Top of section, Ca–Cc, Ce–Cg, Ch, Ci, Cl, Cm, Co, Cr, Cu, Cy

- Chain cable – Use of chain for anchoring a ship
- HMS Challenger K07 – Royal Navy saturation diving support vessel
- Chamber operation – Operation of a hyperbaric chamber in support of underwater diving
- Chamber operator – A person who operates a diving chamber
- Charging pressure – Rated pressure for filling a pressurised gas container
- Charles's law – Relationship between volume and temperature of a gas at constant pressure
- Chase boat – A tender generally not carried by the main vessel
- Checklist – Aide-memoire to ensure consistency and completeness in carrying out a task
- Checkout dive – Short dive to test a skill or equipment
- Chemical hazard – Non-biological hazards of hazardous materials
- Chief of safety – Supervisor of the safety team at a freediving competition
- Christmas tree ladder – Ladder with rungs cantilevered from a central rail
- Chronic dysbaric disorder – Injury caused by long term or multiple exposure to pressure variation
- Chronic oxygen toxicity – Effects of long term exposure to high oxygen concentration

=== Ci ===
Section contents: Top of section, Ca–Cc, Ce–Cg, Ch, Ci, Cl, Cm, Co, Cr, Cu, Cy

- Circular search – Procedure for finding underwater targets
- Circulatory system – Organ system for circulating blood in animals
- Cis-Lunar – Manufacturer of electronically controlled closed-circuit rebreathers for scuba diving
- Civil liability in recreational diving – Legal duty of care, negligence and liability in recreational diving

=== Cl ===
Section contents: Top of section, Ca–Cc, Ce–Cg, Ch, Ci, Cl, Cm, Co, Cr, Cu, Cy

- Clarke, John R. – American scientist and underwater breathing apparatus authority
- Classification of underwater activities – Classification of underwater diving activities by occupational field
- Cleaning and disinfection of personal diving equipment – Prevention of infection by shared or contaminated equipment
- Clearance diver – Navy diver specialised in explosives
- Clearance Divers Life Support Equipment (CDLSE) – British military electronically controlled closed circuit rebreather
- Clearance diving – Military diving work involving underwater demolition and work with explosives
- Clearance Diving Branch (RAN) – Diving unit of the Royal Australian Navy
- Clearing a diving mask – Removing water from a flooded mask underwater
- Clip-on weight – Small weights used to make fine adjustments to a diver's ballast
- Clipperton In-water Recompression Tables – Protocol for treating decompression sickness
- Close call – Incident that could have caused harm
- Closed bell – Hyperbaric chamber for transporting divers vertically through the water
- Closed bell decompression – Decompression in the personnel transfer capsule
- Closed bell emergency procedures – Standard procedures for use in common surface-supplied closed bell diving emergencies
- Closed circuit breathing apparatus, also known as closed-circuit breathing apparatus – Apparatus to recycle breathing gas
- Closed circuit diving – Diving using recycled breathing gas
- Closed-circuit rebreather, also known as Closed circuit rebreather – Breathing apparatus
- Closed circuit rebreather set point – Settings for maximum and minimum allowable oxygen partial pressure
- Closed circuit scuba – Self contained underwater breathing apparatus which recycles exhaled breathing gas
- Closed circuit bailout – Emergency gas supply from an independent closed circuit rebreather
- Closed-circuit oxygen rebreather – Apparatus to recycle breathing gas
- Closed diving bell – Hyperbaric chamber for transporting divers vertically through the water
- Closed lift bag – Inflatable buoyancy bag with overpressure valve
- Clump weight – A heavy weight suspended on cable used to guide a diving bell

=== Cm ===
Section contents: Top of section, Ca–Cc, Ce–Cg, Ch, Ci, Cl, Cm, Co, Cr, Cu, Cy

- CMAS* scuba diver, also known as CMAS one-star scuba diver – Entry level recreational diving certification from CMAS
- CMAS** scuba diver, also known as CMAS two-star scuba diver or CMAS** Diver – Autonomous recreational scuba diving certification
- CMAS*** scuba diver, also known as CMAS three-star diver – Fully trained and experienced recreational diver
- CMAS**** scuba diver, also known as CMAS four-star diver – A three-star diver with a high level of competence and broad experience
- CMAS Europe – Non-profit branch of the world underwater federation representing European affiliates
- CMAS Scientific Committee – Committee of the World Underwater Federation
- CMAS Two Star Instructor – CMAS instructor certified to train all core levels of diver
- CMAS Three Star Instructor – CMAS diving instructor trainer
- CMAS Instructors of South Africa (CMAS-ISA) – Member federation of CMAS for South Africa

=== Co ===
Section contents: Top of section, Ca–Cc, Ce–Cg, Ch, Ci, Cl, Cm, Co, Cr, Cu, Cy

- Coastal dive site – Sites in the sea near the coastline
- Cochran Undersea Technology – American manufacturer of dive computers
- Code of practice – Set of rules regarding behavior of people working in a particular occupation
- Code of Practice for Scientific Diving (UNESCO) – Principles for the safe practice of diving for science
- Code of Practice for Scientific Diving: Principles for the Safe Practice of Scientific Diving in Different Environments – Document published by UNESCO
- Cold shock response – Physiological response to sudden exposure to cold
- Cold-water diving – Underwater diving in water that is cold enough to require special equipment
- Comando Raggruppamento Subacquei e Incursori Teseo Tesei – Italian special forces diving unit
- Combat Rubber Raiding Craft – Rubberised fabric tactical inflatable boat used by the US Navy
- Combat sidestroke – Variation of side-stroke swimming used by United States Navy SEALs
- Combined gas law – Combination of Charles', Boyle's and Gay-Lussac's gas laws
- Comex Therapeutic Table CX 12 – Recompression protocol for treasing decompression sickness
- Comex Therapeutic Table 18C – Recompression protocol for treating decompression sickness
- Comex Therapeutic Table 18L – Recompression protocol for treating decompression sickness
- Comex therapeutic table CX 30, also known as Comex 30 table – A hyperbaric treatment schedule developed by Comex
- Comex Therapeutic Table CX 30A – Recompression protocol for treating decompression sickness
- Comex Therapeutic Table CX 30AL – Recompression protocol for treating decompression sickness
- Comhairle Fo-Thuinn (CFT) – Governing body for recreational diving and underwater hockey in Ireland
- Commando Hubert – Combat swimmer unit of the French Navy
- Commandos Marine – Special operations forces of the French Navy
- Commandos Military Unit, also known as Jednostka Wojskowa Komandosów (JWK) – Polish special operations unit
- Commercial diver – Trained and registered professional diver
- Commercial diver registration in South Africa
- Commercial diver training – Processes by which people learn to dive safely for industrial applications
- Commercial diving – Professional diving on industrial projects
- Commercial diving school – Place where commercial diving skills are trained and assessed
- Commercial offshore diver – Professional diver working offshore
- Commercial offshore diving – Professional diving in support of the oil and gas industry
- Communications panel – Surface control panel for underwater diving voice communications system
- Compagnie maritime d'expertises – French offshore diving contractor
- Compass grid search – Technique for finding underwater targets
- Compass search – Search patterns controlled by compass directions
- Competence (human resources) – Ability of a person to do a job properly
- Competitive apnea – Competitive breathhold diving
- Competitive freediving – Breathold diving competition disciplines
- Competitive spearfishing – Hunting of fish underwater on breath-hold using a hand-loaded spear
- Composite-Beat Engel – Swiss manufacturer of composite helmets
- Compressed air – Air under a pressure greater than atmospheric
- Compressed air worker – Person who works where the ambient air pressure is greater than atmospheric
- Compressed Gas Association (CGA) – American trade association for industrial and medical gas industries
- Compressed-gas diving – Diving where ambient pressure gas is breathed during the dive
- Compression arthralgia – Joint pain caused by fast compression to high ambient pressure
- Compressor diving – Crude mode of surface-supplied air diving
- Compressor operator – Person competent to operate a diving air compressor
- Concentration – Ratio of part of a mixture to the whole
- Concentration gradient – Variation of concentration of a component of a mixture over distance
- Confédération Mondiale des Activités Subaquatiques (CMAS) – International organisation for underwater activities
- Confined water (diving) – A diving environment that is enclosed and bounded sufficiently for safe training
- Confined water diving – Diving in water which is enclosed and limited in extent
- Conrad Limbaugh Award for Scientific Diving Leadership – Annual award of the AAUS for contribution in scientific diving safety and leadership
- Conservatism (diving) – Approach to risk reduction for decompression
- Conservative decompression – Decompression practices of reduced risk
- Constant flow breathing apparatus – Equipment providing a constant flow of breathing gas
- Constant flow regulator – Gas pressure control regulator which provides a calibrated output
- Constant mass flow regulator – Gas pressure regulator with a constant mass flow delivery
- Constant oxygen fraction diving – Technique of underwater diving
- Constant partial pressure mode – Decompression computation assuming constant oxygen partial pressure
- Constant weight apnea – Freediving discipline
- Constant weight bi-fins – Competitive freediving discipline
- Constant weight without fins – Freediving discipline
- Contaminated water – Water containing high levels of hazardous materials
- Contaminated water diving – Occupational diving in contaminated water
- Continental Shelf Station Two – Undersea research habitat in the Red Sea
- Contingency plan – Plan in case something unexpected occurs
- Continuous blending and compression – Gas blending by constant flow mixing and analysis
- Continuous decompression – Decompression without specific stops at given depths
- Continuous flow breathing apparatus – Equipment providing a constant flow of breathing gas
- Continuous guide line, also known as continuous guideline – Cord that can lead a scuba diver to open water
- Contraindications for hyperbaric medicine – Reasons to avoid therapeutic compression
- Controlled buoyant lift – A technique used by scuba divers to raise an incapacitated diver to the surface
- Controlled emergency swimming ascent (CESA) – Emergency procedure for scuba divers when out of air
- Coral reef – Outcrop of rock in the sea formed by the growth and deposit of stony coral skeletons
- Coral Reef Alliance – Non-profit, environmental NGO focused on protecting coral reefs
- Coral reef protection – Modifying human activities to reduce impact on coral reefs
- Correct scuba weighting – Weighting for scuba diving which works best most of the time
- Corselet (diving helmet) – Part of a diving helmet supported by the shoulders
- Cosmos CE2F series – Italian swimmer delivery vehicles
- Counterlung – Volume compensating device in a rebreather

=== Cr ===
Section contents: Top of section, Ca–Cc, Ce–Cg, Ch, Ci, Cl, Cm, Co, Cr, Cu, Cy

- Cracking pressure – Pressure difference over the diaphragm needed to open a demand valve
- Cramp – Pathological, often painful, involuntary muscle contraction
- Cressi-Sub – Italian manufacturer of water sports equipment
- Crewed submersible – Small watercraft able to navigate under water
- Crew resource management – Air crew communication and decision-making training
- Critical flicker fusion frequency – Concept in the psychophysics of vision
- Critical pressure for the dive profile – Minimum safe pressure to start a planned dive profile
- Critical pressure of ascent – Minimum safe gas pressure to start ascent from a given depth and time to surface
- Critical pressure of descent – Minimum safe pressure to start a planned dive profile
- Critical pressure of exit – Minimum safe pressure to turn a penetration dive
- Critical pressure of turnaround – Minimum safe pressure to turn a penetration dive
- Critical pressure (scuba) – Breathing gas minimum safe pressure for starting specified activity
- Cross altitude corrections, also known as Cross corrections – Adjustments to the US Navy decompression tables to allow for altitude
- Cryogenic rebreather – Rebreather that removes CO2 by freezing it out using heat exchange with liquid oxygen

=== Cu ===
Section contents: Top of section, Ca–Cc, Ce–Cg, Ch, Ci, Cl, Cm, Co, Cr, Cu, Cy

- CUMA – Canadian military diving rebreather
- Current (hydrology) – Directional flow in a water body
- Current shear – Variation of flow rate transverse to flow direction
- Current (stream) – Flow of water in a natural watercourse due to gravity
- CURV – Early remotely operated underwater vehicle

=== Cy ===
Section contents: Top of section, Ca–Cc, Ce–Cg, Ch, Ci, Cl, Cm, Co, Cr, Cu, Cy

- Cylinder band – Straps to clamp two scuba cylinders together
- Cylinder pressure gauge – Instrument for measuring gas pressure in a storage cylinder
- Cylinder valve (disambiguation)

Contents: Top	0–9	A	B	C	D	E	F	G	H	I	J	K	L	M	N	O	P	Q	R	S	T	U	V	W	X	Y	Z

== See also ==
- Glossary of underwater diving terminology
