= Data Mask =

Data Mask or similar may mean:

- In computer science, "data mask" is another name for mask (computing), a bit pattern used to extract information from another bit pattern
- The Date Mask is a diving mask with a built-in LED display made by Oceanic (scuba gear makers)
