= Cressi-Sub =

Italian manufacturer of water sports equipment

Cressi Sub SpA
- Type: Private
- Founded: 1946
- Founder: Egidio Cressi and Nanni Cressi
- Headquarters: Genoa, Italy
- Area served: Worldwide
- Website: www.cressi.it

Cressi is one of the largest manufacturers of water sports equipment in the world serving the scuba dive, snorkel and swim industries. The company's five divisions cover four markets—scuba diving, snorkeling, spearfishing, and swimming. Cressi maintains a significant presence in each major economic region around the globe and delivers some 300 distinct products to more than 90 countries. Formerly Cressi-Sub, the Italian company was founded by two brothers, Egidio and Nanni Cressi in 1946 in Genoa, Italy. Still family owned and operated, the company is headed today by Antonio Cressi and its headquarters and manufacturing facilities remain in Genoa.

The Cressi name has been associated with diving, especially spearfishing, since the earliest days of the sport. Egidio and Nanni Cressi began producing masks and spearguns by hand in 1938. Their products were made for the emerging spearfishing community along the northern Mediterranean coast. Since then the company has remained an integral part of the diving community and Cressi-sponsored athletes have won 12 world spearfishing titles. Product innovation for scuba divers have also been significant, including the first open-heel adjustable dive fin and the first diving mask with a dedicated nose pocket. Today Cressi is one of only a few companies in the world that manufactures a full line of equipment and accessories for each of its markets.

== Divisions ==
Swimming Cressi has a long history in the recreational swimming market. It first introduced the Nuoto swim goggles in the 1950s and today offers a full line of nearly 40 products for both recreational and competitive swimmers. Notable is that in all models Cressi Swim products use professional-grade materials, namely silicone for skirts and seals and shatterproof glass lenses. The company offers two dozen models of swim masks and goggles in a wide range of styles, including several models for children. Other products include a range of accessories such as short fins, hand-held paddles and gloves for training, suits and swim caps.

Snorkeling As with eyewear products made for the swimming market, all Cressi diving and snorkel masks incorporate glass lenses and silicone skirts. The company has pioneered a number of design, material and manufacturing innovations for swimfins. These include classic full-foot fins with paddle-style blades as well as unique adjustable, open-heel fins made for use with bare feet. More than 30 masks, fins and snorkels are available and targeted to the snorkeling market.

Spearfishing Egidio and Nanni Cressi first founded the Cressi company to service the growing sport of spearfishing, and the Cressi name has been associated with the sport ever since. Cressi-sponsored athletes have won 12 world spearfishing titles in that time and the company offers an extensive line of both spearguns and accessories. These include eight models of pneumatic and band-powered guns, 14 low-volume masks, seven models of freediving fins and a wide range of accessories. In total, the company offers more than 80 spearfishing-specific products, from reels to shafts to camouflage dive suits.

Scuba Diving Cressi's offerings in the scuba diving market include every category of dive equipment. These include masks, fins, snorkels, buoyancy compensators, regulators and accessories. Nearly all of these products are both designed and manufactured at the Cressi facilities in Genova, Italy. Cressi has also expanded its manufacturing capability to include electronics and subsequently introduced the Leonardo computer, the first dive computer fully designed and built by the company.

Divesuits Cressi dive wear stands as a separate division within the company and includes more than 30 styles of wetsuits, dive skins and rash guards. These include diving and general watersports styles as well as specialty designs for freedivers and camouflage models for use in spearfishing. As part of this product division, the company also produces a wide range of bags and luggage accessories aimed at the diving and water sports markets.

== Location ==
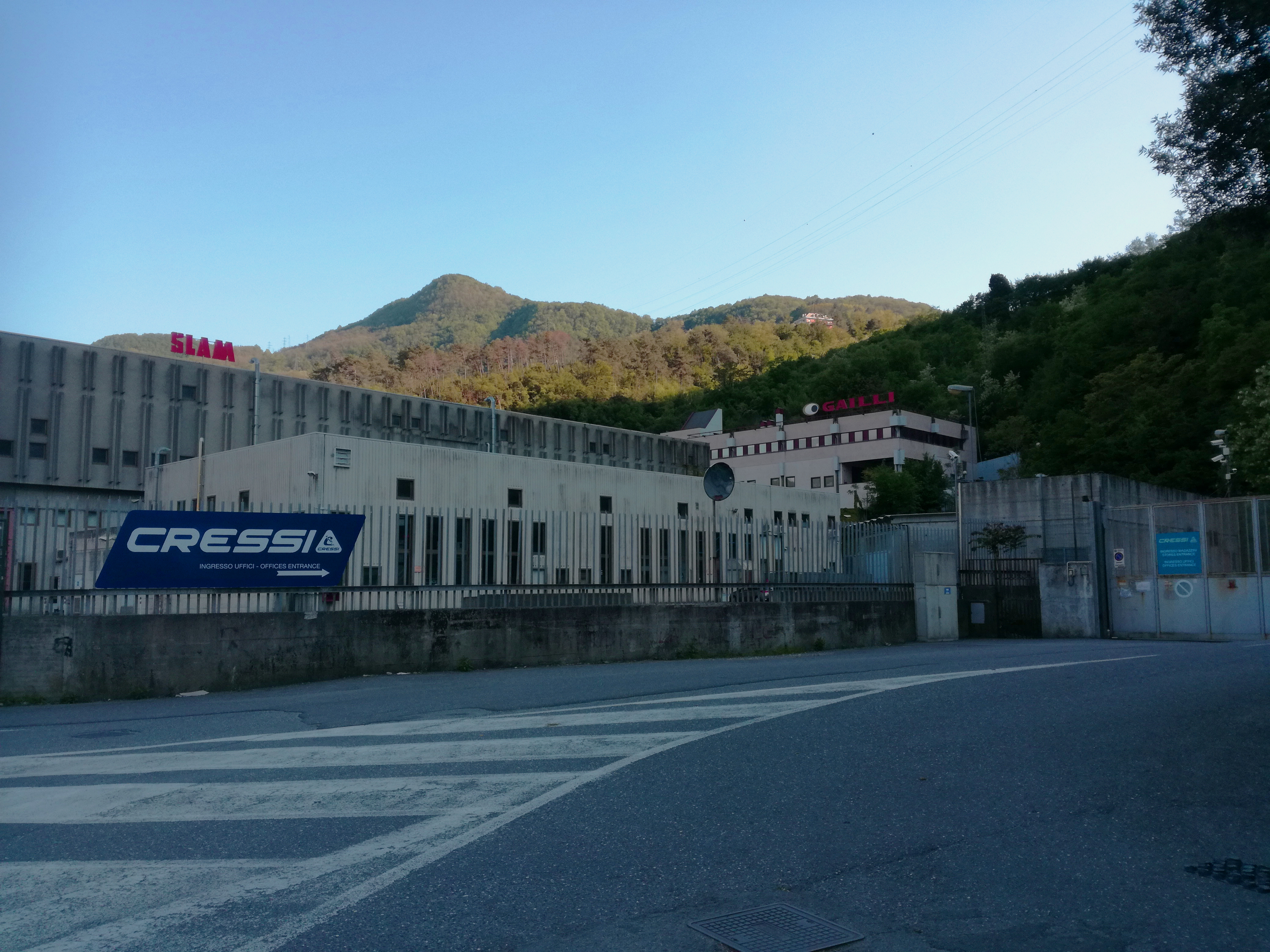
Cressi Sub headquarter in Genoa

Cressi's offices and production facilities remain in Genoa, Italy where the company was founded in 1946. This location on the northern shore of the Mediterranean is significant to the company's historical success and current activities. Historically, the region is the birthplace of modern diving. In the early 20th century, spearfishing began to emerge in its present form and some of the first efforts at crafting masks, fins, spearguns—even mechanical breathing devices—came from the area. Today, a majority of scuba diving's most prominent brands can trace their roots to this region, and it remains the “Silicon Valley of the diving world.” Practically, Cressi's location in Genova has also provided it with ready access to the shores of the Mediterranean and allowed the company to maintain a strong tradition of product design and testing that involves evaluations in real world conditions.

== Brands ==
Aer-Sub and Spiro-Sub are trademarks used by Cressi-sub.

== Manufacturing ==
Cressi manufacturing facilities in Genoa include more than 16,000 square meters of roofed space and incorporate design and production facilities for each of its product lines. Significant investments in equipment and technology have allowed the company to expand its manufacturing capabilities, with very few of the company's products manufactured off-site. The company says this helps it maintain tight quality control standards and gives it an edge over competitors that outsource production.

Cressi production facilities include a pair of ANSTI breathing machines used in the development and testing of scuba regulators. It has developed a production technology that allows for the simultaneous molding of up to three materials at once. This has led to the use of multi-material design in dive fins and advances in producing dive and swim masks. Cressi's expanded electronics manufacturing also gives it the capability to produce a wide range of electrical components and has also resulted in the first completely in-house design and production of a dive computer, the Leonardo.

== Product Innovations ==
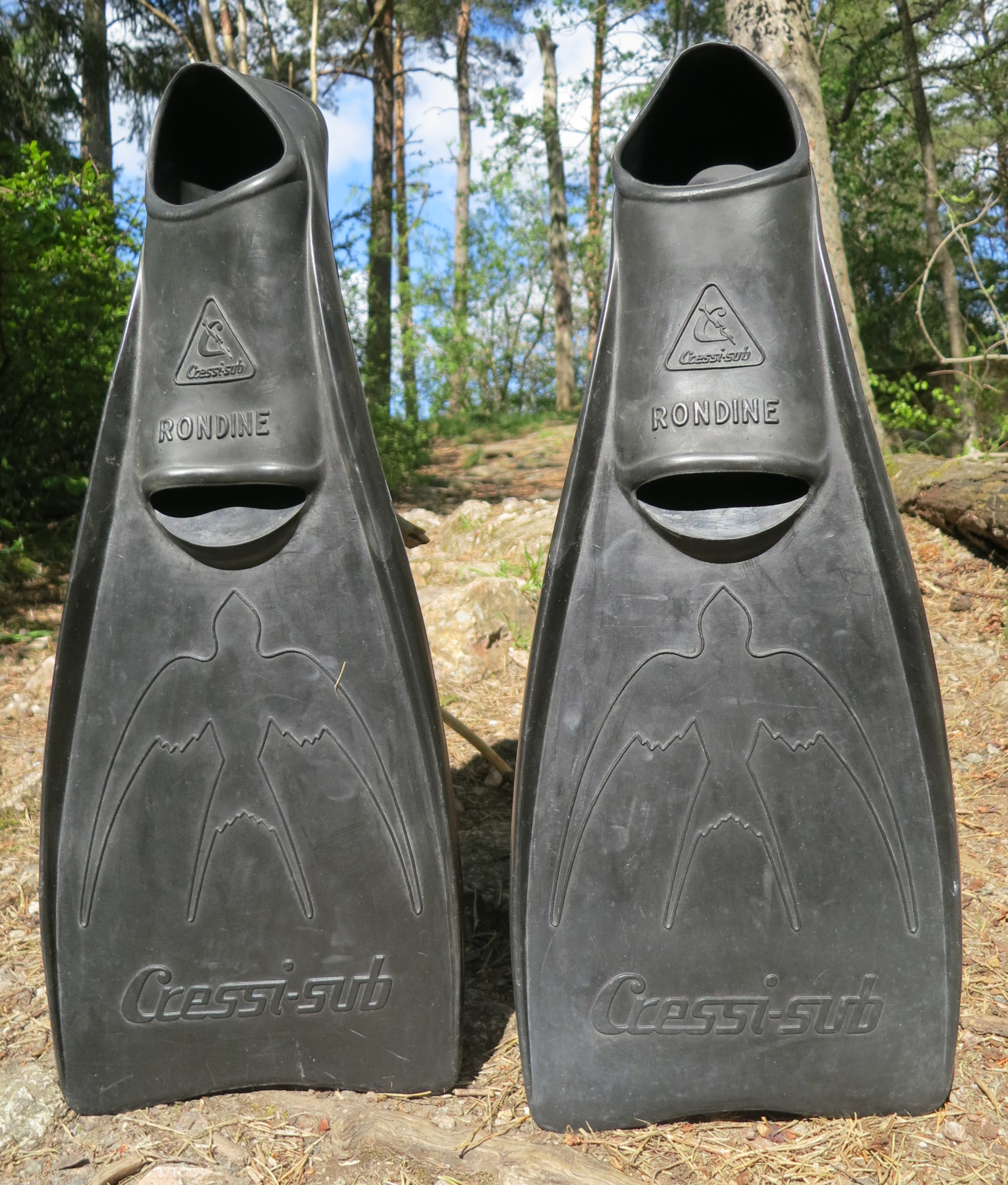
The Cressi-Sub Rondine fins

1943 – Sirena Mask: The first mask offered by the Cressi company, the design remained available for 30 years.

1952 – Pinocchio Mask: The first dive mask with a dedicated nose pocket, making it possible for divers to clear water from the mask, and equalize the mask during descent.

1953 – Rondine Fins: Revolutionary features included a tilted blade, strong side reinforcements, and an upper opening for the toes. It was a major advance in both comfort and performance and the basic design elements of the Rondine are still easily recognized in modern dive fins.

1965 – Polaris 4 Regulator: Known for its extreme reliability, this regulator employed a compact piston first stage and chrome brass second stage.

1967 – Pinocchio Vi. Erre (reduced volume) Mask: Introduced a new kind of accentuated V-shape frame. The benefit was greatly reduced internal volume, making the mask more comfortable to wear and much easier to clear when flooded.

1970 – Rondine L long Fin: Extended length blades in the Rondine L were ideal for freediving and spearfishing. These fins were used by Jacques Mayol to set multiple freediving records.

1979 – Rondine Gara: This long freediving fin introduced a new material, nylon, to the fin market and proved to offer better performance.

1983 – Galaxie F1 Regulator: A new high-performance design that used an “injection system” for maximum air delivery during times of high demand.

1988 – Equidive BCD: An innovative jacket-style buoyancy compensator gave divers a more comfortable harness system and improved durability.

2000 – Big Eyes Mask: A new tear-drop lens shape and raked lens position significantly improved field-of-view for divers while also further reducing internal volume for easier clearing.

2004 – Ellipse Regulators: Resulting in multiple new design patents, these regulators benefit from the natural mechanical advantage of a larger diaphragm in the second stage, a fold-out design for easier maintenance, computer designed regulator lever and an internal heat exchanger for use in cold water.

2008 – The Flex-in-the-Sea BCD: First introduced to the European market and now also available in America, this model helped pioneer a new market of lightweight travel BCs.

2009 – Palau SAF and Action Short Fins: Compact fins used for multiple water sports, such as snorkeling and body boarding, these fins incorporated an adjustable, open-heel foot pocket suitable for use with bare feet.

2010 – Air Travel BCD: The first of the extremely compact fold-up buoyancy compensators suitable for carry-on luggage in air travel.

2011 – XS Compact Regulators: Extremely lightweight materials and compact second stage are ideal for travel.

2011 – Crystal Silicone: Used in select mask models, this new material improves upon silicone used for three decades in mask skirts with improved light transmission and much greater resistance to discoloration.
