= Bailout valve =

A Bailout valve in underwater diving is a valve switching the breathing gas supply from the primary source to an emergency source.

- Rebreather diving#Bailout valve, a rebreather bailout valve is a valve in the mouthpiece that switches from closed to open circuit.
- Surface-supplied diving#Bailout gas supply, in surface-supplied diving, a bailout valve is a valve on the helmet, full-face mask or bailout block on the diving harness that switches from surface-supplied gas to scuba gas.
