= Advanced diver =

Advanced diver is a context sensitive term applied to various levels of recreational and professional diver competence and certification, usually with some other qualification indicating the general field of diving to which it is used as a comparative term:

- Advanced Open Water Diver, recreational scuba diving certification slightly above minimum entry level
- Advanced European Scientific Diver, professional diving certification for a diver competent to organise a scientific diving team
- Advanced nitrox diver, technical diving qualification to use multiple mixtures of oxygen enriched air during a dive with obligatory decompression
- Advanced trimix diver, recreational technical diving certification to use hypoxic trimix
