= Cylinder valve =

Cylinder valve can refer to

- an inlet or exhaust valve in a piston engine or compressor
- a direct coupled valve to control the flow of gas into or out of a gas storage cylinder
  - a scuba cylinder valve to control the flow of gas into or out of the diving cylinders of a scuba set
- a valve to control flow of the actuating fluid into or out of a hydraulic or pneumatic cylinder
