= Oceanic Worldwide =

American recreational scuba equipment manufacturer

Oceanic
- Company type: Private
- Industry: Scuba equipment manufacturing
- Genre: Diving equipment
- Founded: 1972
- Founder: Bob Hollis
- Headquarters: San Leandro, California, United States
- Products: Dive computers, rebreathers
- Owner: Huish Outdoors
- Website: www.oceanicworldwide.com

Oceanic is an American manufacturer of scuba gear. It was founded by Bob Hollis in 1972 and is based in San Leandro, California, United States. Its products include dive computers, rebreathers and a novel diving mask incorporating a heads-up-display of information.

== History ==
In 1972, Robert Hollis founded the parent company American Underwater Products which did business as Oceanic.

Aeris, Originally also a brand of American Underwater Products, founded in 1998, was merged with Oceanic in 2014. The Aeris brand covered a wide range of recreational scuba equipment, including regulators, dive computers, buoyancy compensators, harnesses, masks, fins, and snorkels.

In 2017, Huish Outdoors acquired the Oceanic and Hollis brands from AUP.

== Products ==
=== Rebreathers ===
They developed the Phibian CCS50 and CCS100 rebreathers; Stuart Clough of Undersea Technologies developed the Phibian's electronics package. With its purpose-built training facility, Oceanic UK working closely with American Divers International, developed and delivered by both Stuart Clough and Paul Morrall training and familiarisation courses.

They have developed military rebreathers for use by frogmen and naval work divers, for example the US Navy MK-25 and the MK-16 mixed-gas rebreather.

=== Data mask ===
Oceanic developed the first HUD style mask, which is an eyes-and-nose diving mask with a built-in LCD, commercially known as a DataMask, capable of providing various dive data from an on-board diving computer.

=== Dive computers ===
Oceanic manufactures several dive computers for recreational divers. Oceanic's computer division Pelagic Pressure Systems was sold to Aqua Lung in 2015.

- OC1, OCi
- VT 4.1
- Atom 3.1
- Geo 2.0 Wrist Computer
- VEO 1.0, 2.0, 3.0
- B.U.D. Back up dive computer

=== Wetsuit for a penguin ===
The company developed, in early 2008, a custom wetsuit for an alpha-male African penguin at Steinhart Aquarium who was suffering from problems maintaining core body temperature due to feather loss.
