= Scuba diving therapy =

Treatment using scuba diving activities

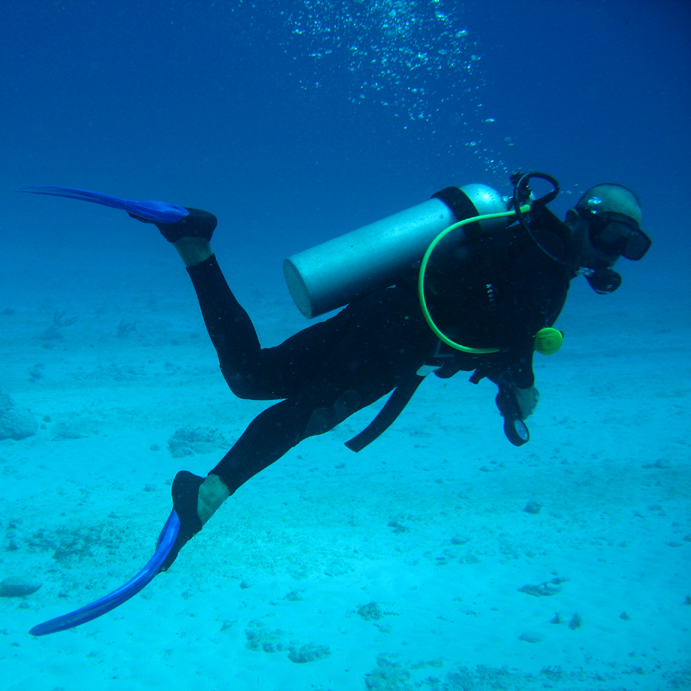
Open Water Scuba Diving

Scuba diving therapy is a type of treatment that consists of a variety of scuba diving activities and exercises. Essential elements are increased body awareness, social bonding, and breathing techniques. The goal is to help rehabilitate individuals with physical, cognitive, and psychological disabilities.

Scuba diving therapy has been shown to reduce levels of anxiety, PTSD, depression, insomnia and an abatement in social dysfunction and depression. Benefits are particularly observed in military veterans and those with physical or cognitive disabilities. Primary therapeutic features include camaraderie, hydrostatic pressure, deep breathing exercises, and underwater immersion to stimulate relaxation and regulate daily stressors.

Scuba diving is generally considered to be a high performance adventurous recreational activity that requires a multitude of safety precautions. Scuba diving therapy and rehabilitation relies on extensive stimulation of the entire human body.

== Types ==
=== Recreational diving as therapy ===
As with other recreational activities, freediving and scuba-diving can provide immersive experiences that can help to reduce stress. A study by Marlinge et al. (2019) has shown that scuba diving helped to promote relaxation which can lower levels of multiple stress markers like cortisol, copeptin and ischemia-modified albumin (IMA) levels. Additionally, researchers from the Johns Hopkins University of Medicine found scuba diving to result in a significant improvement of PTSD symptoms, with a reduction of muscle spasticity by an average of 15%.

=== Adaptive diving ===
Adaptive scuba diving is scuba diving by people with disabilities using techniques modified to allow the diver to participate as independently as their abilities allow. Learners are assessed according to their ability to perform each necessary skill-set. Adaptations to procedures are made during training as applicable. It is possible that an adaptive diver may be certified at the same level as an able-bodied diver, but where this is not possible they may be certified to dive with a specially trained dive buddy or buddies who can provide necessary assistance for acceptable safety.

Adaptive diving is an acceptably safe form of diving that helps people with amputations and other disabilities to dive as independently as reasonably practicable. The practical training is adjusted individually to suit each person. Through adaptive diving people can improve their body balance, and fine motor control in their hands. Studies with veterans have shown that body balance after losing a leg can be improved with the help of adaptive diving. The studies also report an improvement of 3.7 and 3.9 points of the veterans anxiety and depression symptoms. The improvements were shown with higher self confidence, emotional calm, goal and purpose.

A diving service provider would generally need to provide extra diving support staff to ensure acceptable safety for an adaptive diver. A medical professional would be consulted to assess the diver's prospective abilities and suitability for training. Modified diving equipment is a common requirement.

==== Adaptive diving equipment ====
The diving industry can support adaptive divers by developing specialized equipment to help manage various problems. These include access to the water, which can utilize chair lifts or wheelchair ramps, vehicle modifications for wheelchairs, hoists or cranes similar in principle to diving stages used by commercial divers, and lifting harness similar in principle to these used by surface supplied divers.

Adaptive diving equipment includes specialized personal equipment, including protection of residual limbs and scar tissue, and propulsive equipment by way of customized fins for arms and legs, and inherently stable buoyancy control systems.

=== Structured therapeutic diving ===
Bathysmed is the only structured therapeutic scuba diving protocol developed in France in 2017 that integrates scuba diving with mental training techniques such as mindfulness meditation, Caycedian sophrology, and sports mental coaching. The method is designed as a complementary, non-pharmacological approach for the management of stress-related conditions, including post-traumatic stress disorder (PTSD), anxiety, burnout, and emotional dysregulation. Bathysmed follows a standardized progression of underwater exercises focusing on breathing regulation, body awareness, and emotional regulation. The protocol has been evaluated in several clinical studies involving trauma survivors, military personnel, and individuals experiencing chronic stress, reporting improvements in psychological well-being, stress regulation, and quality of life. Bathysmed is delivered by specially trained scuba diving instructors and is intended to be used alongside conventional medical or psychological care.

== Area of application ==
=== Veterans ===
Scuba diving can decrease depression, anxiety, and post-traumatic stress disorder (PTSD) in military veterans and people who are dealing with similar mental illnesses. Diving allows people to achieve a feeling of liberty, due to the concentration needed for the duration of the dive. This leads to an increase in mindfulness and a decrease in depression and anxiety levels. The risks that are involved in scuba diving may also lead to a decreased urge for control in life. This helps individuals reach acceptance of uncontrolled events. Next to a decrease in stress and anxiety, veterans participating in scuba diving also reported improved levels of concentration and focus.

The relatively risky sport or component of military service, has been established as a provisional element of therapy. Scuba diving has shown effectiveness as a therapeutic and rehabilitation process for veterans who had acquired traumatic physical and/or psychological injuries. Scuba diving was shown to be a therapeutic process that can help people with various disabilities to reconnect with such activities while simultaneously focusing on the clear goal of coping with their impairment. It can seem a very challenging activity for them but the apparent weightlessness in the water facilitates their experience. Even in extreme cases, like with people in a wheelchair, they regain a feeling of equalness in the water along with general mental improvements.

=== Disorders ===
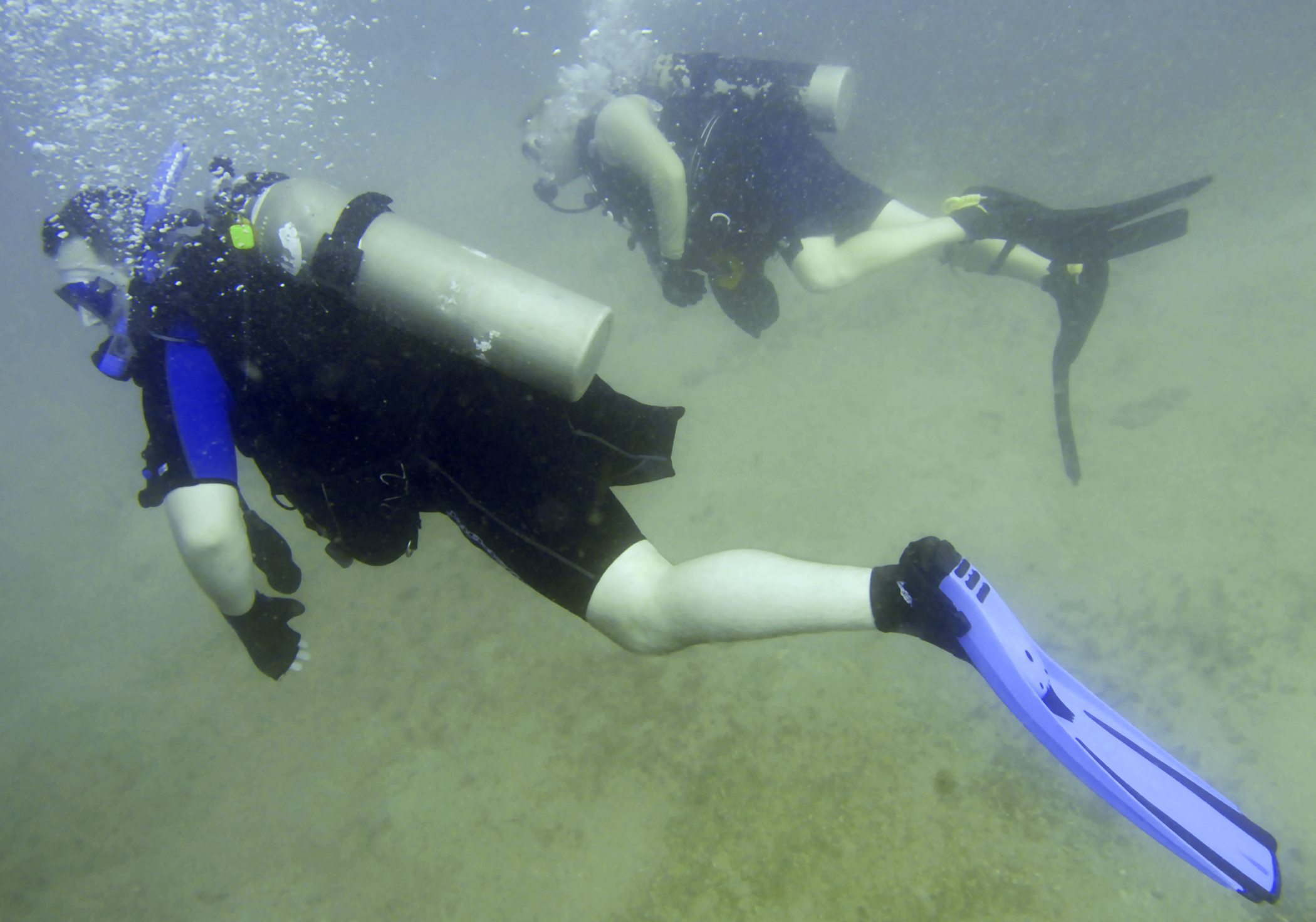
Charles James Shaffer completing his certification dive for the Soldiers Undertaking Disabled Scuba Program

The use of diving in therapy, specifically scuba diving, is applied to a wide range of disorders. The therapeutic effects range from psychological to physiological. In Norway, for example, it is applied to people who have lost their vision, suffer from multiple sclerosis or amputees. The aim is to increase their sensory awareness and promote the strengthening of confidence. Scuba diving creates a weightless sensation for divers when they are underwater, which has been known to relieve joint pain. Scuba diving is used for pain relief by many veterans, which also increases relaxation.

Military veterans may undergo therapeutic diving, when they suffer from physiological or psychological impairments, such as traumatic brain injuries or Post Traumatic Stress Disorder (PTSD). Scuba diving has the potential to benefit veterans with PTSD, as they respond less to conventional treatments than the non-military populations.

Diving therapy is advantageous for milder types of anxiety and chronic stress disorders, by increasing mindfulness and a sense of relaxation. Scuba interventions have been organized for people with neurological and neurodevelopmental disorders, such as autism spectrum disorder. Benefits include increased sense of competency, achievement, social support, and equality with other divers, with and without disabilities. Additionally, findings suggest scuba diving therapy can improve visual attention and efficiency with instructions for those with intellectual disabilities.

Therapeutic scuba programmes are delivered by local or international organizations which have an interest in supporting the physical and psychiatric rehabilitation and recovery of people with physical or mental health conditions.

Diving therapy is applied in different countries, ranging from Malaysia to the Bahamas, and Europ and UK.

== Effectiveness ==
Scuba diving is proven to help with physical, mental and social issues. For people with physical disabilities, scuba diving can help improve their self-perception. Through positive experiences and mastering the partly challenging techniques that are required in scuba diving, levels of self assessment can rise and levels of depression can significantly decrease. This can be explained by the reduced weight experienced in water, that accommodates people with disabilities to participate in physical activities. This allows the feeling of the disability to be diminished since individuals are not limited under water and they are even able to enhance their movement and improve their muscle strength. Diving can give individuals a feeling of accomplishment and therefore an increase in the level of contentment. Studies have also shown scuba diving therapy to help with social interactions and relationships: Participants noted that scuba diving has helped them to regulate their mood and made them less irritable in daily life. For some, even just thinking back to the dive can have a calming and relaxing effect. Apart from this, scuba diving can also have physical treatment effects. For instance, training to breathe under water can heal people suffering from chronic obstructive pulmonary disease by increasing the peak and endurance exercise capacities.

== Limitations ==
Many mental or physical health issues make it unsafe for a patient to undergo scuba treatment, as it requires processes such as thinking, concentration, or problem-solving. Before starting the therapy, a medical professional should evaluate the fitness-to-dive state of the patient.

Specific psychiatric medications are not compatible with diving, and scuba therapy is not recommended when they are used.

Higher costs are associated with scuba dive therapy, so the therapy is limited to patients who are able to finance it. Several organizations and charities have started fundraising to make the therapy more accessible to lower-income patients.

Scuba diving requires specialized equipment to ensure safety and comfort of the divers underwater. This leads to limitations due to the availability and cost of obtaining such equipment.

Trained professionals are needed to supervise therapy dives to ensure safety.

== Training ==
Training as an Adaptive Support Diver is provided by PADI, with the claimed goal of increasing awareness of diver's varying abilities and techniques applicable when diving with a buddy with a disability. The specialty training has prerequisites of Freediver or Open Water Diver certification and current Emergency First Response primary and secondary care certification. Adequate buoyancy control and trim skills are also recommended.

=== Specialized training ===
Bathysmed training is intended for certified scuba diving instructors seeking to acquire specific competencies in guiding divers engaged in mental health and well-being programs. The curriculum follows a structured framework combining theoretical and practical instruction, including stress physiology, emotional regulation, neuroscience of meditation, and techniques derived from Caycedian sophrology and sports mental coaching applied to the underwater environment. The training emphasizes protocol standardization, participant safety, ethical considerations, and adaptation of exercises to individual psychophysiological capacities. Instructors who complete the training are qualified to deliver Bathysmed sessions in confined water or open water settings, as a complementary approach alongside conventional medical or psychological care.

== See also ==
- List of therapies
