= Civil liability in recreational diving =

Legal duty of care, negligence and liability in recreational diving

The civil liability of a recreational diver may include a duty of care to another diver during a dive. Breach of this duty that is a proximate cause of injury or loss to the other diver may lead to civil litigation for damages in compensation for the injury or loss suffered.

Participation in recreational diving implies acceptance of the inherent risks of the activity. Diver training includes training in procedures known to reduce these risks to a level considered acceptable by the certification agency, and issue of certification implies that the agency accepts that the instructor has assessed the diver to be sufficiently competent in these skills at the time of assessment and to be competent to accept the associated risks. Certification relates to a set of skills and knowledge defined by the associated training standard, which also specifies the limitations on the scope of diving activities for which the diver is deemed competent. These limitations involve depth, environment and equipment that the diver has been trained to use. Intentionally diving significantly beyond the scope of certified competence is at the diver's risk, and may be construed as negligence if it puts another person at risk. Recommendations generally suggest that extending the scope should be done gradually, and preferably under the guidance of another diver experienced in similar conditions. The training agencies usually specify that any extension of scope should only be done by further training under a registered instructor, but this is not always practicable, or even possible, as there can always be circumstances that differ from those experienced during training.

Retention of skills requires exercise of those skills, and prolonged periods between dives will degrade skills by unpredictable amounts. This is recognised by training agencies, which require instructors to keep in date, and recommend that divers take part in refresher courses after long periods of diving inactivity.

== Duty ==
A recreational diver may have a duty of care to another diver if one of these conditions occurs:

- The diver is the instructor of the other diver. This is usually established by a contract or other agreement to teach the other diver how to dive, or some part of the skills and knowledge required for certification as a competent diver.
- The diver is divemaster to the other diver. This may be a formal arrangement where the divemaster is paid to lead a dive, or less formal where the divemaster leads a group from a club or a group of acquaintances. Giving the divers instructions (as opposed to advice or information) regarding the dive plan may be construed as establishing a dive leader relationship. Simply informing them of the known geography, expected conditions and a maximum time limit for the dive should not.
- The diver accepts the other diver as a dive buddy for a dive. If no limitations are stated, it may reasonably be assumed that buddy responsibilities are as specified in the training standards for the certification of each diver. This can be problematic if the divers have different training and certification, particularly if one is a registered instructor or divemaster, as it may be claimed that this implies a greater duty of care based on competence. In the absence of any record of an agreement that the dive will be conducted to a different set of protocols, the default assumption may be that protocols of the training organisations at the time of certification will be followed, or should have been followed.

The existence of a duty of care between two persons depends on the relationship between them. Dive buddies who depend on each other to perform tasks such as equipment checks and provide assistance in an emergency are obliged to act reasonably and not increase the risks of the activity, but may be excluded from liability by assumption of the risk or waiver.

=== Duty of the operator ===
Where relevant, the dive operator is responsible for:

- ensuring that the vessel is suitable and carries the necessary safety equipment,
- the crew are competent and carry out the necessary procedures on the surface to support a safe experience for a certified diver. Are you aware of what the National Small Vessel Safety Regulations require of you?
- safely transporting the divers to dive sites that are suitable based on the certification of the divers and the expected conditions,
- assessing the site conditions on arrival, conducting a dive briefing informing the divers of the known and reasonably foreseeable conditions and hazards of the site,
- recalling divers to the surface in an emergency,
- recovering a distressed or incapacitated diver on the surface into the boat,
- alerting the emergency services in the event of an accident, and
- ensuring that no-one is left behind after the dive.

In some jurisdictions the dive boat skipper may be legally obliged to be licensed to operate a dive boat. In South Africa a "diving endorsement" to the skipper's certificate of competence is a requirement to operate a dive boat as a commercial operation.

In a number of US cases, the failure of a charter operator to assign a buddy has been ruled a breach of the industry standard of care. It is not clear what competence or certification is required to allocate buddy pairs, and whether this duty would also apply to a boat operator who is not a divemaster or instructor. Defendants have argued that a person who dived without an allocated buddy was contributorily negligent as they also did not meet the appropriate standard of care.

==== Limiting the liability of the operator ====
Waivers and release
The waiver is intended as a legal defense against lawsuits claiming ordinary negligence by the operator. The diver acknowledges understanding and acceptance of the risks inherent to scuba diving. The waiver may also require the diver to follow recognised safe diving practices. By signing the waiver the diver agrees not to sue the operator for injuries and damage due to ordinary negligence relating to the diving activity. It will generally not be enforceable for gross negligence and events beyond the normal scope of diving.

Medical statement
The medical statement is intended to draw the diver's attention to the range of medical conditions that may increase the risk of injury during a dive. Failure to disclose a known medical condition which is then the cause of an injury will usually disqualify the diver from legal compensation, and may also void an insurance claim. It also transfers responsibility for establishing fitness to dive from the operator to the diver.

=== Duty of the diver ===
The certified diver is responsible for ensuring that their personal equipment, competence and fitness is sufficient to ensure their own safety in and under the water on the planned dive, allowing for reasonably foreseeable contingencies, and to follow safe diving practices.

A diver in training may not be competent to assume one or more of these duties, or their competence may be limited, depending on their existing certification. The duty of care of the instructor is to compensate for the known or reasonably predictable shortfalls in the learner's competence.

==== Responsibilities of buddies ====
The responsibilities of dive buddies have been established by training standards and usage, but there is no definitive list of buddy legal obligations. An effective way to protect oneself from liability is to comply with the buddy practices agreed between the divers before the dive, and not make assumptions that both parties are following the same set of practices. Buddies are responsible for:

- planning the dive, taking into account known hazards and personal limitations and the level of risk acceptable to both
- visually checking each other's equipment after kitting up and before entering the water
- monitoring each other's safety throughout the dive
- providing assistance to an entangled buddy
- sharing breathing gas in an emergency
- getting each other to the surface in an emergency

Training agencies may differ in the detail of the procedures divers are expected to use in each of these cases. In most cases both systems work and are reasonably compatible when they require the active participation of one diver at a time, but there are examples where differences could lead to complications. For example, the specific procedures for sharing air can vary considerably between agencies, and have changed over time. It is quite possible for a buddy pair to have been trained in two conflicting protocols for air sharing, and each use equipment selected according to the system they were trained to use. In an emergency this could lead to sub-optimal response even if the procedures had been agreed during planning.

Divers may be given vague, conflicting and outmoded advice:

- "Always dive with a buddy." – Solo diving is fairly common, it is actively promoted in books and magazines, there are recognised certifications in solo diving, a great deal of nominally buddy diving is effectively solo diving, and solo diving can eliminate the risks of an incompetent buddy. On the other hand, service providers may be found negligent if they do not allocate buddies.
- "Know how to use decompression tables." – Many divers use dive computers exclusively for diving where no obligatory decompression is required, and a computer failure can be satisfactorily managed by an immediate ascent at a controlled rate. Some of these divers never use tables, and have no obvious need to be able to do so.
- "Do not make decompression dives." – All dives are decompression dives, and what is actually meant is not to do dives that require decompression stops during a direct ascent from any point in the planned dive profile. Dives requiring stops are fairly common when using dive computers with conservative algorithms, safety stops and slow ascent rates. Extended-range and tech diving routinely require planned decompression, and mitigation procedures for a possible computer failure on a decompression dive are well known.
- "Do not dive beyond 60 feet (18 m) as an open-water diver or beyond 130 feet (40 m) as a recreational diver." This is the policy of only some diver certification agencies, and may be appropriate for their training standards. Other organisations with different training standards have established different recommendations. Technical divers are generally considered competent to dive to greater depths, and technical diving is legally considered recreational diving in some jurisdictions, such as the USA.

==== Solo diving option ====
An option for some divers is to dive without a buddy. Although this would relieve the diver of any duty to a buddy and any related liability, this may not be permitted by the service provider, or in a few cases, by national law.

Not all dive professionals agree that the buddy system is entirely preferable to solo diving. Even professionals who basically support the buddy system in theory accept that in practice it often leaves a great deal to be desired, and that in some circumstances diving solo may be safer as this avoids the hazards imposed by a panicked or incompetent buddy. Solo diving advocates also contend that most dives do not follow the buddy system as specified by the training agencies, as the divers are often too far apart to notice if a problem occurs or to respond effectively.

==== Remedies ====
The usual strategies used by divers to minimize the likelihood of being sued and the consequences of a lawsuit are insurance, liability releases and care in selecting a buddy. Following the accepted procedures when buddy diving, ensuring personal competence and taking due care will reduce the risk of an incident occurring due to fault of the diver, and if one does occur, will be a useful defence against claims of negligence.

Insurance
Adequate insurance cover of the defendant will not generally prevent litigation, as the policy may be seen as a guarantee of ability to pay, and may thereby encourage litigation, but it does provide financial relief for the defendant. Adequate cover of the injured party is more likely to result in an insurance payout than litigation, however many insurance policies exclude cover for voluntary activities which may be construed as "dangerous", or specifically exclude scuba diving.

Specific liability releases
Divers who want liability protection beyond that afforded by insurance may provide specific waivers or amend service provider waivers to include buddies as persons contractually shielded from liability.

Choice of buddy
An obvious solution is for the diver to be a competent, responsible buddy, to follow recommended procedure at all times, and to only dive with a buddy who is known to also be competent, responsible and to follow the same recommended procedures at all times. A competent diver with extensive experience who practices emergency procedures often enough to respond with confidence is less likely to panic in an emergency. Buddies equipment must be compatible and allow the emergency procedures familiar to both divers. A diver should not allow the service provider to pressure them into accepting a diver as a buddy if they are not reasonably confident that the allocated diver is both competent and willing to behave as a responsible buddy.

== Inherent dangers and assumption of risk ==
In recreational diving the participant is taking on a voluntary risk. In sport participants accept that other participants may be careless and may cause injuries to others due to inept behaviour.

Assumption of risk is a defense in the law of torts, which bars or reduces a plaintiff's right to recovery against a negligent tortfeasor if the defendant can demonstrate that the plaintiff voluntarily and knowingly assumed the risks at issue inherent to the dangerous activity in which they were participating at the time of the injury.

What is usually meant by assumption of risk is more precisely termed primary or "express" assumption of risk. It occurs when the plaintiff has either expressly or implicitly relieved the defendant of the duty to mitigate or relieve the risk causing the injury from which the cause of action arises. It operates as a complete bar to liability on the theory that upon assumption of the risk, there is no longer a duty of care between the defendant and the plaintiff, and without a duty owed by the defendant, there can be no negligence on their part. However, primary assumption of risk is not a blanket exemption from liability for the operators of a dangerous activity. The specific risk causing the injury must have been known to, and appreciated by, the plaintiff in order for primary assumption of risk to apply. Also, assumption of risk does not absolve a defendant of liability for reckless conduct.

== Breach ==
To establish negligence in a civil court there must be a breach of duty which can be shown to have caused harm to the other person.

A breach is a failure to follow an appropriate standard of care where a duty exists based on a relationship. This can occur between friends and between a provider and a client.

Once it is established that the defendant owed a duty to the plaintiff/claimant, the matter of whether or not that duty was breached must be settled. A defendant who knowingly exposes the plaintiff/claimant to a substantial risk of loss, or fails to recognise a substantial risk of loss to the plaintiff/claimant, which any reasonable person in the same situation would clearly recognise, breaches that duty.

=== Negligence ===
The standard action in tort is negligence. The tort of negligence provides a cause of action leading to damages, or to relief, in each case designed to protect legal rights, including those of personal safety, property, and, in some cases, intangible economic interests or noneconomic interests such as the tort of negligent infliction of emotional distress in the United States. Negligence actions include claims following personal injury accidents of many kinds, including scuba diving.

If someone is not intending to do harm but can reasonably foresee that their actions could harm another person, and they continue with those actions and do not stop, and that other person is eventually injured or suffers damages as a consequence of those actions, that is negligence, and the injured party can hold the negligent person liable for compensation.

=== Dereliction of duty of care ===
A person who has a legal duty to take reasonable care and does not do so, can be held liable for damages that are directly caused by the breach of that duty. "Directly caused" means that the injury or damage is a direct consequence of the failure to perform the reasonable duty. "Reasonable care" is the standard of care that is considered reasonable to expect in a given situation, taking into account the conditions, experience, training, qualifications, etc. The standard does not require perfection and makes allowance for mistakes and errors in judgement, provided that the person has exercised caution appropriate to the circumstances. In determining a standard of care, the courts would take an objective approach, and take into account the person's specific knowledge or experience, and the level at which the person represented themself.

== Litigation ==
When a voluntarily accepted risk leads to an involuntary injury, there must be evidence of someone either doing something that they should not have done or not doing something that they should have done, before a claim for damages can succeed.

A large proportion of cases are litigated due to uncertainty of the cause of the accident.

The history of appeal cases in the USA tends to rule that the buddy relationship creates a duty to act reasonably and not increase the risks associated with diving. The existence of damages can usually be proven though the amount may be contested. The aspect that is usually litigated is whether a breach occurred and whether the breach was a proximate case of the injury. A defense often raised is assumption of the risk by the plaintiff, supported where applicable by a signed waiver.

In about 70% of diving fatalities, drowning is reported as the cause of death, without specifying the reason for drowning. Drowning generally just means that the diver died underwater and there was no physical obstacle to water entering the respiratory passages. It is a diagnosis that is often reached in the absence of a more specific understanding of the sequence of events, and often reached when little effort has gone into the investigation to exclude other possible causes to find out why the diver drowned.

There is a common misconception and presumption by the general public that someone should have intervened to prevent the drowning, which presupposes that someone should have known it was happening, and was negligent in not taking preventative action. A large amount of litigation is based on the desire to hold someone else accountable, and this is aggravated by the commonly inadequate investigation and vague conclusions regarding the trigger and sequence of events in fatal accidents. Statistics indicate that the majority of diving fatalities are due to error on the part of the victim.

=== Preservation of evidence ===
Failure to identify, preserve, and produce critical evidence such as dive computer data can result in sanctions against the responsible party, including findings in favour of the party requesting the lost information. Investigators without a sufficient knowledge of diving equipment have been known to destroy or lose critical evidence through mishandling of equipment, even when it survived rescue and recovery efforts.

=== Proximate cause ===
In law, a proximate cause is an event sufficiently related to an injury that the courts deem the event to be the cause of that injury. There are two types of causation in the law: cause-in-fact, and proximate (or legal) cause, which tends to be an act or omission by a person. Legal causation is the "causal relationship between conduct and result". In other words, causation provides a means of connecting conduct with a resulting effect, typically an injury, as a means to establishing the scope of liability. In many cases negligence can be attributed to both the plaintiff, or decedent, and the defendants. The degree of negligence established by the court reduces the recovery of damages in that proportion.

=== Damages ===
In a claim for damages the plaintiff must convince the court that injury or loss occurred, and that the compensation value claimed is realistic. Damages are likely to be limited to those reasonably foreseeable by the defendant. If a defendant could not reasonably have foreseen that someone might be hurt by their actions, there may be no liability.
