= Breathing performance of regulators =

Capacity of breathing regulators to function as specified

A typical graph produced when testing the breathing performance of a diving regulator

The breathing performance of regulators is a measure of the ability of a breathing gas regulator to meet the demands placed on it at varying ambient pressures and temperatures, and under varying breathing loads, for the range of breathing gases it may be expected to deliver. Performance is an important factor in design and selection of breathing regulators for any application, but particularly for underwater diving, as the range of ambient operating pressures and temperatures, and variety of breathing gases is broader in this application. A diving regulator is a device that reduces the high pressure in a diving cylinder or surface supply hose to the same pressure as the diver's surroundings. It is desirable that breathing from a regulator requires low effort even when supplying large amounts of breathing gas as this is commonly the limiting factor for underwater exertion, and can be critical during diving emergencies. It is also preferable that the gas is delivered smoothly without any sudden changes in resistance while inhaling or exhaling, and that the regulator does not lock up and either fail to supply gas or free-flow. Although these factors may be judged subjectively, it is convenient to have standards by which the many different types and manufactures of regulators may be objectively compared.

Various breathing machines have been developed and used for assessment of breathing apparatus performance. Ansti Test Systems developed a turnkey system that measures the inhalation and exhalation effort in using a regulator, and produces graphs indicating the work of breathing at the set depth pressure and respiratory minute volume for the gas mixture used. Publishing results of the performance of regulators in the ANSTI test machine has resulted in performance improvements.

== Relevance ==
Breathing performance of the regulator is relevant in all circumstances where a regulator is used to control the flow of breathing gas in a supply on demand system. In some of these applications, a very basic regulator will perform adequately. In other applications, the performance of the regulator may limit the performance of the user. A high-performance regulator for a given combination of gas mixture and ambient pressure is defined as one which will provide a low work of breathing at high RMV, while supplying a flow of gas only when triggered by inhalation, and allowing an outflow of exhaled gas with minimum resistance.

Another aspect of breathing performance is demand regulator performance in cold water, where a high flow rate may cause chilling sufficient to lock up the mechanism with ice, which usually causes a severe free-flow with consequent loss of breathing gas, which can only be stopped by shutting off the cylinder valve.

A healthy person at rest at surface atmospheric pressure expends only a small amount of available effort on breathing. This can change considerably as the density of breathing gas increases at higher ambient pressure. When the energy expended to remove carbon dioxide produces more carbon dioxide than it removes the person will suffer from hypercapnia in a positive feedback cycle ending in unconsciousness and eventually death. Work of breathing is affected by breathing rate, breathing pattern, gas density, physiological factors, and the fluid dynamic details of the breathing apparatus, these being the frictional resistance to flow, and pressure differences required to open valves and hold them open to flow.

Breathing gas density can be reduced by using helium as the basic component, with sufficient oxygen added to suit the circumstances and retain a partial pressure sufficient to sustain consciousness but not so much as to cause oxygen toxicity problems. Frictional resistance to flow is influenced by the shape and size of the gas passages, and the pressure, density, viscosity, and velocity of the gas. Valve cracking pressure is a factor of design and settings of the valve mechanisms. The breathing performance of regulators assumes gas density is specified and measures the resistance to flow during the full breathing cycle with a given volumetric flow rate as a pressure drop between the mouthpiece and the exterior environment.

== Measurement ==
=== Work of breathing ===
Work of breathing (WOB) is the energy expended to inhale and exhale a breathing gas. It is usually expressed as work per unit volume, for example, joules/litre, or as a work rate (power), such as joules/min or equivalent units, as it is not particularly useful without a reference to volume or time. It can be calculated in terms of the pulmonary pressure multiplied by the change in pulmonary volume, or in terms of the oxygen consumption attributable to breathing.

The total work of breathing when using a breathing apparatus is the sum of the physiological work of breathing and the mechanical work of breathing of the apparatus. In a normal resting state the physiological work of breathing constitutes about 5% of the total body oxygen consumption. It can increase considerably due to illness or constraints on gas flow imposed by breathing apparatus, ambient pressure, or breathing gas composition.

The performance of a regulator refers to the mechanical work of breathing of the regulator and excludes the physiological work of breathing. Mechanical work of breathing is strongly influenced by breathing rate, which is specified in the standards.

For a given volume over a given time, work of breathing for the full breath cycle and for the inhalation part of the cycle are calculated from the instantaneous pressures measured between the inside and outside of the regulator casing. The changes in volume are known from the characteristics of the positive displacement breathing cycle simulator. Peak pressures and transient pressure spikes are also measured, and recorded for analysis, as there are limits specified in the standards for these values. Work of breathing is the instantaneous pressure x change in volume integrated over the cycle, and inhalation work of breathing is the work of breathing for the inhalation part of the cycle.

The breathing cycle of the test machine may not accurately represent flow in any given human breath. The ANSTI testing machine uses a sinusoidal volume change, which is simple to analyse. A human breath can be very variable.

=== Cold water function testing ===
U.S. Navy Experimental Diving Unit's unmanned cold water test procedures (1994) have been used as an unofficial standard for cold water testing by various military users and major equipment manufacturers.

European CE open circuit standard EN 250 of 1993 set a higher level for open circuit scuba testing for breathing performance, cold water testing, proof, pressure, mechanical, storage temperatures, and CO_{2} wash out tests. The standard also set requirements for failure modes and effects analysis, and other issues relating to manufacturing, quality assurance and documentation. This standard drew attention to issues with a lot of existing equipment, and led to major improvements in open circuit regulator performance.

Early testing done by the US Navy was the origin of underwater breathing apparatus simulation testing in the late 1970s. The breathing simulator systems built by Stephen Reimers were bought by the Ministry of Defence in the UK and by some private equipment manufactures like Kirby Morgan Diving Systems, and helped develop European standards in the early 1990s, but the introduction of a complete breathing simulator system by ANSTI Test Systems Ltd in the UK made possible the accurate breathing simulator testing that is the current practice. The computerized ANSTI breathing simulator systems made faster, easier and more accurate testing possible, and are designed for testing in all realistic water temperatures.

The system includes precise humidity and exhalation temperature control as well as environmental water temperature control from 0 to 50 °C (32 to 122 °F), facilities for breath by breath CO_{2} analysis and closed circuit rebreather set point control and scrubber endurance testing. Neither the EN250 standard nor the US Navy unmanned test procedures use any kind of real world human diving scenario as the basis for testing, including cold water testing. The US Navy procedure has been to test regulators primarily at a depth of 190 fsw (58 msw) in water 28 to 29 °F (−2 to −2 °C) at a very high breathing rate of 62.5 lpm for a minimum of 30 minutes, with inlet pressure to the first stage of 1,500 pounds per square inch (100 bar), which results in an average second stage inlet temperature of around 7 °F (−14 °C), compared to an average of −13 °F (−25 °C) if 3,000 pounds per square inch (210 bar) would be used. The US Navy cold water test criteria and the EU EN250 test criteria are based on whether the regulator meets minimum breathing performance requirements and whether or not a free flow starts. Very few regulators can pass this test because all regulators will form ice in the second stage under the extreme test conditions, though this may not cause the regulator to free flow or go outside the performance criteria.

The cold water testing specified in EN250:2000 has scuba regulators tested in water 4 °C (39 °F) or colder. Regulators are tested in both facing forward and facing down positions. The test starts at (50 msw) 165 fsw and the regulator is breathed at 62.5 lpm for five minutes. To pass, the regulator must remain within the work of breathing limits and must not free flow. The formation of ice is not considered as long as the ice does not degrade the breathing performance beyond minimum performance requirements, and it does not free-flow.

The CE test uses an air supply starting at the highest pressure the regulator is rated for and is breathed for five minutes at 62.5 lpm using an exhalation temperature of 28 ±2°C (82.4 ±3.6°F) and an exhalation relative humidity of no less than 90%.

=== ANSTI machine ===
The ANSTI Breathing Simulator is rated to a maximum working pressure of 100 msw. It uses a piston mechanism to provide an accurate and repeatable volume displacement with a sine wave drive mechanism. It has adjustable tidal volume and breathing rate settings which can provide ventilation rates from 10 to 180 litres per minute.

== Applications of breathing gas regulators ==
- Scuba diving – All breathing gas is carried in high-pressure cylinders by the diver. primary pressure reduction in the first stage from storage pressure to an intermediate pressure causes cooling proportional to the pressure drop.
  - Recreational scuba diving – Air and nitrox at ambient pressures up to about 40 msw.
  - Technical diving – Ambient pressures may significantly exceed 30 msw
    - Mixed gas – Breathing gases containing helium to limit narcosis and work of breathing
    - Decompression gas – Breathing gases with high oxygen partial pressures, generally not very high ambient pressure
- Surface-supplied diving – Breathing gas supplied from the surface at a wide range of depths
  - Open circuit – Gas is released into the environment and lost on exhalation
  - Breathing gas reclaim systems – Helium based breathing gas is returned to the surface for recycling via an exhaust regulator to save expensive gas
- Built-in breathing systems in hyperbaric environments – High oxygen content gas is vented to the exterior via an exhaust regulator to avoid high fire risk. High performance not generally needed, as the user is normally resting.
- Oxygen administration for first aid in diving accidents – High oxygen fraction at surface pressure, fairly low flow rate, but user may be injured and have difficulty breathing.
- Self-contained breathing apparatus (SCBA) for rescue, firefighting, or other work in unbreathable atmospheres.
- Submarine emergency gas supply (Submarine BIBS) – Survival conditions, at unpredictable pressures, but higher than normal atmospheric. Exhaled gas is trapped in the submarine, so pressure will gradually build up.
- Flight crew breathing apparatus – Oxygen supply for unpressurized aircraft – Low ambient pressure due to high altitude. Air supply enriched by additional oxygen. Flow rate not expected to be very high

== Standards ==
=== European Union ===
In the European Union the standard EN250:2000 Respiratory equipment. Open-circuit self-contained compressed air diving apparatus. Requirements, testing, marking defines minimum performance standards for "Open-circuit self-contained compressed air diving apparatus", and BS 8547:2016 defines requirements for demand regulators to be used at depths exceeding 50 m. EN 13949: 2003 – Respiratory Equipment – Open Circuit Self-Contained Diving Apparatus for use with Compressed Nitrox and Oxygen – Requirements, Testing, Marking defines requirements for regulators to be used with raised levels of oxygen.

The standard contains limits on inhalation and exhalation pressures and overall work of breathing. It specifies the following, under test conditions of a breathing rate of 62.5 litres (2.2 ft^{3}) per minute and an ambient pressure of 6 bars (600 kPa):

- Work of breathing: <3.0 joules per litre
- Peak respiratory pressure: ±25 mbar (±2.5 kPa) (inhalation or exhalation)
- Inhalation work of breathing: <0.3 joule per litre
- Pressure spikes with no measurable positive work of breathing: <10 mbar (1 kPa)
- Pressure spikes with measurable positive work of breathing: <5 mbar (0.5 kPa)

Although a regulator meeting the above limits will supply sufficient air where the first stage feeds a single second stage, it is not necessarily capable of supplying sufficient air in all circumstances when a single first stage feeds two second stages simultaneously.

==== Related standards ====
In Europe, EN 250: 2014 – Respiratory Equipment – Open Circuit Self - Contained Compressed Air Diving Apparatus – Requirements, Testing and Marking defines the minimum requirements for breathing performance of regulators, and BS 8547:2016 defines requirements for demand regulators to be used at depths exceeding 50 m. EN 13949: 2003 – Respiratory Equipment – Open Circuit Self-Contained Diving Apparatus for use with Compressed Nitrox and Oxygen – Requirements, Testing, Marking. defines requirements for regulators to be used with raised levels of oxygen.

EN 15333 – 1: 2008 COR 2009 – Respiratory Equipment – Open-Circuit Umbilical Supplied Compressed Gas Diving Apparatus – Part 1: Demand Apparatus. and EN 15333 – 2: 2009 – Respiratory Equipment – Open-Circuit Umbilical Supplied Compressed Gas Diving Apparatus – Part 2: Free Flow Apparatus.

I.S. EN 14143: 2013 – Respiratory Equipment – Self-Contained Re-Breathing Diving Apparatus defines minimum requirements for rebreathers.

=== US Military ===
In the United States Military, the standard for single-hose scuba regulators was MIl-R-24169B, now withdrawn.

== See also ==
- Breathing gas regulator – Mechanism to control the pressure of a breathing gas
- Human factors in diving equipment design – Influence of the interaction between the user and the equipment on design
- Hypercapnia – Abnormally high tissue carbon dioxide levels
- Mechanism of diving regulators – Arrangement and function of the components of regulators for underwater diving
- Work of breathing – Energy expended to inhale and exhale a breathing gas
