= Cascade filling system =

Filling pressurized gas from a series of storage cylinders

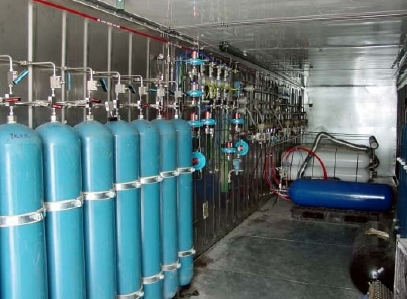
Hydrogen storage cylinders in a cascade filling system

A cascade filling system is a high-pressure gas cylinder storage system that is used for the refilling of smaller compressed gas cylinders. In some applications, each of the large cylinders is filled by a compressor, otherwise they may be filled remotely and replaced when the pressure is too low for effective transfer. The cascade system allows small cylinders to be filled without a compressor. In addition, a cascade system is useful as a reservoir to allow a low-capacity compressor to meet the demand of filling several small cylinders in close succession, with longer intermediate periods during which the storage cylinders can be recharged.

== Principle of operation ==
When gas in a cylinder at high pressure is allowed to flow to another cylinder containing gas at a lower pressure, the pressures will equalize to a value somewhere between the two initial pressures. The equilibrium pressure is affected by transfer rate as it will be influenced by temperature, but at a constant temperature, the equilibrium pressure is described by Dalton's law of partial pressures and Boyle's law for ideal gases.

The formula for the equilibrium pressure is:

P_{3} = (P_{1}×V_{1}+P_{2}×V_{2})/(V_{1}+V_{2})
where P_{1} and V_{1} are the initial pressure and volume of one cylinder
P_{2} and V_{2} the initial pressure and volume of the other cylinder
and P_{3} is the equilibrium pressure.

An example could be a 100-litre (internal volume) cylinder (V_{1}) pressurised to 200 bar (P_{1}) filling a 10-litre (internal volume) cylinder (V_{2}) which was unpressurised (P_{2} = 1 bar) (resulting in both cylinder equalising to approximately 180 bar (P_{3}). If another 100-liter cylinder pressurized this time to 250 bar were then used to "top-up" the 10-liter cylinder, both of these cylinders would equalize to about 240 bar. However, if the higher pressure 100-liter cylinder were used first, the 10-liter cylinder would equalize to about 225 bar and the lower pressure 100-liter cylinder could not be used to top it up. In a cascade storage system, several large cylinders are used to bring a small cylinder up to the desired pressure, by always using the supply cylinder with the lowest usable pressure first, then the cylinder with the next lowest pressure, and so on.

In practice, the theoretical transfers can only be achieved if the gases are allowed to reach a temperature equilibrium before disconnection. This requires significant time, and a lower efficiency may be accepted to save time. Actual transfer can be calculated using the general gas equation of state if the temperature of the gas in the cylinder is accurately measured.

== Uses ==
=== Breathing sets ===
A breathing set cylinder may be filled to its working pressure by decanting from larger (often 50 liters) cylinders. (To make this easy the neck of the cylinder of the Siebe Gorman Salvus rebreather had the same thread as an oxygen storage cylinder, but the opposite gender, for direct decanting.) The storage cylinders are available in a variety of sizes, typically from 50 litre internal capacity to well over 100 litres.

In the more general case, a high-pressure hose known as a filling whip is used to connect the filling panel or storage cylinder to the receiving cylinder.

Cascade filling is often used for partial pressure blending of breathing gas mixtures for diving, to economize on the relatively expensive oxygen, for nitrox, and the even more expensive helium in trimix or heliox mixtures.

=== Compressed natural gas fueling ===
Cascade storage is used at compressed natural gas (CNG) fueling stations. Typically three CNG tanks will be used, and a vehicle will first be fueled from one of them, which will result in an incomplete fill, perhaps to 2000 psig for a 3000 psig tank. The second and third tanks will bring the vehicle's tank closer to 3000 psi. The station normally has a compressor, which refills the station's tanks, using natural gas from a utility line. This prevents accidentally overfilling the tank, which could happen with a system using a single fueling tank at a higher pressure than the target pressure for the vehicle.

=== Hydrogen storage ===
A proposed cascade storage systems for hydrogen storage, for example at hydrogen stations, fuel dispenser uses separate cascade banks for separate dispensers, with an automatic system to cross over to the higher pressure bank if one dispenser is over-utilised.

The storage banks would comprise three tanks each, and filling would proceed based on filling to balancing pressure in order of the smallest positive difference between storage and vehicle tank until the vehicle tank is full. The storage banks would be fitted with a safety venting system to prevent overfilling, with additional high pressure bursting discs (8000psi) between the compressors and the storage units and vent to atmosphere at a safe distance from personnel and infrastructure.

== Arrangement of system ==
Schematic diagram of a simple cascade filling system

The storage cylinders may be used independently in sequence using a portable transfer whip with a pressure gauge and manual bleed valve, to transfill the receiving cylinder until the appropriate fill pressure has been reached, or the storage cylinders may be connected to a manifold system and a filling control panel with one or more filling whips.

Ideally, each storage cylinder has an independent connection to the filling panel with a contents pressure gauge and supply valve dedicated to that cylinder, and a filling gauge connected to the filling whip, so the operator can see at a glance the next higher storage cylinder pressure compared to the receiving cylinder pressure.

The storage cylinders may be filled remotely and connected to the manifold by a flexible hose when in use, or maybe permanently connected and refilled by a compressor through a dedicated filling system, which may be automated or manually controlled.

An over-pressure safety valve is usually installed inline between the compressor and the storage units to protect the cylinders from overfilling, and each cylinder may also be protected by a rupture disc.
