= Blood shift =

Set index article

Blood shift has at least two separate meanings:

- In medicine, it is synonymous with left shift
- In diving physiology, it is part of the diving reflex
