= Braile =

Braile can refer to:

- Brailes or brails, metal strips on diving suits
- Braille, a tactile writing system used by blind or visually impaired people

== See also ==
- Brail, in a sailing ship, a small line used to haul in or up the edges or corners of sails, before furling
