= Canoe and kayak diving =

Recreational diving from a canoe or kayak

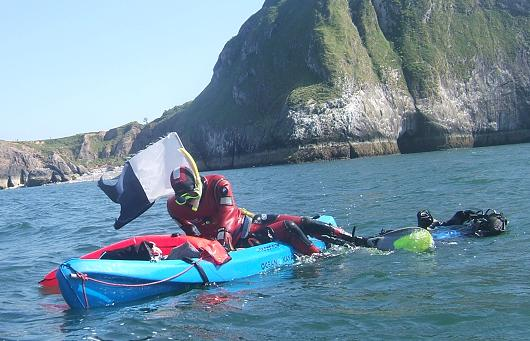
Diver climbing back onto a kayak

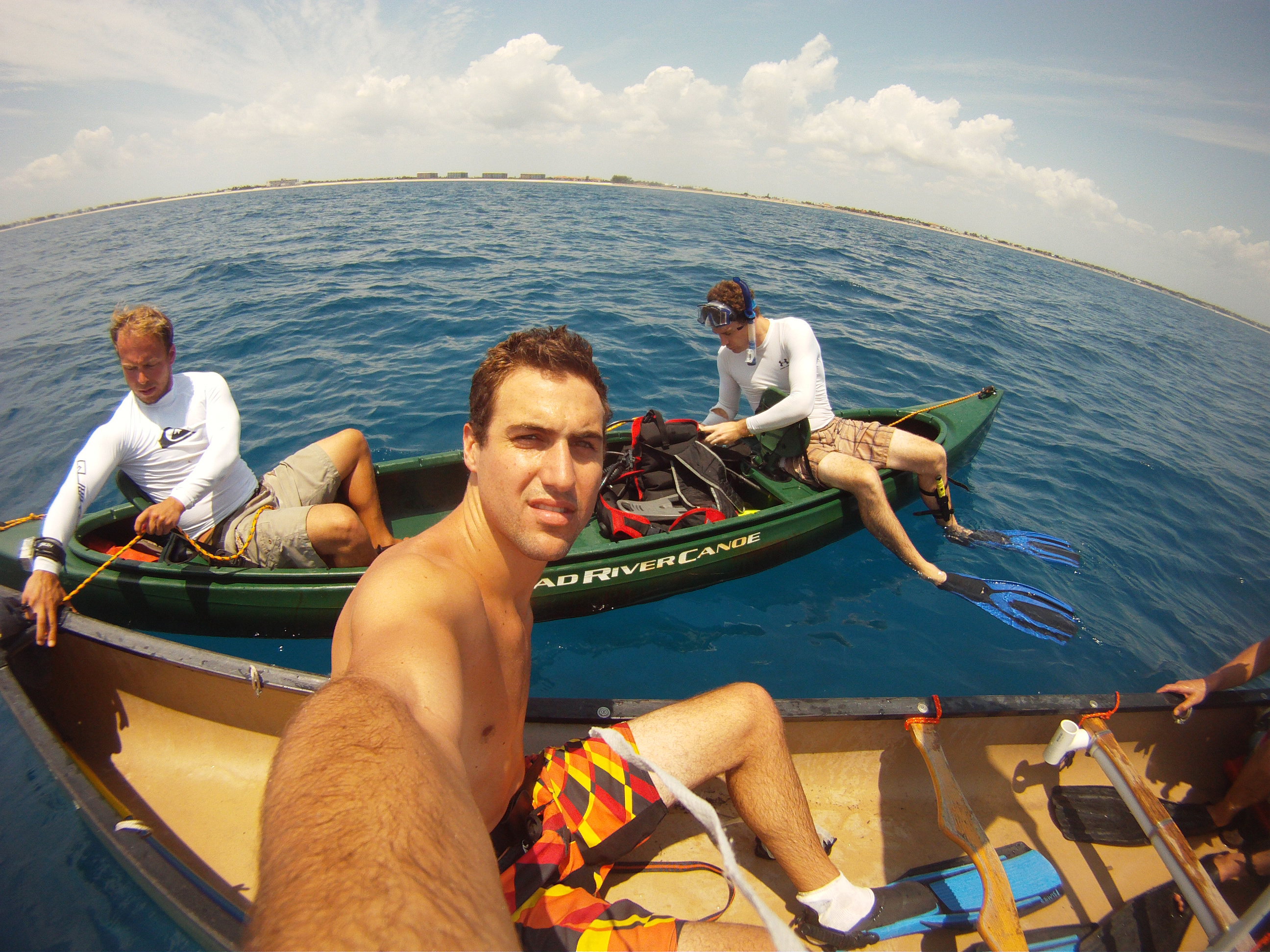
Canoe divers preparing for a drift dive.

Canoe diving and Kayak diving are recreational diving where the divers paddle to a diving site in a canoe or kayak carrying all their gear in or on the boat to the place they want to dive. Canoe or kayak diving gives the diver independence from dive boat operators, while allowing dives at sites which are too far to comfortably swim, but are sufficiently sheltered.

The range can be up to several kilometres along the coastline from the launching point to a place where access would be difficult from the shore, although the sea is sheltered. It is a considerably cheaper alternative to using a powered boat, as well as combining the experience of sea kayaking or canoeing with scuba diving.

Other advantages of canoe and kayak diving include:

- breathing gas is not needed for getting to and from the site,
- passage through a surf line can be easier on a kayak than on a wider boat,
- rip, tidal and longshore currents are easier to manage
- no engine is required - this is cheap, light and has a low environmental impact,
- the canoe or kayak can get to places that are inaccessible to larger boats,

== Canoe diving ==
Though similar to kayak diving in which divers use a sit-on-top kayak instead of a canoe, canoe diving allows divers to traverse greater distances at considerably faster speeds. Canoes can hold substantially more weight than a kayak, and they have more room for gear. They also offer paddlers a better view of the area around them.

Due to various economic constraints, canoe diving has recently gained popularity along the Gold Coast of Florida where many dive sites are less than three kilometers from shore. It is appealing to many individuals because it is relatively inexpensive and adventurous. Traditionally, a charter service is used to access offshore dive sites which can be very costly. While some may enjoy the luxury and safety of a hired charter boat, captain, and crew, others seek the challenge and thrill of navigating a canoe loaded with cumbersome scuba equipment on the open ocean.

Canoe diving is best suited for calm seas and fair weather. Large waves, rough water, and strong winds make canoe diving unfavorable at best and extremely dangerous at worst.

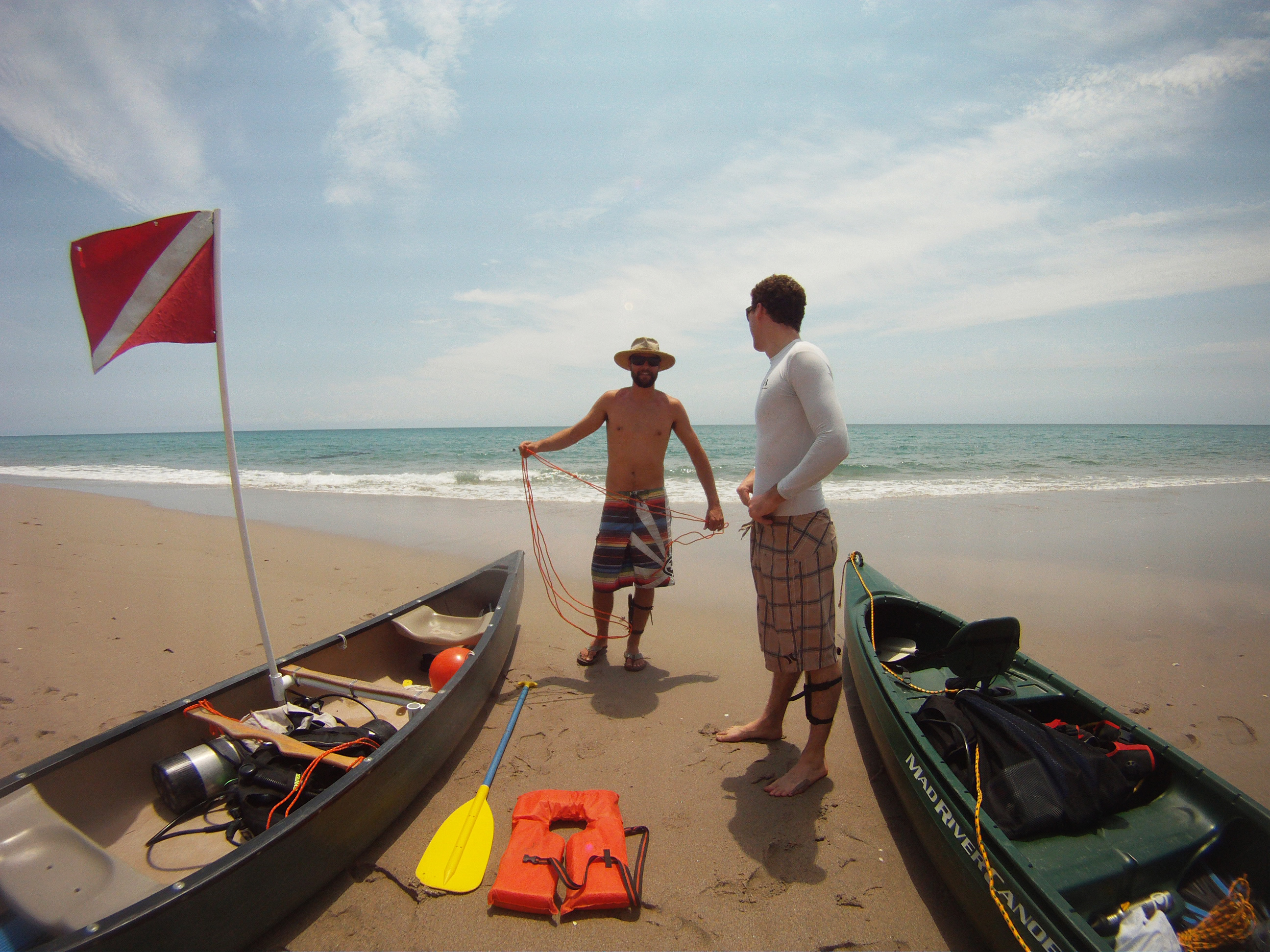
Two canoe divers preparing their scuba equipment and safety devices on a beach.

== Kayak diving history ==
Kayak diving has been done in southern California since at least the mid-1990s. More recently it is known from other countries, such as New Zealand, and to a very limited extent the United Kingdom,. One couple has been Kayak diving in Sabah, North Borneo, Malaysia since 2008 with members of the Piasau Divers club. Several dives have been made in and around the islands of the Tunku Abdul Rahman marine park. It was found that a dive-yak was perfect for diving and snorkelling. Especially since as an inflatable it could be deflated, carried out to the further islands on a powerboat and then inflated and the divers left to dive and paddle their way back home.

== Technique ==
Typically, the canoe or kayak is launched from a beach or jetty as close as conveniently possible to the intended scuba diving location. Scuba equipment is assembled ready for diving before it is loaded. The divers then carefully board the canoe or kayak, and paddle to the dive site. Navigation to the dive site may be facilitated by use of a hand-held global positioning system (GPS), or more traditional coastal navigation methods.

On reaching a dive site the lead boat drops an anchor, and the others tie on to the back or use separate anchors. The divers inflate their buoyancy compensators attached to their diving cylinders and put them into the water to float while remaining tethered to the boat. Then they put on their masks, fins, and weight belts, slide overboard, and put on their scuba sets while floating. Once the divers are ready, they descend and proceed with the dive. The boat may be tethered to the divers via their surface marker buoy system if they are drift diving, or it may be anchored or fastened to a mooring buoy if one is available at the dive site.

In places where the visibility is less than excellent it is necessary to use a guideline to find the way back to the anchor, because usually there is no boat handler on the surface to pick up the divers if they surface away from the boats.

After the dive, the divers must board the canoe or kayak without capsizing it. Small items of equipment will usually be placed into the canoe while the diver is still in the water, but the scuba set will either be passed up to a person already on board, or loaded after the diver is back on board.

Getting into a kayak is the reverse of getting off. It is relatively easy to climb onto them from the side as the freeboard is low, but they are not very stable and are easy to capsize. The diver's weights are usually removed first and secured on the boat. Other loose equipment may be loaded at this stage. The scuba set is removed and clipped to a tether. Sufficient air to float the set must be in the buoyancy compensator. The fins are kept on the feet as they are used to boost the diver onto the kayak. Boarding is usually done by holding onto the kayak and using the fins to get roughly horizontal at right angles to the boat, then boosting over the kayak so that the hips are over the cockpit, face down, then rolling face up and sitting before swinging the legs onto the boat.

The scuba set can then be carefully hoisted out of the water and stowed. Most divers will probably have to adjust their position for this maneuver.

== Equipment ==
=== Kayaks ===
Kayaks suitable for diving are available in a range of styles. Single seaters and tandems. Long, narrow boats track better, are faster and less effort to paddle, but can be clumsy in surf. Shorter, wider boats are more stable and maneuverable, and can be easier to manage in surf, but usually carry less weight.

Sit-on-top kayaks are usually chosen for diving. Inflatable or rigid, they are generally relatively wide, and therefore provide greater stability, which is important when loading or unloading dive gear, and for boarding from the water. A moulded cargo well behind the cockpit is suitable for carrying the scuba set. This is provided with straps to secure the gear. Sealed hatches can provide storage space for other equipment, or it can be carried in another moulded cargo well in a bag or net. Some hatches are large enough to store an extra cylinder. A paddle is required, and is usually tethered to the boat so it can't be lost. Optional backrests can make paddling more comfortable.

Until the late 2000s a purpose built inflatable dive kayak, the "DiveYak", was built by Sevylor. This came in two models - a single and double. The single was 0.8m in width and the double wider and more stable at 1m. The Diveyak was an excellent boat and could easily carry two divers and gear in an extremely stable platform that was simple to dive from and very rugged.

Today many fishing kayaks are available that have the stability and buoyancy to act as diving kayaks. An example is "Finn", a small manufacturer in Perth, Australia. "Feelfree" and other brands also make suitable kayaks.

== Safety ==
Most canoe and kayak diving is close to the shore at distances that would be easy to shore-dive had there been reasonable shore access.

It is an important legal requirement to fly a 'diver down flag' while diving to indicate that it is not an abandoned vessel and that there are divers underwater. In the UK, with its low water temperatures, strong tidal currents and changeable weather, an empty boat at sea is likely to be reported to HM Coastguard by experienced and responsible seafarers as a sign of a possible life-threatening emergency. As it is the Coastguard's duty to investigate such reports, they may order a search of the area by an RNLI lifeboat or Coastguard helicopter. Similar laws may apply in other countries. To reach the minimum acceptable level of safety when boat diving, a capable person should be left on the surface at the dive site while divers are underwater, to start a rescue and operate a marine VHF radio to raise the alarm in the event of a diving accident whenever there is no easily accessible shore exit.

=== Hazards ===
Weather and sea conditions may deteriorate while the divers are underwater.

=== Safety equipment ===
Safety equipment required depends on the jurisdiction.

A VHF radio or cell phone may be carried to call for help in case of an emergency, a hand-held sonar "fishfinder" can be used to show the bottom contour of the site and a hand held GPS may be used to navigate to and from the site.

An anchor may be used to moor the boat during the dive, or if conditions allow, it may be towed as a large surface marker buoy.

Safety equipment may be required by legislation. This may include lifejacket or personal buoyancy aid, dive flag, flares, water bottle, mirror, whistle, an EPIRB or PLB locator beacon or hand held VHF radio..

A light outrigger can make the canoe or kayak much more stable. This is an advantage when boarding from the water and when pulling tanks back on board.

==== Florida, USA ====
The following is a summary of regulations found in Chapters 327 and 328 of Florida Statutes which pertain to diving from small boats.

1. The size of divers-down flags displayed on vessels must be at least 20 inches by 24 inches, and a stiffener is required to keep the flag unfurled. Dive flags carried on floats must be at least 12 inches by 12 inches. Also, divers-down flags on vessels must be displayed above the vessel's highest point so that the flag's visibility is not obstructed in any direction.
2. Divers must make reasonable efforts to stay within 300 feet of a divers-down flag on open waters (all waterways other than rivers, inlets, or navigation channels) and within 100 feet of a flag within rivers, inlets, or navigation channels.
3. When all divers are out of the water, a dive flag may not be displayed.
4. The owner and/or operator of a vessel is responsible to carry, store, maintain and use the safety equipment required by the U.S. Coast Guard (USCG).
5. All vessels are required to have on board a wearable USCG-approved personal flotation device (PFD) for each person. The PFDs must be of the appropriate size for the intended wearer, be in serviceable condition, and within easy access.
6. All vessels are required to carry an efficient sound-producing device, such as a referee's whistle.
7. Vessels less than 16 feet in length are required to carry at least 3 visual distress signals approved for nighttime use when on coastal waters from sunset to sunrise. Vessels 16 feet or longer must carry at least 3 daytime and three nighttime visual distress signals (or 3 combination daytime/nighttime signals) at all times when on coastal waters.
8. The use of sirens or flashing, occulting or revolving lights is prohibited except where expressly allowed by law.
9. Recreational vessels are required to display navigation lights between sunset and sunrise and during periods of reduced visibility (fog, rain, haze, etc.). The U.S. Coast Guard Navigation Rules specify lighting requirements for every description of watercraft.

== See also ==
- Canoeing – Activity of paddling a canoe
- Drift diving – Scuba diving where the diver is intentionally transported by the water flow
- Dive boat – Boat used for the support of scuba diving operations
- International maritime signal flags – Flags used for naval communication
- Kayaking – Use of a kayak on water
- Scuba diving – Swimming underwater, breathing gas carried by the diver
- Sea kayak – Light boat that is paddled
