= Carmellan Research =

British manufacturer of diving rebreathers

Carmellan Research is or was a firm who developed automatic rebreathers for scuba diving. It was run by Stuart Clough.

Their address was Carmellan Research Ltd, 11 Hillside Close, Ellington, Huntingdon, England.

They developed the SMS2000 and Phibian rebreathers.
