= Built-in breathing system =

System for supply of breathing gas on demand within a confined space

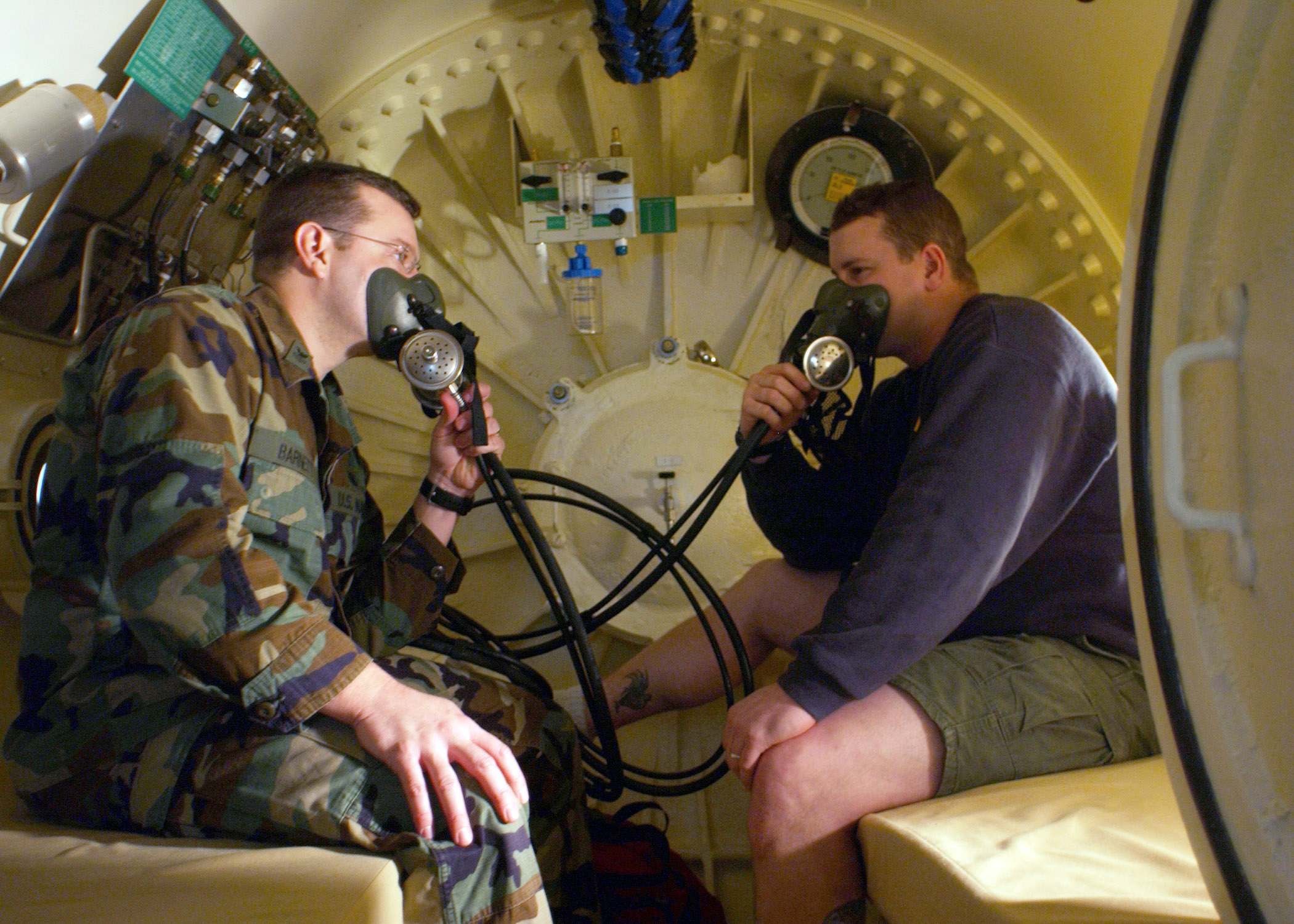
Navy divers testing the built-in breathing masks inside a recompression chamber

A built-in breathing system is a source of breathing gas installed in a confined space where an alternative to the ambient gas may be required for medical treatment, emergency use, or to minimise a hazard. They are found in diving chambers, hyperbaric treatment chambers, and submarines.

The use in hyperbaric treatment chambers is usually to supply an oxygen rich treatment gas which if used as the chamber atmosphere, would constitute an unacceptable fire hazard. In this application the exhaust gas is vented outside of the chamber. In saturation diving chambers and surface decompression chamber the application is similar, but a further function is a supply of breathable gas in case of toxic contamination of the chamber atmosphere. This function does not require external venting, but the same equipment is typically used for supply of oxygen enriched gases, so they are generally vented to the exterior.

In submarines the function is to supply a breathable gas in an emergency, which may be contamination of the ambient internal atmosphere, or flooding. In this application venting to the interior is both acceptable and generally the only feasible option, as the exterior is typically at a higher pressure than the interior, and external venting is not possible by passive means.

== Function ==
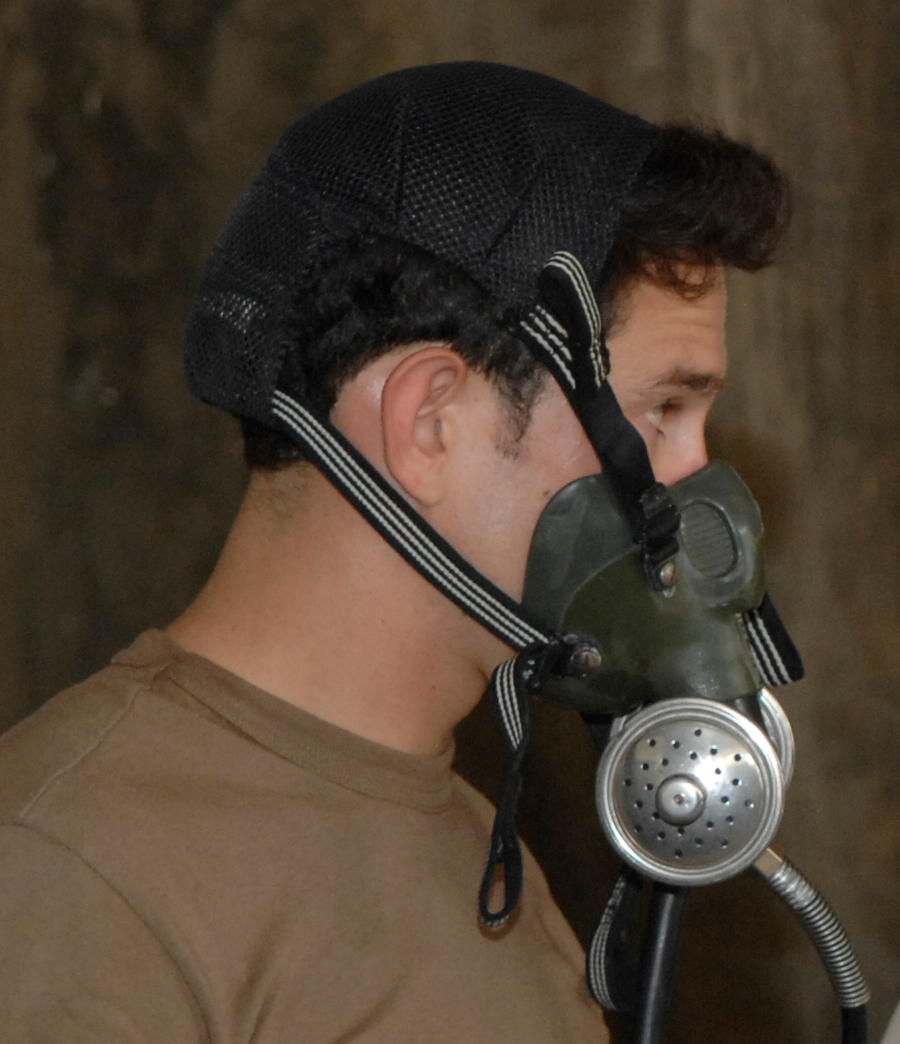
Side view of BIBS mask supported by straps

=== Externally vented BIBS ===
These are systems used to supply breathing gas on demand in a chamber which is at a pressure greater than the ambient pressure outside the chamber. The pressure difference between chamber and external ambient pressure makes it possible to exhaust the exhaled gas to the external environment, but the flow must be controlled so that only exhaled gas is vented through the system, and it does not drain the contents of the chamber to the outside. This is achieved by using a controlled exhaust valve which opens when a slight over-pressure relative to the chamber pressure on the exhaust diaphragm moves the valve mechanism against a spring. When this over-pressure is dissipated by the gas flowing out through the exhaust hose, the spring returns this valve to the closed position, cutting off further flow, and conserving the chamber atmosphere. A negative or zero pressure difference over the exhaust diaphragm will keep it closed. The exhaust diaphragm is exposed to the chamber pressure on one side, and exhaled gas pressure in the oro-nasal mask on the other side. The supply of gas for inhalation is through a demand valve which works on the same principles as a regular diving demand valve second stage. Like any other breathing apparatus, the dead space must be limited to minimise carbon dioxide buildup in the mask.

In some cases the outlet suction must be limited and a back-pressure regulator may be required. This would usually be the case for use in a saturation system. Use for oxygen therapy and surface decompression on oxygen would not generally need a back-pressure regulator. When an externally vented BIBS is used at low chamber pressure, a vacuum assist may be necessary to keep the exhalation backpressure down to provide an acceptable work of breathing.

The oro-nasal mask may be interchangeable for hygienic use by different people.

Some models are rated for pressures up to 450 msw.

The major application for this type of BIBS is supply of breathing gas with a different composition to the chamber atmosphere to occupants of a hyperbaric chamber where the chamber atmosphere is controlled, and contamination by the BIBS gas would be a problem. This is common in therapeutic decompression, and hyperbaric oxygen therapy, where a higher partial pressure of oxygen in the chamber would constitute an unacceptable fire hazard, and would require frequent ventilation of the chamber to keep the partial pressure within acceptable limits Frequent ventilation is noisy and expensive, but can be used in an emergency. It is also necessary that the BIBS gas is not contaminated by chamber gas, as this could adversely affect decompression.

When this format of BIBS is fitted it can also be used for emergency breathing gas supply in the event of contaminated chamber atmosphere, though in those cases the contamination by exhaled BIBS gas would usually not be important.

=== Locally vented BIBS ===
When contamination of the internal atmosphere is not important, and where the external ambient pressure is higher than in the occupied space, exhaled gas is simply dumped into the internal volume, requiring no special flow control beyond a simple non-return valve. The delivery and exhaust mechanism of a BIBS demand valve for this application is the same as for a scuba or SCBA second stage regulator, and these can be used for this purpose with little or no modification. This type of breathing apparatus may also use a full-face mask for delivery.

In some monoplace medical chambers the chamber atmosphere is continuously flushed by a continuous air supply venting to ambient atmosphere through an overpressure valve. This allows the use of standard disposable medical plastic oxygen masks to provide oxygen to the occupant, which is vented to the interior of the chamber.

== Applications ==
=== Hyperbaric oxygen therapy ===
The traditional type of hyperbaric chamber used for therapeutic recompression and hyperbaric oxygen therapy is a rigid shelled pressure vessel. Such chambers can be run at absolute pressures typically about 6 bars (87 psi), 600,000 Pa or more in special cases. Navies, professional diving organizations, hospitals, and dedicated recompression facilities typically operate these. They range in size from semi-portable, one-patient units to room-sized units that can treat eight or more patients. They may be rated for lower pressures if not primarily intended for treatment of diving injuries.

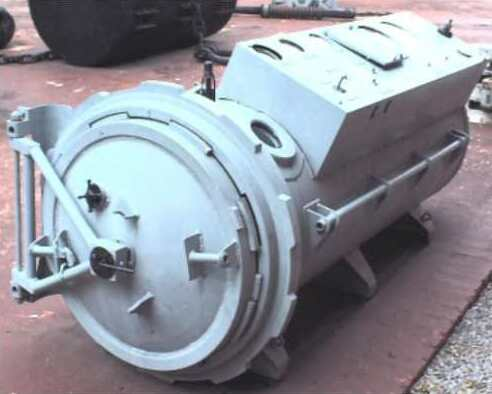
A recompression chamber for a single diving casualty

In the larger multiplace chambers, patients inside the chamber breathe from either "oxygen hoods" – flexible, transparent soft plastic hoods with a seal around the neck similar to a space suit helmet – or tightly fitting oxygen masks, which supply pure oxygen and may be designed to directly exhaust the exhaled gas from the chamber. During treatment patients breathe 100% oxygen most of the time to maximise the effectiveness of their treatment, but have periodic "air breaks" during which they breathe chamber air (21% oxygen) to reduce the risk of oxygen toxicity. The exhaled treatment gas must be removed from the chamber to prevent the buildup of oxygen, which could present a fire risk. Attendants may also breathe oxygen some of the time to reduce their risk of decompression sickness when they leave the chamber. The pressure inside the chamber is increased by opening valves allowing high-pressure air to enter from storage cylinders, which are filled by an air compressor. Chamber air oxygen content is kept between 19% and 23% to control fire risk (US Navy maximum 25%). If the chamber does not have a scrubber system to remove carbon dioxide from the chamber gas, the chamber must be isobarically ventilated to keep the CO_{2} within acceptable limits.

=== Therapeutic recompression ===
Hyperbaric oxygen therapy was developed as a treatment for diving disorders involving bubbles of gas in the tissues, such as decompression sickness and gas embolism, and it is still considered the definitive treatment for these conditions. The recompression treats decompression sickness and gas embolism by increasing pressure, which reduces the size of the gas bubbles and improves the transport of blood to downstream tissues. Elimination of the inert component of the breathing gas by breathing oxygen provides a stronger concentration gradient to eliminate dissolved inert gas still in the tissues, and further accelerates bubble reduction by dissolving the gas back into the blood. After elimination of bubbles, the pressure is gradually reduced back to atmospheric levels. The raised oxygen partial pressures in the blood may also help recovery of oxygen-starved tissues downstream of the blockages.

Emergency treatment for decompression illness follows schedules laid out in treatment tables. Most treatments recompress to 2.8 bars (41 psi) absolute, the equivalent of 18 metres (60 ft) of water, for 4.5 to 5.5 hours with the casualty breathing pure oxygen, but taking periodic air breaks to reduce oxygen toxicity. For serious cases resulting from very deep dives, the treatment may require a chamber capable of a maximum pressure of 8 bars (120 psi), the equivalent of 70 metres (230 ft) of water, and the ability to supply heliox and nitrox as a breathing gas.

=== Surface decompression ===
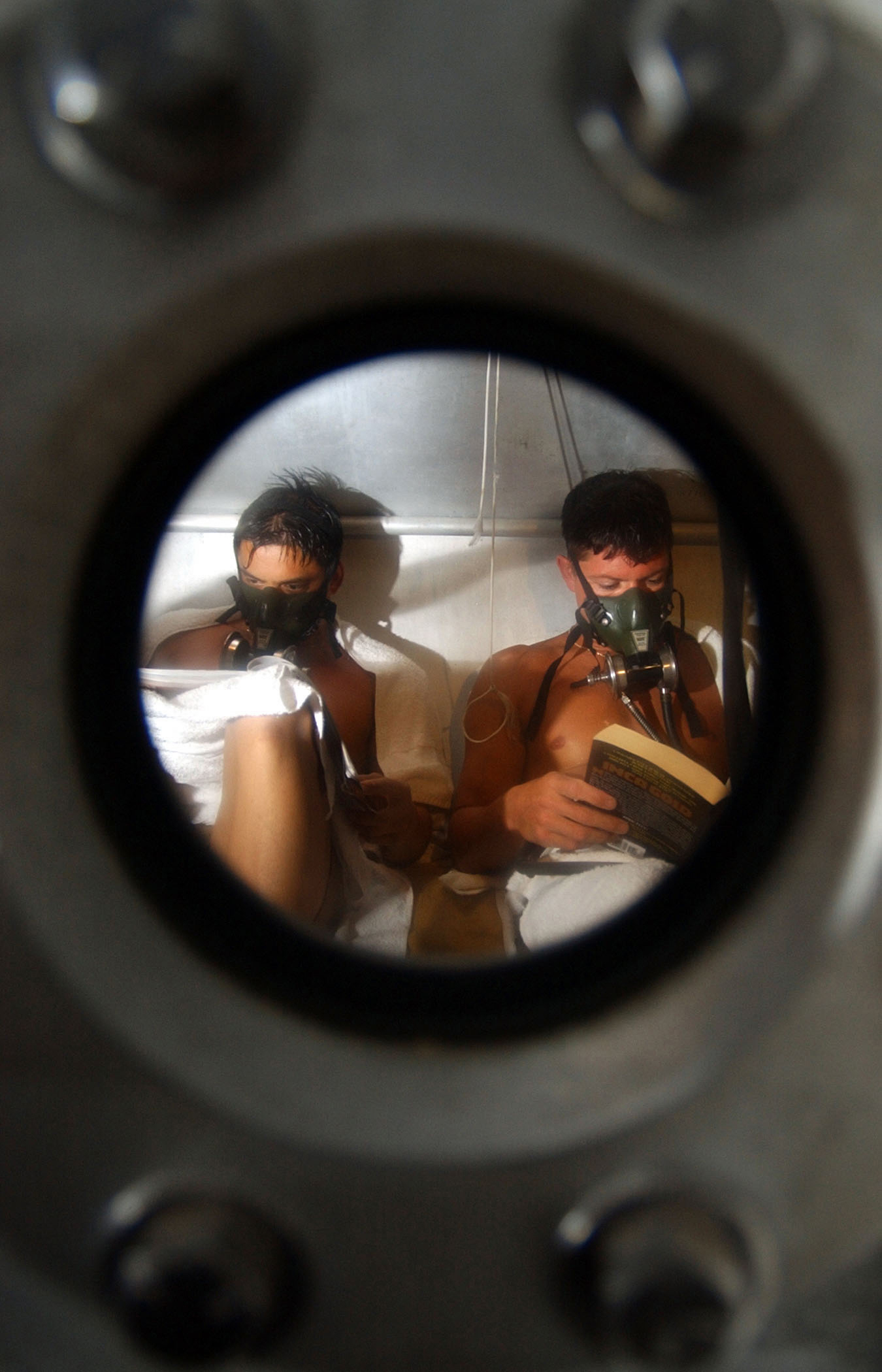
Divers breathing oxygen in the chamber after a 240 feet (73 m) dive

Surface decompression is a procedure in which some or all of the staged decompression obligation is done in a decompression chamber instead of in the water. This reduces the time that the diver spends in the water, exposed to environmental hazards such as cold water or currents, which will enhance diver safety. The decompression in the chamber is more controlled, in a more comfortable environment, and oxygen can be used at greater partial pressure as there is no risk of drowning and a lower risk of oxygen toxicity convulsions. A further operational advantage is that once the divers are in the chamber, new divers can be supplied from the diving panel, and the operations can continue with less delay.

A typical surface decompression procedure is described in the US Navy Diving Manual. If there is no in-water 40 ft stop required the diver is surfaced directly. Otherwise, all required decompression up to and including the 40 ft (12 m) stop is completed in-water. The diver is then surfaced and pressurised in a chamber to 50 fsw (15 msw) within 5 minutes of leaving 40 ft depth in the water. If this "surface interval" from 40 ft in the water to 50 fsw in the chamber exceeds 5 minutes, a penalty is incurred, as this indicates a higher risk of DCS symptoms developing, so longer decompression is required.

In the case where the diver is successfully recompressed within the nominal interval, he will be decompressed according to the schedule in the air decompression tables for surface decompression, preferably on oxygen, which is used from 50 fsw (15 msw), a partial pressure of 2.5 bar. The duration of the 50 fsw stop is 15 minutes for the Revision 6 tables. The chamber is then decompressed to 40 fsw (12 msw) for the next stage of up to 4 periods of 30 minutes each on oxygen. A stop may also be done at 30 fsw (9 msw), for further periods on oxygen according to the schedule. Air breaks of 5 minutes are taken at the end of each 30 minutes of oxygen breathing.

=== Saturation systems emergency gas supply ===
During decompression from saturation, a pressure will be reached where raising the oxygen concentration further would cause an unacceptable fire hazard, while keeping it at an acceptable level for fire risk would be inefficient for decompression. BIBS supply of breathing gas with higher oxygen content than the chamber atmosphere can solve this problem. If the atmosphere in a saturation habitat is contaminated, the inhabitants can use the available BIBS masks during the emergency and be supplied with non-contaminated breathing gas until the problem has been solved.

=== Submarine emergency gas supply ===
Submarine BIBS systems are intended to provide the crew with diving quality air or nitrox breathing gas in an emergency escape situation where the interior may be partly or completely flooded, and may be at a significantly higher than atmospheric pressure.

The supply gas is provided from a high pressure storage bank at a pressure automatically compensated for internal ambient pressure and is distributed around the vessel to points where the breathing units can be connected as required.
