= Submarine Products =

Former British diving equipment manufacturer and distributor

Submarine Products Ltd.
- Company type: Limited company
- Founded: 1959
- Founder: Hugh Oswell
- Defunct: 1990
- Headquarters: Hexham, England
- Products: Diving equipment
- Brands: Sealion, Aquarius

Submarine Products Ltd (1959−1990) was a diving gear manufacturer, with a factory in Hexham in Northumberland, England. It was founded in 1959 by Lieutenant-Commander Hugh Oswell.

Until the late 1950s, the British Siebe Gorman company patents kept aqualungs expensive in Britain, and many British sport divers had to use home-made breathing sets and ex-armed forces or ex-industry rebreathers. Some became expert at home-making scuba diving demand regulators from industrial parts such as Calor Gas regulators.

In 1959 Hugh Oswell designed around the Cousteau-Gagnan patent and made sport diving breathing sets accessibly inexpensive. Submarine Products Ltd were the first company to make scuba sets readily available to the public in the United Kingdom. They developed a unique diver delivery vehicle (the Subskimmer), and were important for introducing high quality plastics (e.g. ABS) into the manufacture of underwater breathing apparatus. For many years they supplied their Black Prince regulators and other open circuit equipment to the Royal Navy. When the British Navy decided to purchase foreign competitors' closed circuit equipment, imports became increasingly difficult. After financial difficulties, Submarine Products Ltd ceased in 1990.

== History ==
=== 1950s ===
According to the Classic Dive Books website, "In the mid-1950s Lt Cdr Hugh Oswell was a serving officer in the Royal Navy at Portsmouth and in his spare time, he was working on improvements and modifications to existing underwater breathing equipment – even developing his own designs. He was assisted in producing his prototypes by Harry Biscoe who was also based at Portsmouth but had access to engineering facilities. Some time later, Oswell was posted to Tyneside as liaison officer at Swan Hunter shipyards. In 1957, the Royal Navy introduced staff reductions and Oswell took a redundancy package and that finances his new business venture Submarine Products based at Acomb near Hexham in Northumberland in the UK. Harry Biscoe was offered a job which he kept for the life of the company".

1955. July: According to the Hong Kong Commerce and Industry Department Trade Bulletin, "A brand new Hong Kong product is (...) underwater swimming equipment (...). Marketed under the registered name of 'Sealion', this equipment, designed by a British engineer, functions on the well-proven compressed air system and incorporates several original features (patents applied for) which are said to make breathing easier and mean fewer moving parts. The manufacturers claim that in price, the 'Sealion' compares favourably with similar equipment produced elsewhere. This, combined with its improved design, should make it popular with overseas buyers. A model shown at the recent Canadian International Trade Fair attracted considerable attention. There are several variations of the 'Sealion' and full details can be obtained from the manufacturers, Submarine Products Limited, 32 Printing House, Duddell Street, Hong Kong." This is the first known reference to either the "Sealion" regulator or the "Submarine Products" company. The "British engineer" in the article was presumably Hugh Oswell.

1957. May: An advertisement appears in the British Sub-Aqua Club journal Triton, describing Hugh Oswell’s "Sealion" regulator as "widely popular in Australia because of these outstanding features: Simplicity - only 4 moving parts; Safety - 2-way mouthpiece valves fitted in Super-flex spiral breathing tubes; Efficiency - Built-in reserve". According to the 1957 underwater catalogue of the London sporting goods store Lillywhites and the CG-45.com double-hose regulator collection website, at least 500 Sealion Mark I regulators were imported to Australia by Bob Wallace-Mitchell of Melbourne, a keen Victorian spearfisherman and distributor of Porpoise diving equipment for Ted Eldred, who designed the world's first single-hose regulator. In this May 1957 Triton advertisement, Andrews & Dalton of 126 Hanworth Road in Hounslow, Middlesex offers the Sealion regulator complete with cylinder and harness at £22 10s 0d. July: J. G. Fenn Ltd. of Stoke on Trent charges the same amount for this kit while pricing Typhoon, Siebe Gorman and Heinke scuba sets at £26 12s 6d, £40 and £42 respectively.

1958. September: Operating from Andrews & Dalton’s Hounslow address, Underwater Sports Ltd launches Mark II "Sealion Aqualung" incorporating "a yoke fitting for standard cylinders, pressure gauge take-off and peripheral holes for easier exhalation".

1959. July: Submarine Products Ltd., "makers of 'Sealion' diving equipment", which now trades from Andrews & Dalton’s Hounslow address, introduces the "Aquamobile" underwater scooter "powered by an ordinary 12-volt car battery". September: Submarine Products Ltd. represents French diving equipment manufacturer Beuchat of Marseille as "sole agent" within Britain for Tarzan double-skinned isoprene wetsuits, which "are standard equipment with the French Navy". November: Submarine Products Ltd. moves to Acomb House in Hexham, Northumberland.

=== 1960s ===
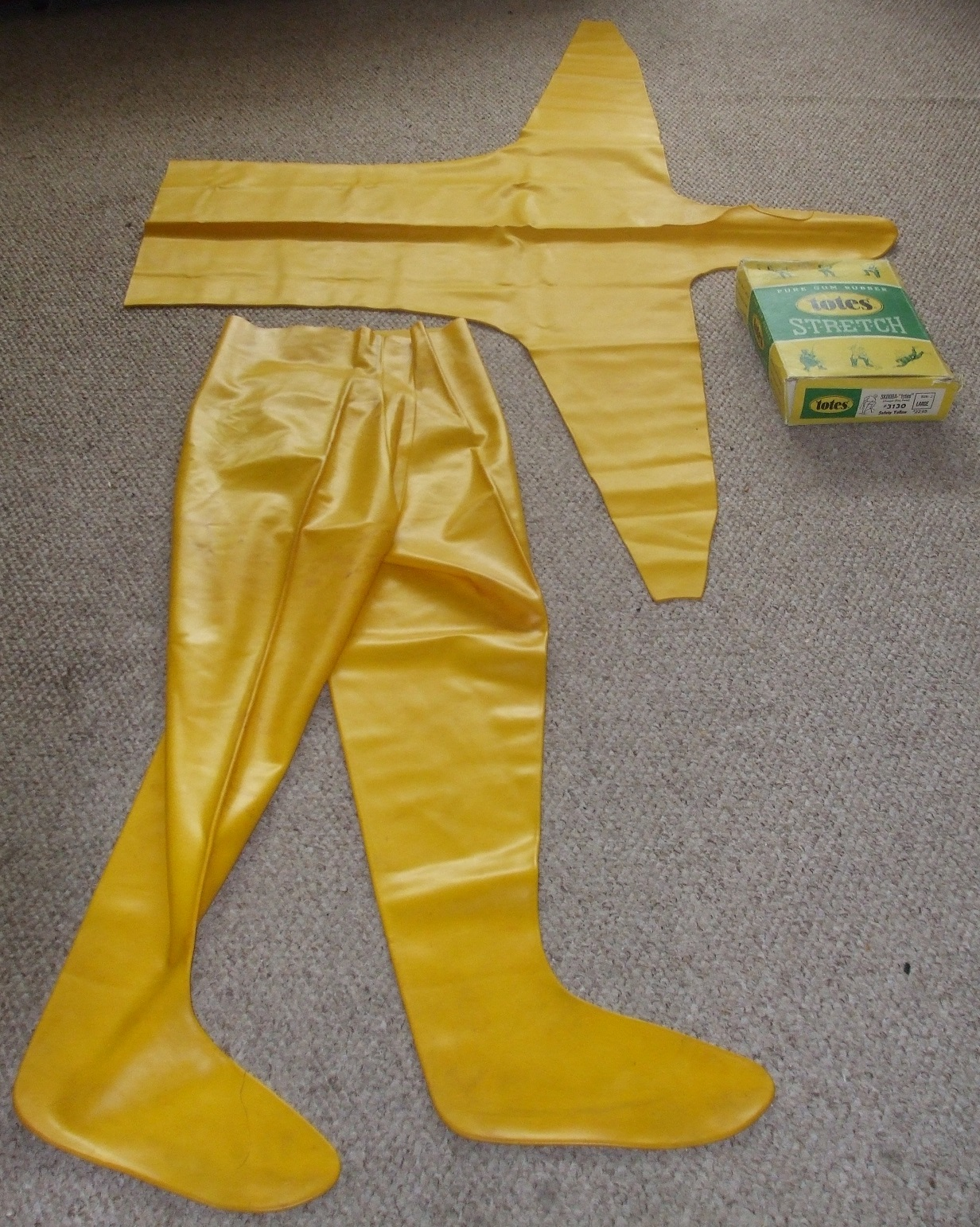
Skooba-"totes" dry suit imported in 1960 by Submarine Products Ltd.

1960. March: Submarine Products offers "a complete range of equipment for the discerning diver", namely Sealion breathing apparatus with the Mark III regulator, Tarzan suits, fins, knives, masks, spearguns and the Aquamobile, "the world’s finest water scooter". May: The company launches the Sealion Atlantic scuba set "incorporating the revolutionary Venturi action in the mouthpiece and completely eliminating the flooded hose hazard" while recommending the purchase of Tarzan Espadon (Beuchat) diving accessories “for quality and value”. November: The firm’s product range includes Espadon "Aquacetera", namely a compensator mask, a stainless-steel knife, safety-yellow full-foot fins and a flexible rubber snorkel; American Skooba-"totes" dry suits made by So-Lo Marx of Loveland, Ohio, to complement French Tarzan wetsuits made by Beuchat of Marseille; the firm’s own Atlantic regulator and Aquamobile underwater scooter "to add the thrill of speed".

1961. March: Submarine Products announces "an amazing development in weight belts", namely a diver’s weight-belt with screw-in weights and quick-release mechanism. The design is awarded French patent FR1314235 towards the end of the following year.

1962. January: Submarine Products introduces a plunger pressure gauge. March: The firm’s first but undated 16-page catalogue highlights Atlantic and Super Sealion breathing sets and accessories; Tarzan masks, fins, snorkels, spearguns, knives and neoprene wetsuits; Skooba-"totes" brown and yellow gum-rubber dry suits; Cristal torches and flood lamps; Triton diving instruments; and Bauer portable compressors. May: “Green label” Atlantic twin set. July: Underwater lamp with 100-watt tungsten-iodine bulb.

1964. Submarine Products releases a second 16-page catalogue with the year of issue on the front cover. New products include: a triple cylinder set; a dial pressure gauge and a depth gauge; Jetfins and Super Tarzan lined wetsuits from France, dark-green Skooba-“totes” dry suits, the "world’s finest", from the USA; the Aquamobile submarine built for two or three divers wearing breathing apparatus and the 300-watt underwater lantern. The catalogue also announces the publication of a "complete and comprehensive guide to all aspects of skin diving".

1966. The company brings out a new undated 12-page catalogue resembling the 1964 version but dispensing with the “professional range” comprising the Aquamobile submarine, Bauer compressor and underwater lantern.

1967. Submarine Products moves into new purpose-built premises complete with test tanks and a pressure chamber at Bridge End in Hexham. Business diversifies into manufacturing moulded plastic products ranging from boat hulls to breathing equipment for divers and firefighters. The firm exports widely, supplying underwater gear to the Australian, Indian, Korean and Jordanian navies.

1969. April: Submarine Products introduces its last double-hose regulator, the "Black Prince", to create a floating scuba set with a “scientifically shaped” back harness and an aluminium compressed air cylinder. The company releases another undated 12-page catalogue with a safety buoy and a budget wetsuit as new Tarzan lines, but without the Skooba-"totes" dry suit, which is no longer made in the USA.

=== 1970s ===
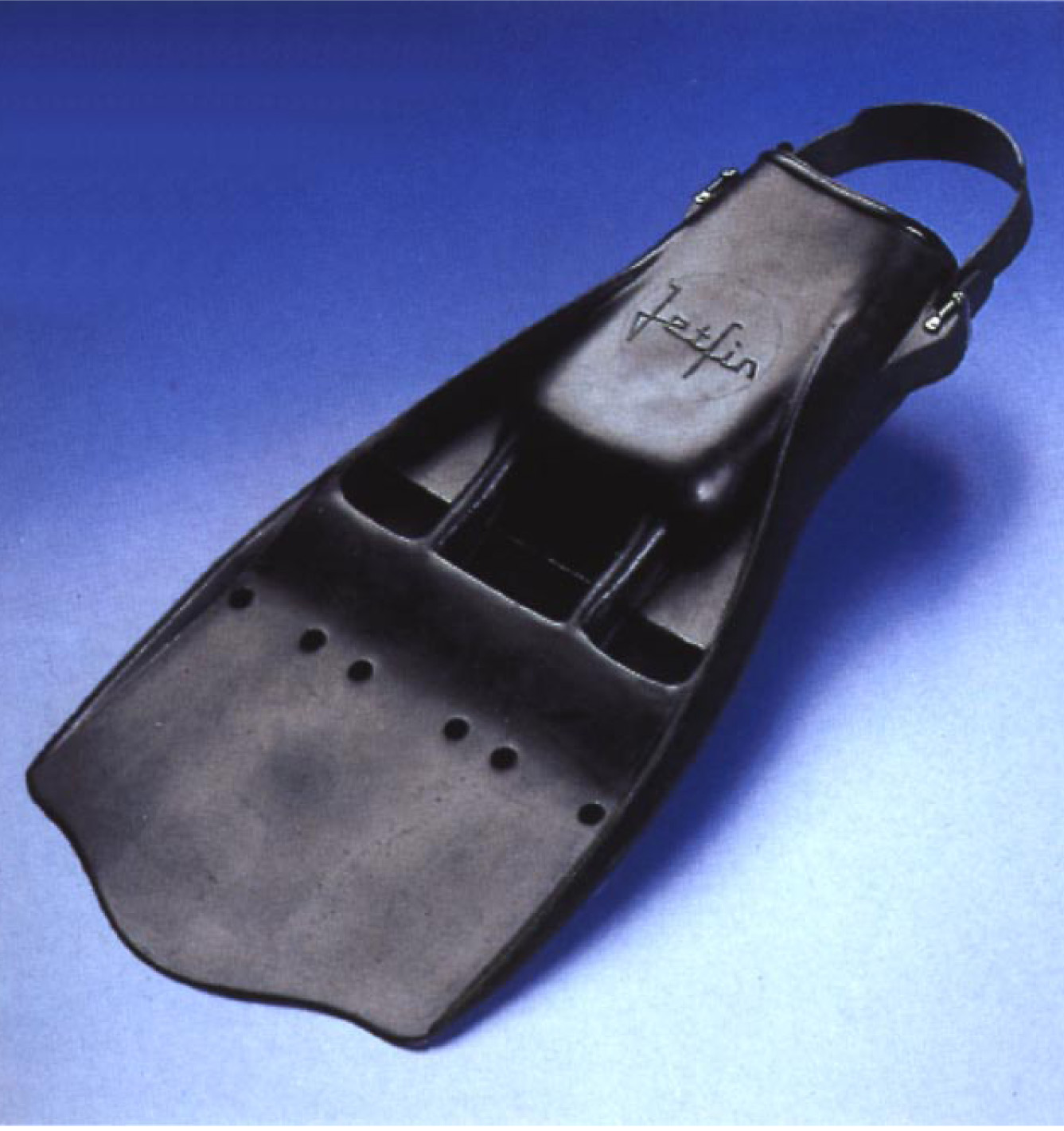
Beuchat Jetfin imported in 1972 by Submarine Products Ltd.

1972. February: Submarine Products deploys the slogan "Even the Navy put their foot in it" to boost sales of its imported Beuchat Jetfins "used extensively by the American and French navies as well as the Royal Navy". August: Submarine Products introduces its first single-hose regulator with "the new name in diving, Aquarius", which also becomes a registered trademark of the company. The Aquarius product range initially comprises the single-hose regulator and a diver’s torch.

1973. July: Submarine Products launches the Aquarius Mark II single-hose regulator with adjustable neckband, exhaust deflector and the option of lightweight steel or aluminium cylinders and a convertible backpack harness to complete the scuba set. The Aquarius range now includes a wetsuit and a petrol-driven aqua scooter for surface use. November: An underwater cine camera case joins the range.

1974. September: Aquarius 2000 demand valve "designed with safety in mind but still with superb styling. Fully downstreamed with piston first stage. This regulator also has a screw-off front for easy access and a brand new flow control knob for adjusting breathing resistance to the diver’s own requirements."

1976. November: Submarine Products introduces its "second-generation" Aquarius A.B.L.J. with a "really effective dump valve, high up to give virtually instant braking in rapid ascent."

=== 1980s ===
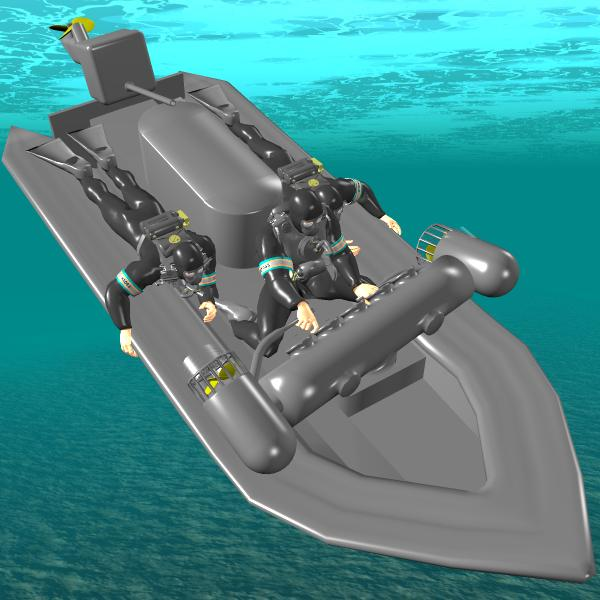
CGI image of three frogmen riding a Subskimmer underwater.

1980. The company publishes a brochure with the mission statement “Our aim is to produce gear of a professional standard which nevertheless is neither too costly nor too complex for the sports diver to use”, adding, “We have recently re-equipped the Royal Navy and the Royal Engineers with diving apparatus. Similar diving sets can be bought in shops as far apart as the Solomon Islands and Singapore, Osaka and Geneva. Submarine Products now manufactures a wider range of underwater equipment than any other British manufacturer.” The accompanying price list comes with the then new Aquarius 3000 single-hose regulator and with the Black Prince double-hose regulator launched in 1969. The Aquarius range now includes a full-face mask, while Beuchat sub continues to supply other masks, snorkels, Jetfins and knives to complete the collection.

1982. March: New Scientist publishes an illustrated article entitled "Powerboat that gets a sinking feeling." The piece begins: "The crew of this boat seems to be taking emergency action after a nasty puncture. In fact, this fast inflatable is in the process of being converted into a submarine. Hugh Oswell of Submarine Products at Hexham, Northumbria (sic) designed the Subskimmer for commandos attacking ships or harbours from the sea". According to the CG-45.com website, "the cost of developing this project was phenomenal, and the company grew financially. Commander Oswell was confident that these costs would be covered by a contract with the Royal Navy, but that did not happen". H. I. Sutton’s website provides further information about the Submarine Products military range of underwater craft and rebreathers.

Mid-1980s. Submarine Products bids to continue supplying the Royal Navy but loses the contract to rival company Sabre Air Products.

1988. In the New Year Honours List, Managing Director of Submarine Products Ltd. Hugh Henry Bayley Oswell is appointed Member of the Order of the British Empire (MBE).

1989. June: Submarine Products goes into receivership, ceasing to trade altogether in 1990.

== Patents ==
During the 1960s, 1970s and 1980s, several American, British, French, German and Italian patent applications were filed on behalf of Submarine Products Ltd.:

- FR1314235 (published 26 November 1962): Ceinture de lestage pour plongeur. The drawings accompanying this French patent show the prototype of the Submarine Products SEALION weight belt, which enables divers to adjust their buoyancy by screwing weights on or off, without removing the belt.
- GB1315047 (published 26 April 1973): Transportation means. This British patent protects the invention of a toy truck designed to transport a child in a sitting position along a track with a rack formation. No evidence of concept entering production stage.
- GB1506865 (published 12 April 1978): Improvements in or relating to valve assemblies. This British patent relates to valve assemblies particularly, but not exclusively, for use with high-pressure cylinders used in diving apparatus.
- GB2015348 (filed 23 February 1979): Underwater breathing apparatus. This British patent application relates to closed-circuit underwater breathing apparatus.
- DE2907416 (filed 26 February 1979): Unterwasser-Atmungsgerät. This German patent application relates to underwater breathing apparatus described in British patent application GB2015348.
- FR2418148 (filed 27 February 1979): Appareil respiratoire sous-marin. This French patent application relates to underwater breathing apparatus described in British patent application GB2015348.
- IT1114975B (filed 27 February 1979): Perfezionamento negli apparecchi di respirazione subacquea. This Italian patent application relates to underwater breathing apparatus described in British patent application GB2015348.
- US4273120 (filed 27 February 1979): Underwater breathing apparatus. This American patent application relates to underwater breathing apparatus described in British patent application GB2015348.
- GB2075848 (filed 19 May 1981): Demand valve. This British patent application relates to a demand valve, or regulator, used in underwater breathing apparatus.
- US4411285 (published 25 October 1983): Demand valve. This American patent relates to a demand valve, or regulator, used in underwater breathing apparatus described in British patent application GB2075848.

== See also ==
- Underwater diving equipment manufacturers
