= Subskimmer =

Submersible diver propulsion vehicle with inflatable buoyancy for surface use

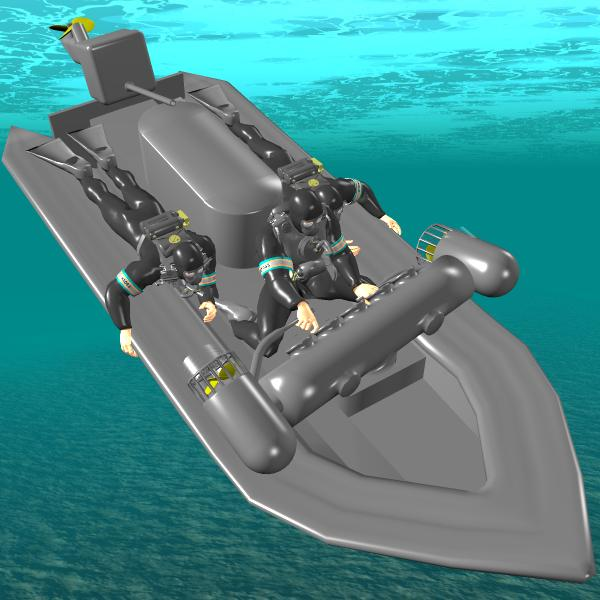
Computer-generated image of three frogmen riding a Subskimmer underwater. Their breathing sets are the Siebe Gorman CDBA.

The Subskimmer is a diver propulsion vehicle which is a form of rigid inflatable boat (RIB) with an outboard petrol (gasoline) engine. It is equipped to inflate and deflate itself as it runs. When submerged it seals its engine and runs with battery-electric thrusters, which are on a rotatable cross-arm, and is deflated. Thus it transforms between a fast light surface boat and a submerged diver propulsion vehicle. The central box contains the pump to deflate and inflate the tubes, and a miscellaneous kit. The batteries, being heavy, are in a thick tube along its keel. Its outboard motor has a long snorkel so the Subskimmer can run on motor just submerged to try to avoid detection. Its thrusters are on a rotatable cross-arm which contains navigation kit.

The Subskimmer project was started in the late 1970s by Submarine Products Ltd. of Hexham in Northumberland in England, the first boats being sold in their original form in 1983/84.

There are 3 photographs of a working Subskimmer demonstrated in Portsmouth, in the 15 September 1983 edition of the Daily Telegraph newspaper; the caption states its range as 6 miles (9.7 km) at 2 knots (3.7 km/h) underwater and 100 nautical miles (190 km) at 20 knots (37 km/h) on the surface. Submarine Products Ltd also built an orange search and rescue version of Subskimmer called Seasearcher with high intensity submersible spotlights fitted.

When Submarine Products Ltd closed down, Subskimmer (as at 1989) was made by Defence Boats Ltd, based in Hexham.

At December 1992 it was being made (renamed Kraken 90) by Serrico, who were based at Saint-Georges-du-Vièvre in Normandy in France.

In 1993 KSA (Underwater) Ltd in Alston in Cumbria, England bought all rights to the Subskimmer. KSA (Underwater) Ltd gave some marketing rights to Alpha Champ Marine Products Ltd, who defaulted on payment for the rights and all agreements with them subsequently lapsed. Alpha Champ Marine Products Ltd ceased to trade in 2007 and was dissolved in 2009.

In 2009, Special Products division of Marine Specialised Technology Limited bought KSA (Underwater) Ltd along with all rights to its product range including Subtug and Subskimmer Submersible Craft, and moved all production to its manufacturing facility in Liverpool where it already designs and manufactures surface craft for military and commercial applications.

As of December 2014, it appears that Subskimmers are being made in Indonesia for its armed forces.

== Users ==
Subskimmers are used by:

- The Royal Thai Navy Marine Corps

== Other uses of the name ==
The word "subskimmer" has been found on the WWW used also (incorrectly, as it is a registered trade name) to mean:

- An Exocet-type anti-ship missile.
- As a generic referring to the Infernus a Subskimmer-like boat that was designed and made by students at KTH in Sweden in academic year 2003–2004. Its introduction refers to denna (this) subskimmer, Infernus.
