= Scuba set =

Self-contained underwater breathing apparatus

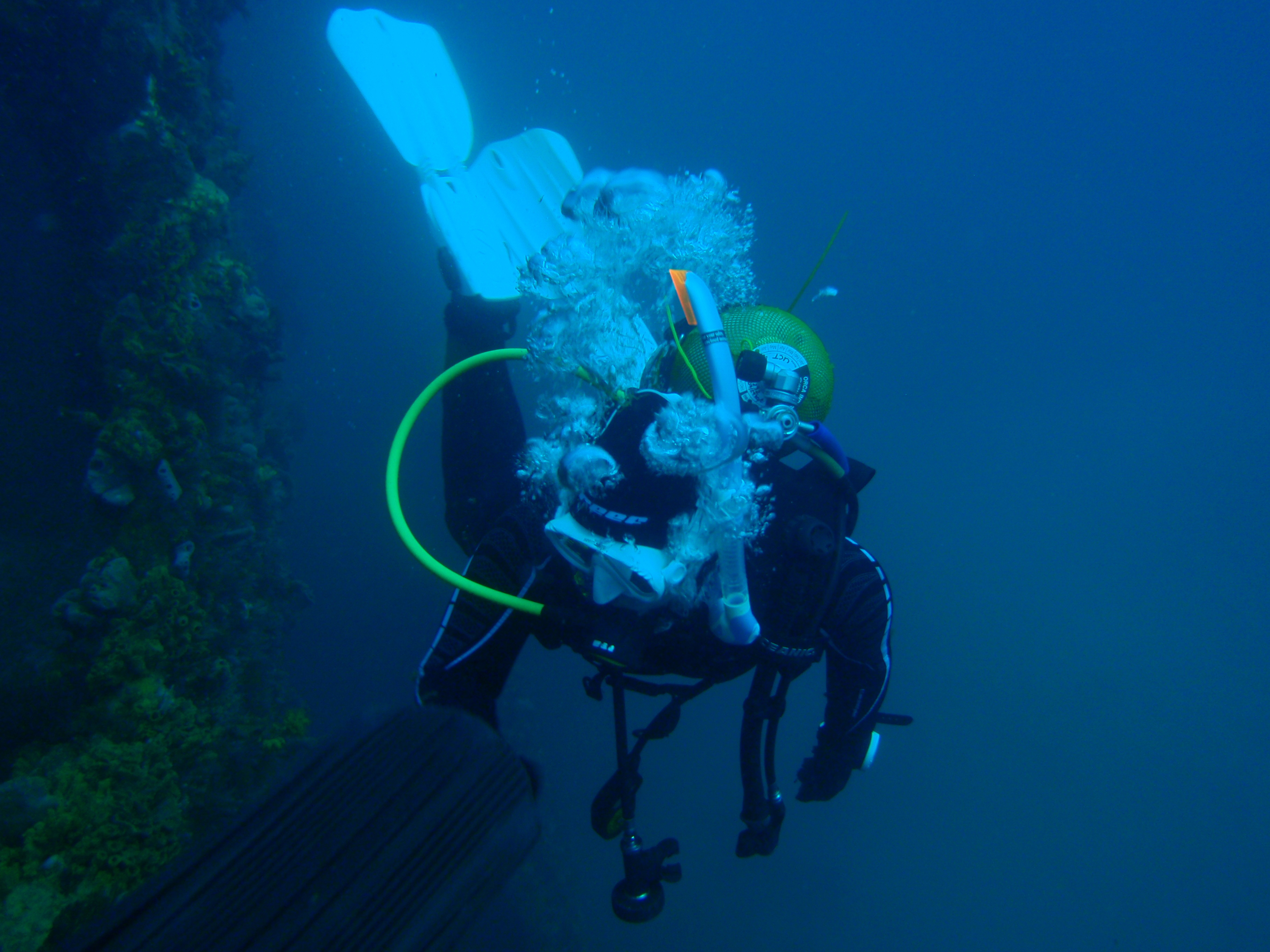
- Diving with a recreational open-circuit scuba set
- Acronym: Scuba
- Other names: Scuba gear; Open-circuit scuba; Diving rebreather; Aqualung; Bailout set
- Uses: Providing an underwater diver with an autonomous breathing gas supply

A scuba set, originally just scuba, is any breathing apparatus that is entirely carried by an underwater diver and provides the diver with breathing gas at the ambient pressure. Scuba is an anacronym for self-contained underwater breathing apparatus. Although strictly speaking the scuba set is only the diving equipment that is required for providing breathing gas to the diver, general usage includes the harness or rigging by which it is carried and those accessories which are integral parts of the harness and breathing apparatus assembly, such as a jacket or wing style buoyancy compensator and instruments mounted in a combined housing with the pressure gauge. In the looser sense, scuba set has been used to refer to all the diving equipment used by the scuba diver, though this would more commonly and accurately be termed scuba equipment or scuba gear. Scuba is overwhelmingly the most common underwater breathing system used by recreational divers and is also used in professional diving when it provides advantages, usually of mobility and range, over surface-supplied diving systems and is allowed by the relevant legislation and code of practice.

Two basic functional variations of scuba are in general use: open-circuit-demand, and rebreather. In open-circuit demand scuba, the diver expels exhaled breathing gas to the environment, and each breath is delivered at ambient pressure, on demand, by a diving regulator which reduces the pressure from the storage cylinder. The breathing gas is supplied through a demand valve; when the diver inhales, they reduce the pressure in the demand valve housing, thus drawing in fresh gas. In rebreather scuba, the system recycles the exhaled gas, removes carbon dioxide, and compensates for the used oxygen before the diver is supplied with gas from the breathing circuit. The amount of gas lost from the circuit during each breathing cycle depends on the design of the rebreather and depth change during the breathing cycle. Gas in the breathing circuit is at ambient pressure, and stored gas is provided through regulators or injectors, depending on the design.

Within these systems, various mounting configurations may be used to carry the scuba set, depending on application and preference. These include: back mount, which is generally used for recreational scuba and for bailout sets for surface supplied diving; side-mount, which is popular for tight cave penetrations; sling mount, used for stage-drop sets; decompression gas and bailout sets where the main gas supply is back-mounted; and various non-standard carry systems for special circumstances.

The most immediate risk associated with scuba diving is drowning due to a failure of the breathing gas supply. This may be managed by diligent monitoring of remaining gas, adequate planning and provision of an emergency gas supply carried by the diver in a bailout cylinder or supplied by the diver's buddy, and the skills required to manage the gas sources during the emergency.

== Etymology ==
The word SCUBA was coined in 1952 by Major Christian Lambertsen who served in the U.S. Army Medical Corps from 1944 to 1946 as a physician. Lambertsen first called the closed-circuit rebreather apparatus he had invented "Laru", an (acronym for Lambertsen Amphibious Respiratory Unit) but, in 1952, rejected the term "Laru" for "SCUBA" ("Self-Contained Underwater Breathing Apparatus"). Lambertsen's invention, for which he held several patents registered from 1940 to 1989, was a rebreather and is different from the open-circuit diving regulator and diving cylinder assemblies also commonly referred to as scuba.

Open-circuit-demand scuba is a 1943 invention by the Frenchmen Émile Gagnan and Jacques-Yves Cousteau, but in the English language Lambertsen's acronym has become common usage and the name Aqua-Lung (often spelled "aqualung"), coined by Cousteau for use in English-speaking countries, has fallen into secondary use. As with radar, the acronym scuba has become so familiar that it is generally not capitalized and is treated as an ordinary noun.

Although the term was originally an acronym, "scuba" is currently used to refer to the apparatus or the practice of diving using the apparatus, either alone as a common noun, or as an adjective in scuba set and scuba diving respectively. It is also used as an adjective referring to equipment or activity relating to diving using self-contained breathing apparatus.

== Application ==
A diver uses a self-contained underwater breathing apparatus (scuba) to breathe underwater. Scuba provides the diver with the advantages of mobility and horizontal range far beyond the reach of an umbilical hose attached to surface-supplied diving equipment (SSDE).

Unlike other modes of diving, which rely either on breath-hold or on breathing gas supplied under pressure from the surface, scuba divers carry their own source of breathing gas, usually filtered compressed air, allowing them greater freedom of movement than with an air line or diver's umbilical and longer underwater endurance than breath-hold. Scuba diving may be done recreationally or professionally in a number of applications, including scientific, military and public safety roles, but most commercial diving uses surface-supplied diving equipment for the main gas supply when this is practicable. Surface supplied divers may be required to carry scuba as an emergency breathing gas supply to get them to safety in the event of a failure of surface gas supply.

There are divers who work, full or part-time, in the recreational diving community as instructors, assistant instructors, divemasters and dive guides. In some jurisdictions the professional nature, with particular reference to responsibility for health and safety of the clients, of recreational diver instruction, dive leadership for reward and dive guiding is recognised and regulated by national legislation.

Other specialist areas of scuba diving include military diving, with a long history of military frogmen in various roles. Their roles include direct combat, infiltration behind enemy lines, placing mines or using a manned torpedo, bomb disposal or engineering operations. In civilian operations, many police forces operate police diving teams to perform "search and recovery" or "search and rescue" operations and to assist with the detection of crime which may involve bodies of water. In some cases search and rescue diving teams may also be part of a fire department, paramedical service or lifeguard unit, and may be classed as public safety diving.

There are also professional divers involved with the underwater environment, such as underwater photographers or underwater videographers, who document the underwater world, or scientific diving, including marine biology, geology, hydrology, oceanography and underwater archaeology.

The choice between scuba and surface supplied diving equipment is based on both legal and logistical constraints. Where the diver requires mobility and a large range of movement, scuba is usually the choice if safety and legal constraints allow. Higher risk work, particularly in commercial diving, may be restricted to surface supplied equipment by legislation and codes of practice.

=== Alternatives to scuba for diving ===
There are alternative methods that a person can use to survive and function while underwater, currently including:

- free-diving – swimming underwater on a single breath of air.
- snorkeling – a form of free-diving where the diver's mouth and nose can remain underwater when breathing, because the diver is able to breathe at the surface through a short tube known as a snorkel.
- surface-supplied diving – originally, and still used in professional diving for long or deep dives, where an umbilical cable provides breathing gas, voice communication and sometimes warm water to heat the diving suit from the surface. Some tourist resorts offer a surface-supplied air line diving system, trademarked as Snuba, as an introduction to diving for the inexperienced. Using the same type of demand valve as scuba diving, the diver breathes from a compressed air cylinder carried on a free-floating raft at the surface, through a simple hose limiting the diver to a depth of 20–30 feet (6–9 m).
- atmospheric diving suit – a rigid articulated pressure resistant suit that isolates the diver from the surrounding water pressure.

=== Operation ===
Breathing from scuba is mostly a straightforward matter. Under most circumstances it differs very little from normal surface breathing. In the case of a full-face mask, the diver may usually breathe through the nose or mouth as preferred, and in the case of a mouth held demand valve, the diver will have to hold the mouthpiece between the teeth and maintain a seal around it with the lips. Over a long dive this can induce jaw fatigue, and for some people, a gag reflex. Various styles of mouthpiece are available off the shelf or as customised items, and one of them may work better if either of these problems occur.

The frequently quoted warning against holding one's breath on scuba is a gross oversimplification of the actual hazard. The purpose of the admonition is to ensure that inexperienced divers do not accidentally hold their breath while surfacing, as the expansion of gas in the lungs could over-expand the lung air spaces and rupture the alveoli and their capillaries, allowing lung gases to get into the pulmonary return circulation, the pleura, or the interstitial areas near the injury, where it could cause dangerous medical conditions. Holding the breath at constant depth for short periods with a normal lung volume is generally harmless, providing there is sufficient ventilation on average to prevent carbon dioxide buildup, and is done as a standard practice by underwater photographers to avoid startling their subjects. Holding the breath during descent can eventually cause lung squeeze, and may allow the diver to miss warning signs of a gas supply malfunction until it is too late to remedy.

Skilled open circuit divers can and will make small adjustments to buoyancy by adjusting their average lung volume during the breathing cycle. This adjustment is generally in the order of a kilogram (corresponding to a litre of gas), and can be maintained for a moderate period, but it is more comfortable to adjust the volume of the buoyancy compensator over the longer term.

The practice of shallow breathing or skip breathing in an attempt to conserve breathing gas should be avoided as it tends to cause a carbon dioxide buildup, which can result in headaches and a reduced capacity to recover from a breathing gas supply emergency. The breathing apparatus will generally increase dead space by a small but significant amount, and cracking pressure and flow resistance in the demand valve will cause a net work of breathing increase, which will reduce the diver's capacity for other work. Work of breathing and the effect of dead space can be minimised by breathing relatively deeply and slowly. These effects increase with depth, as density and friction increase in proportion to the increase in pressure, with the limiting case where all the diver's available energy may be expended on simply breathing, with none left for other purposes. This would be followed by a buildup in carbon dioxide, causing an urgent feeling of a need to breathe, and if this cycle is not broken, panic and drowning are likely to follow. The use of a low density inert gas, typically helium, in the breathing mixture can reduce this problem, as well as diluting the narcotic effects of the other gases.

Breathing from a rebreather is much the same, except that the work of breathing is affected mainly by flow resistance in the breathing loop. This is partly due to the carbon dioxide absorbent in the scrubber, and is related to the distance the gas passes through the absorbent material, and the size of the gaps between the grains, as well as the gas composition and ambient pressure. Water in the loop can greatly increase the resistance to gas flow through the scrubber. There is even less point in shallow or skip breathing on a rebreather as this does not even conserve gas, and the effect on buoyancy is negligible when the sum of loop volume and lung volume remains constant.

=== Breathing gases for scuba ===
Until Nitrox, which contains more oxygen than air, was widely accepted in the late 1990s, almost all recreational scuba used simple compressed and filtered air. Other gas mixtures, typically used for deeper dives by technical divers, may substitute helium for some or all of the nitrogen (called Trimix, or Heliox if there is no nitrogen), or use lower proportions of oxygen than air. In these situations divers often carry additional scuba sets, called stages, with gas mixtures with higher levels of oxygen that are primarily used to reduce decompression time in staged decompression diving. These gas mixes allow longer dives, better management of the risks of decompression sickness, oxygen toxicity or lack of oxygen (hypoxia), and the severity of nitrogen narcosis. Closed circuit scuba sets (rebreathers) provide a gas mix that is controlled to optimise the mix for the actual depth at the time.

== Types ==
Scuba sets are of two types:

- In open-circuit scuba the diver inhales from the equipment and all the exhaled gas is exhausted to the surrounding water. This type of equipment is relatively simple, economical and reliable.
- In closed-circuit or semi-closed circuit, also referred to as a rebreather, the diver inhales from the set, and exhales back into the set, where the exhaled gas is processed to make it fit to breathe again. This equipment is efficient and quiet.

Both types of scuba set include a means of supplying air or other breathing gas, nearly always from a high pressure diving cylinder, and a harness to attach it to the diver. Most open-circuit scuba sets have a demand regulator to control the supply of breathing gas, and most rebreathers have a constant-flow injector, or an electronically controlled injector to supply fresh gas, but also usually have an automatic diluent valve (ADV), which functions in the same way as a demand valve, to maintain the loop volume during descent.

=== Open-circuit ===
Open-circuit-demand scuba exhausts exhaled air to the environment, and requires each breath to be delivered to the diver on demand by a diving regulator, which reduces the pressure from the storage cylinder and supplies it through the demand valve when the diver reduces the pressure in the demand valve slightly during inhalation.

The essential subsystems of an open-circuit scuba set are;

- diving cylinders, with cylinder valves, which may be interconnected by a manifold,
- a regulator mechanism to control gas pressure,
- a demand valve with mouthpiece, full-face mask or helmet, with supply hose, to control flow and deliver gas to the diver.
- an exhaust valve system to dispose of used gas,
- A harness or other method to attach the set to the diver.

Additional components which when present are considered part of the scuba set are;

- external reserve valves and their control rods or levers, (currently uncommon)
- submersible pressure gauges, (almost ubiquitous) and
- secondary (backup) demand valves (common).

The buoyancy compensator is generally assembled as an integrated part of the set, but is not technically part of the breathing apparatus.

The cylinder is usually worn on the back. "Twin sets" with two low capacity back-mounted cylinders connected by a high pressure manifold were more common in the 1960s than now for recreational diving, although larger capacity twin cylinders ("doubles") are commonly used by technical divers for increased dive duration and redundancy. At one time a firm called Submarine Products sold a sport air scuba set with three manifolded back-mounted cylinders. Cave and wreck penetration divers sometimes carry cylinders attached at their sides instead, allowing them to swim through more confined spaces.

==== Constant flow scuba ====
Constant flow scuba sets do not have a demand regulator; the breathing gas flows at a constant rate, unless the diver switches it on and off by hand. They use more air than demand regulated scuba. There were attempts at designing and using these for diving and for industrial use before the Cousteau-type aqualung became commonly available circa 1950. Examples were Charles Condert's dress in the US (as of 1831), and Yves le Prieur's hand-controlled supply valve in France (as of 1926); see Timeline of diving technology. These systems are obsolete as they waste most of the gas or require manual control of each breath, and more efficient demand regulators are available. "Ohgushi's Peerless Respirator" from Japan as of 1918 had a bite-controlled breathing gas supply valve, which could be considered a form of demand valve, and was successfully used for several years.

==== Open-circuit demand scuba ====
This system consists of one or more diving cylinders containing breathing gas at high pressure, typically 200–300 bars (2,900–4,400 psi), connected to a diving regulator. The demand regulator automatically supplies the diver with as much gas as is needed at the ambient pressure.

This type of breathing set is sometimes called an aqualung. The word Aqua-Lung, which first appeared in the Cousteau-Gagnan patent, is a trademark, currently owned by Aqua Lung/La Spirotechnique.

===== Twin-hose demand regulator =====
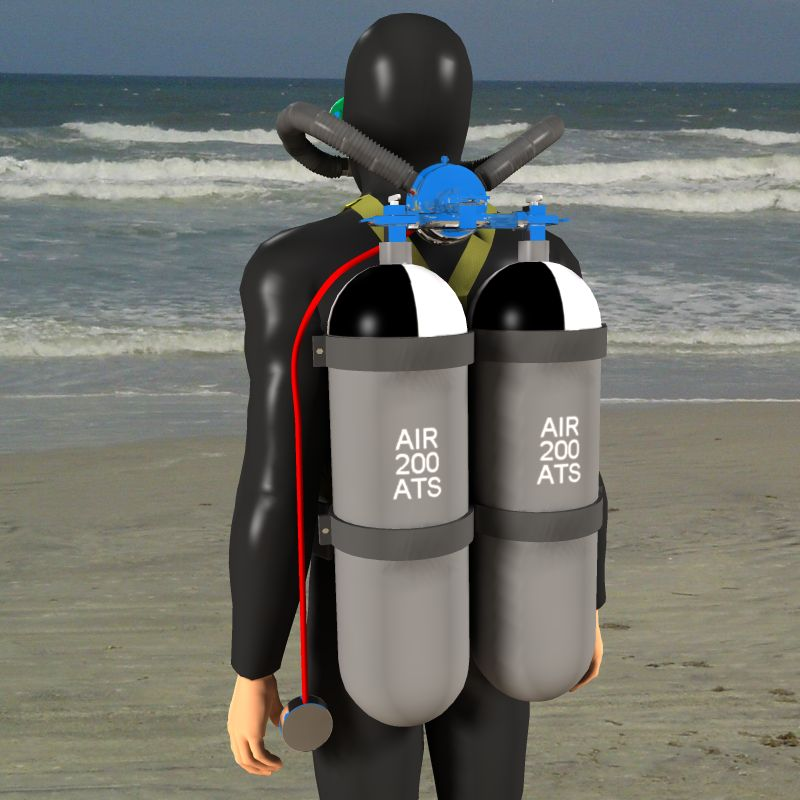
Classic twin-hose Cousteau-type aqualung

This is the first type of diving demand valve to come into general use, and the one that can be seen in classic 1960s television scuba adventures, such as Sea Hunt. They were often use with manifolded twin cylinders.

All the stages of this type of regulator are in a large valve assembly mounted directly to the cylinder valve or manifold, behind the diver's neck. Two large bore corrugated rubber breathing hoses connect the regulator with the mouthpiece, one for supply and one for exhaust. The exhaust hose is used to return the exhaled air to the regulator, to avoid pressure differences due to depth variation between the exhaust valve and final stage diaphragm, which would cause a free-flow of gas, or extra resistance to breathing, depending on the diver's orientation in the water. In modern single-hose sets this problem is avoided by moving the second-stage regulator to the diver's mouthpiece. The twin-hose regulators came with a mouthpiece as standard, but a full-face diving mask was an option.

===== Single-hose regulator =====
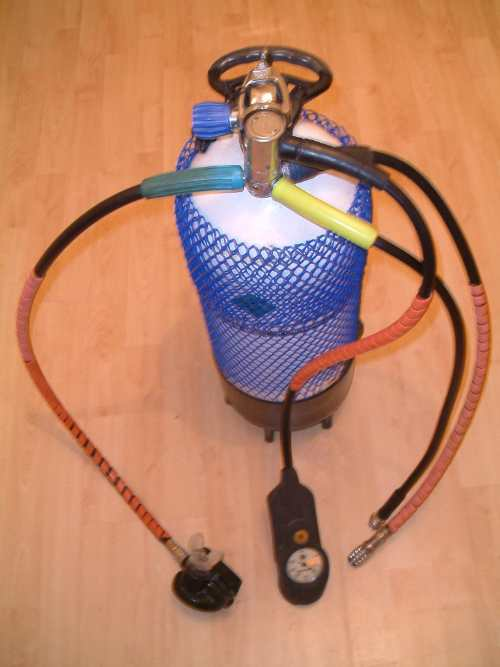
A single-hose regulator with 2nd stage, gauges, BC attachment, and dry suit hose mounted on a cylinder

Most modern open-circuit scuba sets have a diving regulator consisting of a first-stage pressure-reducing valve connected to the diving cylinder's output valve or manifold. This regulator reduces the pressure from the cylinder, which may be up to 300 bars (4,400 psi), to a lower pressure, generally between about 9 and 11 bar above the ambient pressure. A low-pressure hose links this with the second-stage regulator, or "demand valve", which is mounted on the mouthpiece. Exhalation occurs through a rubber one-way mushroom valve in the chamber of the demand valve, directly into the water quite close to the diver's mouth. Some early single hose scuba sets used full-face masks instead of a mouthpiece, such as those made by Desco and Scott Aviation (who continue to make breathing units of this configuration for use by firefighters).

Modern regulators typically feature high-pressure ports for pressure sensors of dive-computers and submersible pressure gauges, and additional low-pressure ports for hoses for inflation of dry suits and BC devices.

===== Primary demand valve =====
The primary demand valve is the one the diver usually breathes from. There may be a secondary demand valve on the same regulator, or on a different first stage connected to the same scuba set. Additional scuba sets used for bailout, stages, decompression, or sidemount diving usually only have one second stage, which for that set is the primary by default.

===== Secondary demand valve =====
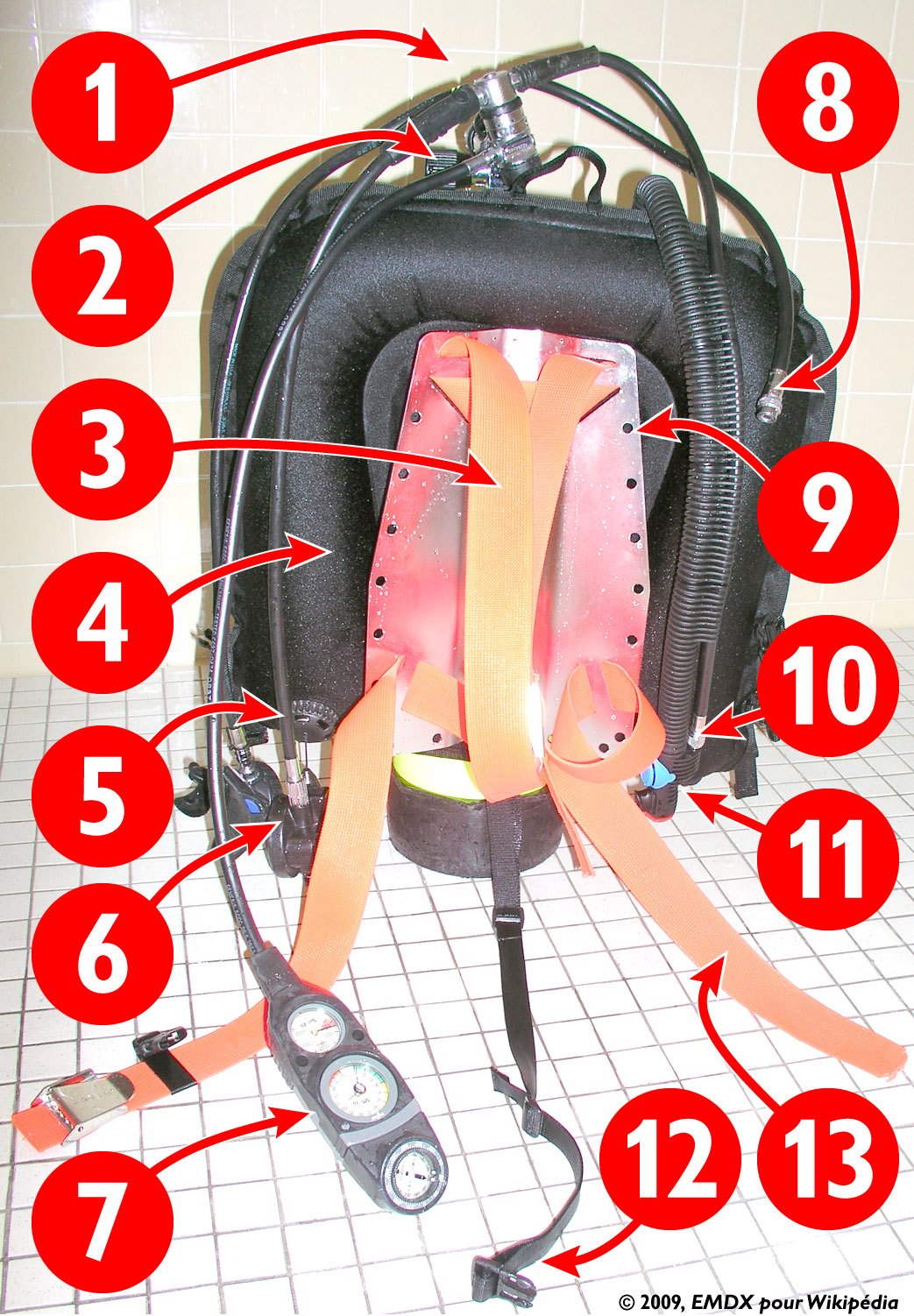
Scuba harness with backplate and back mounted "wing" buoyancy compensator: 1. Regulator first stage; 2. Cylinder valve; 3. Shoulder straps; 4. Buoyancy compensator bladder; 5. Buoyancy compensator relief and lower manual dump valve; 6. DV/Regulator second stages (primary and “octopus”); 7. Console (submersible pressure gauge, depth gauge & compass); 8. Dry-suit inflator hose; 9. Backplate; 10. Buoyancy compensator inflator hose and inflation valve; 11. Buoyancy compensator mouthpiece and manual dump valve; 12. Crotch strap; 13. Waist strap

Most recreational scuba sets have a backup second-stage demand valve on a separate hose, a configuration called a "secondary", or "octopus" demand valve, "alternate air source", "safe secondary" or "safe-second". This arrangement was intended to reduce the problems of buddy breathing from a single demand valve and has become the standard in recreational diving. By providing a second demand valve the need to alternately breathe off the same mouthpiece when sharing air is eliminated. This reduces the stress on divers who are already in a stressful situation, and this in turn reduces air consumption during the rescue and frees the donor's hand.

Some diver training agencies recommend that a diver routinely offer their primary demand valve to a diver requesting to share air, and then switch to their own secondary demand valve. The idea behind this technique is that the primary demand valve is known to be working, and the diver donating the gas is less likely to be stressed or have a high carbon dioxide level, so has more time to sort out their own equipment after temporarily suspending the ability to breathe. In many instances, panicked divers have grabbed the primary regulators out of the mouths of other divers, so changing to the backup as a routine reduces stress when it is necessary in an emergency.

In technical diving donation of the primary demand valve is commonly the standard procedure, and the primary is connected to the first stage by a long hose, typically around 2 m, to allow gas sharing while swimming in single file in a narrow space as might be required in a cave or wreck. In this configuration the secondary is generally held under the chin by a loose bungee loop around the neck, supplied by a shorter hose, and is intended for backup use by the diver donating gas. The backup regulator is usually carried in the diver's chest area where it can be easily seen and accessed for emergency use. It may be worn secured by a breakaway clip on the buoyancy compensator, plugged into a soft friction socket attached to the harness, secured by sliding a loop of the hose into the shoulder strap cover of a jacket style BC, or suspended under the chin on a break-away bungee loop known as a necklace. These methods also keep the secondary from dangling below the diver and being contaminated by debris or snagging on the surroundings. Some divers store it in a BC pocket, but this reduces availability in an emergency.

Occasionally, the secondary second-stage is combined with the inflation and exhaust valve assembly of the buoyancy compensator device. This combination eliminates the need for a separate low pressure hose for the BC, though the low pressure hose connector for combined use must have a larger bore than for standard BC inflation hoses, because it will need to deliver a higher flow rate if it is used for breathing. This combination unit is carried in the position where the inflator unit would normally hang on the left side of the chest. With integrated DV/BC inflator designs, the secondary demand valve is at the end of the shorter BC inflation hose, and the donor must retain access to it for buoyancy control, so donation of the primary regulator to help another diver is essential with this configuration. The secondary demand valve is often partially yellow in color, and may use a yellow hose, for high visibility, and as an indication that it is an emergency or backup device.

When a side-mount configuration is used, the usefulness of a secondary demand valve is greatly reduced, as each cylinder will have a regulator and the one not in use is available as a backup. This configuration also allows the entire cylinder to be handed off to the receiver, so a long hose is also less likely to be needed.

Some diving instructors continue to teach buddy-breathing from a single demand valve as an obsolescent but still occasionally useful technique, learned in addition to the use of the backup DV, since availability of two second stages per diver is now assumed as standard in recreational scuba.

==== Cryogenic ====
There have been designs for a cryogenic open-circuit scuba which has liquid-air tanks instead of cylinders. Underwater cinematographer Jordan Klein Sr. of Florida co-designed such a scuba in 1967, called "Mako", and made at least five prototypes.

The Russian Kriolang (from Greek cryo- (= "frost" taken to mean "cold") + English "lung") was copied from Jordan Klein's "Mako" cryogenic open-circuit scuba. and were made until at least 1974. It would have to be filled a short time before use.

=== Rebreathers ===
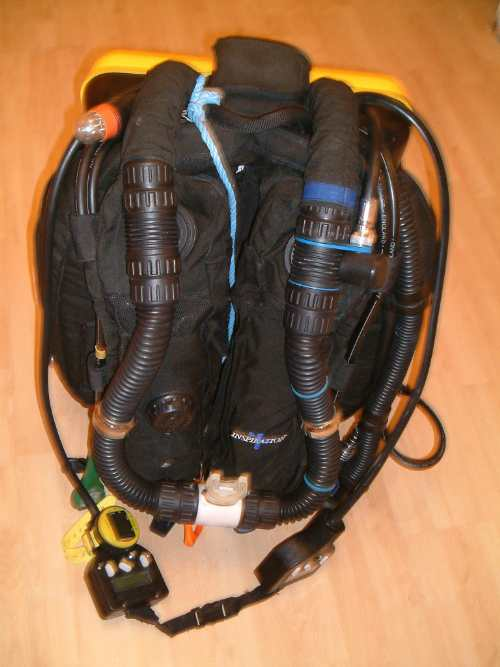
An Inspiration rebreather seen from the front

A rebreather recirculates the breathing gas already used by the diver after replacing oxygen used by the diver and removing the carbon dioxide metabolic product. Rebreather diving is used by recreational, military and scientific divers where it can have advantages over open-circuit scuba. Since 80% or more of the oxygen remains in normal exhaled gas, and is thus wasted, rebreathers use gas very economically, making longer dives possible and special mixes cheaper to use at the cost of more complicated technology and more possible failure points. More stringent and specific training and greater experience is required to compensate for the higher risk involved. The rebreather's economic use of gas, typically 1.6 litres (0.06 cu ft) of oxygen per minute, allows dives of much longer duration for an equivalent gas supply than is possible with open-circuit equipment where gas consumption may be ten times higher.

There are two main variants of rebreather – semi-closed circuit rebreathers, and fully closed circuit rebreathers, which include the subvariant of oxygen rebreathers. Oxygen rebreathers have a maximum safe operating depth of around 6 metres (20 ft), but several types of fully closed circuit rebreathers, when using a helium-based diluent, can be used deeper than 100 metres (330 ft). The main limiting factors on rebreathers are the duration of the carbon dioxide scrubber, which is generally at least 3 hours, increased work of breathing at depth, reliability of gas mixture control, and the requirement to be able to safely bail out at any point of the dive.

Rebreathers are generally used for scuba applications, but are also occasionally used for bailout systems or gas extenders for surface supplied diving.

The possible endurance of a rebreather dive is longer than an open-circuit dive, for similar weight and bulk of the set, if the set is bigger than the practical lower limit for rebreather size, and a rebreather can be more economical when used with expensive gas mixes such as heliox and trimix, but this may require a lot of diving before the break-even point is reached, due to the high initial and running costs of most rebreathers, and this point will be reached sooner for deep dives where the gas saving is more pronounced.

== Diving cylinders ==
Gas cylinders used for scuba diving come in various sizes and materials and are typically designated by material – usually aluminium or steel, and size. In the U.S. the size is designated by their nominal capacity, the volume of the gas they contain when expanded to normal atmospheric pressure. Common sizes include 80, 100, 120 cubic feet, etc., with the most common being the "Aluminum 80". In most of the rest of the world the size is given as the actual internal volume of the cylinder, sometimes referred to as water capacity, as that is how it is measured and marked (WC) on the cylinder (10 liter, 12 liter, etc.).

Cylinder working pressure will vary according to the standard of manufacture, generally ranging from 200 bar (2,900 psi) up to 300 bar (4,400 psi).

An aluminium cylinder is thicker and bulkier than a steel cylinder of the same capacity and working pressure, as suitable aluminium alloys have lower tensile strength than steel, and is more buoyant although actually heavier out of the water, which means the diver would need to carry more ballast weight. Steel is also more often used for high pressure cylinders, which carry more air for the same internal volume.

The common method of blending nitrox by partial pressure requires that the cylinder is in "oxygen service", which means that the cylinder and cylinder valve have had any non-oxygen-compatible components replaced and any contamination by combustible materials removed by cleaning. Diving cylinders are sometimes colloquially called "tanks" "scuba tanks", "bottles" or "flasks", and some of these may be equivalent to the correct term in other languages although the proper technical term for them is "cylinder" or "scuba cylinder".

Rebreather divers and some open-circuit scuba divers carry extra diving cylinders for bailout in case the main breathing gas supply is used up or malfunctions. If the bailout cylinder is small, they may be called "pony cylinders". They have their own demand regulators and mouthpieces, and are technically distinct extra scuba sets. In technical diving, the diver may carry different equipment for different phases of the dive. Some breathing gas mixes, such as trimix, may only be used at depth, and others, such as pure oxygen, may only be used during decompression stops in shallow water. The heaviest cylinders are generally carried on the back supported by a backplate while others are side slung from strong points on the harness.

== Harness configuration ==
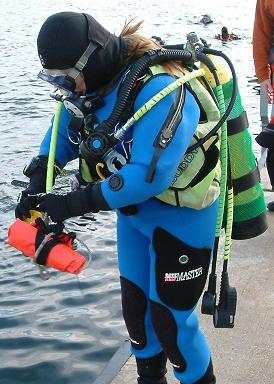
Stabilizer jacket harness

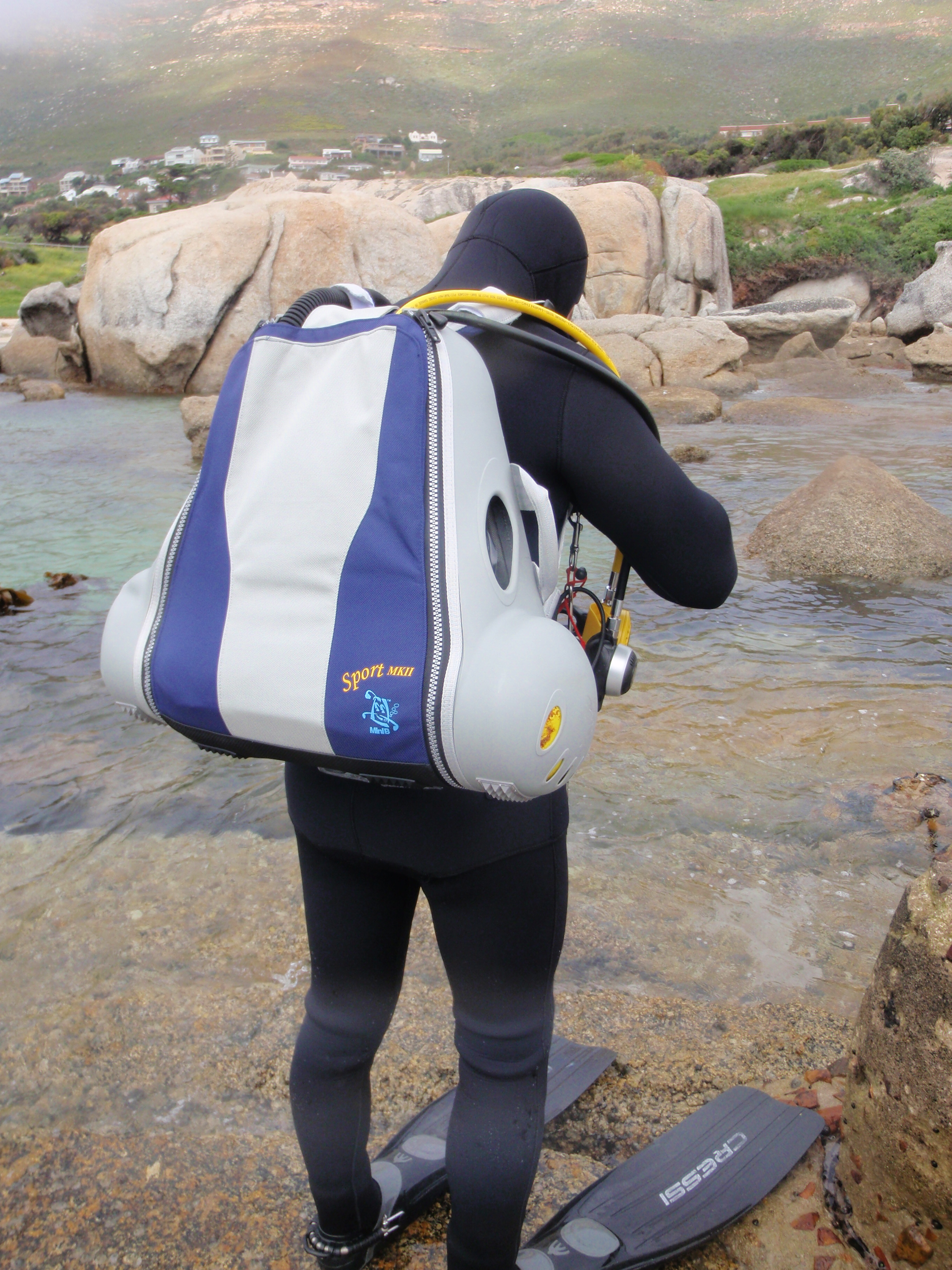
Scuba set with integral storage and transport bag

The scuba set can be carried by the diver in several ways. The two most common basic mounting configurations are back-mount and side-mount, and back-mount may be expanded to include auxiliary side-mounting, including bungee-constrained low profile side-mount, and the less compact sling-mount or stage-mount arrangement. A few diving rebreathers are chest mounted.

=== Back mount ===
Back mounted scuba is straightforward, popular and for a single cylinder well balanced and easy to learn to use. There are several variations on the configuration which have been developed to improve convenience, safety, or suitability for use with multiple cylinders.

==== Stabilizer jacket ====
The most common configuration for recreational diving is the stabilizer jacket harness, in which a single cylinder, or occasionally twins, is strapped to the jacket style buoyancy compensator which is used as the harness. Some jacket style harnesses allow a bailout or decompression cylinder to be sling mounted from D-rings on the harness. A small bailout cylinder (pony cylinder) can also be strapped to the side of the main back-mounted cylinder.

==== Backplate and wing ====
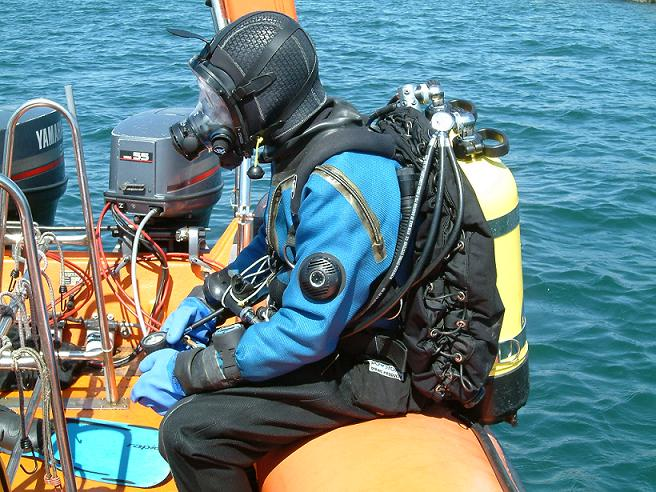
Backplate and wing harness

Another popular configuration is the backplate and wing arrangement, which uses a back inflation buoyancy compensator bladder sandwiched between a rigid backplate and the main gas cylinder or cylinders. This arrangement is particularly popular with twin or double cylinder sets, and can be used to carry larger sets of three or four cylinders and most rebreathers. Additional cylinders for decompression can be sling mounted at the diver's sides.

==== Plain backpack ====
It is also possible to use a plain backpack harness to support the set, either with a horse-collar buoyancy compensator, or without any buoyancy compensator. This was the standard arrangement before the introduction of the buoyancy compensator, and is still used by some recreational and professional divers when it suits the diving operation.

==== Bailout and safety harness ====
Surface-supplied divers are generally required to carry an emergency gas supply, also known as a bailout set, which is usually back-mounted open circuit scuba connected into the breathing gas supply system by connecting an interstage hose to the gas switching block, (or bailout block), mounted on the side of the helmet or full-face mask, or on the diver's harness where it can easily be reached, but is unlikely to be accidentally opened. Other mounting arrangements may be used for special circumstances.

==== Integrated harness and storage/transport container ====
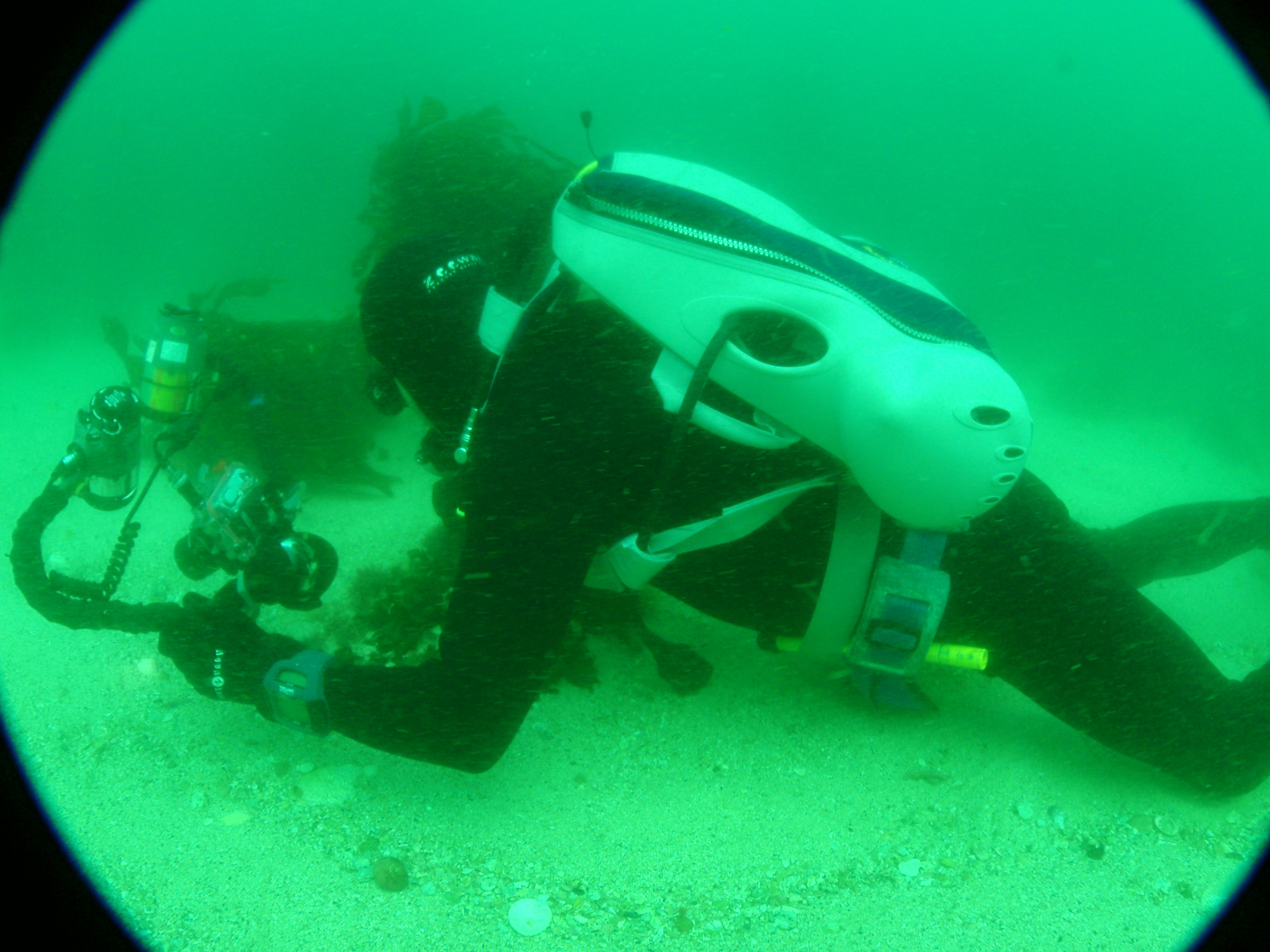
Diving with a scuba set with integral storage and transport bag. The Mini B scuba system is shown

The Mini B scuba system is an open circuit scuba set with an integral harness and soft transport/storage bag. These units consist of a rucksack with a one size fits all harness, inside which is an air cell for buoyancy control, a horizontally mounted cylinder, and a regulator with primary and octopus demand valves, and a console with submersible pressure gauge and depth gauge, which protrude from the top of the unit when in use. Some military rebreathers such as the Interspiro DCSC and the Russian IDA71 also store the breathing hoses inside the housing when not in use.

=== Stage mounting ===
Technical divers may need to carry several different gas mixtures, or several extra cylinders with additional gas needed for the dive. These are intended to be used for different stages of the planned dive profile, and for safety reasons it is necessary for the diver to be able to check which gas is in use at any given depth and time, and to open and close the supply valves when required, so the gases are generally carried in fully self-contained independent scuba sets, which are suspended from the harness at the diver's sides. This arrangement is known as stage mounting, or sling mounting, the scuba sets known as stage sets or stage cylinders, and usually applies to cylinders additional to the main back mounted set or sets.

==== Drop tanks ====
Stage sets may be cached along a penetration guideline to be retrieved during exit for convenience. These are also called drop tanks. A drop tank is usually rigged to be carried in a sling mount, and has a regulator with a pressure gauge fitted and is deposited at a suitable place along the guideline, usually clipped to the line to ensure that it can be found again. The amount of gas in a drop tank can vary depending on how it is intended to be used. The gas mix must be suitable for the stage in which it will be used, and will be marked on a label, usually with the user's name, to avoid confusion. The cylinder valve is closed until the time of use.

==== Stage-only mounting ====
Similar in basic concept to side mount and may be confused with it, but does not use bungees to control the top of the cylinder. No back mounted cylinder is carried, and all cylinders are slung at the sides like regular stage cylinders, so they do not tuck in under the arms for streamlining and low profile.

=== Sidemount ===
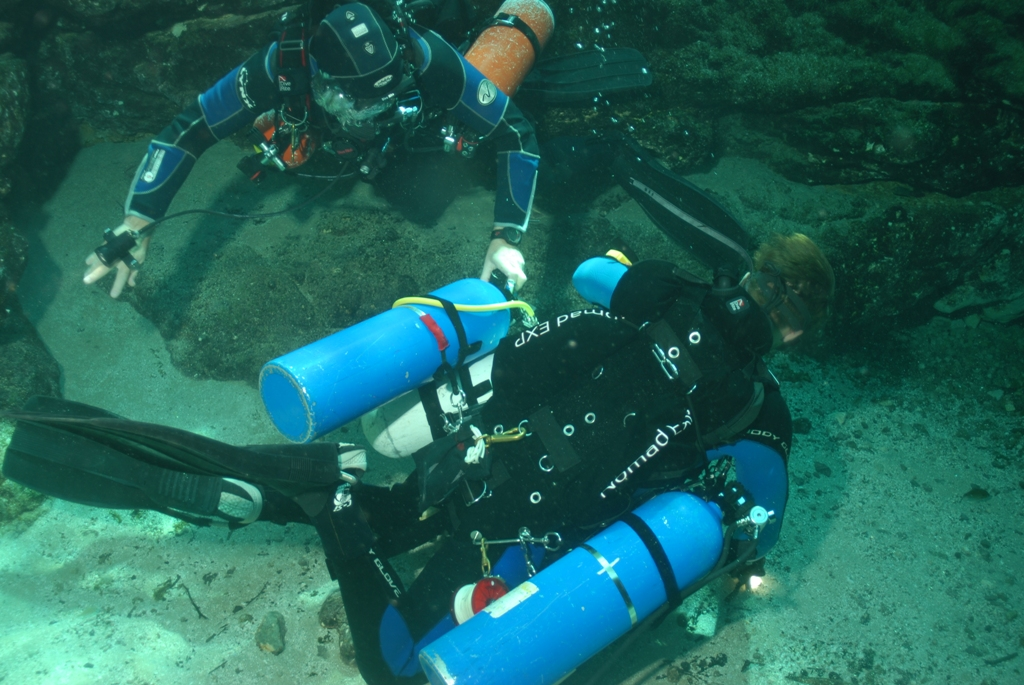
Top view of diver with sidemount harness

Side-mount harnesses support the cylinders by clipping them to D-rings or butt rails at the hip on either or both sides, and the cylinders hang roughly parallel to the diver's torso when underwater. The top of the cylinder is held under the diver's shoulder by a bungee, keeping it roughly parallel to the torso, and may also be clipped onto the harness in the shoulder area by a bolt snap for security. The harness usually includes a buoyancy compensator bladder. It is possible for a skilled diver to carry up to 3 cylinders on each side with this system.

==== Monkey diving ====
Recreational diving configuration with only a single side-mounted cylinder.

=== No-mount diving ===
For some cave diving applications where there is little or no swimming involved and tight restrictions, the diver may carry one or more cylinders simply clipped to the harness or weightbelt, which can be unclipped when necessary to pass through a restriction. This has been called no-mount diving.

== Harness construction ==
Every scuba harness requires a system for supporting the cylinders on the harness, and a system for attaching the harness to the diver.

=== Back mount ===
The most common system has the scuba set carried on the back of the diver. This uses well developed and familiar load carrying harness systems developed for terrestrial activities, and keeps the bulky and heavy components clear of the chest area. Back mounting also tends to restrict access to the control valves for the gas supply, and puts most of the set where the diver cannot see it.

==== Basic harness ====
The most basic arrangement for a back-mounted set consists of a metal or webbing strap around the cylinder just below the shoulder, and another lower down the cylinder, to which webbing shoulder and waist straps are attached. Shoulder straps can be of fixed length to suit a particular diver, but are more often adjustable. Sometimes a quick release buckle is added to one or both of the shoulder straps. The waist belt has a buckle for closing and release, and the waist belt is usually adjustable for security and comfort. Various attachments have been used to attach the harness straps to the cylinder bands. A crotch strap is optional, and usually runs from the lower cylinder band to the front of the waistband. This strap prevents the set from riding upwards on the diver when in use. This arrangement is still occasionally seen in use.

==== Backplate or backpack harness ====
The characteristic difference between this and the basic harness, is that a rigid or flexible backplate is added between the cylinder and the harness straps. The cylinder is attached to the backplate by metal or webbing straps, and the harness straps are attached to the backplate. In other respects the system is similar to the basic harness. Methods of fixing the cylinder include metal clamping bands, secured by bolts or lever operated clamps, or webbing straps, usually secured by cam buckles.

This style of harness was originally used in this simple form, but is currently more usually used with a back inflation wing type buoyancy compensator sandwiched between the cylinder and the backplate.

===== Cam bands =====
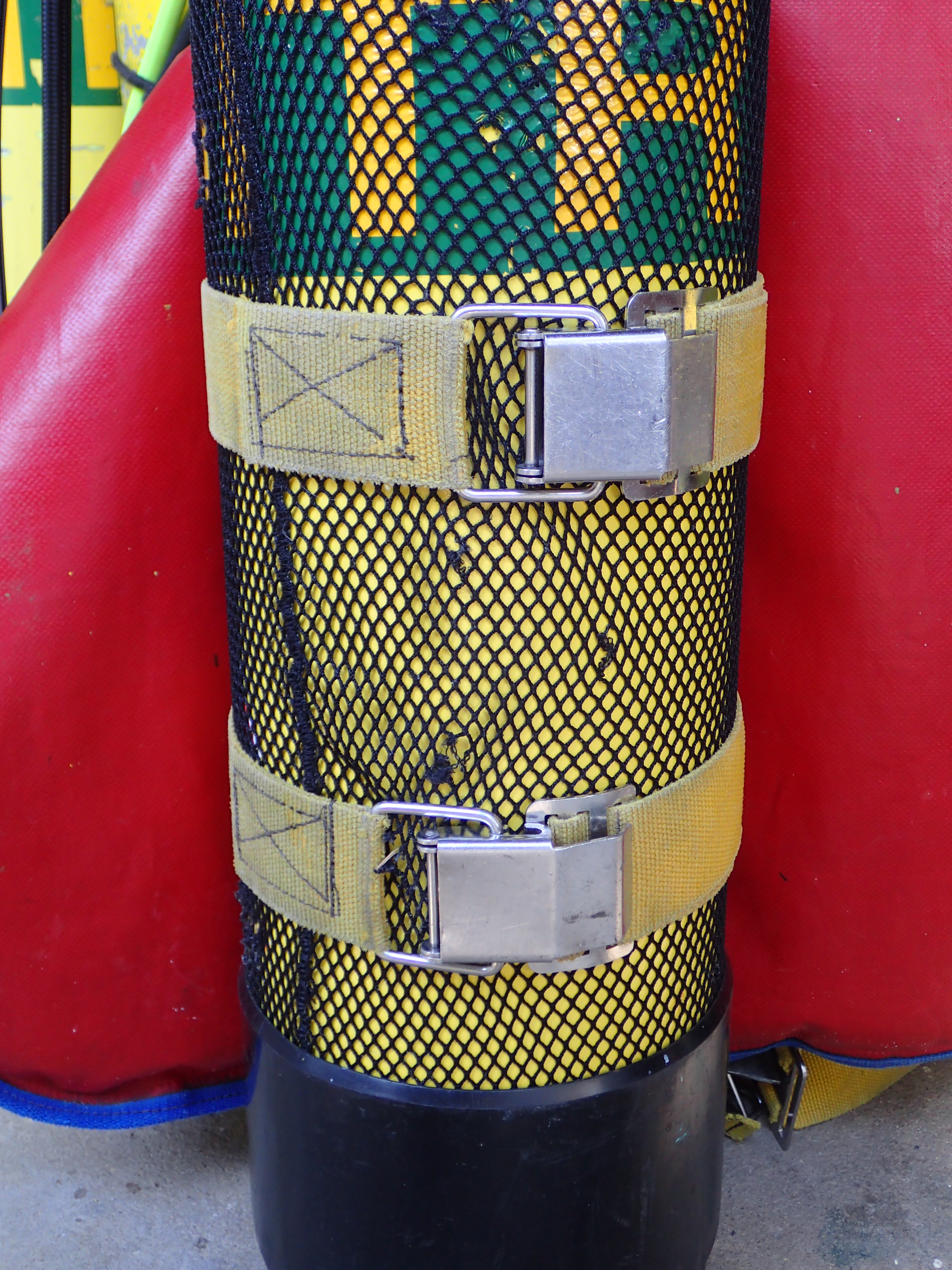
Two cam bands holding a cylinder to a backplate

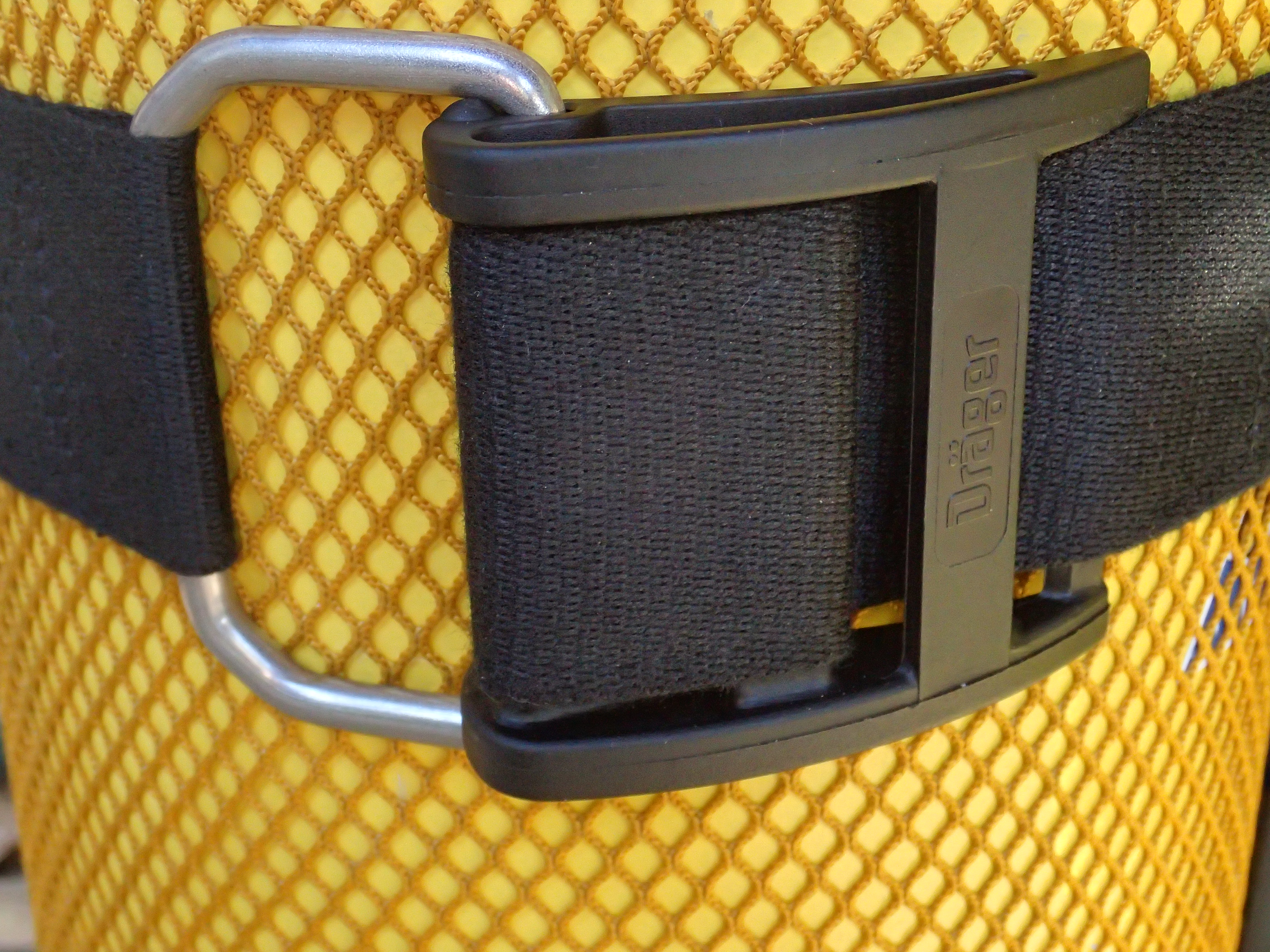
Plastic cam buckle tensioned

The combination of webbing strap and cam action buckle that is used to secure the cylinder to a buoyancy compensator or backplate is known as a cam band or cam strap. They are a type of tank band, which includes the stainless steel straps used to hold twin cylinder sets together. They generally rely on an over-centre lever action to provide tensioning and locking, which may be modified by length adjustment slots and secondary security fastening such as velcro to hold the free end in place. Most cam buckles for scuba are injection moulded plastic, but some are stainless steel. Many recreational scuba harnesses rely on a single cam band to hold the cylinder to the backplate. Other models provide two cam bands for security. A cam band can also be used on a sling or sidemount scuba set to attach the lower clip to the cylinder.

===== Tank bands =====
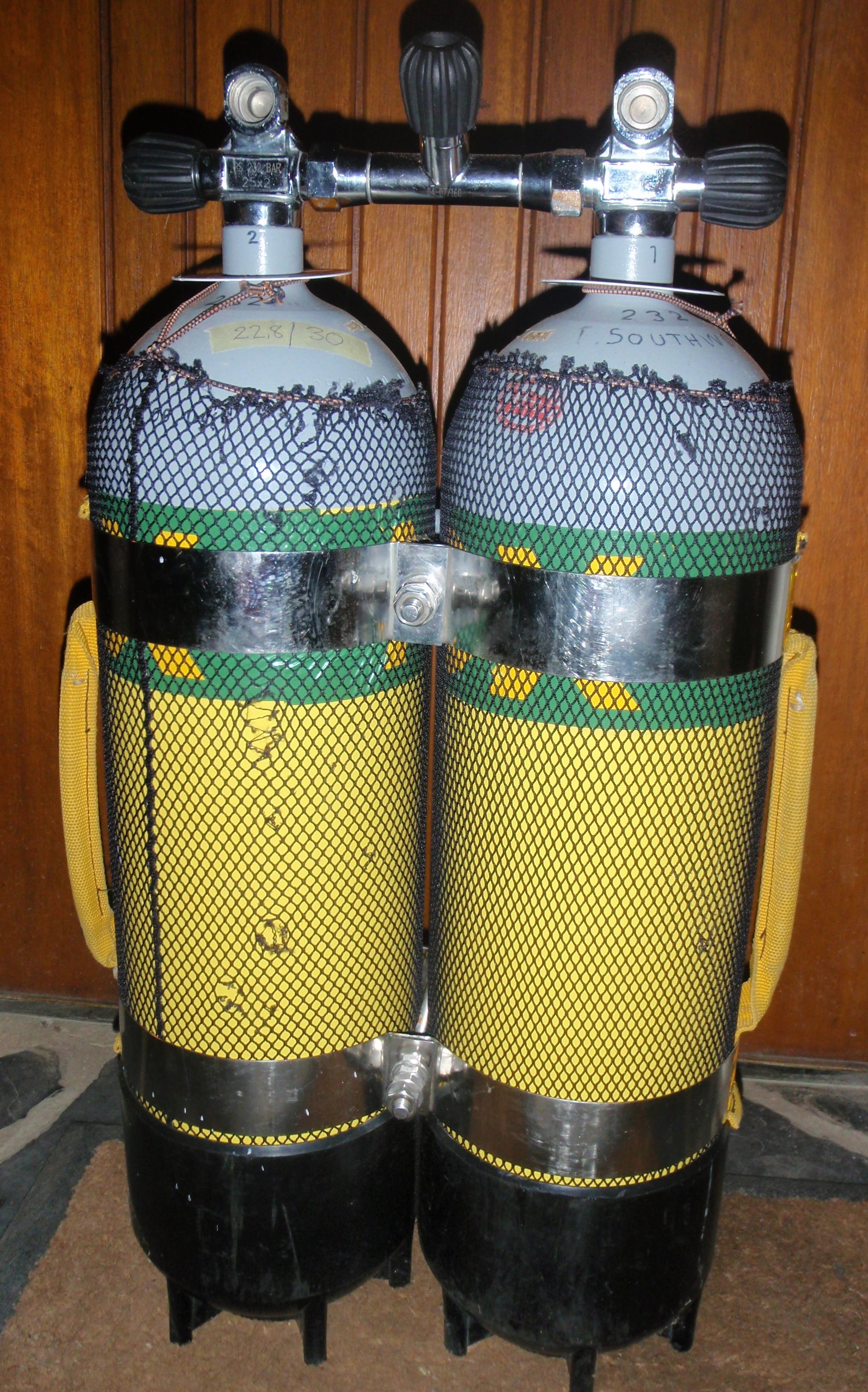
Manifolded twin 12 litre steel cylinder set assembled using two stainless steel tank bands.

Stainless steel tank bands are the standard method for supporting manifolded twin cylinders, as they provide good support for the cylinders, minimise loads on the manifolds and provide simple and reliable attachment points for connection to a backplate

=== Front mount ===
Almost exclusively used for military rebreathers and escape sets.

=== Integrated harness and storage bag ===
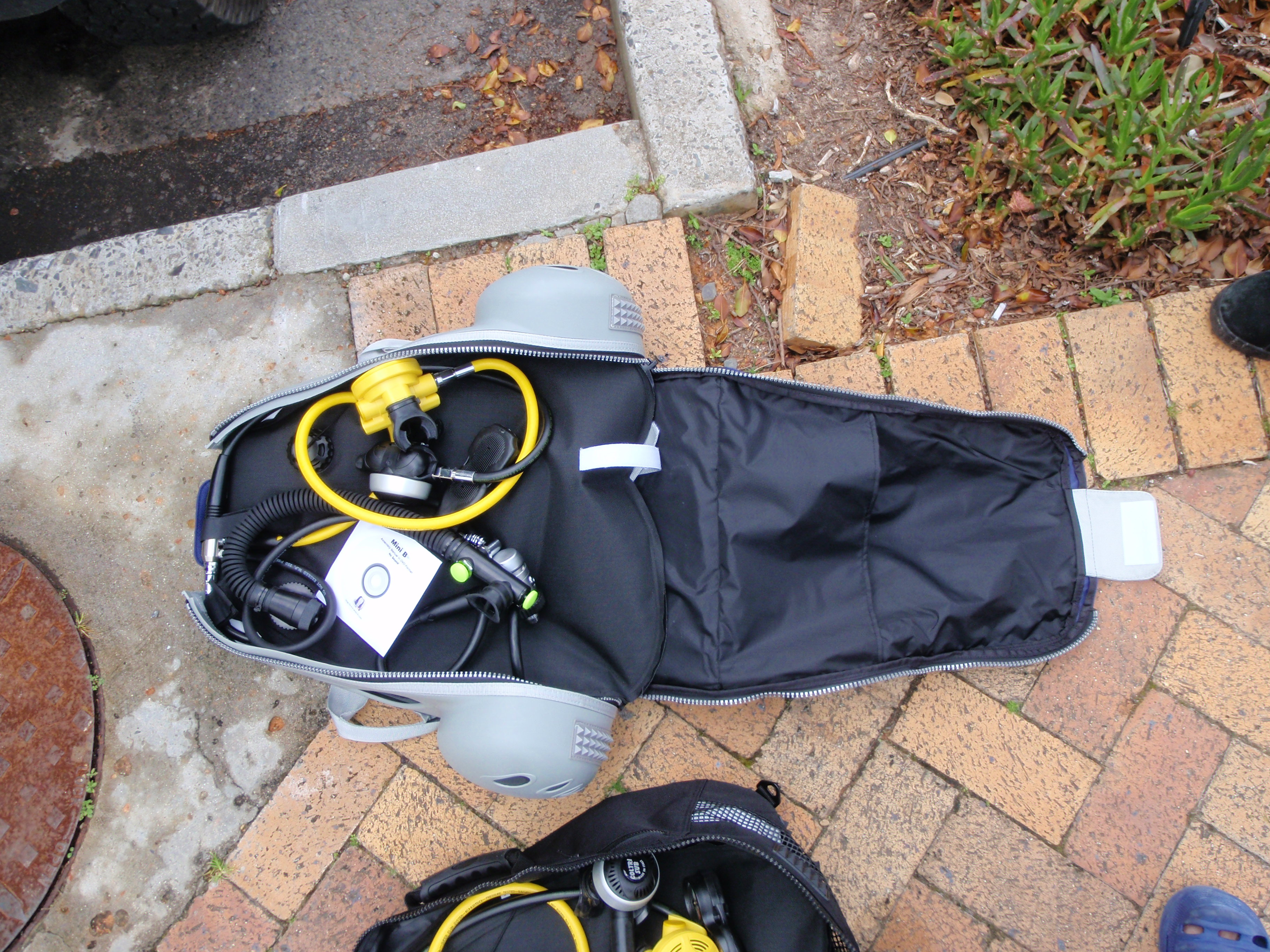
Scuba set in integral carry bag

A few examples of integrating a storage and carrying bag into the harness have been made, without notable success for open circuit scuba. The most successful examples have been for military rebreathers, where there has been space in a rigid housing to fit the breathing hoses, mask or DSV, and simple harness straps inside the casing when the counterlungs are empty.

=== Sidemount harness ===
The most basic sidemount harness is little more than cylinders fitted with belt loops and slid onto the standard caver's belay or battery belt along with any extra weights needed to achieve neutral buoyancy, and a caver's belt mounted battery pack. This simple configuration is particularly low profile and suited to small cylinders.

A more complex but still minimalist system is a webbing harness with shoulder straps, waist belt and crotch strap, supporting a variety of sliders and D-rings for attachment of cylinders and accessories, with or without integrated weighting or separate weight belts, and with or without a back mounted buoyancy compensator, which may be attached to the harness, or directly to the diver. Cylinders are usually attached to a shoulder or chest D-ring and waist belt D-ring on each side.

==== Sling and sidemount rigging ====
The rigging of sling and sidemount cylinders is similar, but not identical. Sling rigging includes a bolt snap at the shoulder and one near the base of the cylinder, which are clipped to the main scuba harness, which may be either back or sidemount arrangement with D-rings or rails as attachment points. The sidemount cylinder rigging may omit the shoulder clip, and has a bungee loop on the harness to secure and confine the top end of the set.

== Accessories ==
=== Buoyancy compensator ===
In most scuba sets, a buoyancy compensator (BC) or buoyancy control device (BCD), such as a back-mounted wing or stabilizer jacket (also known as a "stab jacket"), is built into the harness. Although strictly speaking this is not a part of the breathing apparatus, it is usually connected to the diver's air supply, to provide easy inflation of the device. This can usually also be done manually via a mouthpiece, in order to save air while on the surface, or in case of a malfunction of the pressurized inflation system. The BCD inflates with air from the low pressure inflator hose to increase the volume of the scuba equipment and cause the diver gain buoyancy. Another button opens a valve to deflate the BCD and decrease the volume of the equipment and causes the diver to lose buoyancy. Some BCDs allow for integrated weight, meaning that the BCD has special pockets for the weights that can be dumped easily in case of an emergency. The function of the BCD, while underwater, is to keep the diver neutrally buoyant, i.e., neither floating up nor sinking. The BCD is used to compensate for the compression of a wet suit, and to compensate for the decrease of the diver's mass as the gas from the cylinders is used up.

=== Ballast ===
Ballast is used to increase the average density of the scuba diver and equipment to compensate for the buoyancy of diving equipment, particularly the diving suit, allowing the diver to fully submerge with ease by obtaining neutral or slightly negative buoyancy. Weighting systems originally consisted of solid lead blocks attached to a belt around the diver's waist, but some diving weighting systems are incorporated into the BCD or harness. These systems may use small nylon bags of lead shot or small weights which are distributed around the BCD, allowing a diver to gain a better overall weight distribution leading to a more horizontal trim in the water. Tank weights can be attached to the cylinder or threaded on the cambands holding the cylinder into the BCD.

=== Monitoring instruments ===
The basic instrument for monitoring available gas is the submersible pressure gauge, which indicates the remaining pressure in a scuba cylinder, by directly measuring pressure at a high-pressure port of the regulator first stage. Recreational divers commonly mount the SPG in a rubber or plastic console along with other instruments like a compass, depth gauge and/or dive computer. An alternative to the SPG is a pressure transmitter fitted to a high pressure port that wirelessly transmits the cylinder pressure to the dive computer for display, a system known as air integration.

Many closed circuit rebreathers use advanced electronics to monitor and regulate the composition of the breathing gas.

=== Labelling of contents ===
The composition of the gas in the scuba cylinder is analysed before use and recorded on a label on the cylinder. This is usually done directly after filling, when handing the cylinder over to the intended user, and when assembling the scuba set for use. The filler is responsible for ensuring that the mixture is within tolerance of the customer's specification, and the user, or in some cases the instructor, is responsible for ensuring that the mixture is suitable for the planned dive. Each person who analyses the gas is responsible for ensuring that the analysis matches the label on the cylinder. The default value is air, which does not always require a specific label. If the gas is air and the cylinder is identified for air only by colour code or labeling it man not be obligatory to analyse the contents.

=== Mouthpiece retaining straps ===
A mouthpiece retaining strap (MRS) is an item of safety equipment which is a mandatory design feature for rebreathers sold in the EU and UK, following European rebreather standard EN14143:2013. Mouthpiece retaining straps have been shown in navy experience over several years to be effective at protecting the airway in an unconscious rebreather diver as an alternative to a full-face mask. The arrangement is required to be adjustable or self adjusting, to hold the mouthpiece firmly and comfortably in the user's mouth, and to maintain a seal. The MRS also reduces stress on the jaw during the dive.

Mouthpiece retaining straps have also been used with open circuit scuba, both on single hose and twin hose units. They were quite common as original manufacturer's equipment in the 1960s, when they were usually called neck straps, but at some stage lost popularity. The technical diving community later developed a similar functioning accessory generally referred to as a reguator necklace or bungee necklace, an aftermarket or home made elastic loop, generally used to hold the secondary demand valve in a position under the chin where it can be accessed hands-free by tilting the head. It can also be used to hold a primary demand valve in the same way, which will keep it in close proximity to the face if accidentally dropped or dislodged, making it often possible to recover hands-free. This type of retainer does not necessarily keep the mouthpiece in place in the diver's mouth or maintain a seal if the diver loses consciousness, as the fit is not always adjustable. The bungee necklace can be pulled away from the neck with a moderate force, causing the rubber mouthpiece to pop out of the retaining loop.

=== Hose swivels ===
Swivel fittings between the low pressure hose and the second stage inlet connection are available which allow either a fixed angle or a variable angle between hose and demand valve housing. These allow a wider range of comfortable hose routings, particularly useful for stage and side-mount cylinders, but add another potential point of failure at the swivel joint. Swivels are also occasionally used between first stage and hose to provide better hose routing, but these usually have a fixed angle. The two types are not interchangeable, and can be recognised by the thread and O-ring arrangement.

=== Second stage isolation valve ===
A manually operated shut-off valve may be fitted between the low-pressure hose and the second stage, which can be used to isolate the second stage in a free-flow, or at any time when it is necessary. When this is fitted, an over-pressure relief valve us necessary on the first stage. Low profile valves operated by sliding an axial sleeve are available for this purpose and are less likely to snag than a quarter-turn ball valve, and are faster to operate than a screw-down valve, such as is standard on diving helmets for bailout.

=== Adaptor for full-face mask ===
Adaptors for some second stages are available to connect them to some models of full-face diving mask. The Dräger P-port system with a bayonet connector is used on Dräger Panorama masks, The Ocean Reef mask has a screw in connection, and the Kirby-Morgan 48 SuperMask uses a clip-on "pod" system

=== Diffuser ===
A diffuser is a component fitted over the exhaust outlet to break up the exhaled gas into bubbles small enough not to be seen above the surface the water, and make less noise (see acoustic signature). They are used in combat diving, to avoid detection by surface observers or by underwater hydrophones, Underwater mine disposal operations conducted by clearance divers, to make less noise, to reduce the risk of detonating acoustic mines, and in marine biology, to avoid disruption of fish behavior.

Designing an adequate diffuser for a rebreather is much easier than for open-circuit scuba, as the gas flow rate is generally much lower. An open-circuit diffuser system called the "scuba muffler" was prototyped by Eddie Paul in the early 1990s for underwater photographers John McKenney and Marty Snyderman; the prototype had two large filter stones mounted on the back of the cylinder with a hose connected to the exhaust ports of the second-stage regulator. The filter stones were mounted on a hinged arm to float 1 to 2 feet (30 to 60 cm) above the diver, to set up a depth-pressure-differential suction effect to counteract the extra exhalation pressure needed to breathe out through the diffuser. The scuba muffler was claimed to cut the exhalation noise by 90%. Closed circuit rebreathers proved more useful in letting divers get near sharks.

== Gas endurance of a scuba set ==
Gas endurance of a scuba set is the time that the gas supply will last during a dive. This is influenced by the type of scuba set and the circumstances in which it is used.

=== Open circuit ===
The gas endurance of open-circuit-demand scuba depends on factors such as the capacity (volume of gas) in the diving cylinder, the depth of the dive and the breathing rate of the diver, which is dependent on exertion, fitness, physical size of the diver, state of mind, and experience, among other factors. New divers frequently consume all the air in a standard "aluminum 80" cylinder in 30 minutes or less on a typical dive, while experienced divers frequently dive for 60 to 70 minutes at the same average depth, using the same capacity cylinder, as they have learned more efficient diving techniques.

An open-circuit diver whose breathing rate at the surface (atmospheric pressure) is 15 litres per minute will consume 3 × 15 = 45 litres of gas per minute at 20 metres. [(20 m/10 m per bar) + 1 bar atmospheric pressure] × 15 L/min = 45 L/min). If an 11-litre cylinder filled to 200 bar is to be used until there is a reserve of 17% there is (83% × 200 × 11) = 1826 litres available. At 45 L/min the dive at depth will be a maximum of 40.5 minutes (1826/45). These depths and times are typical of experienced recreational divers leisurely exploring a coral reef using standard 200 bar "aluminum 80" cylinders as may be rented from a commercial recreational diving operation in most tropical island or coastal resorts.

=== Semi-closed rebreather ===
A semi-closed circuit rebreather may have an endurance of about 3 to 10 times that of the equivalent open-circuit dive, and is less affected by depth; gas is recycled but fresh gas must be constantly injected to replace at least the oxygen used, and any excess gas from this must be vented. Although it uses gas more economically, the weight of the rebreather encourages the diver to carry smaller cylinders. Still, most semi-closed systems allow at least twice the duration of average sized open-circuit systems (around two hours) and are often limited by scrubber endurance.

=== Closed circuit rebreathers ===
An oxygen rebreather diver or a fully closed circuit rebreather diver consumes about 1 litre of oxygen corrected to atmospheric pressure per minute. Except during ascent or descent, the fully closed circuit rebreather that is operating correctly uses very little or no diluent. A diver with a 3-litre oxygen cylinder filled to 200 bar who leaves 25% in reserve will be able to do a 450-minute = 7.5 hour dive (75% × 3 litres × 200 bar × 1 litre per minute = 450 minutes). This endurance is independent of depth. The life of the soda lime scrubber is likely to be less than this and so will be the limiting factor of the dive.

In practice, dive times for rebreathers are more often influenced by other factors, such as water temperature and the need for safe ascent (see Decompression (diving)), and this is generally also true for large-capacity open-circuit sets.

== Hazards and safety ==
Scuba sets contain breathing gas at high pressure. The stored energy of the gas can do considerable damage if released in an uncontrolled manner. The highest risk is during charging of cylinders, but injuries have also occurred when cylinders have been stored in excessively hot environment, which can increase the gas pressure and may occasionally result in explosive rupture of damaged cylinders, by the use of incompatible cylinder valves, which can blow out under load, or by rupture of regulator hoses in contact with the user, as a pressure of more than 100 pounds per square inch (6.9 bar) can rupture the skin, and inject gas into the tissues, along with possible contaminants.

Scuba is safety-critical equipment, as some modes of failure can put the user at immediate risk of death by drowning, and a catastrophic failure of a scuba cylinder can instantly kill or severely injure persons in the vicinity. Open circuit scuba is considered highly reliable if correctly assembled, tested, filled, maintained and used, and the risk of failure is fairly low, but high enough that it should be considered in dive planning, and where appropriate, precautions should be taken to allow appropriate response in case of a failure. Mitigation options depend on the circumstances and mode of failure.

== Ergonomics ==
When the diver carries several diving cylinders, especially those made of steel, lack of buoyancy can be a problem, particularly at the start of a dive when they are all full, and the variation of buoyancy during the dive as the gas is used can require high-capacity buoyancy compensators to allow the diver to effectively maintain neutral buoyancy throughout the dive.{{}}

A large number of cylinders, hoses and fittings passing through the water tends to increase hydrodynamic drag, reducing swimming efficiency.

== History ==
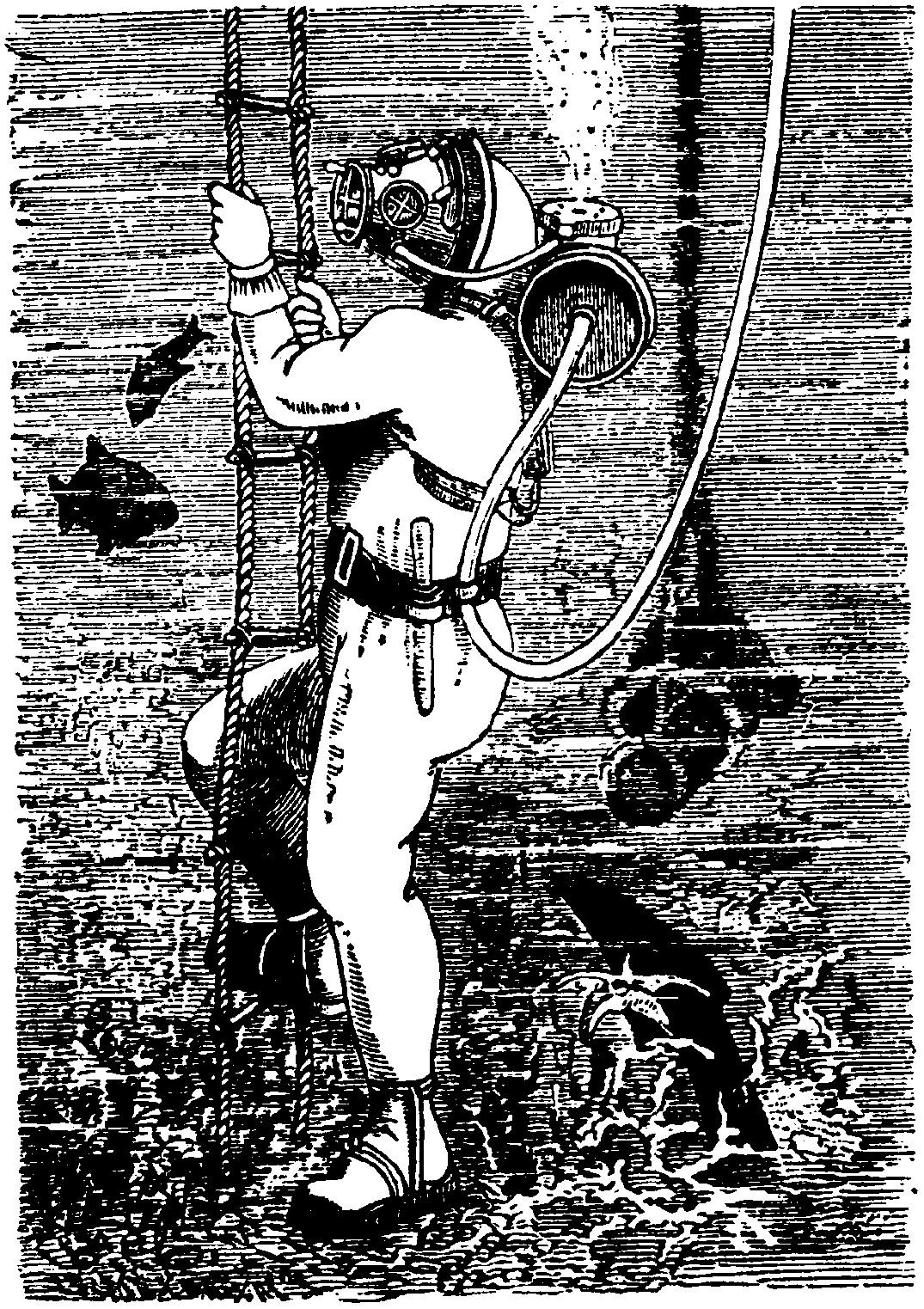
The Rouquayrol-Denayrouze apparatus was the first regulator to be mass-produced (from 1865 to 1965). In this picture the air reservoir presents its surface-supplied configuration.

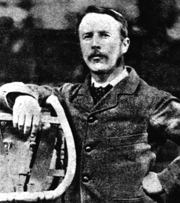
Henry Fleuss (1851–1932) improved the rebreather technology.

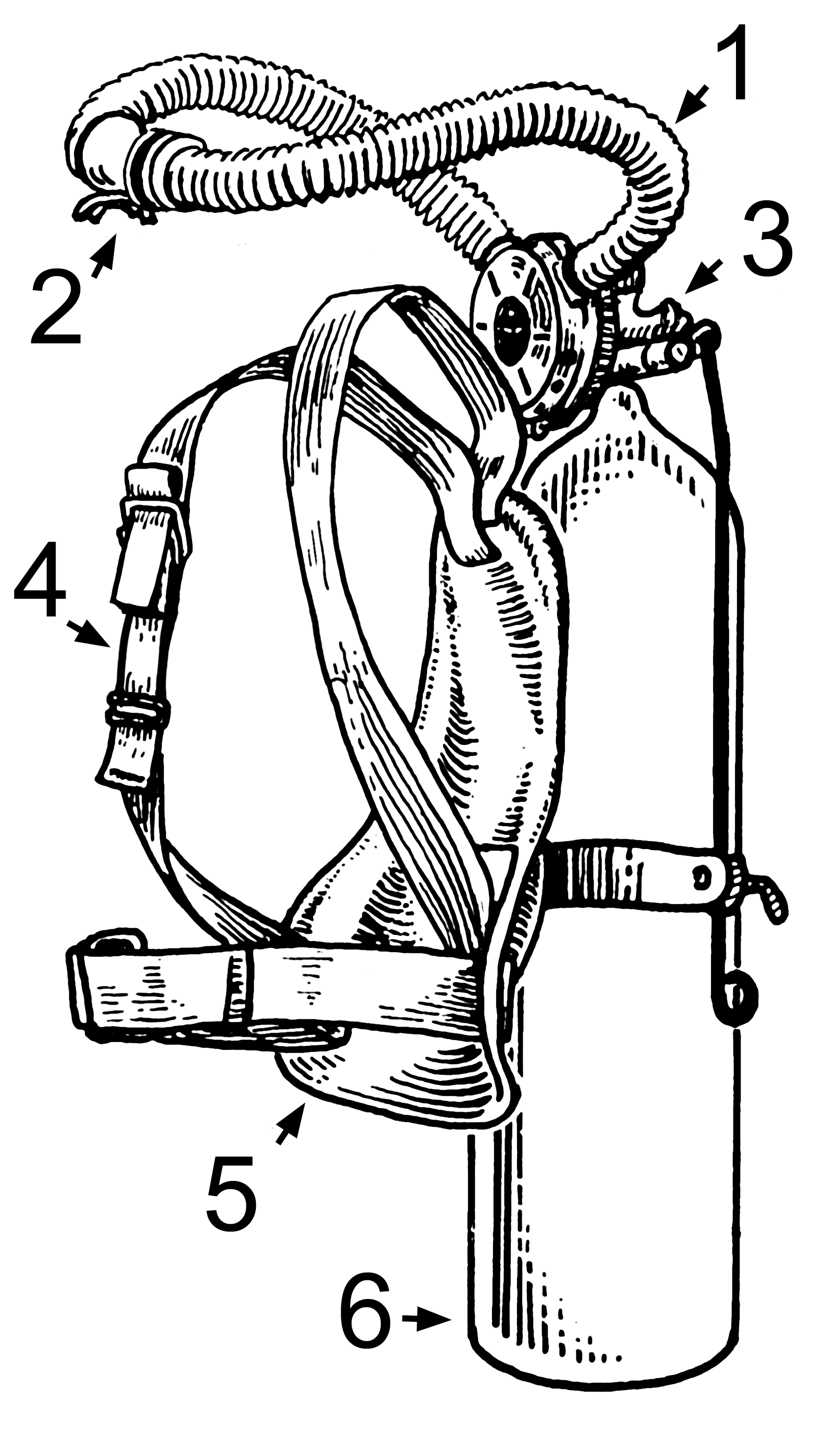
Aqualung scuba set.: 1. Breathing hose; 2. Mouthpiece; 3. Cylinder valve and regulator; 4. Harness; 5. Backplate; 6. Cylinder

By the turn of the twentieth century, two basic architectures for underwater breathing apparatus had been pioneered; open-circuit surface supplied equipment where the diver's exhaled gas is vented directly into the water, and closed-circuit breathing apparatus where the diver's carbon dioxide is filtered from unused oxygen, which is then recirculated. Closed circuit equipment was more easily adapted to scuba in the absence of reliable, portable, and economical high pressure gas storage vessels. By the mid twentieth century, high pressure cylinders were available and two systems for scuba had emerged: open-circuit scuba where the diver's exhaled breath is vented directly into the water, and closed-circuit scuba where the carbon dioxide is removed from the diver's exhaled breath which has oxygen added and is recirculated. Oxygen rebreathers are severely depth limited due to oxygen toxicity risk, which increases with depth, and the available systems for mixed gas rebreathers were fairly bulky and designed for use with diving helmets. The first commercially practical scuba rebreather was designed and built by the diving engineer Henry Fleuss in 1878, while working for Siebe Gorman in London. His self contained breathing apparatus consisted of a rubber mask connected to a breathing bag, with an estimated 50–60% oxygen supplied from a copper tank and carbon dioxide scrubbed by passing it through a bundle of rope yarn soaked in a solution of caustic potash, the system giving a dive duration of up to about three hours. This apparatus had no way of measuring the gas composition during use. During the 1930s and all through World War II, the British, Italians and Germans developed and extensively used oxygen rebreathers to equip the first frogmen. The British adapted the Davis Submerged Escape Apparatus and the Germans adapted the Dräger submarine escape rebreathers, for their frogmen during the war. In the U.S. Major Christian J. Lambertsen invented an underwater free-swimming oxygen rebreather in 1939, which was accepted by the Office of Strategic Services. In 1952 he patented a modification of his apparatus, this time named SCUBA, (an acronym for "self-contained underwater breathing apparatus"), which became the generic English word for autonomous breathing equipment for diving, and later for the activity using the equipment. After World War II, military frogmen continued to use rebreathers since they do not make bubbles which would give away the presence of the divers. The high percentage of oxygen used by these early rebreather systems limited the depth at which they could be used due to the risk of convulsions caused by acute oxygen toxicity.

Although a working demand regulator system had been invented in 1864 by Auguste Denayrouze and Benoît Rouquayrol, the first open-circuit scuba system developed in 1925 by Yves Le Prieur in France was a manually adjusted free-flow system with a low endurance, which limited the practical usefulness of the system. In 1942, during the German occupation of France, Jacques-Yves Cousteau and Émile Gagnan designed the first successful and safe open-circuit scuba, known as the Aqua-Lung. Their system combined an improved demand regulator with high-pressure air tanks. This was patented in 1945. To sell his regulator in English-speaking countries Cousteau registered the Aqua-Lung trademark, which was first licensed to the U.S. Divers company, and in 1948 to Siebe Gorman of England, Siebe Gorman was allowed to sell in Commonwealth countries, but had difficulty in meeting the demand and the U.S. patent prevented others from making the product. The patent was circumvented by Ted Eldred of Melbourne, Australia, who developed the single-hose open-circuit scuba system, which separates the first stage and demand valve of the pressure regulator by a low-pressure hose, puts the demand valve at the diver's mouth, and releases exhaled gas through the demand valve casing. Eldred sold the first Porpoise Model CA single hose scuba early in 1952.

Early scuba sets were usually provided with a plain harness of shoulder straps and waist belt. The waist belt buckles were usually quick-release, and shoulder straps sometimes had adjustable or quick release buckles. Many harnesses did not have a backplate, and the cylinders rested directly against the diver's back. Early scuba divers dived without a buoyancy aid. In an emergency they had to jettison their weights. In the 1960s adjustable buoyancy life jackets (ABLJ) became available, which can be used to compensate for loss of buoyancy at depth due to compression of the neoprene wetsuit and as a lifejacket that will hold an unconscious diver face-upwards at the surface, and that can be quickly inflated. The first versions were inflated from a small disposable carbon dioxide cylinder, later with a small direct coupled air cylinder. A low-pressure feed from the regulator first-stage to an inflation/deflation valve unit an oral inflation valve and a dump valve lets the volume of the ABLJ be controlled as a buoyancy aid. In 1971 the stabilizer jacket was introduced by ScubaPro. This class of buoyancy aid is known as a buoyancy control device or buoyancy compensator.

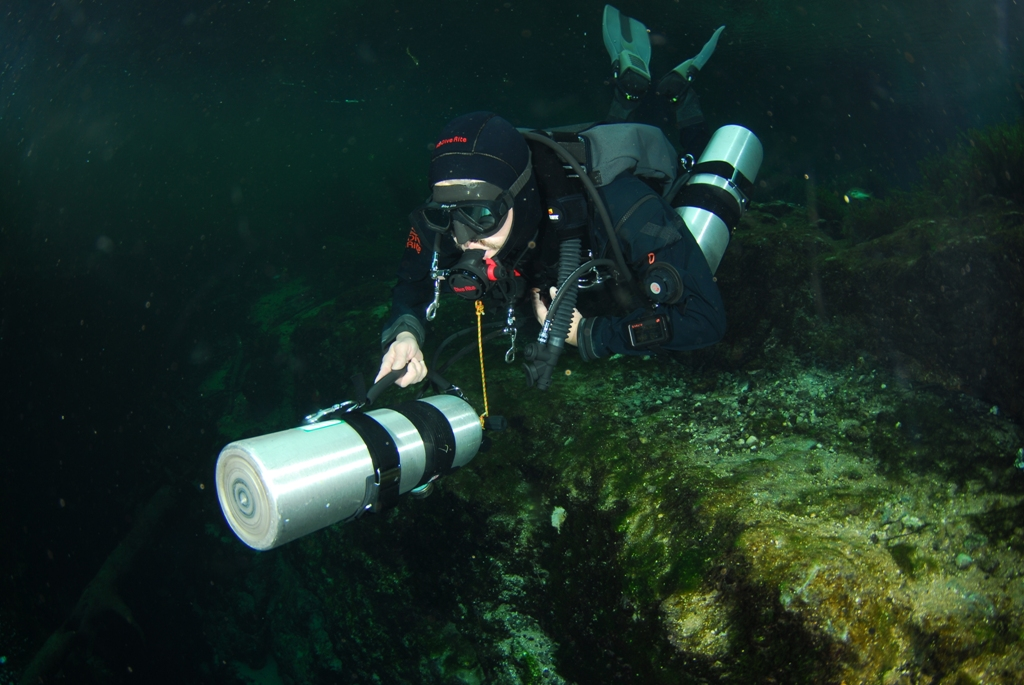
Sidemount diver pushing a cylinder in front

A backplate and wing is an alternative configuration of scuba harness with a buoyancy compensation bladder known as a "wing" mounted behind the diver, sandwiched between the backplate and the cylinder or cylinders. Unlike stabilizer jackets, the backplate and wing is a modular system, in that it consists of separable components. This arrangement became popular with cave divers making long or deep dives, who needed to carry several extra cylinders, as it clears the front and sides of the diver for other equipment to be attached in the region where it is easily accessible. This additional equipment is usually suspended from the harness or carried in pockets on the exposure suit. Sidemount is a scuba diving equipment configuration which has basic scuba sets, each comprising a single cylinder with a dedicated regulator and pressure gauge, mounted alongside the diver, clipped to the harness below the shoulders and along the hips, instead of on the back of the diver. It originated as a configuration for advanced cave diving, as it facilitates penetration of tight sections of cave as, sets can be easily removed and remounted when necessary. The configuration allows easy access to cylinder valves, and provides easy and reliable gas redundancy. These benefits for operating in confined spaces were also recognized by divers who made wreck diving penetrations. Sidemount diving has grown in popularity within the technical diving community for general decompression diving, and has become a popular specialty for recreational diving.

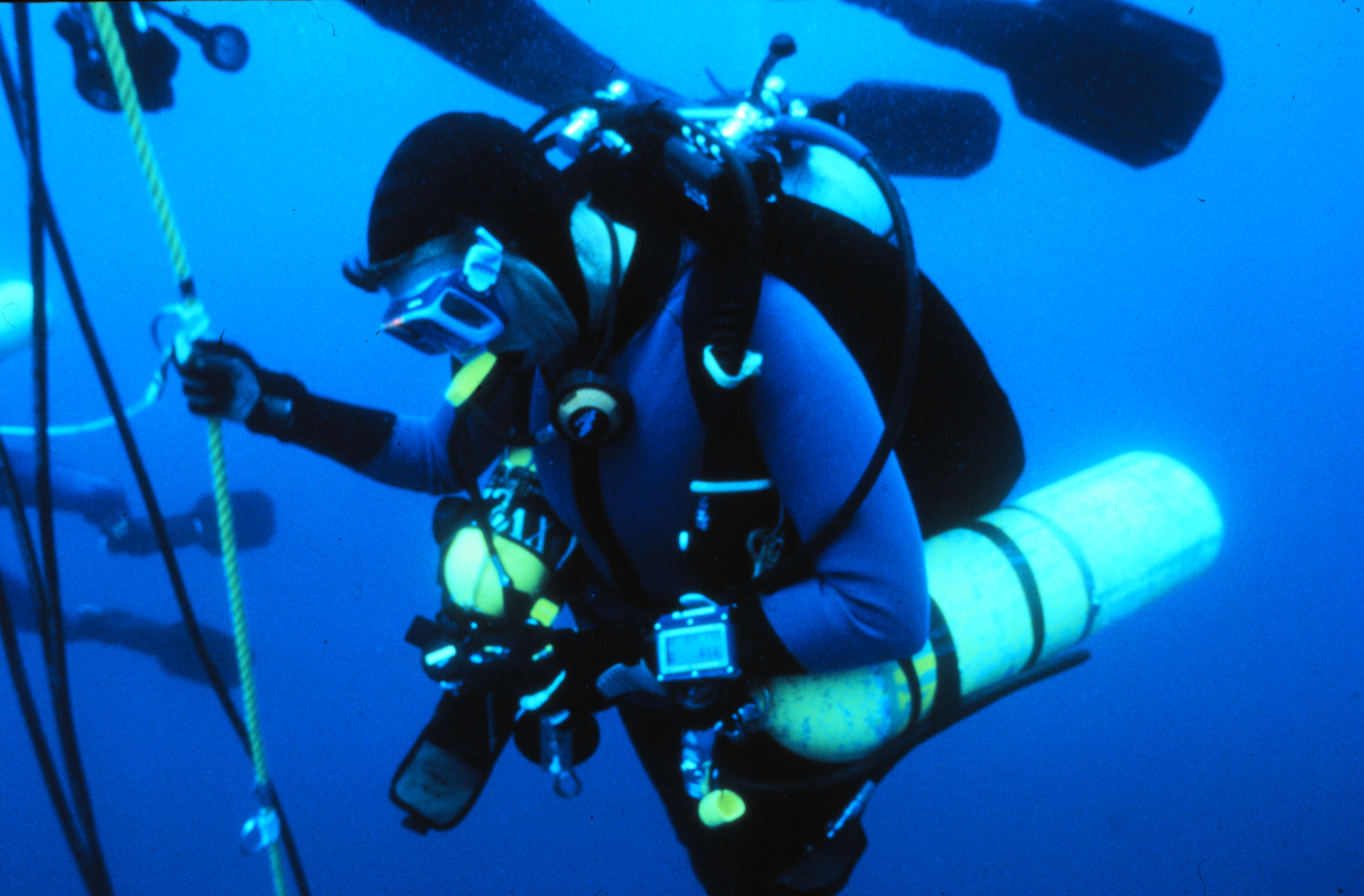
Technical diver during a decompression stop

Technical diving is recreational scuba diving that exceeds the generally accepted recreational limits, and may expose the diver to hazards beyond those normally associated with recreational diving, and to greater risks of serious injury or death. These risks may be reduced by appropriate skills, knowledge and experience, and by using suitable equipment and procedures. The concept and term are both relatively recent advents, although divers had already been engaging in what is now commonly referred to as technical diving for decades. One reasonably widely held definition is that any dive in which at some point of the planned profile it is not physically possible or physiologically acceptable to make a direct and uninterrupted vertical ascent to surface air is a technical dive. The equipment often involves breathing gases other than air or standard nitrox mixtures, multiple gas sources, and different equipment configurations. Over time, some equipment and techniques developed for technical diving have become more widely accepted for recreational diving.

The challenges of deeper dives and longer penetrations and the large amounts of breathing gas necessary for these dive profiles and ready availability of oxygen sensing cells beginning in the late 1980s led to a resurgence of interest in rebreather diving. By accurately measuring the partial pressure of oxygen, it became possible to maintain and accurately monitor a breathable gas mixture in the loop at any depth. In the mid-1990s semi-closed circuit rebreathers became available for the recreational scuba market, followed by closed circuit rebreathers around the turn of the millennium. Rebreathers are currently (2018) manufactured for the military, technical and recreational scuba markets.

== See also ==
- Timeline of diving technology – Chronological list of notable events in the history of underwater diving equipment
- List of diver certification organizations – Agencies which issue certification for competence in diving skills

== Bibliography ==
- Davis, Robert H (1955). Deep Diving and Submarine Operations (6th ed.). Tolworth, Surbiton, Surrey: Siebe Gorman & Company Ltd.

== External images ==
- www.divingmachines.com – Vintage aqualungs including three-cylinder types
