= Index of underwater diving: L–N =

Alphabetical listing of underwater diving related topics

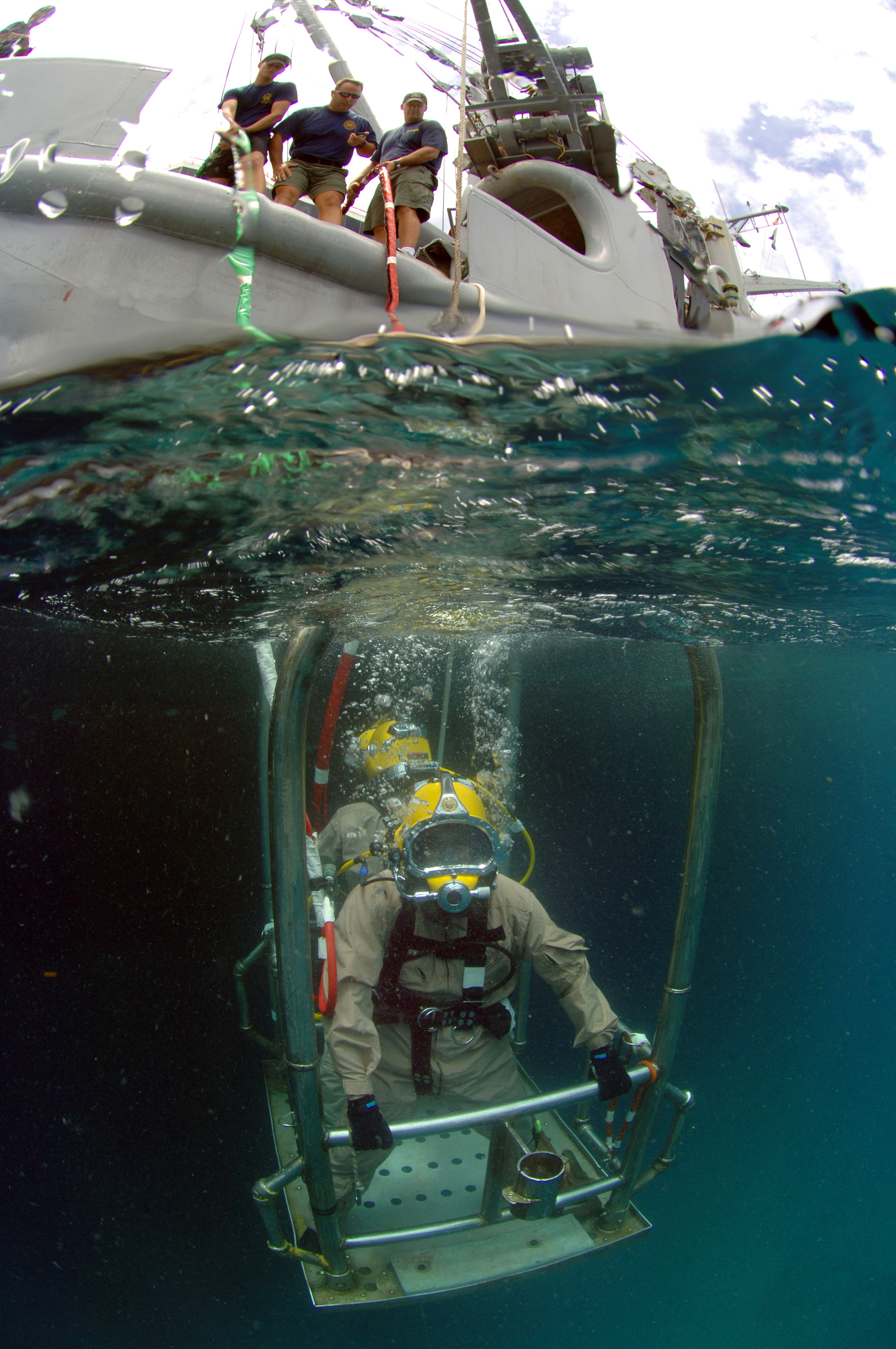
Surface-supplied divers riding a stage to the underwater workplace

The following index is provided as an overview of and topical guide to underwater diving: Links to articles and redirects to sections of articles which provide information on each topic are listed with a short description of the topic. When there is more than one article with information on a topic, the most relevant is usually listed, and it may be cross-linked to further information from the linked page or section.

Underwater diving can be described as all of the following:

- A human activity – intentional, purposive, conscious and subjectively meaningful sequence of actions. Underwater diving is practiced as part of an occupation, or for recreation, where the practitioner submerges below the surface of the water or other liquid for a period which may range between seconds to order of a day at a time, either exposed to the ambient pressure or isolated by a pressure resistant suit, to interact with the underwater environment for pleasure, competitive sport, or as a means to reach a work site for profit or in the pursuit of knowledge, and may use no equipment at all, or a wide range of equipment which may include breathing apparatus, environmental protective clothing, aids to vision, communication, propulsion, maneuverability, buoyancy control and safety equipment, and tools for the task at hand.

There are seven sub-indexes, listed here. The tables of content should link between them automatically:

- Index of underwater diving: A–C
- Index of underwater diving: D–E
- Index of underwater diving: F–K
- Index of underwater diving: L–N
- Index of underwater diving: O–R
- Index of underwater diving: S
- Index of underwater diving: T–Z

== L ==
Contents: Top	0–9	A	B	C	D	E	F	G	H	I	J	K	L	M	N	O	P	Q	R	S	T	U	V	W	X	Y	Z

Section contents: Top of section, La, Le, Li, Lo, Lr, Lu–Ly

=== La ===
- Ladder pattern search – Search pattern with evenly spaced parallel legs
- LAMA bubble helmet – Type of underwater diving helmet
- Lambertsen Amphibious Respiratory Unit (LARU) – Early closed circuit oxygen diving rebreather
- Lambertsen, Christian J. – American medical researcher (1917–2011)
- LAR-5 – Military oxygen tebreather by Drägerwerk
- LAR-6 – Military oxygen rebreather by Drägerwerk
- LAR-V – Military oxygen rebreather by Drägerwerk
- Laryngospasm – Involuntary contraction of the vocal folds restricting inhalation
- The Last Dive – Non-fiction book by Bernie Chowdhury about a double wreck diving fatality
- Latent hypoxia – Lung gas and blood oxygen concentration sufficient to support consciousness only at depth
- Launch and recovery system (diving) – Equipment used to deploy and recover a diving bell, stage, or ROV
- Lazy shot – A diving shotline which does not reach the bottom

=== Le ===
Section contents: Top of section, La, Le, Li, Lo, Lr, Lu–Ly

- Legal aspects of underwater diving, also known as legal aspects of diving – How diving activities are affected by law
- Le Prieur, Yves – French naval officer and inventor of a free-flow scuba system

=== Li ===
Section contents: Top of section, La, Le, Li, Lo, Lr, Lu–Ly

- Life-support equipment – Equipment which is necessary to support life in a hostile environment
- Life support supervisor – Senior life support technician
- Life support technician – A member of a saturation diving team who operates the surface habitat
- Life-support system – Technology that allows survival in hostile environments
- Life support system operation – Operation of the systems which are necessary for the survival of the occupants
- Lifeline (diving) – A rope connecting the diver to an attendant, usually at the surface
- Lifting bag – Airtight bag used for underwater buoyant lifting when filled with air
- Light head – Dive light with cable power supply from a battery canister
- Lightweight demand diving helmet, also known as lightweight demand helmet – Diving helmet supported by the head and neck
- Lightweight diving helmet – Diving helmet supported by the head and neck
- Limpet mine – Naval mine attached to a target by magnets
- Line arrow – Marker used on cave guide lines to provide safety information to divers
- Line holder – Simple device for storing and deploying line underwater
- Line marker – Marker used on cave guide lines to provide safety information to divers
- Lipid – Substance of biological origin that is soluble in nonpolar solvents
- Liquid breathing – Respiration of oxygen-rich liquid by a normally air-breathing organism
- List of British records in finswimming
- List of Commonwealth records in finswimming
- List of DAN publications – List of Divers Alert Network publications
- List of decompression researchers – People known for esearch in decompression physiology and medicine
- List of designations under the Protection of Wrecks Act – All sites designated under the UK Protection of Wrecks Act
- List of diver certification organisations – Agencies which issue certification for competence in diving skills
- List of diver certification organizations – Agencies which issue certification for competence in diving skills
- List of Divers Alert Network publications
- List of diving environments by hazard – Example types of a class of diving hazard
- List of diving environments by type – Variety of environments that people may dive in
- List of diving hazards and precautions – Hazards associated with underwater diving
- List of European records in finswimming
- List of freediver training agencies – Organisation setting standards and providing certification for freedivers
- List of legislation regulating underwater diving – List of national and state legislation regulating underwater diving
- List of military diving units
- List of notable scuba divers – List of biographical articles about scuba divers
- List of recreational scuba diving certification agencies – Organisations providing training standards and certification for recreational scuba diving
- List of researchers in diving physiology and medicine
- List of researchers in underwater diving – People who made discoveries or inventions in the science or technology of underwater diving
- List of scuba divers – Hierarchical outline list of biographical articles about underwater divers
- List of shipwrecks in international waters
- List of shipwrecks of Africa
- List of shipwrecks of Asia
- List of shipwrecks of Europe
- List of shipwrecks of Hong Kong
- List of shipwrecks of North America
- List of shipwrecks of Oceania
- List of shipwrecks of South America
- List of shipwrecks of the Isles of Scilly
- List of shipwrecks of the Isles of Scilly (19th century)
- List of signs and symptoms of diving disorders – Evidence of physiological disorders resulting from underwater diving
- List of types of diving environments – Variety of environments that people may dive in
- List of undersea explorers
- List of underwater divers – List of underwater divers whose exploits have made them notable.
- List of underwater diving environments – Variety of environments that people may dive in
- List of underwater diving equipment manufacturers – Current and historic manufacturers of equipment specifically intended for use for underwater diving
- List of underwater diving hazards and precautions – Hazards associated with underwater diving
- List of underwater explorers
- List of United States Navy SEALs – Notable members of the US Navy SEALs and UDTs
- List of United States records in finswimming
- List of world records in finswimming
- List of wreck diving sites
- Lists of shipwrecks
- Little Blue Lake – Flooded sinkhole dive site in South Australia
- Live-boat diving – Diving from a boat which is under way (not moored)
- Live-boating – Diving from a vessel under way
- Liveaboard dive boat, also known as liveaboard – Vessel providing support for diving tourists

=== Lo ===
Section contents: Top of section, La, Le, Li, Lo, Lr, Lu–Ly

- Lobster hook – Implement for extracting lobsters from holes
- Localised pressure differential – Area with strong flow caused by a local pressure differential
- Lock-in (diving) – Enter an enclosed environment at a different pressure to ambient through an air-lock
- Locking collar (diving helmet) – Component to prevent accidental removal of a diving helmet
- Lock-off – Split a secure airtight connection between two pressurised chambers via an airlock
- Lock-on (diving) – Make a secure airtight connection between two pressurised chambers via an airlock
- Lock-out (diving) – Exit an enclosed environment at a different pressure to ambient through an air-lock
- Lock-out submersible – Submersible with an airlock and diving chamber from which divers can be deployed
- Lockout–tagout (LOTO) – Safe isolation of dangerous equipment during maintenance or testing
- Lockout chamber – Compartment on a submarine which can be equalised with ambient pressure to allow exit or entry
- Lockout trunk – Compartment on a submarine which can be equalised with ambient pressure to allow exit or entry
- London Diving Chamber Dive Lectures – Series of public lectures that have been hosted at the Royal Geographical Society in London
- Long distance part of the 2011 Finswimming World Championships – International competition in Hódmezővásárhely, Hungary
- Long hose regulator – Hose which allows two divers sharing gas to swim though a restriction
- Long term effects of underwater diving – Effects of long term exposure without clinical symptoms
- Long term health effects of diving – Effects of frequent underwater diving on health
- Long-Term Mine Reconnaissance System – American torpedo tube-launched underwater search and survey unmanned undersea vehicle
- Longshore current – Sediment moved by the longshore current
- Longshore drift – Sediment moved by the longshore current
- Loop flush – Rebreather diving safety procedure
- Loop rebreather – Rebreather architecture with one-way flow
- Loss of the continuous guideline – Separation from the line marking the way out of a diving penetration
- Lost buddy procedure – Standard procedure for dive buddy separation
- Lost guide line – Scuba penetration diving emergency
- Low energy coast – Shoreline protected from high energy waves
- Low Impact Diver – PADI specialty to improve poor buoyancy, trim and finning skills in recreational divers
- Low impact diving – Scuba diving that has minimal environmental effect
- Low pressure breathing air compressor – Machine to provide atmospheric air at low pressure for breathing
- Low visibility (diving) – Water conditions in which objects cannot be seen for a long distance
- Low visibility diving – Diving in a turbud diving medium

=== Lr ===
Section contents: Top of section, La, Le, Li, Lo, Lr, Lu–Ly

- LR5 – Crewed submersible for submarine rescue
- LR7 – Crewed submersible undersea rescue vehicle

=== Lu–Ly ===
Section contents: Top of section, La, Le, Li, Lo, Lr, Lu–Ly

- Lung over-expansion injury – Injury to the lungs caused by gas expansion until the tissues rupture
- Lung over-pressure injury – Damage to lungs caused by internal overpressure
- Lung overexpansion injury – Injury to the lungs caused by excessive internal pressure
- Lung overpressure injury – Injury to the lungs caused by excessive internal pressure
- Lunocet – Biomimetic monofin
- Luxfer – Multinational manufacturer of seamless aluminium pressure vessels
- Lyons Maritime Museum – Diving history museum in St. Augustine, Florida

== M ==
Contents: Top	0–9	A	B	C	D	E	F	G	H	I	J	K	L	M	N	O	P	Q	R	S	T	U	V	W	X	Y	Z

Section contents: Top of section, Ma, Mc–Me, Mi–Mk, Mn–Mo, Ms–Mv

=== Ma ===
- Macro life – Organisms suitable for macro photography
- Macro photography – Photography genre and techniques of extreme close-up pictures
- Magnesium torch – Bright light source made from magnesium, which burns underwater
- Man in the Sea Museum – Diving museum in Panama City Beach, FL, USA
- Management of multiple cylinders – Techniques for carrying and using multiple scuba sets
- Manifold (scuba) – Component to functionally connect scuba cylinders
- Manifold cage – Fitting on diving cylinder to protect manifold and valves
- Manifolded twin scuba set, also known as manifolded twin set or manifolded twins – Two scuba cylinders functionally connected by a manifold
- Manta ray night dive – Ecotourism diving experience
- Manually controlled closed circuit rebreather – Rebreather in which the oxygen content of the loop gas is controlled by the diver
- MARCOS – Indian Navy special operations force
- Mares (scuba equipment) – Italian manufacturer of underwater diving equipment.
- Marine Commandos – Marine special operations group of the Lebanese Army
- Marinejegerkommandoen – Norwegian naval special operations unit
- Maritime archaeology – Archaeological study of human interaction with the sea
- Maritime archaeology in Australia – Study of Australia's underwater heritage
- Maritime Archaeology Sea Trust – Charitable trust in the UK
- Maritime Archaeology Trust – Charitable organization in Great Britain
- Mark IV Amphibian – British military oxygen rebreather
- Mary Rose – English Tudor warship (1511–1545)
- Mass fraction blending – Mixing gas by measuring added mass of each component
- Master diver (United States Navy) – Senior diver rating in US Navy
- Master Instructor – Grade of recreational dive instructor with some experience
- Master Scuba Diver – Scuba diver certification
- Maximum operating depth – Safety concept in underwater diving
- Maximum voluntary ventilation – Limit of amount than can be breathed in a minute
- Maya AUV India – Autonomous underwater vehicle from National Institute of Oceanography, India

=== Mc–Me ===
Section contents: Top of section, Ma, Mc–Me, Mi–Mk, Mn–Mo, Ms–Mv

- McCann Rescue Chamber – Diving bell for rescuing submariners
- Mechanical dead space – Space in breathing apparatus in which the breathing gas must flow in both directions
- Mechanism of diving regulators, also known as mechanism of the diving regulator – Arrangement and function of the components of regulators for underwater diving
- Media diver – Professional diver working in the media sector
- Media diving – Underwater diving in support of the media industries
- Medical Examiner of Divers – Doctor registered as competent to assess medical fitness to dive
- Medical fitness to dive – The medical fitness of a person to function safely underwater under pressure
- Medical lock – Small airlock for transfer of medical supplies
- Medical oxygen – Oxygen used for therapeutic purposes
- Medical plastic oxygen mask – Disposable mask for providing oxygen therapy
- Medical statement (diving) – Document claiming medical fitness for recreational scuba diving
- Medically fit to dive – State of a person who has no medical constraints preventing them from underwater diving
- Membrane gas separation – Technology for splitting specific gases out of mixtures
- Messenger line – Light line used to pull heavier cable or lower a package along a downline
- Metabolically inert gas – Non-toxic gas that is not used or produced by metabolic process
- Metabolism – Set of chemical reactions in organisms
- Metre sea water, also known as metre seawater – Unit of pressure equal to one tenth of a bar

=== Mi–Mk ===
Section contents: Top of section, Ma, Mc–Me, Mi–Mk, Mn–Mo, Ms–Mv

- Micropore scrubber cartridge – Carbon dioxide absorptive cartridge
- Middle ear barotrauma – Pressure injury to the middle ear
- Midwater, also known as mid-water – In the water column between surface and bottom
- Midwater downline – A weighted line suspended from a floating support in deep water
- Military diver – Underwater diver of a military unit
- Military diver training – Training of underwater divers for service in the armed forces
- Military diving – Underwater diving in a military context by members of an armed force
- Mills, Linnea – Diver who drowned during a PADI training dive
- Mine escape set – Portable breathing apparatus intended for escape from compromised mines
- Minedykkerkommandoen – Norwegian Navy clearance diver unit
- Minentaucher – Mine clearance divers of the German Navy
- Minimum gas principle – Minimum breathing gas for safe ascent for given depth and time to surface
- Minimum operating depth – Depth above which the oxygen concentration is too low to breathe safely
- Mini Rover ROV – Small, low cost observation class remotely operated underwater vehicle
- Mir (submersible) – Self-propelled deep submergence vehicle
- Missed decompression – Unsafe adcent from dive
- Mission 31 – Undersea expedition organized by Fabien Cousteau
- Mitchell, Simon – New Zealand physician and author on diving medicine
- Mitigation – Reduction of something harmful or the reduction of its harmful effects
- Mixed gas (diving) – Breathing gases mixtures blended for use in underwater diving
- Mixed gas diving – Underwater diving breathing gases mixed for the purpose
- Mixed gas rebreather – Rebreather using gas other than only oxygen
- Mixed excursion – Saturation dive where ambient pressure is both less and more than storage pressure
- Mk 1 Underwater Defense Gun – Underwater firearm developed by the United States during the Cold War
- MK V Deep Sea Diving Dress – Standard diving dress of the US Navy
- Mk V Mod 1 Heliox helmet – US Navy standard diving helmet modified for heliox

=== Mn–Mo ===
Section contents: Top of section, Ma, Mc–Me, Mi–Mk, Mn–Mo, Ms–Mv

- MN90 decompression tables, also known as Table Marine National MN90 – French navy decompression tables
- Mode of decompression – Specific method, circumstances, and equipment of decompression
- Mode of diving, also known as Mode of underwater diving – The conceptual methods of underwater diving
- Modes of underwater diving – Techniques requiring specific equipment and procedures
- Modulated ultrasound – Technology for transmitting signals through water
- Moir, Ernest William – British civil engineer credited with inventing the first medical airlock
- Molecular diffusion – Thermal motion of liquid or gas particles at temperatures above absolute zero
- Momsen, Charles – US Navy admiral, submarine rescue (1896–1967)
- Monitoring decompression status – Keeping appraised of whether and how much decompression is required by a diver
- Monitoring gas during a dive – Remaining aware of remaining breathing gas quantities
- Monitoring the progress and status of the dive – Underwater diving safety procedure
- Monkey diving – Sidemount diving with a single cylinder
- Monofin – Single blade swimfin attached to both feet
- Moon pool – Opening in the base of a hull, platform, or chamber giving access to the water below
- Morse Diving – American manufacturer of diving equipment
- Morse Engineering Mk 12 helmet – US Navy deep water free-flow helmet
- Motion sickness – Nausea caused by motion or perceived motion
- Motorised Submersible Canoe – WWII British frogman delivery vehicle
- Mouth-to-mouth resuscitation – Artificial ventilation using exhaled air from the rescuer
- Mouthpiece (breathing apparatus) – Respiratory user interface
- Mouthpiece retaining strap – Safety item for scuba diving, particularly with a rebreather

=== Ms–Mv ===
Section contents: Top of section, Ma, Mc–Me, Mi–Mk, Mn–Mo, Ms–Mv

- MSDS Marine – British marine and coastal archaeological contractor
- MSM-1 – Italian deep-submergence rescue vehicle
- Msw – Metre of sea water, a unit of pressure
- Muck diving – Recreational diving on a loose sedimentary bottom
- Multi-level dive – Scuba diving in consecutively shallower depth ranges on one dive
- Muscle memory, also known as muscle-memory – Consolidating a motor task into memory through repetition
- Mushroom valve (diving) – Rubber non-return valve
- M-value (decompression) – Maximum inert gas supersaturation allowed for a tissue in decompression theory}

== N ==
Contents: Top	0–9	A	B	C	D	E	F	G	H	I	J	K	L	M	N	O	P	Q	R	S	T	U	V	W	X	Y	Z

Section: Top of section, Na, Ne, Ni, No, Nu

=== Na ===
- Namibian Marine Corps – Combat body created in 2016
- National Academy of Scuba Educators (NASE) – Recreational scuba training and certification agency
- National Association for Cave Diving (NACD) – American non-profit organization for improving cave diving safety
- National Association of Underwater Instructors (NAUI) – Non-profit training and certification agency association of scuba instructors
- National Board of Diving and Hyperbaric Medical Technology – Non-profit organization for education and certification in diving and hyperbaric medicine
- National Diving and Activity Centre – Flooded quarry in Gloucestershire, England
- National Navy UDT-SEAL Museum – Museum of US Navy special forces units
- National Oceanic and Atmospheric Administration (NOAA) – US government scientific agency
- National Speleological Society Cave Diving Section (NSSCDS) – Organization for exploration, conservation, and study of flooded caves in the US
- NATO Submarine Rescue System – Project to develop an international submarine rescue system
- Nautical Archaeology Program – Graduate degree program at Texas A&M University
- Nautical Archaeology Society (NAS) – British organisation to further research in nautical archaeology for the public benefit
- Nautile – Crewed submersible owned by Ifremer
- Naval Air Command Sub Aqua Club – British organization within the Royal Navy
- Naval diving – Diving in navy applications
- Naval Diving Unit (Singapore) – Maritime special forces unit
- Naval Service Diving Section – Diving unit of the Irish Naval Service
- Naval Special Operations Command – Military unit of the Philippines Navy
- Naval Special Warfare Command (Thailand) – Special operations force within the Military of Thailand
- Naval Submarine Medical Research Laboratory – U.S. Navy research unit for submarine and diving medicine
- Navy diver (disambiguation) – Member of a country's naval forces, specializing in underwater diving
- Navy diver (United States Navy) – US Navy personnel qualified in underwater diving and salvage

=== Ne ===
Section: Top of section, Na, Ne, Ni, No, Nu

- Near miss (safety), also known as close call – Incident that could have caused harm
- Neck dam – Flexible seal between a diving helmet and the diver's neck
- Necker Nymph – DeepFlight Merlin class positively-buoyant open-cockpit 3-seater wet sub
- Nederlandse Onderwatersport Bond (NOB) – Dutch governing body for underwater sports
- Negative buoyancy – A tendency to sink when immersed in a fluid
- Negative buoyancy entry – Scuba diving water entry where the diver will immediately sink
- Negative pressure breathing – Breathing gas which is at a slightly lower pressure than in the resting lung
- Nemo 33 – Indoor recreational diving facility
- Nemrod – Spanish manufacturer of scuba and spearfishing equipment
- Neptune Finswimming Club – Sports club in Bristol, England
- Nereus (underwater vehicle) – Hybrid remotely operated or autonomous underwater vehicle
- Neutral buoyancy – Equilibrium between buoyancy and weight of an immersed object
- Neutral Buoyancy Laboratory – NASA astronaut training facility in Houston, Texas
- Neutral buoyancy pool – Pool of water in which neutral buoyancy is used to train astronauts
- Newtsuit – Atmospheric diving suit designed by Phil Nuytten
- New World Publications – Recreational dive guide publisher

=== Ni ===
Section: Top of section, Na, Ne, Ni, No, Nu

- Night diver – Certification of competence to scuba dive at night
- Night diving – Underwater diving during the hours of darkness
- Nikonos – Brand of 35mm film amphibious cameras
- Nitrogen narcosis – Narcotic effects of respiratory nitrogen
- Nitrous oxide (medication) – Gas used as anesthetic and for pain relief
- Nitrox – Breathing gas, mixture of nitrogen and oxygen
- Nitrox blender – Person competent to blend nitrox for scuba diving
- Nitrox diver – Recreational diving qualification to dive using oxygen enriched air
- Nitrox diving – Underwater diving breathing oxygen enriched air
- Nitrox production – Methods of producing nitrox mixtures

=== No ===
Section: Top of section, Na, Ne, Ni, No, Nu

- NOAA Diving Manual – Training and operations manual for scientific diving
- No-decompression limit (NDL) – Maximum exposure without incurring decompression obligation
- No-decompression stop dive – Underwater dive for which no decompression stop is required
- NOGI Awards – Annual awards by Academy of Underwater Arts and Sciences
- No-limits apnea – Freediving discipline in which the diver descends and ascends using their method of choice
- Nondestructive testing – Type of analysis technique
- Non-freezing cold injury – Tissue injury due to sustained low temperature without freezing
- Nordic Deep – Freediving competition in Lysekil, Sweden
- Normocapnia – Normal arterial carbon dioxide levels
- Normoxic breathing gas – Mixture with similar oxygen content to air
- Normoxic trimix – Breathing gas mixture of helium, nitrogen, and at least 18% oxygen
- Normoxic trimix diver – Recreational technical diving certification level
- No-stop decompression – Ascent from a dive with no obligatory decompression
- No-stop dive – Underwater dive for which no decompression stop is required
- Northern Ireland Federation of Sub-Aqua Clubs – National governing body for recreational diving and underwater sport in Northern Ireland
- Norwegian Diver School – Part of the Western Norway University of Applied Sciences
- No-stop limit – Diving bottom time beyond which obligatory decompression stops are incurred

=== Nu ===
Section: Top of section, Na, Ne, Ni, No, Nu

- Nuclear diving – Diving in an environment where there is a risk of exposure to radioactive materials
- Nuytco Research – Manufacturer of atmospheric diving suits

Contents: Top	0–9	A	B	C	D	E	F	G	H	I	J	K	L	M	N	O	P	Q	R	S	T	U	V	W	X	Y	Z

== See also ==
- Glossary of underwater diving terminology
