= Navy diver =

Navy diver is a general term to describe members of a country's naval forces who specialize in underwater diving and military diving.

- Australia: Royal Australian Navy clearance diver
- Canada: Canadian clearance diver
- Germany: German Navy clearance diver
- Ireland: Naval Service Diving Section (NSDS)
- Norway: Norwegian Navy mine diver command
- United Kingdom: Royal Navy ships diver
- United States: Navy diver (United States Navy)
