= List of military diving units =

This is a list of notable naval frogman and may contain combat swimmer units, salvage units, training units and diving research units which are present or past commands of any branch of the armed forces of any country.

== Algeria ==
- Navy Special Action Regiment (RASM) – Special forces regiment of the Algerian naval forces.

== Argentina ==
- Tactical Divers Group (Buzos Tácticos) is the special operations unit of the Argentine navy. The operatives are combat divers, EOD/demolition technicians, and parachutists.

== Austria ==
- The Jagdkommando (German for Hunter force) is the Austrian Armed Forces' Special Operations group.

== Australia ==
- Clearance Diving Branch is the specialist diving unit of the Royal Australian Navy whose versatile role covers all spheres of military diving
- Special Air Service Regiment is a dedicated special forces unit of the Australian Army that includes undertaking water operations with the emphasis of insertion onto land

== Bangladesh ==
- Special Warfare Diving and Salvage – Bangladesh Navy special operations force
- Para Commando Brigade (Bangladesh) is a unit of the Bangladesh Army which has a frogman commando unit specialized for underwater demolition trained under supervision on Bangladeshi Naval special forces SWADS

== Belgium ==
- Special Forces Group has a specialized diving company for education and training of combat swimmers.

== Brazil ==
- Brazilian Navy Frogmen, Combat Divers - (GRUMEC) the Brazilian SEALS.
- Brazilian Army Combat Divers, 2 branches: Commandos (D/A unit) & Army Special Forces
- Brazilian Army Divers - Engineering and Salvage Divers
- Brazilian Marines - Amphibian Commandos (COMANF)
- Navy Divers - Salvage Divers / Saturation Divers / Non Combatant

== Brunei ==
- Naval Surface Action Group

== Canada ==
- Canadian Armed Forces Divers

== China ==
- 7th Marine Brigade

== Croatia ==
- Croatian Special Operations Battalion (BSD)

== Denmark ==
- Frogman Corps (Denmark) (Danish: Frømandskorpset) is an elite special forces frogman corps in the Royal Danish Navy

== Eritrea ==
- During Eritrea's war of independence against Ethiopia, the rebel forces had a combat frogman force. After the war, some of those frogmen were retrained as dive guides for the scuba diving tourism trade.

== Finland ==
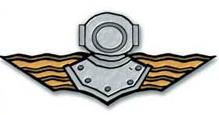
Finnish diver insignia

- The Finnish Navy has trained Finnish combat divers since 1954. Conscripts and career military are eligible to apply for the training. Annually, about 20 conscripts are trained for diving duties. Applying for combat diver training is voluntary, and the selection criteria are stringent. The conscript divers are trained either for anti-mine or for commando operations, while career personnel may also be trained for deep-sea diving duty. All conscript divers receive at least NCO training during their 12-month service period.

== France ==
=== French Navy ===
Commando Hubert, the combat diver unit belonging to Commandos Marine, within FORFUSCO, Force maritime des fusiliers marins et commandos, a section of the French Navy. Minewseeper divers perform sea and land EOD tasks and engineering diving.

=== French Army ===
Each Engineer regiment do have a platoon, called DINOPS of military diver, tasked with engineer missions, reconnaissance and specialized actions in underwater inland environnement, including sewage systems. Special Forces regiments (1st Marine Infantry Paratroopers Regiment and 13th Paratrooper Dragoons Regiment)and Strategic Reconnaissance Regiment (2nd Hussar Regiment) do have underwater operators platoons.

=== Directorate-General for External Security ===
The French foreign intelligence agency has a clandestine combat swimmer unit, called CPEOM ("Paratrooper Training Centre for Maritime Operations").

== Germany ==
- Kommando Spezialkräfte Marine – Commando amphibious warfare force, called the Kampfschwimmer ("Combat Swimmers", abbreviated "KSM").
- Minentaucher Mine clearance divers.

== Greece ==
- Underwater Demolition Command
  - 1953: first Amphibious Reconnaissance Squad is founded.
  - 1957–1968: Underwater Demolition Training School operates in Kannelopoulos training center.
  - 1968: Underwater Demolition Team Division established in Skaramanga.
  - 1969: UDT Division renamed to Underwater Demolition Unit.
  - 2002: Underwater Demolition Unit renamed to Underwater Demolition Command.

== India ==
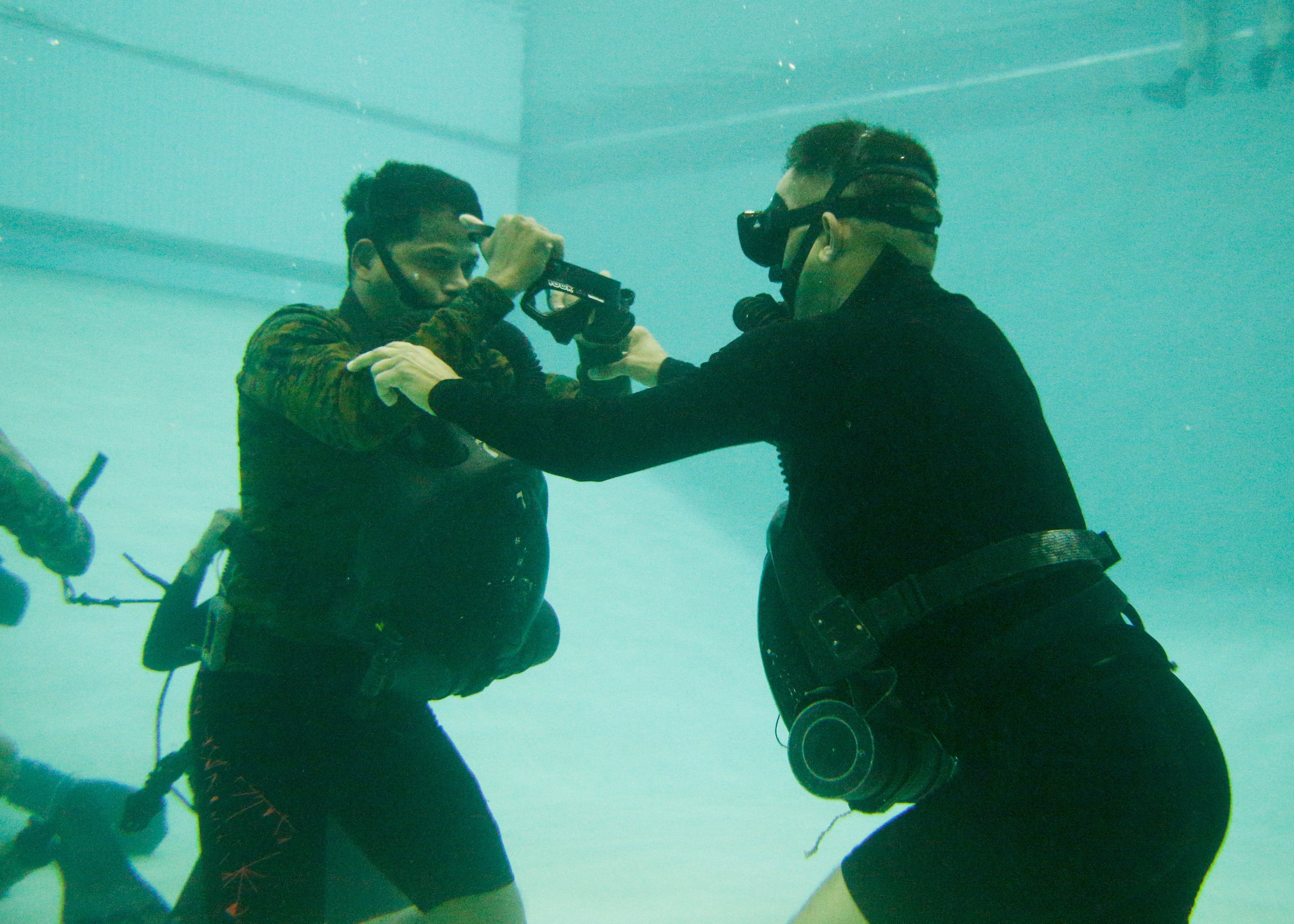
Green berets and PARA SF training together.

- MARCOS – The MCF is the elite naval special operations unit of the Indian Navy that undertakes Amphibious reconnaissance, Amphibious warfare, underwater demolition.
- Para (Special Forces) - Some commandos of the elite Parachute Regiment (India) special forces of the Indian Army are trained combat divers.
- NSG (National security guards) - operatives of Special action group of NSG are from the special forces of the Indian armed forces on deputation, some commandos of the unit are combat diving qualified.

== Indonesia ==
- KOPASKA is the main underwater combat, Frogman, Special forces unit of the Indonesian Navy.

== Iran ==
Nedsa

== Ireland ==
- Naval Service Diving Section (NSDS)
- Army Ranger Wing (ARW) Combat Diving Section

== Israel ==
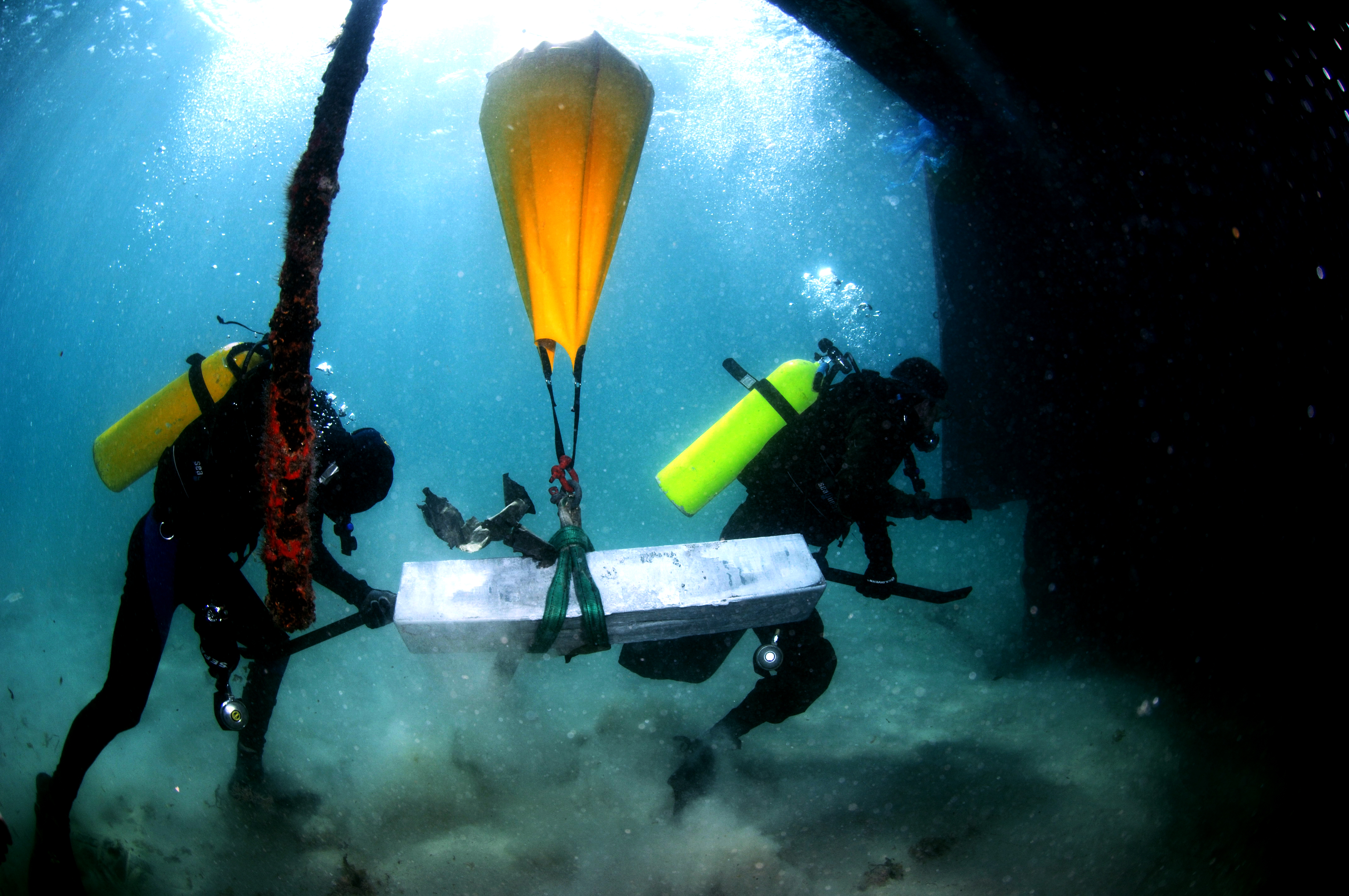
Israeli frogmen transfer equipment using lifting-bags

- Shayetet 13 is the elite naval commando frogmen unit of the Israeli Navy. The unit is considered one of the primary Special Forces units of the Israel Defense Forces and is one of the most secretive. The details of many missions and identities of active operatives are highly classified.

== Italy ==
- Gruppo Operativo Subacquei

== Japan ==
- Western Army Infantry Regiment (WAIR)
- Special Boarding Unit (SBU)

== Korea (Republic of Korea/"South Korea") ==
- Republic of Korea Navy UDT/SEAL
- Republic of Korea Navy Sea Salvage & Rescue Unit (SSU)
- Republic of Korea Marine Corps Reconnaissance
- Republic of Korea Army Special Warfare Command (Special forces)

== Lebanon ==
- Lebanese Navy SEALs Regiment is an elite marine commando frogmen unit of the Lebanese Navy. The unit are responsible for underwater demolition, conducting joint operations with the navy, land and air forces and maritime counter terrorism. The unit was established with assistance from the United States Navy SEALs and British Royal Marines.

== Libya ==
- Libyan Naval Special Forces – Special operations forces of the Libyan Navy.

== Malaysia ==
- PASKAL – Naval special force of Malaysian Armed Forces.
- Naval Diving and Mine Warfare Headquarters – New Command for the elite Royal Malaysian Navy (RMN) divers. The same task once belongs to KD Duyong which now functioning as full-time diving school.
- Grup Gerak Khas – Malaysian Army special force, there is Combat Swimmer Course as an advance training option for the members of GGK.
- PASKAU - Special force of Malaysian Air Force.
- Special Task And Rescue - Special force of Malaysian Coast Guard.

== Mexico ==
- Fuerzas Especiales

== Namibia ==
- Namibian Marine Corps Operational Diving Team

== Netherlands ==
- Korps Commandotroepen (KCT), (Riverine Operations Teams (OWG)), special forces of the Royal Netherlands Army.
- Netherlands Maritime Special Operations Forces (NLMARSOF) (Special Forces Underwater Operators), special forces of the Royal Netherlands Marine Corps.
- Constructieduikerspeloton is the Army Engineers unit specialized in supporting Rivier Crossing Operations and executing heavy underwater construction operations. They are incorporated in 105 bridging company.
- Engineer combat divers of 11 airmobile engineer company. Operations include reconnaissance, demolition, and other.
- Beach Recce Teams of Surface Assault and Training Group of the Royal Netherlands Marine Corps.
- Defensie Duikgroep (Defense Diving Group) of the Royal Netherlands Navy. Organized into the Very-Shallow-Water-Diveteam (Supports amphibious operations of the Royal Netherlands Marine Corps by clearing beaches), the Deep Diving Team (Specializes in deep diving, clearing mines, rescues of crews of submerged submarines), and the Salvage & Construction team (Specializes in subsurface repair of ships, underwater construction, and harbor inspection).
- Explosieven Opruimingsdienst Defensie (EODD) (Explosive Ordnance Disposal Service Defense). All members of the Maritime Company must be Clearance Diver trained before being allowed to serve in the EODD.

== New Zealand ==
- Navy Clearance Diving Group (CDG) formally known as the Operational Diving Team (ODT) is a clearance diving unit. Its focus is on hydrographic survey and Mine Countermeasures Operations, Dive Training support is supplied to Fiji, Tonga, and Samoa.
- The New Zealand Special Air Service also has divers in its boat troops (the NZSAS has two Sabre Squadrons), with particular emphasis on insertion.

== Norway ==
- Norway's commando frogmen corps is called Marinejegerkommandoen, "Navy Seals command", which is something like the British SBS.
- Norway has a clearance diver group called Minedykkerkommandoen, "Norwegian Navy EOD Command".

== Pakistan ==
- Army Special Service Group (SSG) has a "Moses Company" that is uniquely modeled on the United States Army Special Forces, they mainly operate on inland rivers and waterfield in the five rivers of Punjab, Pakistan.
- Navy Special Services Group (SSGN) is also uniquely modeled on United States Navy SEALs entirely and is assigned to unconventional warfare operations in the coastal regions. During war, it is assigned to Midget submarines as Diver propulsion vehicle. All other training is similar to the Army SSG with specific marine orientation provided at its headquarters.

== Philippines ==
- Naval Special Operations Command

== Poland ==
Three Polish military units train and deploy frogmen in military operations. Most known are:

- JW Formoza
- JW Grom water operations detachment
- JW Komandosów's frogmen company.

Polish frogmen SF uses e.g. R.C.H OXY-NG2, Aqua Lung Amphora closed-circuit apparatus.

== Portugal ==
- Sappers Divers Group (Agrupamento de Mergulhadores)
- Special Actions Detachment (Destacamento de Ações Especiais)

== Romania ==
- Battle divers - Naval Group of Special Operations Forces (GNFOS)
- Naval Diving Center - Romanian Naval Forces

== Russia ==
- Russian commando frogmen
- Special Operations Forces
- Diver Units in different SpetsNaz Brigades and Naval Infantry Separate Reconnaissance Battalions.

== Serbia ==
- 82nd River Underwater Demolition Company of the 72nd Brigade for Special Operations
- 93rd Diving Company of the River Flotilla

== Singapore ==
- Special Operations Force (SOF)
- Naval Diving Unit (NDU)

== Sri Lanka ==
- LRRP
- Regiment Special Force (RSF)
- Special Forces Regiment (SF)
- Special Boat Squadron (SBS)
- Sri Lankan Navy Divers

== South Africa ==
- Operational Diving Division (SA Navy), based in Simon's Town.
- South African Special Forces.

== Spain ==
Spain has been training combat divers and swimmers since 1967. Two units in the Spanish Navy currently operate under a Naval Special Warfare mandate:

- UOE (Special Operations Unit) – All aspects of maritime special operations at sea, on land, and by air.
- UEBC (Special Combat Diver Unit) – Mainly hydrographic surveys, underwater demolitions and special reconnaissance.

Nowadays both units were unified into the Naval Special Warfare Unit (FGNE), which covers all maritime special operations such as underwater demolitions, underwater infiltration techniques, maritime interdiction operations, direct action, military assistance, special reconnaissance, hydrographic surveys, parachuting into water (helocast, craftcast...), etc.

== Sweden ==
- Swedish Amphibious Corps:
  - The Reconnaissance Platoon, also referred to colloquially as the Attack Divers (A-dyk). They conduct long-range reconnaissance missions behind enemy lines, sabotage, clearing beach obstacles, hydrographic surveys, and although combat is not their priority, they have a limited ability to conduct direct action missions such as ambushes. Between 6 and 10 are trained each year. The Reconnaissance Platoon is a commando unit, belonging to the amphibious battalion of the Swedish Amphibious Corps. They offer one of the hardest and most demanding training regimens in the Swedish armed forces.
  - Navy EOD-divers (Röjdyk)
  - Army divers (FArb-dykare) Underwater welding, obstacle clearance, underwater demolition and repairs. Belongs to the engineer troops.
  - Amphibious divers (Amfibiedyk) of the amphibious battalion. Underwater obstacle clearance, repairs and EOD on land.

== Taiwan/Republic of China ==
- Republic of China Marine Corps Command
  - Amphibious Reconnaissance and Patrol Unit
- Republic of China Navy
  - Underwater Demolition Team (U.D.T) was withdraw from the R.O.C Navy in 2005 and was adapted to the ROC Marines Corps Amphibious Reconnaissance and Patrol Group
- Republic of China Army General Headquarters
  - Aviation and Special Forces Command
    - 101st Amphibious Reconnaissance Battalion (better known as Sea Dragon Frogman, has a company station in Kinmen, Matsu, 3 in Penghu, and other frontline islands)

== Thailand ==
- Royal Thai Army (RTA)
  - 3rd Special Forces Regiment King's Guard (Airborne)
  - 21st Infantry Regiment, Queen Sirikit's Guard
  - Long Range Reconnaissance Patrols Company (LRRP)
- Royal Thai Navy (RTN)
  - Royal Thai Navy Diver & EOD
  - Royal Thai Navy SEALs
  - RTMC Reconnaissance Battalion (RECON)
- Royal Thai Air Force (RTAF)
  - Special Operations Regiment (SOR)

== Tunisia ==
- Special Forces Group (Tunisia) (GFS)
  - 51st Marine Commando Regiment (51st RCM)

== Turkiye ==
- Underwater Offence (Turkish Armed Forces), also known as Su Altı Taaruz – Special operations Forces of the Turkish Navy
- Special Forces Command (Turkey), also known as Özel Kuvvetler Komutanlığı (OKK) – Turkish special forces group
- Gendarmerie Special Public Security Command

== Ukraine ==
- Ukrainian SOF
  - 73rd Maritime Special Operations Centre
- Ukrainian Navy
  - 801st Center for Combat against Underwater Incursion Forces and Devices and Mine Disposal

== United Kingdom ==
- Special Boat Service is the Navy Service special forces unit
  - British commando frogmen
- Royal Navy Northern and Southern Fleet Diving Groups and Fleet Diving Units 1, 2 and 3 are the clearance diving units specialising in various types of equipment and operations.
- Special Air Service Boat Troop is the Army special forces unit that undertakes water operations (emphasis of insertion onto land)
- Royal Engineers: the corps has had army divers for over 170 years. Training was held at Marchwood in Hampshire until moving to HMS Gunwharf in Portsmouth in the early 1980s. Now a combination of Royal Engineers and Royal Navy all train at a special diving school at Horsea Island in Hampshire. The roles of the Royal Engineer Divers are probably the most diverse of all including construction, demolition, reconnaissance, search, recovery and sewer searches. Unlike naval divers who dive both mixed gas sets and air sets, RE divers only specialise in Air diving.
- Royal logistic Corps Divers as part of 17 Port and Maritime Regiment

== United States ==
- United States Navy (USN)
  - Navy diver
  - Navy Experimental Diving Unit (NEDU)
  - Underwater Construction Teams (UCT)
  - Navy Explosive Ordnance Disposal (EOD)
  - Special Amphibious Reconnaissance Corpsman (SARC)
  - United States Naval Special Warfare Command (USNSWC)
    - Special warfare combatant-craft crewmen (SWCC)
    - United States Navy SEALs (Navy SEALs)
- United States Coast Guard (USCG)
  - Deployable Specialized Forces (DSF)
    - Coast Guard diver
    - Regional Dive Locker Teams
    - Maritime Security Response Team (MSRT)
    - Maritime Safety and Security Team (MSST)
- United States Marine Corps (USMC)
  - Maritime Special Purpose Force (MSPF)
  - United States Marine Corps Force Reconnaissance (FORECON)
  - United States Marine Corps Reconnaissance Battalions (Marine Division Recon)
  - United States Marine Forces Special Operations Command (MARSOC)
    - Marine Raider Regiment (MRR)
- United States Army (USA)
  - United States Army Corps of Engineers (USACE)
    - Army engineer diver
  - United States Army Special Operations Command (Airborne) (USASOC)
    - 1st Special Forces Command (Airborne)
      - United States Army Special Forces (Green Berets)
    - Army Rangers
    - Delta Force
- United States Air Force (USAF)
  - Air Force Special Operations Command (AFSOC)
    - 24th Special Tactics Squadron (24th STS)
    - United States Air Force Combat Control Team (CCT)
    - United States Air Force Pararescue (PJs)
    - United States Air Force Tactical Air Control Party (TACP)
    - United States Air Force Special Reconnaissance (SR)

== See also ==
- Clearance diver – Navy diver specialised in explosives
- United States military divers – Underwater divers employed by the US armed forces
