= Naval Special Deployment Force (Germany) =

- Spezialisierten Einsatzkräfte Marine
- Active: 1997 – 31 March 2014
- Country: Germany
- Branch: German Navy
- Type: Naval infantry
- Garrison/HQ: Eckernförde, Schleswig-Holstein

Commanders
- Current commander: Jörg Buddenbohm

The Naval Special Deployment Force (German: Spezialisierten Einsatzkräfte Marine) (SEK M) was a battalion-sized infantry formation of the German Navy, which was stationed in Eckernförde. They were part of the 1st Flotilla (Einsatzflottille 1).

The battalion included the Kampfschwimmerkompanie (German commando frogmen), the Minentaucher kompanie and a boarding-company.

The battalion was set up in 1997 and dissolved on 31 March 2014. Their tasks are continued by the Naval Force Protection Battalion and the Kommando Spezialkräfte Marine.
