= Royal Navy ships diver =

Category of underwater diver in the Royal Navy

Ship's diver was a diving qualification in the Royal Navy. Personnel of this rank would be stationed aboard ships to assist repairs, recover resources and property from shallow water, and perform rescue missions on those trapped underwater.

== Qualification ==
The qualification and selection process for Royal Navy ship Divers is, as of 2005:

One must be selected by passing their own nation's Divers selection test and have completed certification in a separate Diving Course or Fit to Dive certificate. They must pass a physical fitness test that consists of completing a 1.5 mile (2.4 km) run in 10 mins 30 seconds, as well as 8 chin-ups, 16 dips and 40 sit-ups consecutively without a break. Recruits must be a minimum of 19 years of age.

== Aircrew divers ==
Later in their careers, some Ship's Divers undertake further training in order to qualify as Search and Rescue Helicopter crew. As well as general SAR duties they are also trained to jump from Helicopters in order to rescue aircrew of fixed wing aircraft should it ditch on takeoff from an Aircraft Carrier.

== Current Status ==
Ships' Divers were to disappear entirely from the Royal Navy in 2006, to be replaced by clearance diving teams that now accompany deployment groups. All Ships Diver training stopped on 1 October 2005.
