= Röjdykare =

Clearance divers of the Swedish Navy

Navy EOD Division
- Röjdykarna
- Active: 1952–present
- Country: Sweden
- Branch: Swedish Navy
- Type: Navy EOD
- Role: Explosive ordnance disposal Improvised explosive device disposal Amphibious warfare
- Part of: Swedish Navy
- Garrison/HQ: Skredsvik
- Engagements: Operation Atalanta

The Swedish Navy EOD (Swedish: Röjdykarna) are the clearance divers of the Swedish Navy. They are tasked with conducting with underwater Explosive Ordnance Disposal (EOD) as well as EOD operations on land. The training is very physically and mentally challenging which is why meticulous tests are done before selection.

== History ==
In 1953, then lieutenants Rolf Hamilton and Gösta Fahlman underwent a special course of light diving for commando at the United States Navy Underwater Demolition Team (UDT), the precursor to the United States Navy SEALs, in San Diego, US. After completing the education in the United States, captain Rolf Hamilton became head of the first explosive ordnance disposal course Gullmars Base in Skredsvik, Uddevalla Municipality in 1954. From 1956 and a number of years ahead, combat divers were also trained in Skredsvik. Later the training was concentrated to include only clearance divers.

== Selection ==
The selection can be divided into two steps:

1. Selection test at the Recruitment Authority. The test includes, among other things, theoretical tests aimed at measuring general talent/intelligence, medical examinations such as vision and hearing examinations, physical exams with the purpose of examining the oxygen uptake ability (fitness), strength tests and psychological interviews.

Those who meet the basic requirements for röjdykare can apply for the second step of selection.

2. Complementary tests (KP). Those who fulfill the basic requirements of the selection test are called for a complementary testing. The tests are conducted during four days in Karlskrona. During the KP, physical tests such as running tests are carried out, including three km, strength tests in the form of chins, dips, situps, deadlifts, pushups, back extensions and various water exercises (underwater physical training) such as diving, somersaults, underwater swimming, treading water etc. These water exercises are performed at a high intensity over a long period of time. Thorough medical examinations are also conducted to make sure that the prospective divers can cope with the service as a diver. In addition to this, there are interviews with officers from the röjdykar-division.

KP Röjdyk is very physically challenging and places high demands on both physical performance and motivation. Only 20% of those who come to the KP remain on day 4. The main reasons why a certain proportion of the test takers fail the tests are lack of motivation and poor preparation.

== Activities ==
Personnel from the unit continuously participate in domestic EOD operations as well as providing support to Swedish and allied forces during operations abroad. Personnel from the Navy EOD Division have participated in Operation Atalanta, integrating with the Swedish Marine Boarding team. They have also done several deployments in Afghanistan as well as in Mali, embedding with line units to provide counter-IED support.

== See also ==
- Norway – Norwegian Naval EOD Command
- United States – US Navy EOD
- Australia – Clearance Diving Branch
