= List of Divers Alert Network publications =

Divers Alert Network (DAN) is a group of not-for-profit organisations dedicated to improving diving safety for all divers. It was founded in Durham, North Carolina, in 1980 at Duke University to provide 24/7 telephone diving medical assistance. Since then the organisation has expanded globally and now has independent regional organisations in North America, Europe, Japan, Asia-Pacific and Southern Africa.

DAN publishes research results on a wide range of matters relating to diving safety and medicine and diving accident analysis, including annual reports on decompression illness and diving fatalities. Most are freely available on the internet, many of these were at the now defunct Rubicon Research Repository.

This list includes publications where one or more authors are staff or members of one of the DAN affiliates, where a large part of the data is from one of the DAN Databases, or where the research was funded by DAN.

== Alert Diver ==
DAN publishes a periodical for members in print and online. Alert Diver is currently published quarterly. Back issues are often available on the DAN website.

== Annual reports on decompression illness and diving fatalities ==
- Dovenbarger, JA (1988); Report on Decompression Illness and Diving Fatalities (based on data collected in 1987).
- Dovenbarger, JA (1989); Report on Decompression Illness and Diving Fatalities (based on data collected in 1988).
- Dovenbarger, JA (1991); Report on Decompression Illness and Diving Fatalities (based on data collected in 1989).
- Dovenbarger, JA (1992); Report on Decompression Illness and Diving Fatalities (based on data collected in 1990). Also includes: Flying After Diving data from 1987 to 1990, Fatality Investigation Protocol, Autopsy Protocol, and occupational fatality data.
- Dovenbarger, JA; Uguccioni, DM (1993) Report on Decompression Illness and Diving Fatalities (based on data collected in 1991). Also includes: Fatality Investigation Protocol, Autopsy Protocol, and occupational fatality data.
- Dovenbarger, JA; Uguccioni, DM (1994); Report on Decompression Illness and Diving Fatalities (based on data collected in 1992). Also includes: Fatality Investigation and Autopsy Protocol.
- Dovenbarger, JA; Uguccioni, DM (1995); Report on Decompression Illness and Diving Fatalities (based on data collected in 1993).
- Dovenbarger, JA; Uguccioni, DM (1996); Report on Decompression Illness and Diving Fatalities (based on data collected in 1994).
- Dovenbarger, JA; Uguccioni, DM (1997); Report on Decompression Illness and Diving Fatalities (based on data collected in 1995).
- Dovenbarger, JA; Uguccioni, DM (1998); Report on Decompression Illness and Diving Fatalities (based on data collected in 1996).
- Dovenbarger, JA; Uguccioni, DM (1999); Report on Decompression Illness and Diving Fatalities (based on data collected in 1997).
- Dovenbarger, JA; Uguccioni, DM; Vann, RD (2000); Report on Decompression Illness and Diving Fatalities (based on data collected in 1998).
- Vann, RD; Uguccioni, DM (2001) Report on Decompression Illness, Diving Fatalities, and Project Dive Exploration (based on data collected in 1999).
- Vann, RD; Uguccioni, DM (2002); Report on Decompression Illness, Diving Fatalities, and Project Dive Exploration (based on data collected in 2000).
- Vann, RD; Uguccioni, DM (2003); Report on Decompression Illness, Diving Fatalities, and Project Dive Exploration (based on data collected in 2001).
- Vann, RD; Uguccioni, DM (2004); Report on Decompression Illness, Diving Fatalities, and Project Dive Exploration (based on data collected in 2002).
- Vann, RD; Uguccioni, DM (2005) Report on Decompression Illness, Diving Fatalities, and Project Dive Exploration (based on data collected in 2003).
- Vann, RD; Uguccioni, DM (2006); Report on Decompression Illness, Diving Fatalities, and Project Dive Exploration (based on data collected in 2004).
- Buzzacott, P; Trout, BM; Caruso, JL; Nelson, C; Denoble, PJ; Nord, DA; Chimiak, J; Martina, SD; Nochetto, M; Pollock, NW; Lippmann, J; Lawrence, C; Fock, A; Wodak, T; Jamieson, S; Harris, R; Walker, D; Kojima, Y (2015). Buzzacott, P (ed.). A report on 2010-2013 data on diving fatalities, injuries, and incidents.
- Buzzacott, P, ed. (2016). A report on 2014 data on diving fatalities, injuries, and incidents.
- Buzzacott, Peter; Moore, Jeanette P.; Bennett, Caslyn M.; Caruso, James L.; Nelson, Craig; Denoble, Petar J. (2017). A Report on 2015 Diving Fatalities, Injuries, and Incidents.
- Buzzacott, Peter; Moore, Jeanette P.; Bennett, Caslyn M.; Caruso, James L.; Nelson, Craig; Denoble, Petar J. (2018). A Report on 2016 Diving Fatalities, Injuries, and Incidents.

== Other publications ==
=== 1985 ===
- Wacholz, CJ; Bloch, K; Mebane, GY; Goad, R; Moon, RE; Piantadosi, CA; Camporesi, EM; Linaweaver Jr, PG; Kindwall, EP; Van Meter, KW; Myers, RAM; Bennett, PB (1985); Review and analysis of DAN accident cases 1981–1984.

=== 1988 ===
- Kindwall, EP; Goldmann, RW; Thombs, PA (1988); Use of the Monoplace vs. Multiplace Chamber in the Treatment of Diving Diseases.

=== 1989 ===
- Heinmiller, PA (1989); ORCA's new Delphi computers: Impact on the diving community.
- Sheffield, PJ (1989); Flying after Diving.
- Wachholz, CJ; Bensen, CV; Vann, RD (1989); Estimating risk in multi-level sport diving.
- Wachholtz, CJ; Dovenbarger, JA; Bond, BG; Bennett, PB (1989); Altitude exposure in decompression sickness reported to the Divers Alert Network.
- Wachholtz, CJ; Dovenbarger, JA; Fowler III, GP; Rust, JS; Thompson, LD (1989); Comparison of accident data vs. survey data of uninjured divers of DAN membership June 1988.

=== 1990 ===
- Bennett, PB; Dovenbarger, J; Corson, K; Dunford, R; Myers, RAM; Van Meter, K; Goldman, R; Linaweaver, P; Moon, RE (1990); DAN analysis of recreational diving accidents for 1988.
- Bennett, PB; Dovenbarger, JA; Wachholz, CJ; Corson, KS (1990); DAN analysis of recreational dive accidents for 1988.
- Bennett, PB; Moon, RE (1990); Diving Accident Management.
- Bond, JG; Dovenbarger, JA; Bong, BG (1990); A descriptive analysis of existing medical conditions in a population of recreational scuba divers in the United States.
- Bond, JG; Moon, RE; Dovenbarger, JA; Morris, DL (1990); A descriptive comparison of the initial recompression treatment of recreational scuba diving related injuries.
- Dovenbarger, J; Corson, K; Mebane, GY; Bennett, PB; Wachholz, C (1990); DAN analysis of diving fatalities using compressed gas on 1989
- Thombs, PA; Foley, B (1990); A practical approach to the physical screening of new recreational divers.

=== 1991 ===
- Corson, KS; Dovenbarger, JA; Moon, RE; Hodder, S; Bennett, PB (1991); Risk assessment of asthma for decompression illness.
- Dunford, RG; Wachholz, C; Fabus, S; Huggins, C; Mitchell, P; Bennett, PB (1991); Doppler analysis of sport diver profiles.
- Lang, MA; Vann, RD (1991); Proceedings of the AAUS Repetitive Diving Workshop.
- Wachholz, CJ; Dunford, R; Bennett, PB (1991); Ultrasonic doppler measurements of sports divers at altitude.

=== 1992 ===
- Dear, GdeL; Corson, K; Dovenbarger, JA; Moon, RE; Bennett, PB (1992); Predictors of long term neurological sequelae in recreational divers.

=== 1993 ===
- Dear, GdeL; Denoble, PA; Vann, RD (1993); Manifestation of decompression illness in divers using dive computers.
- Mebane, GY; Lew, N; Dovenbarger, J (1993); Review of autopsies on recreational scuba divers, 1989–1992.

=== 1994 ===
- Dear, GdeL; Dovenbarger, JA; Corson, KS; Stolp, BW; Moon, RE (1994); Diabetes among recreational divers.
- Vann, RD; Gerth, WA; Corson, KS; Denoble, PJ (1994); DCS and preflight surface intervals after dry, resting dives to 60fsw.

=== 1995 ===
- Corry, JA (1995); The role of field-administered oxygen in dive accident management.
- Dovenbarger, JA; Wacholtz, C; Bennett, PB (1995): Divers Alert Network, DAN accident data.
- Vann, RD; DeNoble, PJ; Sitzes, CR; Harbaugh, KE; Gerth, WA; Pollard, GW; Charlton Jr, WH (1995); Project Dive Safety and scientific diving.
- Des Gorman (1995); Safe Limits: A International Dive Symposium. Contents: Diving in Australia - Terry Cummins; An occupational medicine view point - David Smith; Divers Alert Network, DAN accident data - Chris Wachholz; Diving incidents: errors divers make - Christopher Acott; An assessment of risk for recreational dive instructors at work - Drew Richardson; A retrospective study of decompression illness in recreational scuba divers and scuba instructors in Queensland - Ariel Marks and Tom Fallowfield; Post diving altitude exposure - Ian Millar; Western Australia pearl divers' mode of diving - Robert Wong; Safe Limits: assessing the risks - Harry Oxer; Excellent safely record despite the risks - Rod Punshon; Multi-Day Diving: the Experience of the Hyperbaric Medicine Unit, Royal Adelaide Hospital - Steve Goble and Lindsay Barker; Staged decompression following no-decompression diving - Geoff Gordon; Several case studies from General Practice - Peter Chapman-Smith; Dive accident management - Tony Hochberg; A Case for Safety - Phil Percival.

=== 1996 ===
- Caruso, JL; Uguccioni, DM; Mebane, GY; Dovenbarger, JA (1996); Recreational diving fatalities in the United States, 1990-1994: Pattern and trends.
- Elliott, DH (1996); Are Asthmatics fit to Dive?
- Gerth, WA; Vann, RD (1996); A statistical bubble dynamics model of decompression sickness risk for diving and altitude decompressions.
- Lawler, WL; Hargasser, S; Moon, RE; Uguccioni, DM; Stolp, BW (1996); Two-year followup of decompression illness (DCI)
- Uguccioni, DM; Moon, RE; Dovenbarger, JA; Stolp, BW; Dear, GdeL; Bennett, PB (1996); Misclassification of decompression illness (DCI).
- Vann, RD; Bute, BP; Uguccioni, DM; Smith, LR (1996); Repetitive recompression in DCI therapy.
- Vann, RD; Gerth, WA; DeNoble, PJ; Sitzes, CR; Smith, LR, (1996); A comparison of recent flying after diving experiments with published flying after diving guidelines.
- Moon, RE; Sheffield, PJ (1996); Treatment of Decompression Illness. Session I Clinical findings in decompression illness: a proposed terminology - A. J. Dutka; Histology of decompression illness - I. M. Hardman; Discussion; Session 2 Altitude decompression sickness - A. A. Pilmanis; Treatment of altitude decompression sickness - P. N Kimbrell; Decompression sickness in space: manifestations and treatment - M. R. Powell; Discussion; Session 3 Principles of U.S. Navy recompression treatments for decompression sickness - E. D. Thalmann; The treatment of arterial gas embolism - D. F Gorman; Discussion; Session 4 Deep treatments and Hawaiian experience - R. K. Overlock, K. A. Tolsma, C. W Turner, and N Bugelli; Use of short versus long tables in the treatment of decompression sickness and air embolism - E. P. Kindwall; Serious decompression injury: pharmacologic aids to treatment - A. J. Dutka; Discussion; Session 5 Neurological imaging in patients with decompression illness - M. W Hanson and L. K. Jordan III; The use of psychometric testing in decompression illness - M. D. Curley and T. L. Amerson; Inner ear decompression sickness versus inner ear barotrauma: differential diagnosis and treatment of diving related inner ear dysfunction - J. C. Farmer; Discussion; Session 6 The treatment of divers in the North Sea - D. H. Elliott; Treatment of decompression illness (DCI) and arterial gas embolism (AGE): U.S. experience New Orleans practice protocols for DCI and AGE - K. VanMeter; Discussion; Session 7 Flow-chart for the treatment of decompression illness Hans Ornhagen; Underwater oxygen treatment of DCS - C. Edmonds; Late treatment of decompression illness and use of SPECT brain imaging - P. G. Harch; Saturation treatment of decompression illness in a hospital based hyperbaric facility - P. Davis, C. A. Piantadosi, and R. E. Moon; Discussion; Session 8 Effect of different breathing gasses on bubble resolution in lipid and aqueous tissues. Animal experiments - O. Hyldegaard and J. Madsen; He-02 treatment for severe air diving-induced neurological decompression illness - A. Shupak; Discussion; Session 9 Prognostic factors in DCI in recreational divers - R. D. Vann, B. P. Bute, D. M. Uguccioni and L. R. Smith; Association of CNS hemorrhage with failure to respond to recompression treatment - implications for management of refractory cases of decompression illness - J. R. Broome; Principles of resuscitation in CNS injury and future directions - D. S. Warner; Evolution and performances of Comex treatment tables - J. P. Imbert; Discussion;

=== 1997 ===
- Caruso, JL; Uguccioni, DM; Dovenbarger, JA; Bennett, PB (1997); Fatalities related to cardiovascular disease in the recreational diving population.
- Dear, GdeL; Vann, RD; Pieper, CF; Bute, BP; Uguccioni, DM; Thalmann, ED (1997); DCI symptoms do not appear to form syndromes.
- Doyle, K; Baek, PS; De Long, ER; Uguccioni, DM; Dear, GdeL; Stolp, BW; Dovenbarger, JA; Moon, RE (1997); Menstruation as a risk factor for decompression illness (DCI) in female scuba divers taking oral contraceptives (OC).
- Gerth, WA; Vann, RD (1997); A probabilistic gas and bubble dynamics model provides improved estimates of dcs risk during oxygen decompression from air dives.
- Vann, RD; Dear, GdeL; Pieper, CF; Bute, BP; Uguccioni, DM; Thalmann, ED (1997); Correlation of DCI signs and symptoms with classical diagnosis.
- Yamami, N; Mano, Y; Shibayama, M; Kawashima, M; Nakayama, H; Takahashi, M; Nakayama, T; Mizuno, T (1997); A 5-year survey of emergency calls to the Divers Alert Network in Japan.

=== 1998 ===
- Caruso, JL; Hobgood, JA; Uguccioni, DM; Bennett, PB (1998); Inexperience kills: The relationship between lack of diving experience and fatal diving mishaps.
- Caruso, JL; Hobgood, JA; Uguccioni, DM; Dovenbarger, JA (1998); Carbon monoxide poisoning in recreational diving: An uncommon but potentially fatal problem.
- DeNoble, PJ; Bute, BP; Uguccioni, DM; Sitzes, CR; Vann, RD; Bennett, PB (1998); Ascent rates in recreational scuba dives recorded in Project Dive Exploration.
- Uguccioni, DM; Dovenbarger, JA; Hobgood, JA; Moon, RE (1998); Commercial airflight after recompression therapy for decompression illness.

=== 1999 ===
- Caruso, JL; Uguccioni, DM; Dovenbarger, JA; Bennett, PB (1999); Fatalities involving divers making technical dives: 1988–1997.
- Dear, GdeL; Uguccioni, DM; Dovenbarger, JA; Thalmann, ED; Hanson, E; Cudahy, EA (1999); Estimated DCI incidence in a select group of recreational divers.
- Dueker, CW; Brown, SD (1999); Near Drowning Workshop.
- Dunford, RG; Leigh, BC; DeNoble, PJ; Uguccioni, DM; Vann, RD (1999); Dive accident input using scanning technology.
- Hanson, E; Fleisher, J; Jackman, RP; Uguccioni, DM; Thalmann, ED; Cudahy, EA (1999); Demographics and illness prevalence in a recreational scuba diver population: fitness to dive.
- Kay, E; Spencer, MP (1999); In Water Recompression (workshop). Contents: Opening remarks - MP Spencer and E Kay; Australian underwater oxygen treatment of DCS - C Edmonds; Treatment of decompression sickness - FP Farm, E Hayashi, and EL Beckman; In-water recompression: USN and NOAA methods - JM Chimiak; Efficacy of immediate in-water recompression in the treatment ofcentral nervous system decompression sickness - JM Hardman, LA Smith, and EL Beckman; Body heat loss under water and thermal protection - P Webb; Discussion, Moderator - RW Hamilton; Oxygen toxicity during in-water recompression - ED Thalmann; Discussion, Moderator - CE Fife; Keeping up with the times: application of technical diving practices for in-water recompression - RL Pyle; Discussion, Moderator - CE Fife; In-water recompression: a viewpoint - RE Moon and ED Thalmann; Introduction to the final panel discussion - RK Overlock; Discussion, Moderator - CE Fife.
- Vann, RD; Winkler, P; Sitzes, CR; Uguccioni, DM; DeNoble, PJ (1999); The 1999 Project Dive Exploration pilot study.
- Wacholtz, CJ; Uguccioni, DM; Dear, GdeL; Vann, RD; Bennett, PB (1999); Guidelines needed for management of mild DCI in remote locations.

=== 2000 ===
- Buch, DA; Dovenbarger, JA; Uguccioni, DM; EI-Moalem, H; Moon, RE (2000); Effect of cigarette smoking on the severity of decompression illness (DCI) symptoms.
- Caruso, JL; Uguccioni, DM; Ellis, JE; Dovenbarger, JA; Vann, RD; Bennett, PB (2000); Ten years of diving fatality epidemiology: The Divers Alert Network database, 1989–1998.
- Denoble, PJ; Vann, RD; Gerth, WA (2000); Reported and estimated decompression sickness in recreational diving.
- Dovenbarger, JA; Uguccioni, DM; Sullivan, KM; deL Dear, G; Moon, RE (2000); Paralysis in 69 recreational scuba injuries.
- Lang, MA (2000); DAN Nitrox Workshop Proceedings.
- Massey, EW; Dovenbarger, JA; Nord, DA; de L Dear, G; Moon, RE (2000); Seizures in divers.
- Sugiyama, H; Mano, K; Hayano, M; Onda, M (2000); Coastal scuba diving accidents in Japan: Preliminary report.
- Uguccioni, DM; Denoble, PD; Vann, RD (2000); Recreational diving injuries, 1987-1997: A review.
- Yamami, N; Mano, Y; Shibayama, M; Takahashi, M; Kawashima, M; Hirabayashi, K (2000); Driving to altitude after diving and decompression sickness.
- Uguccioni, DM; Dear, GdeL; Dovenbarger, JA; Feinglos, M; Moon, RE; Pollock, NW (2000); Plasma glucose response to recreational diving in insulin-requiring diabetics and controls.

=== 2001 ===
- Caruso, JL; Bove, AA; Uguccioni, DM; Ellis, JE; Dovenbarger, JA; Bennett, PB (2001); Recreational diving deaths associated with cardiovascular disease: Epidemiology and recommendations for pr-participation screening.
- Taylor, L; Mitchell, SJ (2001); Diabetes as a contraindication to diving: Should old dogma give way to new evidence?
- Vann, RD; DeNoble, PJ; Uguccioni, DM; Freiberger, JJ (2001); Nitrox diving.
- Wacholtz, CJ; Terjung, HC; Freiberger, JJ; Bennett, PB (2001); Time required to organize and effect air ambulance transport in 99 DCI cases referred to DAN travel assist.
- Yamami, N; Mano, Y; Shibayama, M; Nakayama, H; Togawa, S; Kawashima, M; Takahashi, M; Hayano, M (2001); Diving Injuries and Fatalities in Japan.

=== 2002 ===
- Dunford, RG; Vann, RD; Gerth, WA; Pieper, CF; Huggins, KE; Wacholtz, CJ; Bennett, PB (2002); The incidence of venous gas emboli in recreational diving.
- Reed, WL; Freiberger, JJ; Vann, RD; DeNoble, PJ (2002); Descriptive analysis of a recreational diving accident database.
- Sheffield, PJ; Vann, RD (2002); Flying After Diving Workshop. Contents; Dedication About DAN Acknowledgments; 2002 Consensus guidelines for flying after recreational diving; Executive summary - RD Vann; Opening remarks - RD Vann; Flying after diving guidelines: A historical perspective - PJ Sheffield; 1999 U.S. Navy procedures for ascent to altitude after diving - ET Flynn; Diving at the No-stop limits: Chamber trials of flying after diving - RD Vann; Flying after multi-day repetitive recreational diving - JJ Freiberger; Development of guidelines for flying after diving - ED Thalmann, RD Vann, NW Pollock, and WA Gerth; Trials of flying at 25,000 feet after diving - NW Pollock; NASA flying after diving procedures - NW Pollock and DT Fitzpatrick; Economic impact of flying after diving - JJ Freiberger; Flying after diving within the no-decompression limits - RD Vann; Nature of safety decisions - PJ Sheffield; Consensus discussion;
- Vann, RD; Freiberger, JJ; DeNoble, PJ; Uguccioni, DM; Reed, WL; Perkins, RW (2002); Association of the clinical presentation of DCI with treatment outcome.
- Weathersby, PK; Gerth, WA (2002); Survival Analysis & Maximum Likelihood Techniques as Applied to Physiological Model. Contents: Preface - WA. Gerth; Welcome - PK. Weathersby; Workshop Origin - ED. Thalmann; Overview of Survival Functions and Methodology - WA. Gerth; NMRl Models of CNS Oxygen Toxicity Modeling - PK. Weathersby; Diver Tolerance to Breathing Resistance - J Clarke; A Log-Logistic Survival Model Applied to Hypobaric Decompression Sickness - J Conkin; Testing of Hypotheses About Basic Mechanisms with Risk Functions - HD. Van Liew; Survival Models for Altitude Decompression Sickness - N Kannan; Multinomial Bubble Score Model - P Tikuisis, KA. Gault; Probabilistic Models of DCS During Flying After Diving: Motivation for Mechanism - WA. Gerth; Improving on a "Good" Model - EC. Parker, SS. Survanshi, PK. Weathersby; Meta Analysis of Diver Decompression Data - PK. Weathersby, DA. Temple, EC. Parker; Cold Exposure Survival Model - Peter Tikuisis; Critique of Methodology - Frank E. Harrell, Louis D. Homer; Promising Approaches to Experimental Design - Louis D. Homer; Directions in Statistical Methodology for Multivariable Predictive Modeling - FE. Harrell, Jr; General Discussion; Close - WA. Gerth.

=== 2003 ===
- Cianci, PE; Slade, JB (2003); Delayed treatment of decompression sickness with short oxygen tables.
- Caruso, JL; Uguccioni, DM; Ellis, JE; Dovenbarger, JA; Bennett, PB (2003); Buddy versus solo diving in fatal recreational diving accidents.
- DeNoble, PJ; Uguccioni, DM; Forbes, R; Vann, RD (2003); The incidence of decompression illness in recreational diving is not homogeneous.
- Freiberger, JJ; DeNoble, PJ; Uguccioni, DM; Vann, RD (2002); An association between flying with symptoms of DCS and residuals after recompression treatment.
- Griffin, C; Aksenov, IV; Kooistra, D (2003); Evaluation of the 140 medical records of decompression illness at the Saba Marine Park Hyperbaric Facility 13-year experience.
- Lippmann, J (2003); First aid oxygen administration for divers.
- Robison, JD; Reed, WL; Freiberger, JJ; Pollock, NW (2003); Perceived quality of life among previously injured recreational divers: A pilot study.
- Vote, DAP; Vann, RD (2003); DAN USA Ascent Rate Study (Abstract only – work in progress).
- Wacholtz, CJ; DeNoble, PJ (2003); Air ambulance evacuation cost not correlated to DCI severity or outcome.

=== 2004 ===
- Caruso, JL; Uguccioni, DM; Ellis, JE; Dovenbarger, JA; Bennett, PB (2004); Diving fatalities involving children and adolescents, 1989–2002.
- Caruso, JL; Uguccioni, DM; Ellis, JE; Dovenbarger, JA; Bennett, PB (2004); Do divers in trouble ditch their weight belts or integrated weights? A look at the ditching of weight belts in fatal recreational diving accidents.
- Chappell, C; Payne, SJ (2004); The automated extraction of the characteristics of blood cell and bubble movement from doppler ultrasound recordings.
- DeNoble, PJ; Vann, RD; Bennett, PB; Marroni, A, (2004); Ten years of prospective studies in recreational diving.
- DeNoble, PJ; Vann, RD; Freiberger, JJ; Brubakk, AO (2004); Pattern analysis of depth-time profiles recorded by dive computers.
- Freiberger, JJ; Lyman, SJ; Peiper, CF; Vann, RD (2004); Consensus factors used by experts in the diagnosis of DCI.
- Richardson, D (2004); Flying after diving DAN Workshop 2002 - an overview.
- Smerz, RW; Nakayama, H; Overlock, R (2004); Hawaiian Deep Treatments, Efficacy and Outcomes, 1983–2001.
- Vann, RD; DeNoble, PJ; Uguccioni, DM; Freiberger, JJ; Forbes, R; Pieper, CF (2004); Incidence of decompression sickness (DCS) in four recreational diving population samples.
- Vann, RD; Freiberger, JJ; DeNoble, PJ; Dovenbarger, JA; Nord, D; Winkler, P; Marroni, A (2004); Flying after recompression therapy.

=== 2005 ===
- Freiberger, JJ; Smerz, RW; DeNoble, PJ; Vann, RD (2005); Hawaii deep treatment diving injury data collected with the new DAN injury report form, the Scuba Diving Epidemiological Report Form (SERF).
- Longphre, JP; Freiberger, JJ; DeNoble, PJ; Vann, RD (2005); Utility of first aid oxygen prior to recompression treatment for diving injuries.
- Marroni, A; Bennett, PB; Cronje, FJ; Cali-Corleo, R; Germonpre, P; Pieri, M; Bonuccelli, C; Balestra, C (2005); A deep stop during decompression from 82 fsw (25 m) significantly reduces bubbles and fast tissue gas tensions.
- Mitchell, SJ; Doolette, DJ; Wacholz, CJ; Vann, RD (2005); Management of Mild or Marginal Decompression Illness in Remote Locations Workshop Proceedings.
- Pollock, NW; Uguccioni, DM; Dear, GdeL (2005); Diabetes and recreational diving: guidelines for the future.
- Pollock, NW; Uguccioni, DM; Dear, GdeL; Bates, S; Albushies, TM; Prosterman, SA (2005); Plasma glucose response to recreational diving in teenage divers with insulin-requiring diabetes mellitus.
- St Leger Dowse, M; Barnes, R; Smerdon, G; Bryson, P (2005); Time to fly after hyperbaric chamber treatment for decompression illness: current recommendations.
- Uguccioni, DM; Pollock, NW (2005); Results of Divers Alert Network diving incident report survey.
- Vann, RD; Denoble, PJ; Uguccioni, DM; Pollock, NW; Freiberger, JJ; Pieper, CF; Gerth, WA; Forbes, R (2005); The Risk of Decompression Sickness (DCS) is Influenced by Dive Conditions.
- Vann, RD; DeNoble, PJ; Uguccioni, DM; Pollock, NW; Freiberger, JJ; Pieper, CF; Gerth, WA (2005); Decompression sickness (DCS) risk is influenced by dive conditions as well as by depth-time profile.
- Worth, ER; Patel, N; Freiberger, JJ (2005); A case of recurring neurologic decompression illness: Or is it?
- DeNoble, PJ; Vann, RD; Pollock, NW; Uguccioni, DM; Freiberger, JJ; Pieper, CF (2005); A case-control study of decompression sickness (DCS) and arterial gas embolism (AGE).

=== 2006 ===
- Bouak, F; Eaton, DJ (2006), Determining the potential of the HI-OX80 open circuit mask and the REMO2 closed circuit rebreather for remote diving accidents.
- Dear, GdeL; Freiberger, JJ; DeNoble, PJ; Uguccioni, DM; Moon, RE; Vann, RD (2006); Older divers and outcomes after the treatment of decompression illness.
- DeNoble, PJ; Pollock, NW; Dear, GdeL; Uguccioni, DM; Vann, RD (2006); Diving fatalities involving divers with diabetes mellitus.
- Lang, MA (2006); The state of oxygen-enriched air (nitrox)
- Lindholm, P; Pollock, NW; Lundgren, CEG (2006); Breath-hold Diving Workshop Proceedings.
- Mitchell, SJ; Doolette, DJ; Wacholz, CJ; Vann, RD (2006); Management of mild or marginal decompression illness in remote locations workshop proceedings. [Final consensus statements, editorial notes and executive summary]
- Modi, SJ; Pollock, NW (2006); Development of the DAN breath-hold incident database; 2004–2005.
- Pollock, NW; Uguccioni, DM; Dear, GdeL (2006); Diabetes and recreational diving: Guidelines for the future.
- Pollock, NW; Wiley, JL; Ellis, JE (2006); A review of available breath-hold incident records, 1994–2003.
- Shapshak, D; Cianci, PE (2006); Treatment of decompression illness with short oxygen tables: A five-year experience.

=== 2007 ===
- Denoble, PJ; Caruso, JL; Dear, GdeL; Pieper, CF; Vann, RD (2007); Application of the Pareto principle to recreational diving deaths.
- Denoble, PJ; Ellis, J; Vann, RD (2007); Fatalities in divers using rebreathers.
- Hobbs, GW; Armstrong, BM; Armstrong, HC; Schreiber, JS; Kaylor, ZM; Vann, RD (2007): What can the medical community do for technical divers?
- Longphre, JM; Denoble, PJ; Moon, RE; Vann, RD; Freiberger, JJ (2007); First aid normobaric oxygen for the treatment of recreational diving injuries.
- Moon, RE; Piantadosi, CA; Camporesi, EM (2007); Dr. Peter Bennett Symposium Proceedings. Contents: Foreword - Drs. Moon, Piantadosi, Camporesi; Dr. Bennett's Concluding Appreciation - Dr. Peter Bennett; A History of Deep Commercial Diving - Dr. John Bevan; Nitrogen Narcosis, HPNS and Trimix - Dr. Jean-Claude Rostain and N Balon; The Atlantis Series and Other Deep Dives - Dr. Enrico Camporesi; Deep Diving and the Lung - Dr. Richard Moon; An Historical Overview of Recreational Scuba Diving - Dr. Frans Cronje; From Rec to Tec: The Future of Technical Diving - Dr. Drew Richardson; Technical Diving - Dr. Simon Mitchell; The Physiology of Breath-Hold Diving - Dr. Claes Lundgren; The History of Divers Alert Network (DAN) and DAN Research - Dr. Richard Vann; Appendix - Dr Bennett's CV.
- Uguccioni, DM; Natoli, MJ; Comfort, BJ; Justus, MA; Freiberger, JJ; Vann, RD (2007); Nasopharyngeal pressure during middle ear equalization: A device to support investigation of aural barotrauma.
- Vann, RD; Pollock, NW; Denoble, PJ (2007); Rebreather Fatality Investigation.
- Vann, RD; Pollock, NW; Freiberger, JJ; Natoli, MJ; DeNoble, PJ; Pieper, CF (2007); Influence of bottom time on preflight surface intervals before flying after diving.
- Vinhaes, ENG; Bammann, RH (2007); Hope in the future: Beginning, development and present situation of hyperbaric medicine in Brazil.

=== 2008 ===
- Buzzacott, P; Denoble, PJ; Vann, RD (2008); Diving experience and anthropometry associated with out-of-air, buoyancy trouble, and rapid ascent.
- Demchenko, IT; Ruehle, A; Allen, BW; Vann, RD; Piantadosi, CA (2008); Effects of Phosphodiesterase-5 inhibitors on cerebral blood flow and seizures in rats exposed to HBO2.
- Denoble, PJ; Vaithyanathan, P; Vann, RD (2008); Annual diving fatality rates among insured DAN members.
- Dovenbarger, JA; Burman, F; Pollock, NW (2008); Divers Alert Network recompression chamber assistance program.
- Gutvik, CR; Zeljko, D; Dunford, R; Brubakk, AO (2008); Parameter estimation of the Copernicus decompression model.
- Lippmann, J (2008); Review of scuba diving fatalities and decompression illness in Australia.
- Zeigler, E; Buzzacott, P; Denoble, PJ; Vann, RD (2008); Characteristics of cave diving fatalities before and after 1980.

=== 2009 ===
- Denoble, P; Dunford, R; Sayer, M; Pollock, N; Nord, D; Vann, R (2009); Predicted probability of decompression sickness in 159 treated cases with documented dive profiles.
- Denoble, P; Vaithiyanathan, P; Clarke, D; Vann, R (2009); Annual rate of decompression sickness (DCS) based on insurance claims.
- Ozyigit, T; Egi, S; Denoble, P; Balestra, C; Aydin, S; Vann, R; Marroni, A (2009); Classification of decompression illness (DCI) by cluster analysis.
- Walker, D; Lippmann, J; Lawrence, CL; Houston, J; Fock, A (2009); Provisional report on diving-related fatalities in Australian waters 2004.
- Vann, RD; Mitchell, SJ; Denoble, PJ; Anthony, TG (2009); Technical Diving Conference Proceedings. Contents; Acknowledgements; Conference summary - RD. Vann; Physiology workshop chairman's summary - SJ. Mitchell; Respiratory issues in technical diving - SJ. Mitchell; Central nervous system oxygen toxicity - RD. Vann, RW. Hamilton; Nitrogen narcosis, oxygen narcosis, and the high pressure nervous syndrome - PB. Bennett, SJ. Mitchell; Thermal concerns in cold water diving - ML. Nuckols; Decompression workshop chairman's summary - RD. Vann; Pathophysiology of decompression illness - RE. Moon; Risk factors for decompression sickness - DJ. Doolette, RD. Vann; Deep stops and their efficacy in decompression - WA. Gerth, DJ. Doolette, KA. Gault; Assessing the risk of decompression sickness - RD. Vann, PJ. Denoble, DJ. Doolette; Therapy for decompression illness - SJ. Mitchell, R Pyle, RE. Moon; Rebreather workshop chairman's summary - TG Anthony; Testing divers’ underwater breathing apparatus: the u.S. Navy perspective - DE. Warkander; Diving re-breathing apparatus testing and standards: uk/eu perspective - TG Anthony; Rebreather accident investigation - JR. Clarke; Manufacturers panel discussion - G Anthony, A Deas, P Haynes, J Jablonski, G Melton, P Nawrocky, M Parker, P Readey, L Scamahorn, W Stone; Training workshop chairman's summary - PJ. Denoble; Risk assessment analysis: Expedition Britannic 2006 - J Chatterton, R Kohler; Common causes of fatalities in technical diving - PJ. Denoble; Training panel discussion - PJ. Denoble, S Barsky, J Bozanic, S Harrison, T Mount, K Shreeves, P Haynes, D Pence, J Jablonski; Written answers to training questions -S Barsky, J Bozanic, S Harrison, T Mount, K Shreeves, P Haynes, D Pence, J Jablonski.

=== 2010 ===
- Walker, D; Lippmann, J; Lawrence, CL; Fock, A; Wodak, T; Jamieson, S (2010); Provisional report on diving-related fatalities in Australian waters 2005.
- Zeindler, PR; Freiberger, JJ (2010); Triage and emergency evacuation of recreational divers: a case series analysis.

=== 2011 ===
- Denoble, PJ; Marroni, A; Vann, RD (2011); Annual Fatality Rates and Associated Risk Factors for Recreational Scuba Diving.
- Denoble, PJ; Richardson, D; Cumming, B; Lippmann, J; Marroni, A; Vann, RD (2011); Fatality rates in recreational scuba diving: A summary of statistics presented at DAN Fatality Workshop 2010
- Dunford, RG; Vann, RD; Li, L; Forbes, R; Denoble, PJ; Gerth, WA; Marroni, A (2011); Risks of Decompression sickness (DCS) in 125,091 air or N_{2}/O_{2} recreational dives.
- Lippmann, J (2011); Diving Deaths Down Under.
- Lippmann, J; Walker, D; Lawrence, CL; Fock, A; Wodak, T; Jamieson, S (2011); Provisional report on diving-related fatalities in Australian waters 2006.
- Peacher, DF; Otteni, C; Fraser, JAV; Freiberger, JJ; Natoli, MJ; Schinazi, EA; Doar, PO; Boso, AE; Alford, EL; Moon, RE (2011); Pulmonary hemodynamics during coldwater exercise in subjects who have experienced immersion pulmonary edema and the effect of sildenafil.

=== 2012 ===
- Balestra, C (2012); Dive Computer Use in Recreational Diving: Insights from the DAN-DSL Database.
- Denoble, PJ; Ranapurwalla, S; Vaithiyanathan, P; Bird, N (2012); Online survey of health status of DAN members.
- Denoble PJ; Ranapurwala SI; Vaithiyanathan P; Clarke RE; Vann RD (2012); Per-capita claims rate for decompression sickness (DCS) among insured Divers Alert Network (DAN) members.
- Goldman, S; Campbell, S (2012); Application of interconnected and parallel decompression models to PDE data.
- Pollock NW; Riddle MF; Wiley JM; Martina SD; Mackey MN (2012); Divers Alert Network breath-hold incident database review: 2006–2011.
- Thom SR; Milovanova TN; Bogush M; Bhopale VM; Yang M.; Bushmann K; Pollock NW; Ljubkovic M; Denoble PJ; Dujic Z (2012); Microparticle production, neutrophil activation and intravascular bubbles following open-water scuba diving.

=== 2013 ===
- Goldman, S (2013); An improved new class of decompression models that are relevant to scientific and recreational diving.
- Held HE; Pilla R; Dean JB (2013); Oral pseudoephedrine hydrochloride administration decreases latency to central nervous system oxygen toxicity in male and female rats.
