= Canadian Armed Forces Divers =

Underwater divers employed by any of the Canadian armed forces

Canadian Armed Forces (CAF) divers are specialists trained to perform underwater operations within their respective environmental commands. CAF divers are qualified in several sub-categories, including: Clearance Divers (CL Diver), Search and Rescue Technicians (SAR Tech), Port Inspection Divers (PID), Ship's Team Divers, and Combat Divers.

== Training ==
The CAF training agencies authorized to conduct CAF diving programs are:

1. Fleet Diving Unit (Atlantic) (FDU (A))
2. Fleet Diving Unit (Pacific) (FDU (P))
3. Army Dive Centre (ADC)

== Clearance Divers ==
Royal Canadian Navy Clearance Divers are trained to perform a variety of diving operations. These operations include the use of traditional open-circuit diving equipment (SCUBA), lightweight portable surface-supplied diving systems, commercial-grade mixed-gas surface-supplied systems and mixed-gas rebreather systems such as the CCDA and CUMA sets.

Clearance Divers are also equipped to operate fixed and portable hyperbaric chambers, enabling them to conduct complex underwater tasks, including diving medicine and decompression operations.

Canada currently has two operational diving units; RCN Clearance Diving Officers and Clearance Divers and Port Inspection Divers. Both units perform a variety of core capabilities.

These core capabilities are:

- Battle Damage Repair (BDR)
- Maritime Explosive Ordnance Disposal (MEOD)
- Mine Countermeasures (MCM)
- Force Protection Support (FPS)

They also perform secondary or support functions to these core capabilities that include:

- Improvised Explosive Device Disposal (IEDD) for devices found in military establishments within defined areas of responsibility in Canada;
- Submarine Search and Rescue (SUBSAR) first line response (RCC and light-weight Surface Supplied Diving equipment)
- Second line response (ROVs and/or diving);
- Provision of a minimum six-person 45 metre CABA diving team on each coast for emergencies.
- Diving Support Roles (which amplifies Para 13 b.) consist of:
1. Underwater ship and infrastructure maintenance
2. Light salvage
3. Seabed search
4. Underwater demolitions
5. Inspection, maintenance and repair of critical diver life support equipment.
6. Operation of Working Class Remote Operated Vehicle (ROV), Inspection Class ROV, ROV Simulator, Diver Evaluation Systems, and side scan sonar (SSS)
7. Support for medical treatment in hyperbolic chamber

The two operational naval diving units are:

- Fleet Diving Unit Pacific based at CFB Esquimalt, British Columbia.
- Fleet Diving Unit Atlantic based near Halifax in CFB Shearwater, Nova Scotia.

The Royal Canadian Clearance Diver motto is "Strength in depth".

Clearance Diving Officers and Divers also serve at:

- the Experimental Diving Unit (EDU) at Defence Research and Development Canada
- the EOD School in CFB Gagetown, New Brunswick.
- Director of Diving Safety (D Dive S), at the National Defence Headquarters (NDHQ) in Ottawa, Ontario.

Royal Canadian Navy Clearance Divers' Prayer

On 30 April 2015 the RCN Clearance Diving occupation adopted the following prayer as their official occupation prayer. The prayer was originally written by Padre David Jackson, the unit chaplain of Fleet Diving Unit Atlantic, for the occasion of the 60th Anniversary of the RCN Clearance Diving occupation. The prayer is based on Psalm 146:6. & 139:9-10. and also incorporates the occupation motto "Strength in Depth".

- English: Lord God Almighty, who made heaven and earth, the sea, and all that is in them; we ask You to look with favour upon us, the members of the Royal Canadian Navy Clearance Diving Branch, that as we dwell in the uttermost parts of the sea, even there Your hand may lead us, and your right hand may hold us. Be our strength in depth and preserve us from all the perils of the sea and the assaults of the enemy; that we may serve Queen, Country and Branch with loyalty, courage and honour. Amen.
- French: Dieu Tout-Puissant, Toi qui a créé le ciel et la terre, la mer avec tout ce qu'elle contient; Nous te demandons de tourner ton regard vers nous les membres de la Branche des Plongeurs Démineurs de la Marine Royale Canadienne surtout lorsque nous sommes dans les profondeurs de la mer. Là aussi ta main puisse nous conduire, Et ta droite nous saisir. Sois notre force dans les profondeurs et préserve-nous de tous les dangers de la mer et de nos ennemis; pour que nous puissions servir la Reine, notre pays et la Branche avec loyauté, courage et honneur. Amen

== Combat divers ==
=== History ===
Diving in the Canadian Army began in the 1960s when, as a result of the introduction of amphibious vehicles, it was essential to provide a diving capability to the safety organization for the swimming of the vehicles. Amphibious operations also required better underwater reconnaissance of crossing sites. Following trials in 1966, diving sections were established in engineer units in 1969. Once diving was established, additional tasks were added to make combat diving an extension of combat engineering, such as obstacle construction and breaching, employing and detecting landmines, and limited underwater construction.

=== General Description ===
Combat divers equip the Army with the ability to execute combat engineer tasks underwater. As combat engineers first and foremost, their diving responsibilities are considered secondary to their primary role. When a specific task is identified and assigned, they are organised into mission-specific teams to provide targeted support for operations.

=== Niche area ===
Combat divers primarily operate on inland waterways, working both on the surface and underwater using breathing apparatus. Their tasks usually take place near shorelines and riverbanks, supporting the Army during land operations. Occasionally, they may operate in saltwater environments to provide support for Army missions. In certain scenarios, combat divers may be tasked with conducting reconnaissance near enemy forces. These reconnaissance missions are carried out with the backing of maneuver forces, which can provide observation support and suppressive fire to aid the dive team.

Canada's Combat Divers are an Occupation Sub-Specialisation (OSS) in its Army Combat Engineer Regiments.

== See also ==
- Professional Diving
