= New World Publications =

Recreational dive guide publisher

- Founded: 1972
- Founder: Ned DeLoach
- Country of origin: United States
- Headquarters location: Jacksonville, Florida
- Publication types: Books
- Nonfiction topics: Nature
- Official website: www.fishid.com

New World Publications is a publishing company that was founded in 1972 with the printing of a 48-page booklet Diving and Recreational Guide to Florida Springs by Ned DeLoach. A few years later, the Diving Guide to the Florida Keys was published under the newly formed New World Publications. Several subsequent editions were combined in 1977 and greatly expanded into Ned DeLoach's Diving Guide to Underwater Florida, which currently is its 11th edition.

== History ==
In the early 1980s, a mutual friend introduced DeLoach to Paul Humann. A few years later, when the new owners of Ocean Realm magazine appointed DeLoach to the position of editor-in-chief, he invited Humann to join him as co-editor. Under their guidance, the once-floundering publication became a success. It was during their two years at the magazine's helm that they discovered how well they worked together. When Ocean Realm was sold, they decided to leave the magazine business and concentrate their efforts on developing a series of marine life field guides for divers.

During Humann's decade-long stint as owner and operator of the Cayman Diver, he amassed an extensive library of underwater images. Combining his knowledge of marine wildlife and the dive business with DeLoach's background in education and publishing, the pair published the first edition of Reef Fish Identification - Florida, Caribbean, Bahamas in 1989. Since then, the field guide has gone through 14 printings of three editions. The fish identification guide was soon followed by two companion volumes, Reef Creature Identification (1992) and Reef Coral Identification (1993). Combined, these make up the Reef Set, New World Publications' most popular volumes.

In 1993, Eric Riesch joined New World Publications to manage the business. Under his marketing, the second edition of Reef Fish Identification was awarded the Independent Book Publisher's Ben Franklin Award for best reference book of 1994. In 1995, DeLoach joined forces with his wife, Anna, to spend every summer for the next 5 years in Bimini studying fish behavior. The result of their efforts was the 2000 publication Reef Fish Behavior - Florida Caribbean Bahamas.

The format, originally conceived for the tropical western Atlantic identification books, spawned a series of fish identification books for other regions. The region included the Galapagos Islands, the West Coast from California to Alaska and the Gulf of California to Panama. Humann and DeLoach partnered with the late John Jackson of Odyssey Publishing, ichthyologist Gerry Allen and Australian photographer Roger Steene for the 2003 publication of Reef Fish Identification - Tropical Pacific. New World also published Nudibranch Behavior by Dave Behrens; Sea Salt by Stan Waterman and Diving Pioneers by Bret Gilliam. It later helped distribute works for friends Howard Hall, Cathy Church, Helmut Debelius and Constantinos Petrinos. Anna DeLoach produced the DVDs Sensational Seas (2004), Reef Fish Identification - A Beginning Course (2007), and Sensational Seas Two (2010).

In November 2010, after five years of extensive field photography in the Pacific, New World Publications published Reef Creature Identification - Tropical Pacific, the most comprehensive field guide ever published about the marine invertebrate community of the vast region stretching from Thailand to Tahiti.
