= Lunocet =

Biomimetic monofin

The Lunocet is a biomimetic monofin to reduce drag and augment human swimming ability underwater. It is modeled after a dolphin's tail, by replicating its geometry, scale, and morphology dynamics of what the manufacturer calls the "lunate tail propulsor," as its shape is similar to a crescent moon.

== Description ==
The Lunocet is a 5.3-pound (2.4 kg) monofin designed by Ted Ciamillo. It is built from aluminum and rubber with a span of 30 inches. It is attached to a diver using road cycling or triathlon shoes screwed to an aluminum plate oriented at a 30-degree angle to the resting plane of the flukes, to compensate for the angle of the ankle when extended.

The manufacturer claims an advantage over traditional fins because of its hydrodynamic shape. It has a high aspect ratio and large surface area, which can propel an experienced diver to a maximum speed of eight mph (13 km/h). That later claimed result matches the world record for 50 m apnea with traditional monofin.

A spring-loaded mechanism adjusts the angle of attack of the flukes using the water pressure from swimming. The rubber spring can be set on three tension settings from flexible for slow relatively efficient swimming to more rigid for sprinting. A cambered foil can be more efficient than a symmetrical foil, but a rigid cambered foil is efficient for producing lift in one direction. The Lunocet uses the water pressure to induce camber in the flexible flukes which are symmetric at rest. The camber is dynamic and changes sides with up and down stroke. The flexibility is mostly at the tips and trailing edge.

Road cycling or triathlon shoes are used to attach the fin to the diver. Power transfer is through the rigid soles into the peduncle (the part which transitions the feet to the flukes). All road cycling and triathlon shoes have a standard bolt-hole pattern which mates with the bolt-hole pattern on the foot deck and can be attached using six stainless steel screws.

== See also ==
- Diving equipment
