= London Diving Chamber Dive Lectures =

Series of public lectures

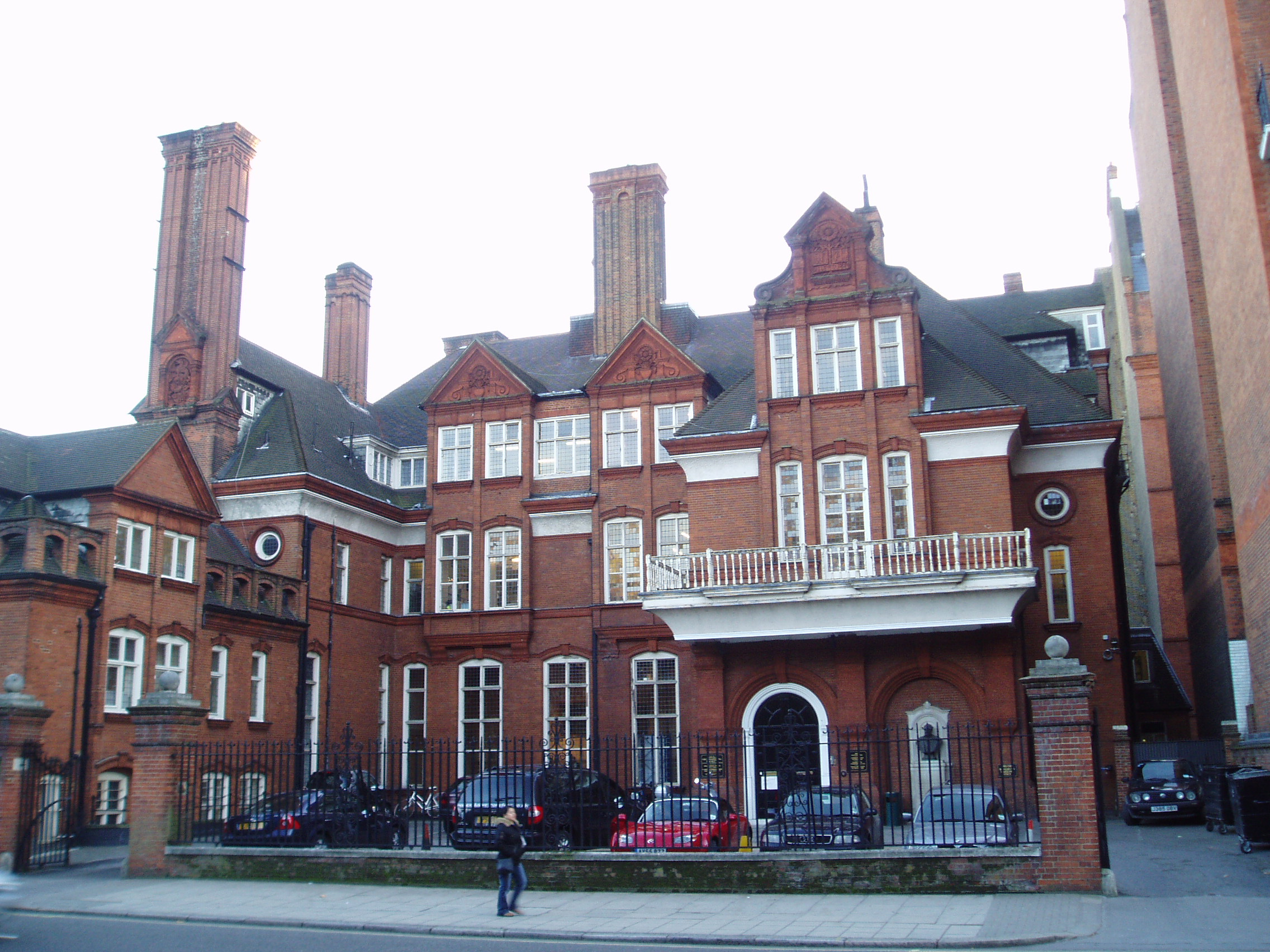
Lowther Lodge, Royal Geographical Society, Kensington Gore, London

The Dive Lectures were a series of public lectures that were hosted at the Royal Geographical Society in London from 2002 to 2018 with the London Diving Chamber to promote exploration and adventure sports. Featuring keynote presentations by well-known figures in diving, television, exploration, photography and environmentalism, the lectures developed into a well-attended social and professional forum for the British scuba industry as well as a popular fund-raising occasion for diving-related charities.

== Dive Lectures ==
The first Dive Lecture was inaugurated in March 2002 under the auspices of the London Diving Chamber which provides NHS-funded recompression to divers with Decompression Sickness (DCS) together with other Hyperbaric Oxygen Therapy (HBOT) treatments from its recompression chamber at The Hospital of St John & St Elizabeth in St. John's Wood, London.

Sometimes held annually, sometimes biannually, the lectures are free to attend but also act as fund-raising occasions for diving-related charities such as The Scuba Trust, an organisation helping divers with disabilities.

In 2005, the lectures took up their now regular venue at the RGS. Initially, they were held in the Map Room of Lowther Lodge, subsequent events have been held in the 500-seat auditorium, The Ondaatje Theatre.

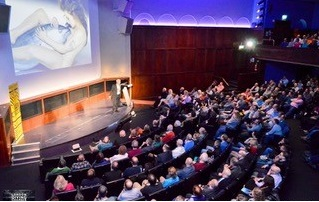
The explorer and TV presenter Paul Rose addresses the 2017 Dive Lecture in The Ondaatje Theater at the Royal Geographical Society, London

== Speakers 2007-17 ==
From its inception in 2002, the London Diving Chamber Annual Dive Lectures attracted well-known figures from the diving world and celebrities interested in diving to speak to its audience. In its earliest years, the event was introduced by Loyd Grossman and Mariella Frostrup, and speakers included Paul Toomer, Phil Docking and Bob Cole. Since 2007 speakers have included:

Year	Introduction	Speaker 1	Speaker 2
2018		Didier Noirot (confirmed)	Ahmed Gabr (confirmed)
2017		Dawn Kernagis	Paul Rose (TV presenter)
2016	John Prescott	Pat Spain	Graham Hancock
2015		Dr Alex Mustard	Monty Halls
2014		Andy Torbet	Doug Allan
2013		Paul Rose (TV presenter)	Mike Pitts
2012		Rick Stanton	Monty Halls
2011		John Boyle	Dr Jon Copley
2010	Danny Crates	Trevor Norton	Monty Halls
2009		Mike Valentine	Tim Ecott
2008		Monty Halls	Mike Pitts
2007	Terence Stamp	Rick Stanton	Monty Halls
