= Media diving =

Underwater diving in support of the media industries

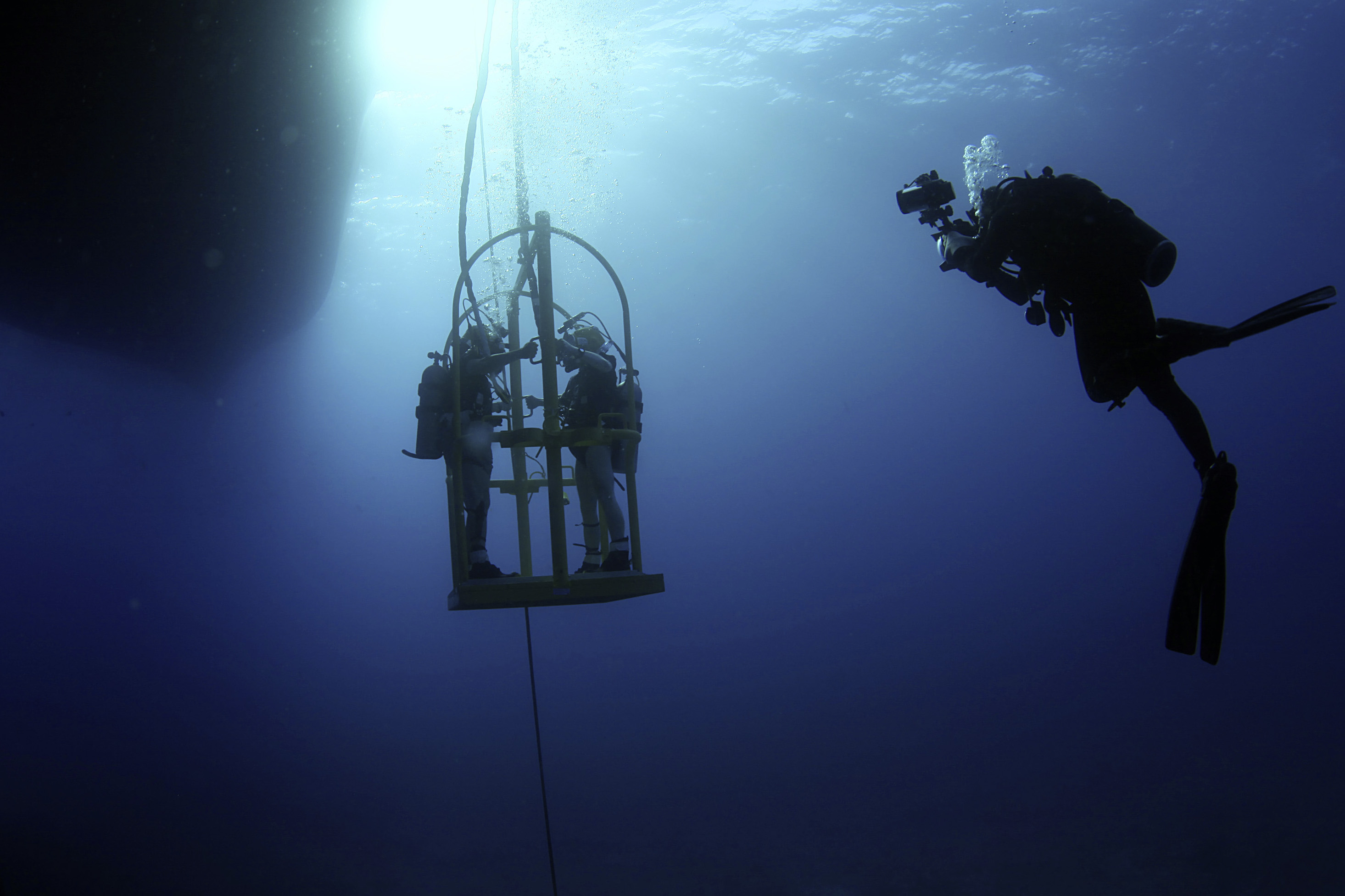
Underwater photographer documenting a surface supplied dive.

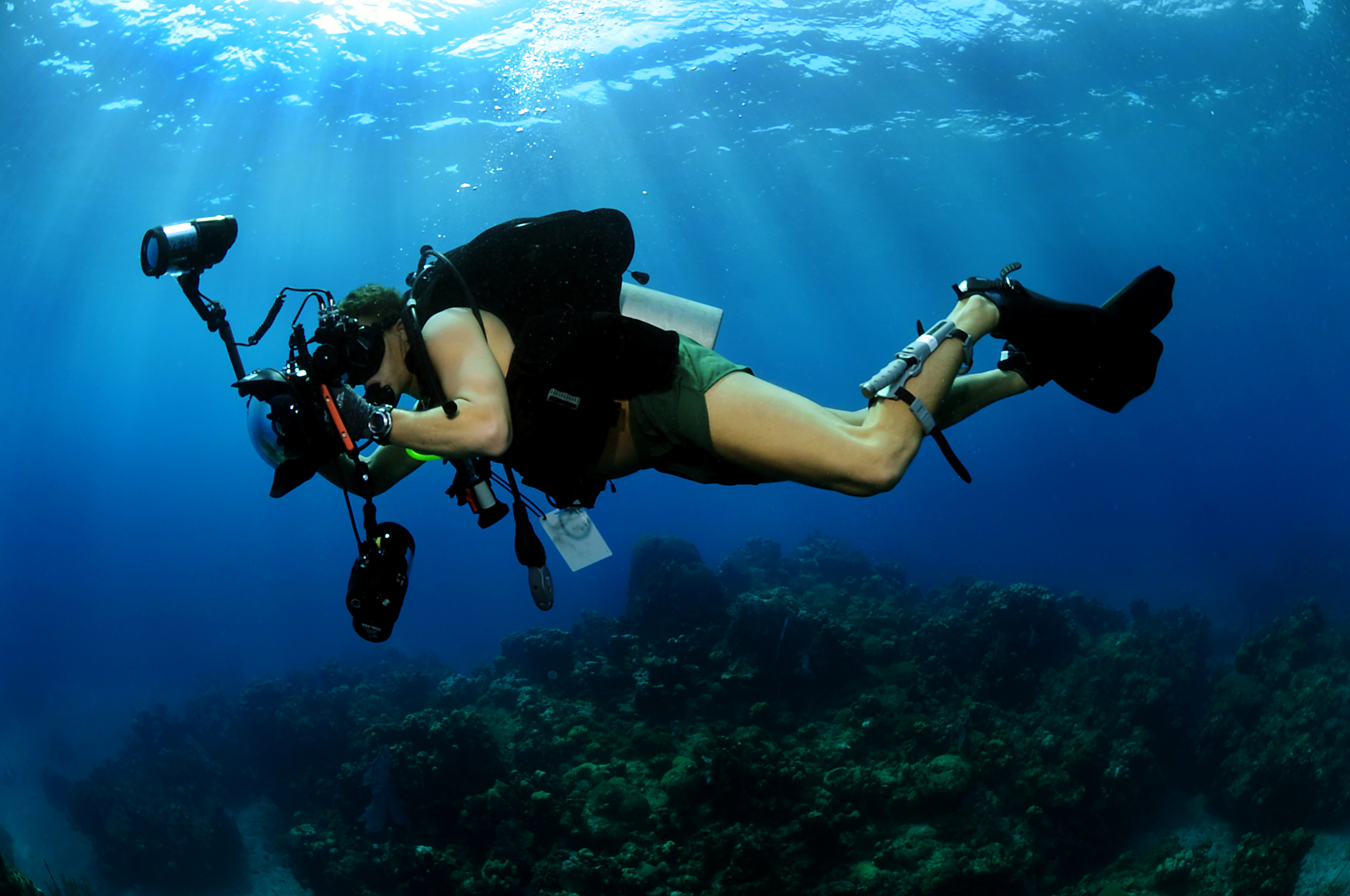

Media diving is underwater diving in support of the media industries, including the practice of underwater photography and underwater cinematography outside of normal recreational interests. Media diving is often carried out in support of television documentaries, such as the BBC series Planet Earth or movies, with feature films such as Titanic and The Perfect Storm featuring underwater photography or footage. Media divers are normally highly skilled camera operators who use diving as a method to reach their workplace, although some underwater photographers start as recreational divers and move on to make a living from their hobby.

Equipment in this field is varied with scuba and surface supplied equipment used, depending on requirements, but rebreathers are often used for wildlife related work as they are normally quiet, release few or no bubbles and allow the diver a lengthy bottom time with a reduced risk of frightening off the subject.

== Applications and scope of work ==
Media diving is professional underwater photography and filming, and related underwater work, often in support of television documentaries or films with underwater footage. Media divers are likely to be skilled camera operators who trained as divers to expand the scope of their operations, though some have started as recreational divers and later turned professional.

Media divers are the diving personnel who are employed or contracted in support of underwater media work, and include photographers, camera operators, sound and lighting technicians, journalists and presenters. They are not the divers who may be needed to prepare the underwater location using engineering and construction skills and equipment, or the use of explosives, which is classified as commercial diving work. In jurisdictions where media diving is considered commercial diving work this distinction falls away, but the code of practice to be followed may still differ according to the actual work of the dive.

The media diver will prepare, clean, and maintain recording equipment such as high definition video cameras in underwater housings, with special underwater lighting, and remote cameras, plan and research dives and expeditions, dive, and shoot footage. Additional tasks commonly include maintaining generators, compressors, diving gear, boats and other diving support equipment. Rebreather skills may be necessary to reduce the impact of diver presence on wildlife, as open circuit scuba is noisy. Remotely operated underwater vehicles may be used for access to depths beyond those accessible to divers.

A safety diver is required whenever performers are in the water or the action requires performers to fall into the water.

== Qualification and registration ==
The qualifications legally required for media diving vary considerably across the world. In some jurisdictions the occupation is simply considered to be an aspect of professional diving, and as it is an activity of employment, the practice falls under occupational health and safety legislation. In other countries there is no legislation specifying requirements.

The UK HSE recognises the risks associated with media diving by issuing a code of practice for media diving, and requires media divers to have an approved qualification appropriate to the specific equipment to be used during an operation.

The requirements for actors and performers and their associated safety divers (including stunt divers and presenters), taking part in a recording session or live performance may differ from those for media divers, and may include recreational diving certification, for example to EN 14153-3/ISO 24801-3 Level 3 "Dive Leader", CMAS 3*, CMAS 3* equivalent in a recreational agency/organisation whose qualifications are approved by HSE for the class of Recreational Diving. In such operations the performers may not be included as part of the diving team for safety purposes.

== Procedural requirements ==
As is the case for other professional diving, the diving contractor may be required to keep an operations logbook in which certain information on the diving operation is recorded. Such information would usually include details of the diving contractor, the members of the dive team, the site location, water and weather conditions, the dive profile, the purpose of the dive, equipment used, and any reportable incidents that may have occurred during the dive. A diving project plan will be drawn up by the diving contractor based on information provided by the client, and will include a risk assessment and a detailed plan for the diving operations.

== Legal status ==
- The Australian/New Zealand Standard 2299 Occupational diving operations; Part 4: Film and photographic diving covers media diving in those countries, and provides requirements and guidance for producers, contractors and employees.
- In the UK the status of media diving and the required qualification are specified in Media diving projects: Diving at Work Regulations 1997: Approved Code of Practice and guidance, and Diving at Work Regulations 1997: List of Approved Diving Qualifications
- In South Africa, media diving is considered to be a branch of commercial diving, and requires the same qualifications for the same mode and depth range.
