= Normocapnia =

Normal arterial carbon dioxide levels

Normocapnia or normocarbia is a state of normal arterial carbon dioxide pressure, usually about 40 mmHg.

== See also ==
- Homeostasis – State of steady internal conditions maintained by living things
- Hypercapnia – Abnormally high tissue carbon dioxide levels
- Hypocapnia – State of reduced carbon dioxide in the blood
