= Minedykkerkommandoen =

Norwegian Navy clearance diver unit

Norwegian Naval EOD Command
- Minedykkerkommandoen (MDK)
- Active: Frogmen: 1953 – 1968; MDK: 1968 – current
- Country: (Norway) Royal Norwegian Navy
- Type: Clearance diver
- Garrison/HQ: Haakonsvern Naval Base; Ramsund Naval Base
- Colors: Blue beret flash on navy beret
- Engagements: Operation Enduring Freedom; International Security Assistance Force; Operation Pickaxe-Handle; Operation Atalanta; Operation Ocean Shield; Macedonia Conflict; Operation Recsyr

Minedykkerkommandoen (MDK) or Norwegian Naval EOD Command is a clearance diver group. MDK is subordinate to the Royal Norwegian Navy. MDK is located at Haakonsvern Naval Base in Bergen and Ramsund Naval Base, in vicinity of Harstad.

The Commando is part of the naval contribution to the Norwegian Armed Forces Intervention Force, and the command's personnel have taken part in operations in Afghanistan, Iraq, Baltic states and Mediterranean, among others. The unit is often on assignment for the Norwegian Police Service with bomb disposal.

== History ==
In 1953 the Norwegian Navy formed a frogman-unit. This unit was under the command of Ove Lund, and is the origin of the modern Minedykkerkommandoen and Marinejegerkommandoen. The mission of the frogmen was to disarm explosive devices and to conduct sabotage against enemy targets above and below water.

The missions gradually become more comprehensive and different frogman specialities emerged. This led to members of the unit being divided into a clearance diver team and two combat swimmer teams, in 1968.

=== Selection and training ===
General selection separates out those who do not have the physical and mental abilities to start the clearance diver course. A candidate must pass a strength test, fitness test and a water stress test.

After passing the general selection, an applicant attends the main selection, performed in the winter. It comprises physical and mental exercises with little food and little sleep. Few of those who enter get through.

Following selection, the potential operator starts basic training for 12 months at the Norwegian Naval Diving School, Dykker- og froskemannskolen. This training involves all of the basic disciplines required to serve as a clearance diver. After training, the candidates who are eligible for operational service are transferred to MDK, to become EOD operators. Further training is conducted domestically or abroad, at allied training facilities. However, they are also trained in some level of CQB and combat tactics necessary for use in an emergency, and trained in maritime search and rescue.

== See also ==
- Explosive ordnance disposal (United States Navy) – US Navy personnel who render safe or detonate unexploded ordnance
- Underwater Demolition Team – US Navy special operations group (Elite special-purpose force established by the US Navy during WW II)
- Minentaucher – Mine clearance divers of the German Navy (German Navy Clearance Divers)
- Swedish Navy EOD – Clearance divers of the Swedish Navy
- Canadian armed forces divers – Underwater divers employed by any of the Canadian armed forces (Canadian Clearance Divers and Combat Divers)
- Commandos Marine – Special operations forces of the French Navy (French Marine Nationale Special Operations Force)
- Clearance Diving Branch (RAN) – Diving unit of the Royal Australian Navy Royal Australian Navy
- Frogman Corps (Denmark) – Danish maritime special operations unit (Danish Maritime Special Force)
- Kystjegerkommandoen (Norwegian Navy Coastal Ranger Command)
- Marinejegerkommandoen – Norwegian naval special operations unit (Norwegian Maritime Special Operations Forces, Command frogmen)
