= Clearance diver =

Navy diver specialised in explosives

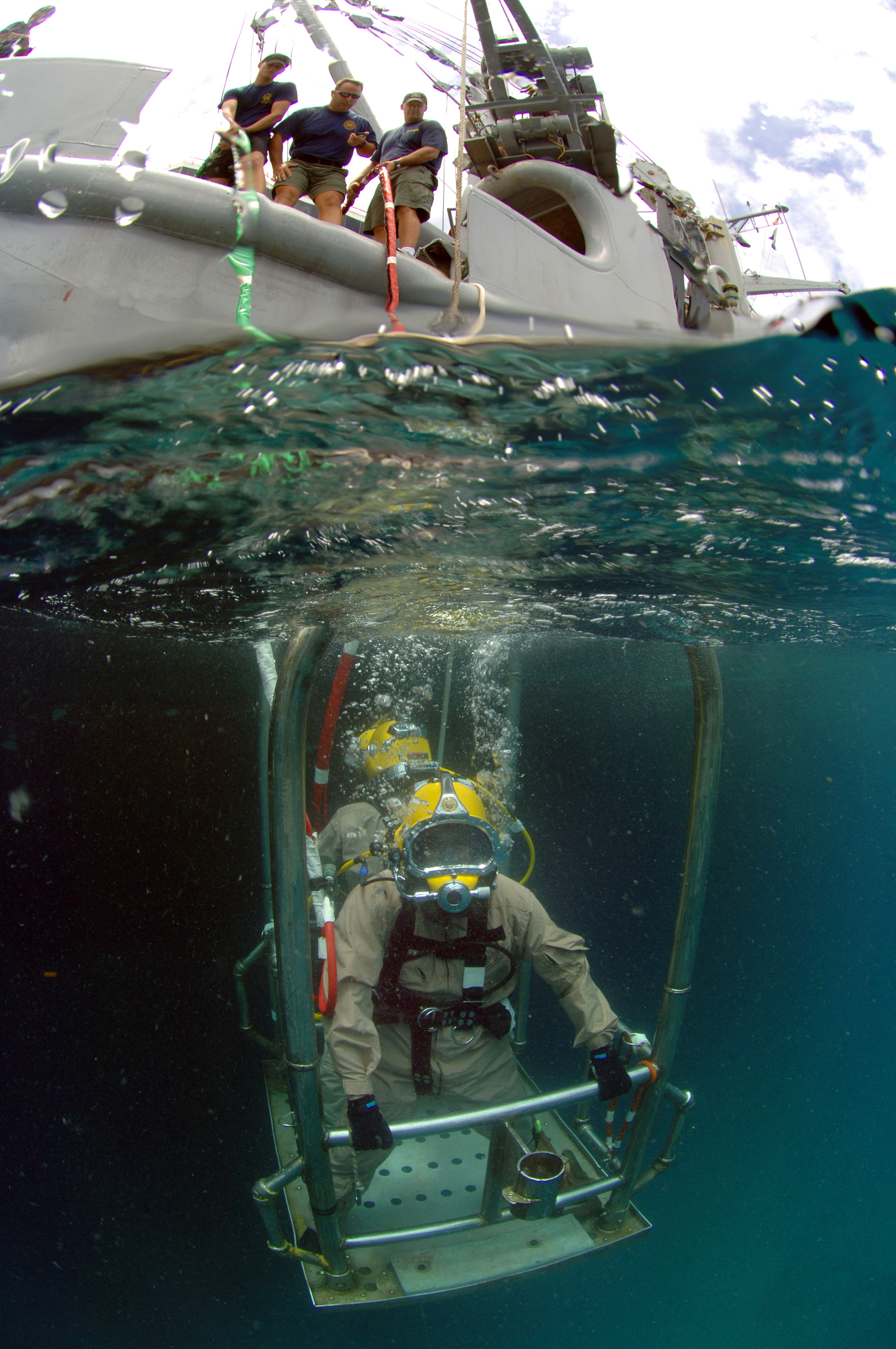
A US Navy work diver is lowered to the sea bed during a dive from the USNS Grasp (T-ARS-51) off the coast of St. Kitts.

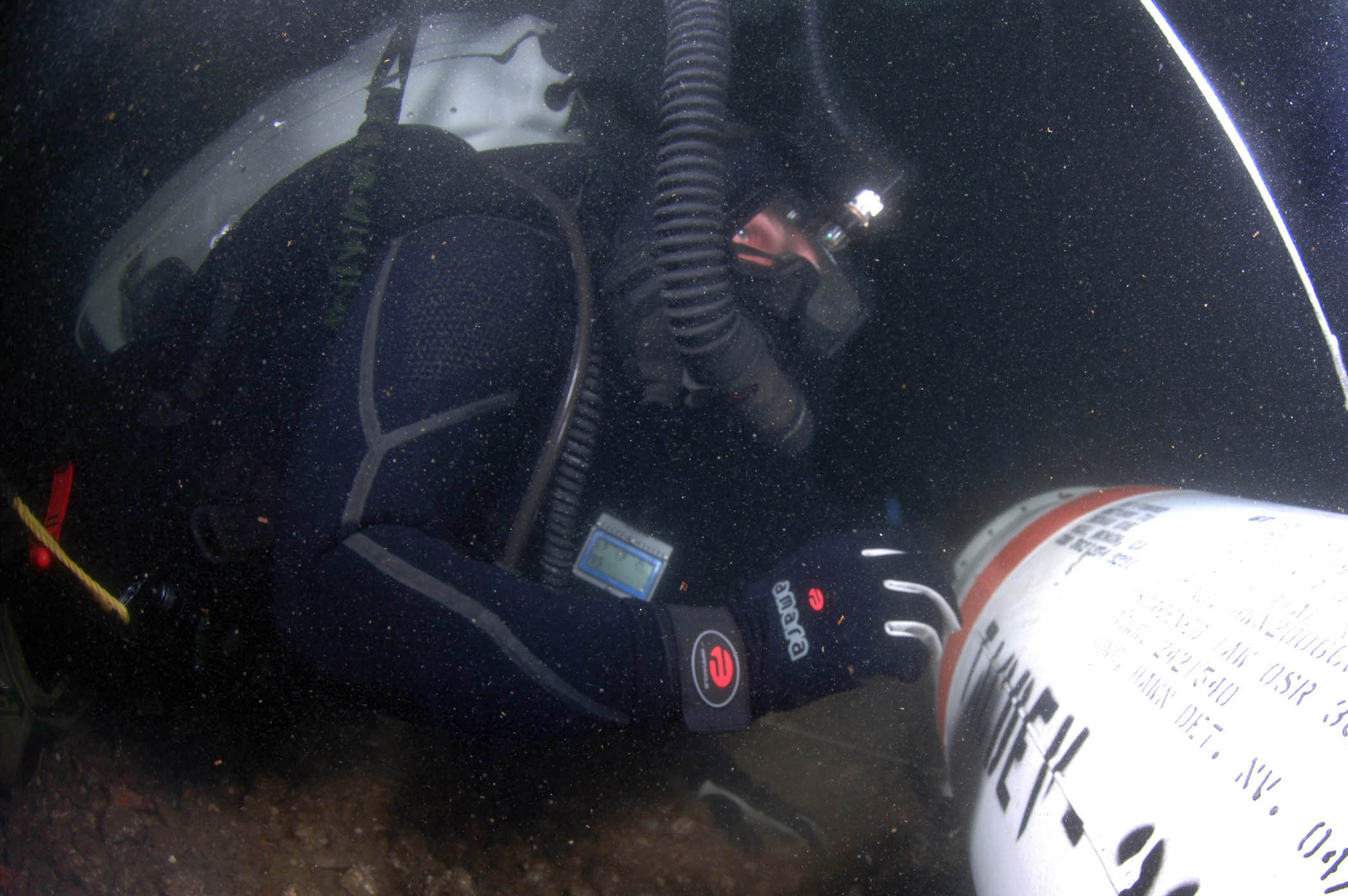
Preparing to raise a mine from the seabed

A clearance diver was originally a specialist naval diver who used explosives underwater to remove obstructions to make harbours and shipping channels safe to navigate, but the term "clearance diver" was later used to include other naval underwater work. Units of clearance divers were first formed during and after World War II to clear ports and harbours in the Mediterranean and Northern Europe of unexploded ordnance and shipwrecks and booby traps laid by the Germans.

== History ==
Clearance Diving takes its name from the operations carried out towards the end and after the Second World War to clear the ports and harbours of the Mediterranean and Northern Europe of unexploded ordnance and booby traps laid by the Germans.This work was undertaken by RN Rendering Mines Safe (RMS) and Bomb Disposal Units and later by Port Clearance Parties or ‘P’ Parties, two of which (Naval Parties 1571 and 1572) went into action soon after D-Day to clear the vast quantities of unexploded ordnance and general debris left after the Allied invasion. They were joined later by other ‘P’ Parties including ‘P’ Parties 1573, 1574, 1575 and 2444 (many of which had Commonwealth naval personnel) and ‘P’ Party 3006 manned by the Dutch.

Work in the European theatre continued until well after the end of the war. Most of the ‘P’ Parties were disbanded, together with HMS Vernon(D) at Brixham, on 30 November 1945. The exceptions were ‘P’ Party 2444, which was still operating at Dunkirk, and ‘P’ Party 2443 which had been formed in June 1945 to deal with residual suspected unexploded ordnance around the UK coast after the war and became based at HMS Vernon, Portsmouth.

The first units were Royal Navy Mine and Bomb Disposal Units. They were succeeded by the "Port Clearance Parties" (P Parties). The first operations by P Parties included clearing away the debris of unexploded ammunition left during the Normandy Invasion. During World War II Navies used the heavy surface-supplied standard diving dress before changing to lighter self-contained rebreather equipment

== Training ==
Admission to clearance diver training requires the candidate to pass medical and physical fitness screening and to be a member of the relevant military force. Additionally, intense training in diving is needed, as well as training in bomb disposal.

Surface Supplied diving techniques, diving supervision planning and execution, using air (50m) and oxy-helium (HeO2 constant partial pressure) breathing apparatus to 60m.

Diving training will be conducted using in-service RN constant partial pressure helium –oxygen equipment (Clearance Diving Life Support Equipment (CDLSE), air surface supplied Open Space Diving System (OSDS) and Swimmers Air Breathing Apparatus (SABA).

== Scope of activity ==
The scope of activity for a clearance diver varies depending on the specific armed force in which they are a member, but historically the most defining competence is skills in underwater demolition using explosives. The closely associated skills in explosive ordnance disposal are also generally implied by the designation.

Clearance divers possess the skills of both expert divers and bomb disposal groups. There tend to be relatively few clearance divers on any given naval ship.

Divers are required to go underwater and de-fuse bombs (EOD Diver) with a starting salary of over $26,000.

The starting salary is the salary given to a diver who has just finished training and is a new recruit. They gain a profession in warfare.

The final salary, after undertaking the job for long enough, will have a higher pay than a recruit as they have gained more experience. A more experienced diver can have a potential salary of over $62,000.

== Nations with clearance diving groups ==
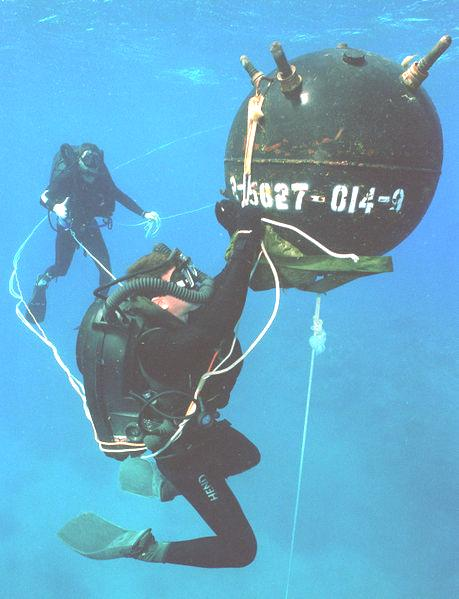
US Navy explosive ordnance disposal (EOD) divers

=== Africa ===
- South Africa

=== Asia ===
- India: The Indian Clearance Divers perform a range of diving tasks. They have a variety of experience in underwater explosives, explosive ordnance disposal, clandestine operations, salvage operations and saturation diving up to 275m.

=== Europe ===
- Denmark: Søværnets Minørtjeneste (EOD clearance diving unit)
- Estonia: EOD Tuukrigrupp (EOD clearance diver unit)
- France: The French Navy clearance divers are known as plongeurs démineurs. The French Army also has clearance divers named plongeurs de combat du génie that operate in freshwater environments. Although they are trained in demolition and explosives clearance, they also survey river banks and possible crossing areas.
- Germany: Minentaucher is Germany's clearance diver force
- Ireland (Republic of): Naval Service Diving Section (NSDS)
- Netherlands: Defensie Duikgroep
- Norway: Minedykkerkommandoen Norway's naval work divers and clearance diver force.
- Portugal: the Sappers Divers Group, which also serve as combat divers unit.
- Sweden: Röjdykare, Swedish Navy EOD division. The Röjdykare perform both domestic EOD operations as well as providing support to Swedish and allied land-based forces in IED clearing, such as in Afghanistan and Mali.
- Poland: Grupa Nurków Minerów (Mining Divers Group) GNM carries out mine defence and special tasks for Polish Navy.https://pl.wikipedia.org/wiki/Grupa_Nurk%C3%B3w_Miner%C3%B3w_(13_Dywizjon_Tra%C5%82owc%C3%B3w)

==== United Kingdom ====
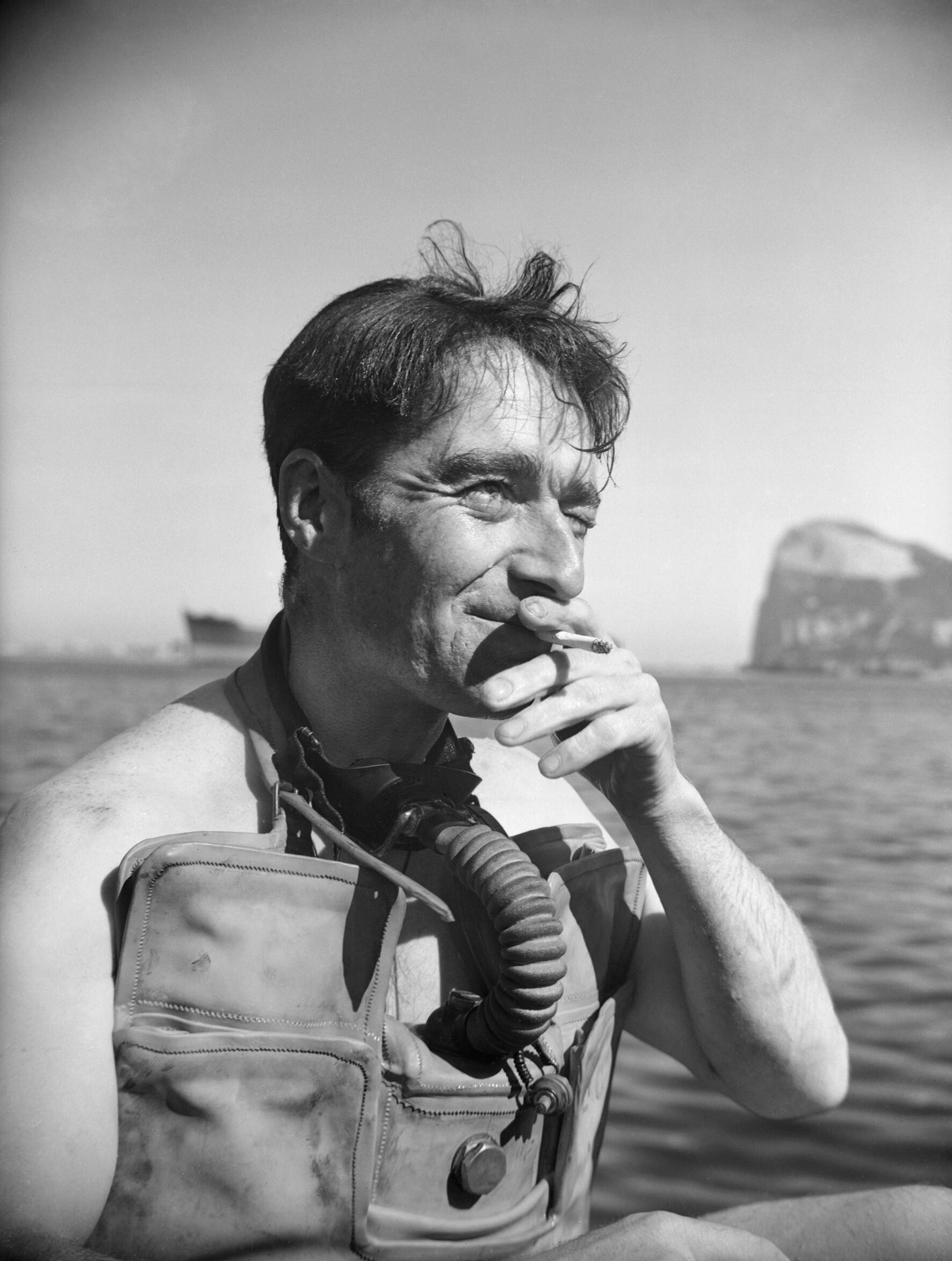
Lionel 'Buster' Crabb, using the DSEA at Gibraltar, April 1944.

Royal Navy divers are officially called Clearance Divers. During WWII divers used the Davis Submerged Escape Apparatus (DSEA), no wetsuit or swimfins. On 17 December 1942, six Italian divers (of Decima Flottiglia MAS) on three manned torpedoes attacked Gibraltar harbour. A British patrol boat killed the crew of one with a depth charge. Their bodies were recovered and their swimfins later used by Gibraltar's guard divers (Sydney Knowles and Commander Lionel Crabb). This was the first known British use of swimfins.

In November 1944, following surrender of Italian forces an Italian frogman brought two Decima Flottiglia issue oxygen rebreathers and a two-piece frogman's drysuit to Livorno, for the Allies to use. This equipment proved better than the Davis Apparatus and lasted longer on a dive. After the war and until the 1990s divers used the Siebe Gorman rebreather and aqualung.

Training to become a Clearance Diver takes around 7 months. Before trainees are accepted onto a course, they must pass a week-long diving aptitude selection, held at the Defence Diving School, on Horsea Island, Portsmouth. This selection involves passing the Divers Physical Fitness Test (DPFT), tests of physical and mental endurance and surface swimming. The candidates are also introduced to the Royal Navy's Swimmers Air Breathing Apparatus and dive in Horsea lake, including night dives. Historically, the failure rate has been high due to the physical and psychological pressures of military diving, so there is a three-day Pre Entry Diving Acquaint (PEDA), which allows prospective candidates to undergo physical and mental tests to give them a better idea of what to expect of the training.

The diving branch is formed of teams, that serve aboard mine hunters, perform domestic bomb, mine and IED disposal and the two Fleet Diving Groups (FDG).

- Expeditionary Diving Group (EDG) comes under 3 Commando Brigade specialising in Very Shallow Water (VSW) beach reconnaissance operations, working alongside UK Special Forces (UKSF). New members are trained in parachuting, maritime counter-terrorism (MCT) tactics and swimmer delivery vehicle (SDV) operations.
- Tactical Diving Group (TDG) is the deep-water warfare unit who specialise in sea mine disposal. Members cross-train with EDG.

Clearance divers have been involved in every major British conflict since their inception and have most recently deployed teams to Iraq, Afghanistan and Libya. They have units operating in the Persian Gulf and Indian Ocean providing an underwater force protection (UWFP) element. See Operation Kipion.

From 2022 Royal Navy Divers will come under the Diving & Threat Exploitation Group (DTXG) based in Portsmouth, Plymouth and Faslane. It comprises:

- A Squadron (formerly Tactical Diving Group) Special operations squadron - Horsea Island, Portsmouth.
- B Squadron (formerly Southern Diving Group) Homeland Defence in support of Op Tapestry and IWMAR diving to SURFLOT, geographically distributed between Horsea Island, Portsmouth and HMNB Devonport
- C Squadron (formerly Northern Diving Group) Homeland Defence in support of Op Tapestry and IWMAR diving to SUBFLOT, located in HMNB Clyde.
- D Squadron (formerly Expeditionary Diving Group) MTG, LRG / JEF(M) facing, located at Horsea Island, Portsmouth.
- E Squadron (Explosive exploitation) Horsea Island, Portsmouth, with options to disperse force elements to HMNB Clyde and Devonport.

=== North America ===
- Canada: Canadian Clearance Diver https://www.canada.ca/en/navy/corporate/fleet-units/specialized-units/clearance-divers.html
- US:
  - Underwater Demolition Team - US Navy, 1943–1967
  - Navy EOD, 1941–Present. In 1941 Draper Kauffman established the U.S. Naval Mine School at Naval Gun Factory in Washington, D.C., and subsequently the Bomb Disposal School was established. In 1943, Kauffman selected men from the EOD school to create the Naval Combat Demolition Units (NCDU) teams that would take part in the landing at Normandy. The first U.S. casualty in mine disposal was in 1942, when Ensign John M. Howard was killed when he attempted to dismantle a booby-trapped German magnetic submarine-laid moored mine. About 20 trained bomb and mine disposal personnel, were killed in action during WWII.
  - US Navy Underwater Construction Teams, 1960's - Present

=== Oceania ===
- Australia: The Royal Australian Navy Clearance Diving Branch divers serve as combat divers on tactical operations using oxygen rebreathers, mine counter-measures, and underwater battle damage repair. Work may include underwater searches and salvage, and neutralising explosive devices. Clearance diver qualification is recognised for civilian equivalences with accreditation through the Australian Diver Accreditation Scheme (ADAS) .
- New Zealand: The Royal New Zealand Navy Operational Diving Team (ODT) are clearance divers and also serve as combat divers

== See also ==
- United States military divers – Underwater divers employed by the US armed forces
- Navy diver (United States Navy) – US Navy personnel qualified in underwater diving and salvage
- Underwater Construction Teams – Navy construction battalion underwater construction units
- Explosive ordnance disposal (United States Navy) – US Navy personnel who render safe or detonate unexploded ordnance
- Frogman – Tactical scuba diver
