= Minentaucher =

Mine clearance divers of the German Navy

Minentaucher is the German term for mine clearance divers. The Minentaucherkompanie is a specialist unit within the German Navy responsible for underwater and Land tasks including removing or salvaging underwater munitions such as mines and for servicing underwater drones. It is part of the Sea Battalion and is based in Eckernförde.

Coat of arms of the Minentaucherkompanie

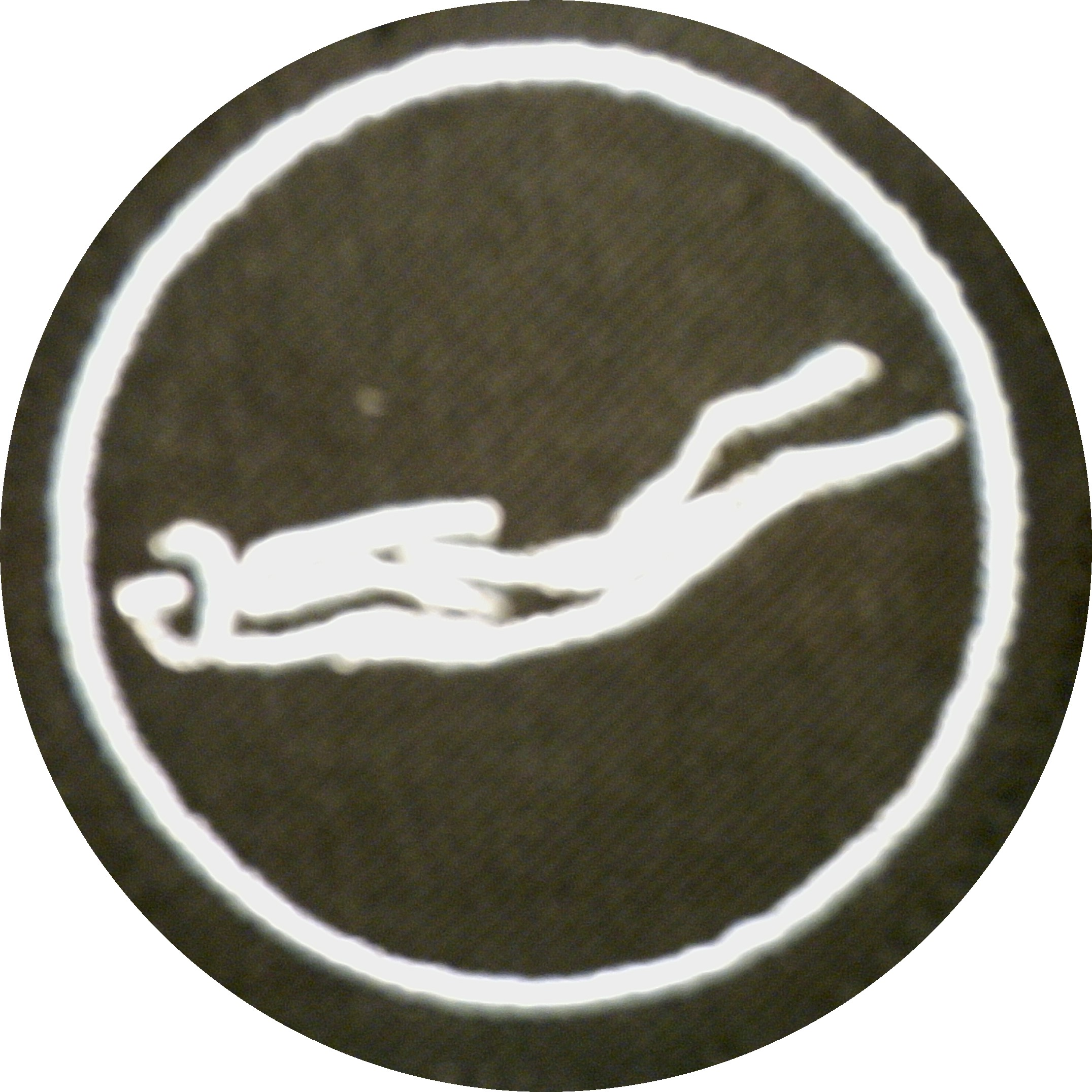
German armed forces diver badge

== Minentaucherkompanie ==
The mine clearance diver company consists of soldiers at its headquarters in Eckenförde and those assigned to various German navy vessels. It primarily operates in German territorial waters such as the Baltic Sea, clearing naval mines and other hazards. It also supports search and recovery operations involving sunken ships, submarines and airplanes. In autumn 1985 the unit saw its first overseas engagement, clearing freshly laid mines in the Suez Canal. It has since served in several parts of the world as a part of NATO military deployments and exercises. Members of the company have also deployed with German special Forces on various Missions. The Unit is currently equipped with the Stealth EOD M for diving, as well as the LAR VII for shallow water operations.

== See also ==
- Clearance Diving Branch (RAN) – Diving unit of the Royal Australian Navy - Australian Navy Clearance Divers
- Underwater Demolition Team – US Navy special operations group - US Navy, 1943–1967
- Minedykkerkommandoen – Norwegian Navy clearance diver unit is Norway's Clearance Diver force.
- Clearance diver – Navy diver specialised in explosives
