= Index of underwater diving: F–K =

Alphabetical listing of underwater diving related topics

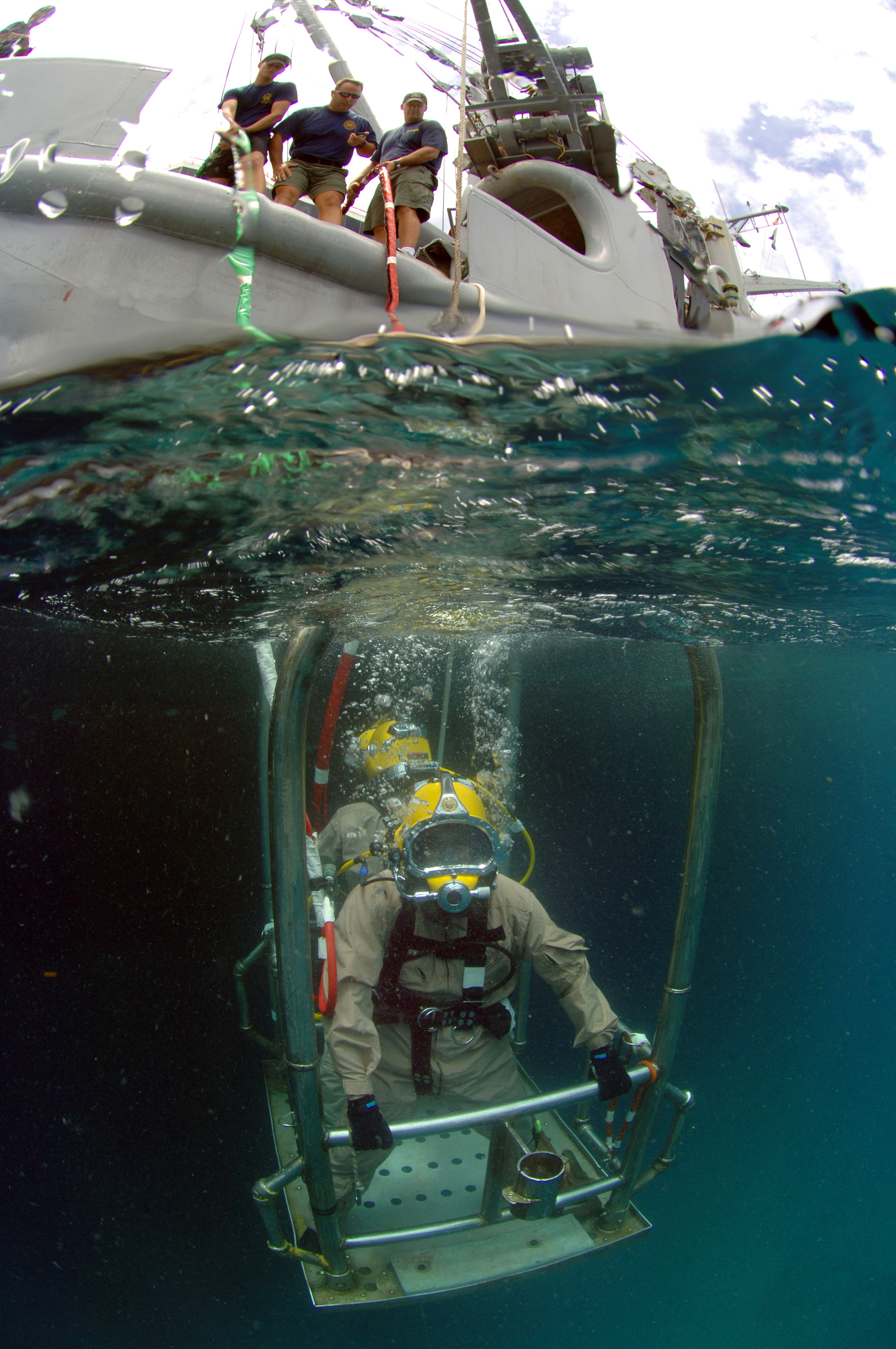
Surface-supplied divers riding a stage to the underwater workplace

The following index is provided as an overview of and topical guide to underwater diving: Links to articles and redirects to sections of articles which provide information on each topic are listed with a short description of the topic. When there is more than one article with information on a topic, the most relevant is usually listed, and it may be cross-linked to further information from the linked page or section.

Underwater diving can be described as all of the following:

- A human activity – intentional, purposive, conscious and subjectively meaningful sequence of actions. Underwater diving is practiced as part of an occupation, or for recreation, where the practitioner submerges below the surface of the water or other liquid for a period which may range between seconds to order of a day at a time, either exposed to the ambient pressure or isolated by a pressure resistant suit, to interact with the underwater environment for pleasure, competitive sport, or as a means to reach a work site for profit or in the pursuit of knowledge, and may use no equipment at all, or a wide range of equipment which may include breathing apparatus, environmental protective clothing, aids to vision, communication, propulsion, maneuverability, buoyancy control and safety equipment, and tools for the task at hand.

There are seven sub-indexes, listed here. The tables of content should link between them automatically:

- Index of underwater diving: A–C
- Index of underwater diving: D–E
- Index of underwater diving: F–K
- Index of underwater diving: L–N
- Index of underwater diving: O–R
- Index of underwater diving: S
- Index of underwater diving: T–Z

== F ==
| Contents: Top | 0–9 | A | B | C | D | E | F | G | H | I | J | K | L | M | N | O | P | Q | R | S | T | U | V | W | X | Y | Z |

Section contents: Top of section, Fa, Fe, Fi, Fl–Fn, Fo, Fr, Fu

=== Fa ===
- Faber Industrie S.p.A., also known as Faber Cylinders – Italian manufacturer of high pressure gas storage cylinders
- Faceplate (diving) – Transparent viewport on the front of a diving helmet or full-face mask
- Fatal scuba diving incidents – Deaths occurring while scuba diving or as a consequence of scuba diving

=== Fe ===
Section contents: Top of section, Fa, Fe, Fi, Fl–Fn, Fo, Fr, Fu

- Feather breathing – Technique for minimising gas loss during some regulator malfunctions
- Federación Española de Actividades Subacuáticas (FEDAS) – Spanish national federation for underwater activities, affiliated to CMAS
- Fédération Française d'Études et de Sports Sous-Marins (FFESSM) – French diver training and certification agency
- Federazione Italiana Attività Subacquee (FIAS) – Italian non-profit recreational diver training organisation affiliated to CMAS
- Feet fresh water – Unit of pressure equal to 1/34 atm.
- Fenzy – French manufacturer of industrial and diving breathing equipment
- Fernez, Maurice – French inventor and pioneer in underwater breathing apparatus
- Ferraro, Luigi – Officer of the Royal Italian Navy and pioneer of Italian submarine warfare

=== Fi ===
Section contents: Top of section, Fa, Fe, Fi, Fl–Fn, Fo, Fr, Fu

- Fibre wound composite cylinder – Pressure vessel with fibre structural reinforcement
- Fick's laws of diffusion – Mathematical descriptions of molecular diffusion
- Fife, William Paul – US Air Force officer and hyperbaric medicine researcher
- Filling whip – High pressure hose for filling compressed gas cylinders
- Fin retainer – Rubber straps for securing swimfins to the feet
- Finning technique – Skills used by divers and surface swimmers using swimfins
- Finswimming – Competitive watersport using swimfins for propulsion
- Finswimming at the 2001 World Games – Competition held in Akita, Japan
- Finswimming at the 2001 World Games – Men's 50 m apnoea – Competition held in Akita, Japan
- Finswimming at the 2005 World Games – Men's 50 m apnoea – Competition held in Duisburg, Germany
- Finswimming at the 2009 Asian Indoor Games – Competition held in Mỹ Đình National Aquatics Sports Complex, Hanoi, Vietnam
- Finswimming at the 2009 World Games – International competition in Kaohsiung
- Finswimming at the 2009 World Games – Men's 50 m apnoea – Event in Kaohsiung, Taiwan
- Finswimming at the 2011 SEA Games – Watersport competition in Palembang, Indonesia
- Finswimming at the 2021 SEA Games – Competition at Mỹ Đình Aquatics Center in Hanoi, Vietnam
- Finswimming at the 2023 SEA Games – Competitions held at Phnom Penh, Cambodia
- Finswimming at the World Games – Trend sport at the World Games
- Finswimming in Australia – Competitive watersport
- Finswimming in the United Kingdom – Competitive watersport
- Finswimming in the United States – Competitive watersport
- Finswimming World Championships – International event for the underwater sport of finswimming
- First aid – Emergency first response medical treatment
- Fischer, George R. – American underwater archaeologist
- Fitness to dive, also known as fitness for diving – Medical fitness to function underwater

=== Fl–Fn ===
Section contents: Top of section, Fa, Fe, Fi, Fl–Fn, Fo, Fr, Fu

- Fleuss, Henry – British inventor of diving equipment (1851 – 1933)
- Flicker fusion threshold – Concept in the psychophysics of vision
- Flood-up valve – Valve to allow gas out of a diving bell so that it can be partially flooded
- Flushing the loop – Rebreather diving safety procedure
- Flying after diving – Precautions against decompression sickness when ascending to altitude after diving
- FNRS-2 – First bathyscaphe
- FNRS-3 – Bathyscaphe of the French Navy

=== Fo ===
Section contents: Top of section, Fa, Fe, Fi, Fl–Fn, Fo, Fr, Fu

- Force – Influence that can change motion of an object
- Formoza Military Unit – Polish Special Forces unit
- Forward dive profile – Repetitive dive shallower than the preceding dive

=== Fr ===
Section contents: Top of section, Fa, Fe, Fi, Fl–Fn, Fo, Fr, Fu

- Fraction of inspired oxygen – Volumetric proportion of oxygen to other constituents in a breathing gas
- Franzén, Anders – Swedish marine technician and amateur naval archaeologist
- Free immersion apnea – Human-powered freediving discipline
- Free-flow diving helmet, also known as free-flow helmet – Helmet which supplies a continuous flow of air to the diver
- Freediving – Underwater diving without breathing apparatus
- Freediving blackout – Loss of consciousness caused by cerebral hypoxia towards the end of a breath-hold dive
- Freediving blackout of ascent – Hypoxic blackout while ascending from a deep breathhold dive
- Freediving computer – Worn unit for monitoring and recording freedive data
- Freediving training agency, also known as freediver training agency – Organisation for training and certifying the competence of freedivers
- Freeflow – Continuous flow of breathing gas in an underwater breathing apparatus
- Free-flow breathing apparatus – Equipment which provides a constant flow of breathing gas
- Free-flow (diving) – Constant flow rate of gas unaffected by breathing rate
- French commando frogmen – Combat swimmer unit of the French Navy
- French Navy Recompression Treatment Table 1 – Recompression protocol for treating decompression sickness
- French Navy Recompression Treatment Table 1A (GERS 1968) – Recompression protocol for treating decompression sickness
- French Navy Recompression Treatment Table 2A (GERS 1968) – Recompression protocol fot treating decompression sickness
- French Navy Recompression Treatment Table 3A (GERS 1968) – Recompression protocol for treating decompression sickness
- French Navy Recompression Treatment Table A (GERS 1968) – Recompression protocol for decompression sickness
- French Navy Recompression Treatment Table B (GERS 1968) – Recompression protocol for treating decompression sickness
- French Navy Recompression Treatment Table C (GERS 1968) – Recompression protocol for treating decompression sickness
- French Navy Recompression Treatment Table D (GERS 1968) – Recompression protocol for treating decompression sickness
- Frenzel maneuver – Ear equalization technique originally developed for dive bomber pilots
- Fresh gas flow (disambiguation) – Gas added to the recycled gas of a rebreather or anesthetic machine
- Freshwater diving – Underwater diving in fresh water
- Freshwater diving environment – Type of underwater diving environment
- Frog kick – Finning propulsion kick used particularly by cave and wreck divers
- Frogman – Tactical scuba diver
- Frogman Corps (Denmark) – Danish maritime special operations unit
- FROGS (Full Range Oxygen Gas System) – Closed circuit oxygen diving rebreather
- fsw (pressure) – Hydrostatic pressure of a water column in terms of depth in feet

=== Fu ===
Section contents: Top of section, Fa, Fe, Fi, Fl–Fn, Fo, Fr, Fu

- Fuerzas Especiales – Special forces unit of the Mexican Navy
- Fukuryu – Japanese divers intended to manually detonate mines on invading ships
- Full-face diving mask – Diving mask that covers the mouth as well as the eyes and nose
- Full facepiece – User respiratory interface with breathing apparatus that covers the nose, mouth and eyes
- Full-face snorkel mask – Breathing apparatus for surface swimming
- Full ocean depth – Maximum known depth in the ocean
- Full penetration wreck diving – Wreck penetration beyond the light zone

== G ==
| Contents: Top | 0–9 | A | B | C | D | E | F | G | H | I | J | K | L | M | N | O | P | Q | R | S | T | U | V | W | X | Y | Z |

Section contents: Top of section, Ga, Ge, Gl, Go–Gp, Gr, Gu, Gy

=== Ga ===
- Gaiters (diving) – Accessories used to restrict volume of a dry suit over the lower legs
- Gap line, also known as jump line – Line laid when crossing a gap between permanent cave lines
- Gas blender – Person who blends breathing gas mixtures for scuba diving and fills diving cylinders
- Gas blender level 1, also known as nitrox blender – Person competent to mix nitrox for scuba divers
- Gas blender level 2, also known as trimix blender – Person competent to mix trimix for scuba divers
- Gas blending – Producing special gas mixtures to specification
- Gas blending for scuba diving – Mixing and filling cylinders with breathing gases for use when scuba diving
- Gas booster – Machine to increase the pressure of compressed gas
- Gas capacity – Amount of gas that can be stored in a container
- Gas cylinder – Cylindrical container for storing pressurised gas
- Gas cylinder bundle, also known as gas cylinder quad – Group of manifolded gas cylinders mounted on a transport frame
- Gas cylinder permanent markings – Information identifying the cylinder and its specification
- Gas diving – Underwater diving using air as the breathing gas
- Gas endurance – The time a gas supply will last
- Gas exchange – Process by which gases diffuse through a biological membrane
- Gas extender – Type of semi-closed circuit diving rebreather
- Gas extender helmet – Diving helmet with integral carbon dioxide scrubber
- Gas-integrated dive computer – A dive computer that displays the pressure of breathing gas remaining in the cylinder
- Gas integration – Facility for a dive computer to display breathing gas cylinder pressures
- Gas laws – Physical laws relates to gases
- Gas man, also known as gas panel operator – Member of a surface-supplied diving team who operates the breathing gas panel
- Gas matching – Ensuring that reserve breathing gas is sufficient to supply the dive buddy
- Gas panel – Breathing gas distribution panel for surface-supplied diving
- Gas panel operator, also known as gas man – Member of a surface-supplied diving team who operates the breathing gas panel
- Gas-reclaim system – Equipment to recover exhaled gas from a diver to save the helium content
- Gas storage bank – Manifolded group of gas storage cylinders
- Gas storage cylinder – Container for storing pressurised gas
- Gas storage quad – Group of similar size high pressure cylinders
- Gas storage tube – Large volume, high pressure gas storage cylinder
- Gas switch – Change of breathing gas mixture during a dive
- Gas switching – Changing the breathing gas mixture during a dive
- Gas toxicity – Dose dependent harmfulness of gases
- Gay-Lussac's law – Relationship between pressure and temperature of a gas at constant volume

=== Ge ===
- German commando frogmen – German commando and amphibious warfare force

=== Gl ===
Section contents: Top of section, Ga, Ge, Gl, Go–Gp, Gr, Gu, Gy

- Global Explorer ROV – Deep water science and survey remotely operated vehicle
- Global Underwater Explorers (GUE) – Recreational/technical scuba training and certification agency
- Glossary of breathing apparatus terminology – Definitions of technical terms used in connection with breathing apparatus
- Glossary of underwater diving terminology, also known as Glossary of underwater diving terms or Glossary of SCUBA diving
- Glossary of underwater diving terminology: A–C
- Glossary of underwater diving terminology: D–G
- Glossary of underwater diving terminology: H–O
- Glossary of underwater diving terminology: P–S – List of terms used in underwater diving and their meanings in context
- Glossary of underwater diving terminology: T–Z

=== Go–Gp ===
Section contents: Top of section, Ga, Ge, Gl, Go–Gp, Gr, Gu, Gy

- Goldfinder – Autobiography of British diver and treasure hunter Keith Jessop
- Gold line (diving) – Permanent main guide line in a cave
- Gold Rush: White Water – American television series
- Goldfish-class ROUV – Light class of Chinese remotely operated underwater vehicle
- Goldman Interconnected Compartment Model – Decompression model proposed by Saul Goldman
- Goodman handle – Mounting which holds a dive light on the back of the diver's hand
- Gorski (diving helmet) – Diving helmet brand owned by Aqualung Group
- GPS sonobuoy, also known as GPS intelligent buoy – Acoustic positioning devices

=== Gr ===
Section contents: Top of section, Ga, Ge, Gl, Go–Gp, Gr, Gu, Gy

- Gradient factor – Method for adjusting conservatism of decompression algorithms
- Gradient factor in decompression modelling – A way for users to adjust the conservatism of a decompression algorithm in software
- Green Fins – Organisation in South East Asia for preservation of coral reefs by improving diver behavior
- GROM Military Unit – Polish special forces unit
- GRUMEC, also known as Brazilian commando frogmen – Brazilian Navy special forces diving unit

=== Gu ===
- Guide line – Line deployed by scuba divers for navigation

=== Gy ===
- Gyrojet – Firearm firing gyroscopic rockets in the 1960s

== H ==
| Contents: Top | 0–9 | A | B | C | D | E | F | G | H | I | J | K | L | M | N | O | P | Q | R | S | T | U | V | W | X | Y | Z |

Section contents: Top of section, Ha–Hb, He, Hi, Ho, Hu, Hy

=== Ha–Hb ===
- Haenyeo – Female divers of Jeju, South Korea
- Halcyon Dive Systems – American manufacturer of diving equipment
- Halcyon PVR-BASC – Semi-closed circuit depth compensated passive addition diving rebreather
- Halcyon RB80 – Non-depth-compensated passive addition semi-closed circuit rebreather
- Haldane, John Scott – British physiologist and decompression researcher (1860–1936)
- Haldane's decompression model – Decompression model developed by John Scott Haldane
- Half + 15 bar – Rule of thumb for scuba gas management
- Half mask – Diving mask covering the nose and eyes
- Half time (physics) – Time for a quantity to decrease by half in an exponential decay process
- Halocline – Stratification of a body of water due to salinity differences
- Hamilton, Robert William Jr. – American physiologist and researcher in hyperbaric physiology.
- Hand-held sonar – Ranging and imaging units for use by divers
- Hand-off a cylinder – Transfer a scuba cylinder from one diver to another in the water
- Hand-off cylinder – Scuba set that can be passed to another diver
- Hang-off profile – Commercial dive profile to limit ingassing during idle periods
- Hans Hass Award – Award in recognition of contribution made to the advancement of knowledge of the ocean
- Hans Hass – Austrian biologist, film-maker, and underwater diving pioneer
- Harasib Cave – Flooded karst cave in Namibia
- Hawaiian In-water Recompression Table – Emergency treatment for decompression sickness
- Hawaiian sling – Simple form of underwater speargun
- Hazard – Situation or object that can cause harm
- Hazard analysis (HAZID) – Method for assessing risk
- Hazard classification – Identification of types of hazard
- Hazard elimination – Hazard control by removing the hazard
- Hazard substitution – Replacing a material or process with a lower risk alternative
- Hazard to navigation – Situation causing risk to air or water navigation
- Hazardous Materials Identification System – Numerical hazard rating using colour coded labels
- Hazards of the aquatic environment – Hazards inherent to being underwater
- Hazards of the diving environment – Dangerous conditions typical of places people dive
- Hazards of the specific diving environment – Factors which vary between diving environments
- Hazmat diver – Professional diver working in hazardous materials environments
- Hazmat diving – Underwater diving in a known hazardous materials environment
- Hazmat diving decontamination – Removing hazardous environmental contaminants from the diver after a dive
- H-BRUV – Horizontally aligned baited remote underwater video

=== He ===
Section contents: Top of section, Ha–Hb, He, Hi, Ho, Hu, Hy

- Health and Safety Executive (HSE) – United Kingdom government agency
- Healthways (scuba gear company) – Defunct firm which made scuba gear
- Heckler & Koch P11 – Five-barreled underwater rocket dart pistol
- Heinke (diving equipment manufacturer) – British manufacturer of diving equipment
- HeinrichsWeikamp – German manufacturer of dive computers and other electronics for recreational diving
- Helgoland Habitat – Ambient pressure underwater habitat
- Heliair – Breathing gas mixed from air and helium
- Helicopter Aircrew Breathing Device, also known as helicopter escape set – Small scuba device for escape from ditched helicopters
- Helicopter turn – Rotation about a vertical axis by an underwater diver using only fins
- Heliox – Breathing gas mixed from helium and oxygen
- Heliox diving – Use of helium/oxygen breathing gas mix in underwater diving
- Helium analyzer, also known as helium analyser – Instrument to measure the concentration of helium in a gas mixture
- Helium reclaim system – System to recover used breathing gas and prepare it for re-use
- Helium release valve – Feature on some watches for saturation diving
- Helium speech unscrambler – Technology for reducing hyperbaric speech distortion
- Helium tremors – Disorder from breathing helium based gas
- Helix Energy Solutions Group – Provider of offshore services and ROV operations
- Helmet squeeze – Injury caused low pressure in diving helmet
- Helmet weight – Ballast added to a diving helmet to prevent it from floating
- Hempleman, Henry Valence – British decompression researcher
- Henry's law – Gas law regarding proportionality of dissolved gas

=== Hi ===
Section contents: Top of section, Ha–Hb, He, Hi, Ho, Hu, Hy

- Hierarchy of hazard controls – System used in industry to eliminate or minimize exposure to hazards
- High energy coast – Shoreline exposed to high energy waves
- High energy underwater environment – Underwater environment with high kinetic energy of the water
- High pressure breathing air compressor – Machine to fill cylinders with atmospheric air at high pressure for breathing
- High-pressure gas storage cylinder, also known as high pressure storage cylinder – Pressure vessel for storage of high pressure gas
- High-pressure nervous syndrome, also known as high-pressure neurological syndrome – Disorder from breathing helium based gas at high ambient pressure
- High-pressure water jetting – Cleaning method using very high pressure water jet
- Hill, Leonard Erskine – British physiologist (1866–1952)
- Hills, Brian Andrew – Physiologist who worked on decompression theory
- History of decompression research and development
- History of dive computers – Development of instruments to calculate decompression status in real time
- History of Diving Museum – Museum of underwater diving in Islamorada, Florida
- History of scuba diving – Origins and development of diving using breathing gas carried by the diver
- History of the diving bell – Development of a type of diving apparatus
- History of underwater diving – Developments over time in the human activity

=== Ho ===
Section contents: Top of section, Ha–Hb, He, Hi, Ho, Hu, Hy

- Hog looped – Scuba regulator long hose configuration
- Hogarthian scuba configuration – Scuba harness arrangement developed by Bill Main
- Hoke valve – Gas recirculation control valve on MK V helium hemet
- Hookah (diving) – Basic surface supplied equipment using an air-line
- Hookah diving – Underwater diving using a basic air hose from the surface
- Hoppe-Seyler, Felix – German physiologist and chemist (1825–1895)
- Hot stab – Type of subsea quick connector for offboard services
- Hot water suit – A wetsuit with a supply of heated water to keep a diver warm
- Hot water system (diving) – Water heating and supply system for hot-water diving suits

=== Hu ===
Section contents: Top of section, Ha–Hb, He, Hi, Ho, Hu, Hy

- Huggins, Karl E. – American decompression researcher
- Human factors in diving equipment design – Influence of the interaction between the user and the equipment on design
- Human factors in diving safety
- Human factors in the design of diving equipment – Influence of the interaction between the user and the equipment on design
- Human physiology of underwater diving, also known as human physiology of diving – Influences of the underwater environment on the physiology of human divers
- Human torpedo – Early form of diver propulsion vehicle

=== Hy ===
Section contents: Top of section, Ha–Hb, He, Hi, Ho, Hu, Hy

- Hydraulic chainsaw – Chainsaw powered by a hydraulic motor
- Hydreliox – Breathing gas mixture of hydrogen, helium, and oxygen
- Hydrocleaning – Use of a water jet for cleaning hard surfaces
- Hydrocyinder – Combined gas cylinder and ballast tank of the Avelo scuba system
- Hydrogen narcosis – Psychotropic state induced by breathing hydrogen at high partial pressures
- Hydrogen sulfide – Poisonous, corrosive and flammable gas
- Hydrophobe – Molecule or surface that has no attraction to water
- HydroSpace Engineering – US manufacturer of decompression computers
- Hydrostatic pressure – The static pressure exerted by the weight of the fluid column above the point
- Hydrostatic test – Non-destructive test of pressure vessels
- Hydrox (breathing gas) – Breathing gas mixture experimentally used for very deep diving
- Hyperbaric chamber treatment schedules – Recompression chamber protocols for treating decompression sickness
- Hyperbaric escape capsule – Small hyperbaric evacuation unit that drifts until rescued
- Hyperbaric evacuation – Emergency transport of people in a hyperbaric chamber
- Hyperbaric evacuation and rescue – Emergency transport of divers under a decompression obligation to a place of safety
- Hyperbaric evacuation facilities – Systems to evacuate saturation divers in an emergency
- Hyperbaric evacuation system – Equipment for emergency transport of divers under pressure to a place of safety
- Hyperbaric evacuation unit – Pressure vessel in which divers are transported under pressure in an emergency
- Hyperbaric lifeboat – Lifeboat for transporting people under pressure
- Hyperbaric medicine – Medical treatment at raised ambient pressure
- Hyperbaric nursing – Nursing specialty in hyperbaric oxygen therapy
- Hyperbaric oxygen therapy chamber – Pressure vessel for human occupancy used in hyperbatic medicine
- Hyperbaric oxygen treatment – Medical oxygen treatment at raised pressure
- Hyperbaric oxygen treatment table – Planned hyperbaric exposure using oxygen breathing gas as medical treatment
- Hyperbaric reception facility – Saturation facility on standby in case evacuation is necessary
- Hyperbaric rescue – Emergency transport of people in a hyperbaric chamber
- Hyperbaric rescue chamber – Hyperbaric chamber suitable for emergency transport of divers under pressure
- Hyperbaric rescue vessel – Ship to recover hyperbaric evacuation units
- Hyperbaric speech distortion – Speech distortion at high ambient pressure
- Hyperbaric stretcher – Portable pressure vessel to transport a person under pressure
- Hyperbaric transport – Transportation under pressure greater than atmospheric
- Hyperbaric transportation – Transport under pressure greater than atmospheric
- Hyperbaric treatment – Medical treatment at raised ambient pressure
- Hyperbaric treatment gas – Breathing gases used in hyperbaric medicine
- Hyperbaric treatment schedules – Planned hyperbaric exposure using a specified breathing gas as medical treatment
- Hyperbaric treatment tables – Planned hyperbaric exposure using a specified breathing gas as medical treatment
- Hyperbaric viewport – Window on a pressure vessel
- Hyperbaric welding – Welding metal at elevated pressure
- Hypercapnia – Abnormally high tissue carbon dioxide levels
- Hyperoxia – Exposure of tissues to abnormally high concentrations of oxygen
- Hyperoxic breathing gas – Gas mixture with higher oxygen content than air
- Hyperoxic myopia – Short sightedness caused by exposure to high oxygen concentrations
- Hyperthermia – Elevated body temperature due to failed thermoregulation
- Hyperventilation – Excessive breathing
- Hyperventilation-induced blackout – Loss of consciousness caused by cerebral hypoxia towards the end of a breath-hold dive
- Hypobaric decompression – Reduction in pressure to lower than normal sea level atmospheric pressure
- Hypocapnia – State of reduced carbon dioxide in the blood
- Hypothermia – Human body core temperature below 35 °C (95 °F)
- Hypoventilation – Insufficient breathing
- Hypoxia (medicine) – Medical condition of lack of oxygen in the tissues
- Hypoxia of ascent – Loss of cosciousness during ascent from a breathhold dive
- Hypoxic blackout – Loss of consciousness due to cerebral hypoxia
- Hypoxic breathing gas – Gas mixture with lower oxygen content than air
- Hypoxic trimix – Gas mixture of helium, nitrogen and insufficient oxygen to safely breathe at surface pressure
- Hypoxic trimix diver – Recreational technical diving certification level

== I ==
| Contents: Top | 0–9 | A | B | C | D | E | F | G | H | I | J | K | L | M | N | O | P | Q | R | S | T | U | V | W | X | Y | Z |

Section contents: Top of section, Ic, Id, Im, In, Ir–Is, It

=== Ic ===
- Ice diving – Underwater diving under ice
- Ichthyander Project – Soviet underwater habitat project of the 1960s
- Ictineu 3 – Crewed submersible

=== Id ===
Section contents: Top of section, Ic, Id, Im, In, Ir–Is, It

- IDA71 – Russian military rebreather for underwater and high altitude use
- Ideal gas law – Equation of the state of a hypothetical ideal gas
- IDRCF – International Diving Regulators and Certifiers Forum

=== Im ===
Section contents: Top of section, Ic, Id, Im, In, Ir–Is, It

- IMCA – International trade association for the marine contracting industry
- IMCA Code of Practice for Offshore Diving, also known as IMCA D014 – Guidance document for member organisations
- IMCA Diving Supervisor's Manual, also known as IMCA D022 – Procedures endorsed by IMCA for offshore diving operations
- IMCA Safety flash – Anonymised incident reports
- Immersion finswimming – Competitive scuba watersport using swimfins for propulsion
- Immersion finswimming with breathing apparatus – Competitive scuba watersport using swimfins for propulsion
- Immersion pulmonary oedema – Body fluid accumulated in the lungs due to immersion in a liquid
- Immersion response – The physiological responses to immersion of air-breathing vertebrates

=== In ===
Section contents: Top of section, Ic, Id, Im, In, Ir–Is, It

- Incident pit – Conceptual model for explaining incident development and recovery
- Independent doubles, also known as independent twin cylinders – Two fully redundant back-mounted scuba sets with no cross-connection
- Index of recreational dive sites – Alphabetical listing of articles on porular places for recreational diving
- Index of underwater divers – Alphabetical listing of articles about underwater divers
- Index of underwater diving – Alphabetical listings of underwater diving related topics
- Industrie Werke Karlsruhe Aktiengesellschaft (IWKA) – German manufacturer of seamless steel gas cylinders
- Inert gas counterdiffusion – Diffusion of one inert gas into body tissues while another inert gas is diffusing out
- Ingassing – Uptake of gases by biological tissues
- Inherent unsaturation – Physiological effect of oxygen metabolism on the total dissolved gas concentration in venous blood
- Inland dive site – Sites in bodies of water inland of the sea coastline
- Inland diving – Diving in waters inland of the coastal high water mark.
- Inner ear barotrauma – Pressure injury to the inner ear
- Inner ear decompression sickness – Medical condition caused by inert gas bubbles forming out of solution
- Inshore diving – Diving in coastal territorial waters
- Instinctive drowning response – Instinctive reaction that occurs in humans when close to drowning
- Insulán, Stig – Inventor of an adjustable automatic exhaust valve for variable volume dry suits
- Integrated Diver Display Mask – Diving half-mask with integrated head-up instrument display
- Integrated DV/BC inflator unit – BCD inflator mechanism combined with scuba demand valve
- Integrated weight system – Diver weights carried on the buoyancy compensator or safety harness
- Integrated weights – Diving weights carried in pockets on the buoyancy compensator
- Intelligent Water class AUV – Autonomous underwater vehicle for the People's Liberation Army Navy
- Intermediate decompression – Decompression to a lesser saturation storage depth
- International Association for Handicapped Divers (IAHD) – Non-profit organisation based in the Netherlands
- International Association of Nitrox and Technical Divers (IANTD) – Recreational and technical scuba training and certification agency
- International Bluewater Spearfishing Records Committee – Committee of special interest
- International Coral Reef Society – Non-profit scientific society
- International Divers Alert Network – Independently administered nonprofit DAN regional organizations
- International Diving Institute – American commercial diver training school
- International Diving Regulators and Certifiers Forum (IDRCF), also known as International Diving Regulators Forum – International forum of professional diver accreditation organisations
- International Diving Schools Association (IDSA) – Organisation to develop common standards for commercial diver training
- International Life Saving Federation – Umbrella organization of the national lifesaving organizations
- International Marine Contractors Association (IMCA) – International trade association for the marine contracting industry
- International Organization for Standardization (ISO) – International standards development organization
- International Scuba Diving Hall of Fame – Annual event recognizing recreational scuba industry contributors
- International Submarine Escape and Rescue Liaison Office – Organization coordinating submarine search-and-rescue operations
- International Underwater Cave Rescue and Recovery – Cave diving rescue/recovery organization
- Interspiro – Swedish manufacturer of breathing apparatus
- Interspiro DCSC – Military semi-closed circuit passive addition diving rebreather
- Intervention AUV – Type of autonomous underwater vehicle capable of autonomous interventions
- Intestinal squeeze – Injury to intestines by expanding gas during decompression
- Introductory diving – Non-certification scuba diving experience
- Introductory scuba experience – Non-certification scuba diving experience
- Investigation of diving accidents – Forensic investigation of underwater diving accidents
- In-water cleaning – Methods of removing contaminants from underwater surfaces
- In-water recompression – In-water treatment for decompression sickness
- In-water recompression – In-water treatment for decompression sickness
- In-water recompression schedules – Emergency recompression protocols for treating decompression sickness
- In-water surface cleaning – Methods of removing contaminants from underwater surfaces

=== Ir–Is ===
Section contents: Top of section, Ic, Id, Im, In, Ir–Is, It

- iRobot Seaglider – Deep diving autonomous underwater vehicle for long term missions
- iSimangaliso Marine Protected Area – Marine conservation area in northern kwaZulu-Natal in South Africa
- Isobaric counterdiffusion – Gaseous diffusion through body tissue at constant total pressure
- Isolation manifold – Upstream scuba manifold with a shut-off valve
- Isolation-manifolded twin cylinders, also known as isolation-manifolded twin set – Scuba set with two back-mounted cylinders connected by a manifold with an isolation valve
- ISO 24801 Recreational diving services — Requirements for the training of recreational scuba divers – International training standards for recreational scuba
- ISO recreational diving standard – International standards for recreational diver competence
- ISO recreational diving training standards – Publications of the International Standards Organisation
- Israeli Diving Federation (TIDF) – Israeli recreational diver training and certification agency

=== It ===
- Italian auxiliary ship Olterra – Undercover Italian auxiliary ship from World War II

== J ==
| Contents: Top | 0–9 | A | B | C | D | E | F | G | H | I | J | K | L | M | N | O | P | Q | R | S | T | U | V | W | X | Y | Z |

- Jacket harness – Type of surface-supplied diving safety harness
- Jackstay – Substantial line between two points used to guide or support
- Jackstay (diving) – Substantial underwater guide line
- Jackstay search – Underwater search along a laid down line
- Jagdkommando – Austrian Armed Forces' Special Operations group
- JAGO (German research submersible) – Crewed German research submersible
- Jednostka Wojskowa Komandosów, also known as Commandos Military Unit – Polish special forces unit
- Jersey upline – A buoyed line serving as a position control during decompression
- Jetsam Technologies – Manufacturer of manual closed circuit rebreathers
- JIM suit – Type of atmospheric diving suit
- Job safety analysis (JSA) – Procedure to integrate safety practices into a particular task
- Jocking harness, also known as jocking strap – System to manage buoyancy of a diver's helmet
- Johnson Sea Link accident – Manned submersible incident in which two divers died
- Jonline – A short line used by scuba divers to clip themselves to something
- Josef Heiser – Austrian manufacturer of seamless steel gas cylinders
- Jump camera – Camera triggered by landing on the bottom of a body of water
- Jump jacket – Surface-supplied diving safety harness with buoyancy compensation
- Jump line, also known as gap line – Line laid when crossing a gap between permanent cave lines
- Jump spool – Diving navigation and safety equipment
- Junior Open Water Diver – Entry level scuba certification for ages 10 to 14
- Just culture – Balanced accountability for both individuals and the organization
- J-valve – Type of scuba cylinder valve with reserve lever

== K ==
| Contents: Top | 0–9 | A | B | C | D | E | F | G | H | I | J | K | L | M | N | O | P | Q | R | S | T | U | V | W | X | Y | Z |

- Kaikō ROV – Japanese remotely operated underwater vehicle for deep sea exploration
- Kaşif ROUV – Turkish remotely operated underwater vehicle
- Klingert, Karl Heinrich – German mechanic and inventor of an early surface-supplied diving suit
- Karst Underwater Research – Non-profit organization that specializes in the research and documentation of karst aquifers
- Kayak diving – Recreational diving from a canoe or kayak
- Keel weight (diving) – Weight added to a diver's backplate
- Kelly (gas storage) – Large volume high pressure gas storage tubes
- Kilsby sinkhole – Sinkhole in Mount Gambier, Southern Australia
- Kimiuo Aisek Memorial Museum – Museum in Chuuk State, Federated States of Micronesia
- KISS Classic – Back mount manually controlled closed circuit rebreather
- KISS GEM – Back mount semi-closed circuit rebreather
- KISS Rebreathers – Brand of recreational diving rebreathers
- KISS Sidekick – Side mount manually controlled closed circuit or semi-closed circuit rebreather
- KISS Sidewinder – Symmetrical side mount manually controlled closed circuit rebreather
- Kiss Spirit – Lightweight back mount manually controlled closed circuit rebreather
- KISS (rebreather) – Manufacturer of recreational/technical mixed gas rebreathers
- Kommando Spezialkräfte Marine, also known as Kampfschwimmer – German commando and amphibious warfare force
- Kongsberg Mesotech – Manufacturer of sonar equipment for underwater imaging and detection
- Konsul-class submersible – Russian Navy deep sea submergence vehicle
- KOPASKA – Indonesian Navy special operations and demolition unit
- Kreeft, Peter – German inventor and diver
- Kronan (ship) – Swedish Navy ship of the 1670s
- Kursk submarine disaster salvage operation – Raising the wreck of a Russian nuclear submarine
- K-valve – Plain single outlet scuba cylinder valve

| Contents: Top | 0–9 | A | B | C | D | E | F | G | H | I | J | K | L | M | N | O | P | Q | R | S | T | U | V | W | X | Y | Z |

== See also ==
- Glossary of underwater diving terminology
