= List of diving equipment manufacturers =

Diving equipment, or underwater diving equipment, is equipment used by underwater divers to make diving activities possible, easier, safer and/or more comfortable. This may be equipment primarily intended for this purpose, or equipment intended for other purposes which is found to be suitable for diving use. This is a list of manufacturers of equipment specifically intended for use for underwater diving, though they may also manufacture equipment for other applications

The fundamental item of diving equipment used by divers other than freedivers, is underwater breathing apparatus, such as scuba equipment, and surface-supplied diving equipment, but there are other important items of equipment that make diving safer, more convenient or more efficient. Diving equipment used by recreational scuba divers, also known as scuba gear, is mostly personal equipment carried by the diver, but professional divers, particularly when operating in the surface-supplied or saturation mode, use a large amount of diving support equipment not carried by the diver.

Equipment which is used for underwater work or other activities which is not directly related to the activity of diving, or which has not been designed or modified specifically for underwater use by divers is generally not considered to be diving equipment.

The list is laid out alphabetical order and lists types of diving equipment manufactured and brand names associated with each entity. Several brands were originally the names of independent manufacturers, which have subsequently changed ownership, and may be listed both as a brand and a manufacturer. Some manufacturers were only active for a few years, and some changed their name and brands several times. There are a few which accumulated others by mergers and purchases, and consequently own a large number of brands, some of which may then quietly disappear from the market.

== A ==
- Advanced Diving Equipment Company – American manufacturer of surface supplied diving helmets – Swindell free-flow open circuit air helmets.
- Aeris (dive gear) – American brand of scuba equipment Originally a brand of American Underwater Products, founded in 1998, and merged into a sister-brand, Oceanic, in 2014. Aeris brand covered a wide range of recreational scuba equipment, including regulators, dive computers, buoyancy compensators, harnesses, masks, fins, and snorkels.
- Aerotec Industries Inc. Norseman scuba regulators.
- Aer-Sub, also known as Spiro-Sub – Branding used by Cressi-Sub for scuba equipment Trademarks used by Cressi-sub.
- Erik Andersson (diving equipment) – Swedish manufacturer of standard diving equipment of Stockholm, Sweden – Standard diving dress.
- AP Diving, also known as AP Valves – British manufacturer of underwater diving equipment – Inspiration rebreathers, Buddy and Commando buoyancy compensators, Mk IV Jump Jacket.
- Apeks – British manufacturer of scuba diving equipment – Scuba regulators, buoyancy compensators, harnesses, masks, fins, lights, diving suits and accessories. Acquired by AquaLung in 1997.
- Apollo (dive gear) Scuba masks, fins, diver propulsion vehicles, dive lights.
- Apple – American multinational technology company – Dive computers.
- AQA (dive gear) (Japan). Fins, snorkels, boots, gloves, and wet suits.
- Aquala, also known as Bel-Aqua – US Maudacturer of dry suits.
- Aqua Lung America – American company manufacturing recreational diving equipment
- Aqualung Group, also known as Aqua Lung International, La Spirotechnique – French company manufacturing breathing apparatus and diving equipment
- Aqwary – Dive computers.
- L.G. Arpin Company Divair scuba regulators.
- Atmos – Dive computers.
- Atomic aquatics – Scuba regulators, masks, swimfins.
- Audaxpro Buoyancy compensators.
- Avelo (diving system) – Variable density scuba buoyancy control system – Integrated scuba cylinder and buoyancy compensator.
- Avesta Jernverks AB – Swedish manufacturer of seamless steel gas cylinders (Sweden) Steel diving cylinders.
- Avon Protection – British manufacturing company

== B ==
- Barakuda (dive equipment) – (Germany). Scuba regulators (Delphin), wetsuits.
- Bare (dive gear) Wetsuits, dry suits, masks, fins. Acquired by Huish Outdoors in 2011
- Benemec Oy – Manufacturer of dive computers, Dive computers. marketed by A.P.Valves (Buddy) and Mares
- Beuchat – French manufacturer of underwater diving equipment
- Bigblue Dive Lights
- Bikkers – Dutch manufacturer of standard diving equipment of Rotterdam, Netherlands. Standard diving equipment
- BioMarine – American manufacturer of diving rebreathers
- Bism – Japanese manufacturer and distributor of scuba equipment.
- Body Glove – American brand of watersports clothing – Wetsuits
- Britmarine – British brand of rubber diving equipment manufactured by W.W. Haffenden.

== C ==
- C.E. Heinke & Co. Ltd. – British manufacturer of diving equipment
- Carleton Life Support – Subsidiary of Cobham based in Davenport, Iowa
- Emil Carlsson of Stockholm, Sweden: Standard diving equipment.
- Catalina Cylinders – American manufacturer of aluminum gas cylinders. Aluminium diving cylinders.
- Cavalero-Champion – French manufacturer of underwater diving equipment. Acquired by Beuchat 1992, Spearguns, swimfins, half-masks.
- Cis-Lunar – Manufacturer of electronically controlled closed-circuit rebreathers for scuba diving
- Citizen Watch – Japanese precision-equipment manufacturer – Dive computers and diving watches.
- Clouth Gummiwerke AG of Cöln Nippes, Germany – Standard diving equipment.
- Cobham Limited – British defense industry manufacturing company – Military rebreathers
- Cochran Undersea Technology (Cochran) was the supplier of dive computers to the US Navy. They were programmed with US Navy specified algorithm based on the Thalmann algorithm. Cochran has closed down after the death of the founder, and the US Navy has been using Shearwater Research computers programmed with the decompression model specified by the Navy since then.
- Composite-Beat Engel – Swiss manufacturer of composite helmets – Lightweight demand diving helmets, umbilical reels.
- Cressi-Sub – Italian manufacturer of water sports equipment – Scuba, snorkel, and spearfishing equipment.

== D ==
- Dacor (scuba diving) – Former American diving equipment manufacturer. Buoyancy compensators. Scuba regulators, cylinder valves. Acquired by Mares.
- John Date, of Montreal, Canada – Standard diving equipment
- Deep 6 – Dive computers.
- Deepblu – Manufacturer of dive computers
- Deep See – Acquired by Aqua Lung in 1992 – Fins, masks, snorkels.
- Deepoid – Dive computers.
- Delta P Technology – Technical dive computer manufacturer – (VR2)
- Demone Manufacturing Company – Scuba regulators, cylinder valves. (historical)
- DESCO, also known as Diving Equipment and Supply Company Inc. – American manufacturer of commercial diving equipment – Surface supplied and scuba equipment, standard diving equipment. shallow water helmets.
- Divecomputer.eu – Dive computers.
- Divematics USA Inc. – Manufacturer of Widolf full-face diving masks since 1980.
- Divenav – Dive computers.
- Dive Rite marketed the first commercially manufactured backplates in 1984, and a wing for diving twin cylinders in 1985. Back mount and sidemount harnesses, O_{2}PTIMA electronically controlled closed-circuit rebreathers
- Diveroid – Dive computers.
- Divesoft – Manufacturer of diving rebreathers and accessories. Liberty rebreathers, Freedom dive computers.
- DiveTek
- Dive Xtras – US manufacturer of diver propulsion vehicles
- Divex, also known as James Fisher and sons Plc – Scottish provider of diving equipment and related services – free-flow helmet AH5. Cowan recompression chambers.
- Diving Unlimited International (DUI) – American manufacturer of dry suits and other diving equipment
- Dräger (company) – German manufacturer of breathing equipment. Dräger & Gerling, Lubeck, Germany: Established 1889. In 1902 name changed to Drägerwerk, Heinr. & Bernh. Dräger. Draegerwerk produced both rebreather and free-flow standard diving helmets.
- Drass-Galeazzi – Italian manufacturer of lightweight diving helmets – Italian diving equipment manufacturer. Lightweight diving helmets.
- Dunlop Rubber – British multinational company manufacturing natural rubber goods – Manufacturer of swimfins during WWII.
- The Dutch Diving Helmet – Shallow water diving helmets.

== E ==
- E. T. Skinner & Co. Ltd British manufacturer of fins, masks etc. founded by Oscar Gugen, later became Typhoon International, manufacturer of dry suits.
- Easydive srl - Italian manufacturer founded in 2000, specializing in underwater housings for smartphones and action cameras. It also produces lighting systems and accessories for underwater imaging. Easydive pioneered electronic universal housings for DSLR and mirrorless cameras. This innovation allows multiple camera models to be used in a single housing, reducing waste and cost.
- Eterne – Shallow water helmets.
- Eurocylinder Systems AG – German manufacturer of seamless steel pressure cylinders for gas (Apolda, Germany) Steel diving cylinders.

== F ==
- Faber Industrie SpA – Italian manufacturer of seamless steel and composite pressure cylinders for gas (Cividale del Friuli, Italy) Steel diving cylinders.
- Favre-Leuba – Swiss watch manufacturer
- Farallon (DPV) Diver propulsion vehicles.
- Fenzy – French manufacturer of industrial and diving breathing equipment. Acquired by Aqualung 1976.
- Maurice Fernez – French inventor and pioneer in underwater breathing apparatus
- Luigi Ferraro – Officer of the Royal Italian Navy and pioneer of Italian submarine warfare
- James Fisher and Sons plc, also known as Divex – British provider of marine engineering services – ANSTI test equipment, commercial and defence diving equipment, recompression chambers, saturation systems, submarine rescue equipment, hyperbaric reception facilities.
- FitzWright Company Ltd., Subsidiary of Bare Sportswear Corp, Wetsuits and dry suits.
- Fourth Element Dry suits and wetsuits.
- Friedrich Flohr, Kiel, Germany: Established 1890. Manufactured apparatus of Denayrouze type with three-bolt helmets and regulator backpacks. Later also produced free-flow helmets.

== G ==
- Galeazzi of La Spezia, Italy: Standard diving equipment (including helmets for mixed gas), see also Drass-Galeazzi
- Garmin – Multinational technology company. Dive computers.
- The Garrett Corporation Northill Air-Lung and Air-Mite brand scuba regulators.
- General Aquadyne Inc. of Santa Barbara, California – AH-2 helmet, DM-4 to DM-6 band masks. The AH series helmet was continued by Divex.
- Gorski – Diving helmet brand owned by Aqualung Group – Brand of lightweight demand diving helmet. Manufactured by Aqua Lung.

== H ==
- W.W. Haffenden Former British manufacturer of diving equipment. Brand "Britmarine".
- Halcyon Dive Systems – American manufacturer of diving equipment Rebreathers, dive lights, regulators, buoyancy compensators.
- L.G. Hammond, Miami. FLA – Shallow water helmets
- Hardsuits international. Hardsuit atmospheric diving suit.
- Healthways (scuba gear company) – Defunct firm which made scuba gear. Healthways is now owned by Johnson Outdoors. Scuba Deluxe, Scubair regulators
- Heinke (diving equipment manufacturer) – British manufacturer of diving equipment. Acquired by Siebe Gorman in 196i. Standard diving equipment.
- HeinrichsWeikamp – German manufacturer of dive computers and other electronics for recreational diving. Open-source software dive computers.
- Heliox Technologies – Dive computers.
- Henderson (wetsuits)
- J. C. Higgins – Sporting goods sellers. Mail order distributor
- Hollis (dive gear)
- HTM Sports: Dive computers marketed under Dacor and Mares labels.
- Huawei – Chinese multinational technology company – Dive computers.
- Hulett Cylinders (South Africa) Aluminium diving cylinders.(historical)
- HydroSpace Engineering(HSE) Dive computers.

== I ==
- IAC (dive gear), Italy: Standard diving equipment
- Ikelite Underwater housings for cameras
- Industrie Werke Karlsruhe Aktiengesellschaft (IWKA) – German manufacturer of seamless steel gas cylinders (Germany)(historical)
- Interspiro – Swedish manufacturer of breathing apparatus. Divator full-face masks, scuba regulators, buoyancy compensators, military rebreathers.

== J ==
- Jetsam Technologies – Manufacturer of manual closed circuit rebreathers (KISS range of rebreathers)
- Johnson Outdoors – Producer of outdoor recreational products, with several brand names (Scubapro, Uwatec)
- Josef Heiser – Austrian manufacturer of seamless steel gas cylinders (Austria), now Worthington Cylinders GesmbH.
- Juergensen Defense Corporation Electronic rebreather control systems (Hammerhead)

== K ==
- Kawasaki (dive gear). Japanese manufacturer of scuba regulators.
- Kimura (Nagasaki iron works), Japen: Standard diving equipment
- Kinugawa Co. Ltd, also known as Kinugawa Group, Kinugawa Rubber. Japanese diving equipment manufacturer: Brand names Cocoloa, Gull, AQA. Masks, fins, wetsuits.
- Kirby Morgan – Brand of underwater diving equipment. Lightweight demand helmets, band masks, full-face masks, gas distribution panels, regulators.

== L ==
- Lavacore Exposure protection clothing.
- Light Monkey Lights, guideline, reels, spools, harness and BCDs, helmets, dry suit accessories, cylinder accessories.
- Linde Werdelin – Swiss-Danish watchmaker – Dive computers.
- C.A. Lindqvist of Stockholm, Sweden: Standard diving equipment.
- Liquivision Dive computers. Acquired by American Underwater Products in 2014. No longer in production.
- Loosco, also known as G.L. Loos & Co. Fabrieken NV Amsterdam, Netherlands. Manufacturer of scuba breathing equipment. "Dive safe".
- Luxfer, also known as Luxfer Gas Cylinders – Multinational manufacturer of seamless aluminium pressure vessels (United Kingdom, United States, France) (They announced in 2021 they are leaving the aluminum production market in the US.) Aluminium diving cylinders. Luxfer Gas Cylinders is based in Riverside, California, and has manufacturing facilities in the U.S., England, Canada, China and India.

== M ==
- Mares (scuba equipment), also known as Mares, S.P.a – Italian manufacturer of underwater diving equipment. Scuba regulators, buoyancy compensators, swimfins.
- Medi (diving equipment), East Germany – 3-bolt helmets
- Marinverkst of Karlskrona, Sweden –Standard diving equipment.
- McLean – Dive computers.
- Mercury Products, Billingshurst, UK. SDBA (Special Duty Oxygen Breathing Apparatus)
- Miller-Dunn Diving Co. of Miami, Florida – Standard diving equipment, shallow water helmets.
- Morse Diving, also known as Morse Diving International, A J Morse and Son. – American manufacturer of diving equipment – Standard diving equipment. shallow water helmets.

== N ==
- Nemrod – Spanish manufacturer of scuba and spearfishing equipment. Spain: Scuba regulators, cylinder valves. Standard diving equipment spearguns, "Seamless" brand,
- Neufeldt and Kuhnke. Atmospheric diving suits.
- Normalair Ltd. Scuba sets.
- Norris cylinders Breathing gas cylinders
- Northern Diver International Ltd Dry suits, hot water suits, thermal undersuits, commercial harnesses. rescue equipment.
- Nuytco Research – Manufacturer of atmospheric diving suits, Vancouver, Atmospheric diving suits: Newtsuit and Exosuit

== O ==
- Ocean Management Systems GmbH (OMS) – Buoyancy compensators. Acquired by DUI in 2014.
- Oceanic Worldwide – American recreational scuba equipment manufacturer – Scuba regulators, rebreathers and dive computers.
- Ocean Reef Group – Full-face masks.
- Oceans (dive computers). (Oceans S1 Supersonic dive computer)
- Oceanways – Subsidiary of SeaDive, Manufacturer of snorkelling equipment (masks, snorkels, fins).
- Omersub, also known as OMER, or O.M.E.R. – Manufacturer of diving equipment. Acquired by Aqua Lung in 2014. Spearfshing equipment.
- O'Neill (sportswear) – Wetsuits.
- O'Three – (UK) Dry suits, wetsuits, dive suit accessories and thermal undergarments.
- Oxycheq – Manufacturer and distributor of scuba equipment – Backplate and wing buoyancy compensators and tech harness components, scuba gas analysers and components.

== P ==
- Pelagic Pressure Systems – Manufacturer of dive computers. Acquired by Aqua Lung in May 2015, Dive computers.
- Charles Person (Brazil), of São Paulo, Brazil. Standard diving equipment shallow water helmets.
- Pinnacle Wetsuits.
- Pirelli (rebreather) – Oxygen rebreather manufacturer dry suits.
- Porpoise (scuba gear) – Australian scuba manufacturer
- Poseidon Diving Systems – Swedish manufacturer of diving equipment. Dry suits, regulators, compressors, rebreathers.
- Pressed Steel Tank – American manufacturer of seamless steel gas cylinders (United States). Acquired by Norris Cylinders c.1970
- Princeton Tec – Light systems.
- Procean – Dive computers.
- Prosub – Dive computers.
- Pusan diving equipment, Korea – Standard diving equipment.

== R ==
- Bob Ratcliffe (diver) later Ocean Development Corporation – Diving helmets. (Rat hat).
- Ratio Computers – Dive computers.
- Reefnet – Dive computers.
- Rene Sports – Agent for Aqua Lung in the western US. Precursor to US Divers.
- Rene Piel – French diving equipment manufacturer
- Rolex – Swiss watch designer and manufacturer – Diving watches
- Rose Aviation Incorporated – Rose Pro scuba regulators.
- Rouquayrol–Denayrouze, also known as Specialites Mecaniques Reunis, then Societe Charles Petit, eventually Rene Piel – French manufacturer of standard diving equipment and an early demand regulator, France. (several name changes) manufactured both 3-bolt and 12-bolt helmets, and both demand and free-flow air supply systems. Trademarks include Rene Piel of Paris, C H Petit, of Paris.

== S ==
- Santi (dry suits) – Dry suits, undersuits and accessories.
- Salvimar – Dive computers
- Joe Savoie – Diver and inventor of diving helmets. Lightweight helmets.
- Scauda – French manufacturer of standard diving equipment, of Mareilles, France: Standard diving equipment.
- A. Schräder's Son – US Manufacturer of diving equipment of Brooklyn, New York – Standard diving equipment, shallow water helmets.
- Scorpena – Dive computers.
- Scott Aviation Corporation – Hydro-pak full-face scuba sets.
- ScubaForce – SF2 (rebreather) – Back or sidemount ECCR with bellows counterlung.
- Scubapro – Brand of scuba diving equipment – Scuba regulators, fins, lights, dive computers,
- Seacraft (DPV brand), also known as Marine Tech S.A. – Polish manufacturer of diver propulsion vehicles.
- Seac Sub Italian manufacturer of diving equipment for scuba, freediving, spearfishing and snorkelling.
- Seadive – (See Oceanways (brand))
- Seamless Rubber Company – Nemrod scuba regulators.
- Sea Pearls – Acquired by XS Scuba in 2007. Diving weights. fill check pressure gauges
- Seapro – (See Watergill)
- Seaquest (scuba) – Buoyancy compensators. acquired by Aqua Lung in 1990.
- Seasoft Scuba, also known as Watermark Scuba Inc. – Wetsuits, masks, buoyancy compensators, weights.
- Seatec – Buoyancy compensators.
- Sea Trek (diving system) – Sea Trek diving system.
- SeemannSub, also known as Subgear – Acquired by Scubapro in 2007.
- Seiko – Japanese manufacturing company – Dive computers.
- Semperit – Austrian manufacturer of industrial polymer products
- Shearwater Research – Canadian manufacturer of dive computers and rebreather electronics
- Sherwood Scuba – BCDs, regulators, computers, masks, fins, gauges, valves.
- Siebe Gorman – British manufacturer of diving equipment and salvage contractor. London, UK:Standard diving dress.
- SI TECH AB – Dry suit components: valves, glove systems, seals.
- SM Gerzat). now Luxfer, France –Aluminium diving cylinders.
- Snead Co., Jersey City N.J. – Shallow water helmets.
- Snuba – Limited depth airline breathing apparatus towed by the diver
- Società Anonima Lavorazioni Vari Appararecchi di Salvataggio (SALVAS) – Italian manufacturer of salvage and diving equipment, Italy: manufactured mostly military salvage equipment, including diving helmets.
- So-Lo Marx, also known as Skooba Totes – Brand of Totes-Isotoner. Dry suits.
- SPACO (dive gear) US East coast distributor for AuaLung/La Spirotechnique for a few years
- Spearfisherman (company) – American diving equipment manufacturer – Dry suits.
- Spiro-Sub, also known as Aer-Sub – Trademarks used by Cressi-sub.
- Sporasub – Dive computers.–
- Sportsways Inc. – Scuba regulators, cylinder valves.
- Strumenti Ottici Subacquei (SOS) – Mechanical decompression computer
- Subgear, also known as SeemannSub – Scuba regulators.
- Submarine Products – Former British diving equipment manufacturer and distributor
- SUEX – Diver propulsion vehicles, underwater navigation systems.
- Suunto – Finnish manufacturer of compasses, dive computers and sports watches – Dive computers, compasses
- Swindell (diving helmet), also known as Advanced Diving Equipment Company – Free-flow open circuit air helmets. The helmet was invented by George Swindell

== T ==
- Tabata Co. Ltd. Sporting goods manufacturer based in Tokyo, Japan.
- Tatum GmbH – German manufacturer of surface supplied diving equipment. Helmets, harness, gas supply systems.
- Technical Dive Computers (TDC) – Dive computers.
- Technisub – Italian manufacturer of diving equipment.
- Tekna (dive gear)
- Tenaris Dalmine S.p.A., also known as Tenaris, previously Dalmine – Italian manufacturer of steel gas cylinders.
- Thermo (valves), Acquired by XS Scuba in 2009, Taiwanese manufacturer of scuba cylinder valves and manifolds.
- Thunderbird cylinders, also known as Metal Impact – American manufacturer of seamless aluminum gas cylinders (United States).
- Totes Isotoner – American apparel supplier. Low-cost full-length seamless exposure suits.
- TUSA – Scuba equipment manufacturer. Masks, fins, boots, gloves.
- Typhoon International. Dry suits.

== U ==
- Uemis – Dive computers.
- Undersea Breathing Systems – Dive computers.
- Underwater Marine Equipment – Atmospheric diving suits: JIM suit, Wasp (diving suit), SAM suit, JAM suit
- Underwater Technology Center – Dive computers.
- Unique Hydra – Offshore diving equipment
- U.S. Divers – Manufacturer of scuba diving equipment – Scuba regulators, cylinder valves.
- Uwatec – Manufacturer of dive computers. (Switzerland). Acquired by Scubapro in 1997. – Dive computers.

== V ==
- Vítkovice Cylinders a.s. – Czech manufacturer of seamless pressure cylinders for gas (Ostrava, Czechia) Steel diving cylinders.
- Voit, also known as Industrias Voit S.A. de C.V., AMF Voit, and W.J. Voit Rubber Corporation – Sporting goods manufacturer. Former manufacturer of diving equipment, including scuba regulators, cylinder valves, Swimfins, masks, snorkels, spearguns, wetsuits and accessories. Brands "Swimaster", Viking (regulator).
- Viking (scuba regulator) Scuba regulators. Brand of Voit.
- Viking (dry suits) – Swedish brand of diving dry suits Vulcanised rubber dry suits, hot water suits.
- VR Technology – Dive computers (VR3)

== W ==
- Walter Kidde and Co – US manufacturer of seamless aluminum gas cylinders (historical). Aluminium diving cylinders.
- Watergill. Buoyancy compensators (AtPac), scuba regulators.
- Waterproof Diving International AB – Dry suits, wetsuits
- White Stag Manufacturing Company. Scuba regulators, cylinder valves.
- Whites Manufacturing, Canada. Acquired by Aqua Lung in 2010. Dry suits, wetsuits.
- Widolf – Full-face diving masks from 1946. Manufactured by Divematics USA Inc. since 1980.
- Worthington Cylinder Corporation – US manufacturer of seamless steel gas cylinders. Steel diving cylinders.
- Worthington Cylinders GesmbH – Austrian manufacturer of seamless steel pressure cylinders. Steel diving cylinders.

== X ==
- XS Scuba Scuba diving equipment.

== Y ==
- Yokohama Diving Apparatus Company, Japan – Standard diving equipment, including helium rebreather helmet.

== Z ==
- Zeagle, Buoyancy compensators, scuba regulators,
