= Index of underwater diving =

Alphabetical listings of underwater diving related topics

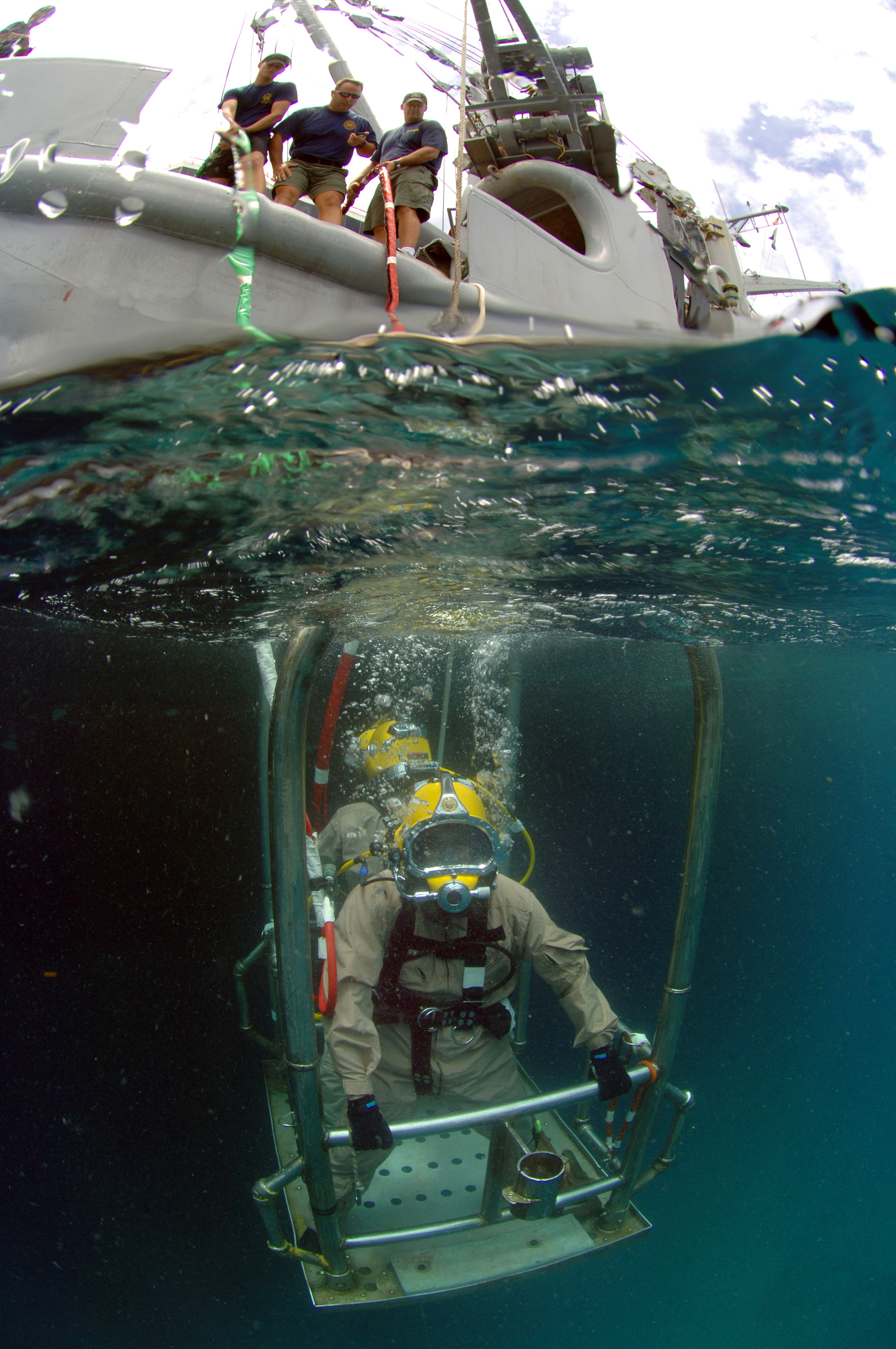
Surface-supplied divers riding a stage to the underwater workplace

The following index is provided as an overview of and topical guide to underwater diving: Links to articles and redirects to sections of articles which provide information on each topic are listed with a short description of the topic. When there is more than one article with information on a topic, the most relevant is usually listed, and it may be cross-linked to further information from the linked page or section.

Underwater diving can be described as all of the following:

- A human activity – intentional, purposive, conscious and subjectively meaningful sequence of actions. Underwater diving is practiced as part of an occupation, or for recreation, where the practitioner submerges below the surface of the water or other liquid for a period which may range between seconds to order of a day at a time, either exposed to the ambient pressure or isolated by a pressure resistant suit, to interact with the underwater environment for pleasure, competitive sport, or as a means to reach a work site for profit or in the pursuit of knowledge, and may use no equipment at all, or a wide range of equipment which may include breathing apparatus, environmental protective clothing, aids to vision, communication, propulsion, maneuverability, buoyancy control and safety equipment, and tools for the task at hand.

There are seven sub-indexes, listed here. The tables of content should link between them automatically:

- Index of underwater diving: A–C
- Index of underwater diving: D–E
- Index of underwater diving: F–K
- Index of underwater diving: L–N
- Index of underwater diving: O–R
- Index of underwater diving: S
- Index of underwater diving: T–Z

Contents: Top	0–9	A	B	C	D	E	F	G	H	I	J	K	L	M	N	O	P	Q	R	S	T	U	V	W	X	Y	Z

== See also ==
- Underwater diving – Descending below the surface of the water to interact with the environment
- Outline of underwater diving – List of articles related to underwater diving grouped by topical relevance
- Glossary of underwater diving terminology
