= Finswimming at the 2001 World Games – Men's 50 m apnoea =

Competition held in Akita, Japan

Finswimming – men's 50 m apnoea at the 2001 World Games
- Venue: Akita Prefectural Pool, Akita, Japan
- Date: 25 August 2001
- Competitors: 18 from 10 nations

Medalists
gold medal	(Russia) Evgeny Skorzhenko
silver medal	(China) Li Yong
bronze medal	(China) Zhao Ji

The men's 50 m apnoea competition in finswimming at the 2001 World Games took place on 25 August 2001 at the Akita Prefectural Pool in Akita, Japan.

== Competition format ==
A total of 18 athletes entered the competition. The best eight athletes from preliminary round qualifies to the final.

== Results ==
=== Preliminary ===
Rank	Athlete	Nation	Time	Note
1	Evgeny Skorzhenko	Russia	14.55	Q
2	Li Yong	China	15.12	Q
3	Zhao Ji	China	15.36	Q
4	Aleksei Viazigin	Russia	15.59	Q
5	Sami Sorri	Finland	15.85	Q
6	Aleksander Polak	Poland	15.93	Q
7	Timo Suominen	Finland	15.97	Q
8	Kamil Maršálek	Czech Republic	16.18	Q
9	Oscar Cuartas	Colombia	16.23	
10	Jan Skružný	Czech Republic	16.68	
11	Frank Wille	Germany	17.05	
12	Erven Morice	France	17.10	
13	Slimann Dekhar	France	17.26	
14	Yoshiyuki Abe	Japan	17.32	
15	Sven Kaiser	Germany	17.70	
16	Juan José Iturralde	Spain	17.83	
17	Javier del Moral	Spain	18.04	
18	Makoto Oyama	Japan	18.13	

=== Final ===
Rank	Athlete	Nation	Time
1st place, gold medalist(s)	Evgeny Skorzhenko	Russia	14.63
2nd place, silver medalist(s)	Li Yong	China	15.21
3rd place, bronze medalist(s)	Zhao Ji	China	15.50
4	Aleksei Viazigin	Russia	15.71
5	Timo Suominen	Finland	15.74
6	Sami Sorri	Finland	15.76
7	Kamil Maršálek	Czech Republic	16.40
8	Aleksander Polak	Poland	16.44
