= Hyperbaric evacuation and rescue =

Emergency transport of divers under a decompression obligation to a place of safety

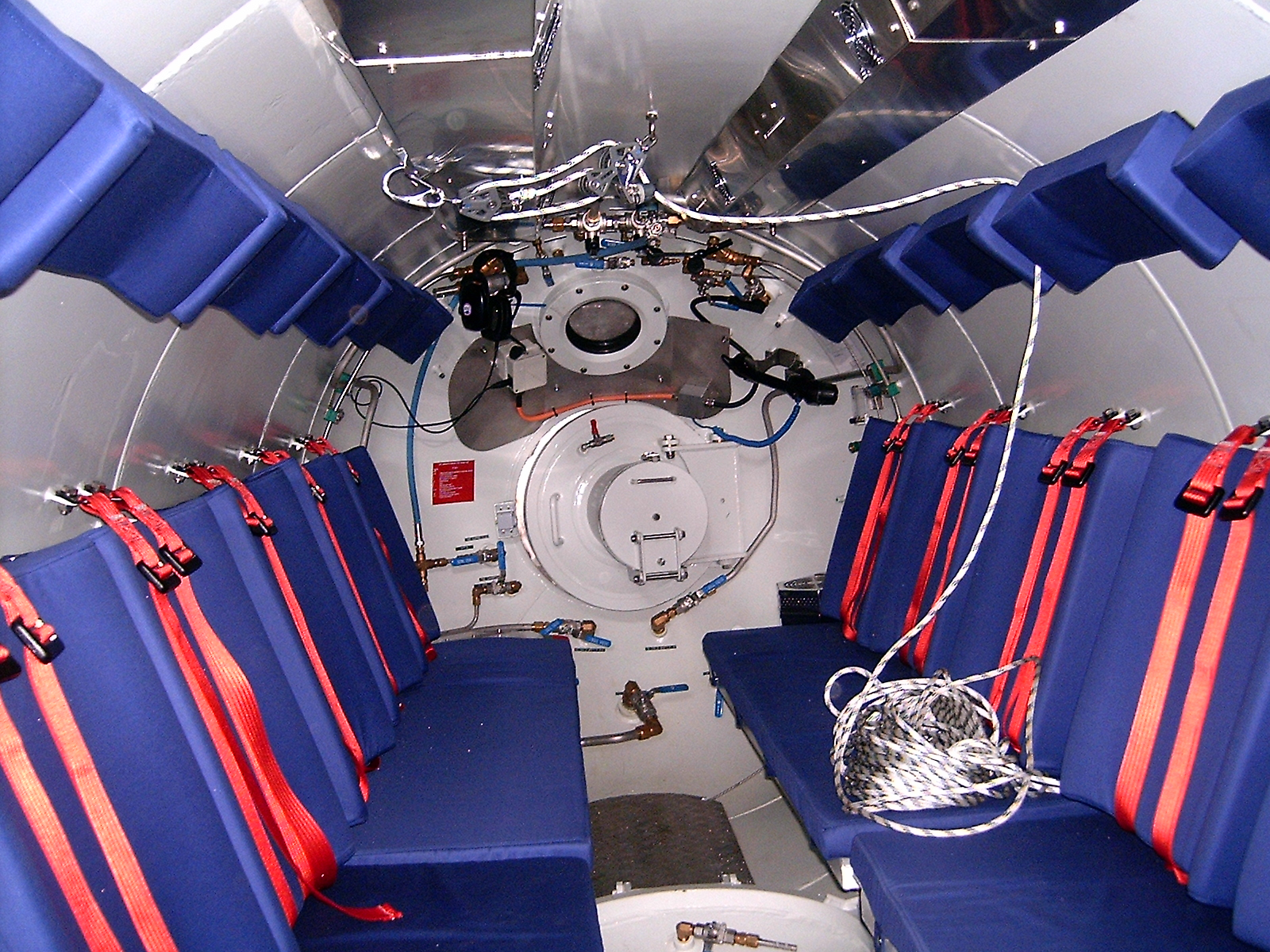
Interior of a self-propelled hyperbaric lifeboat

Hyperbaric evacuation and rescue is the emergency hyperbaric transportation of divers under a major decompression obligation to a place of safety where decompression can be completed at acceptable risk and in reasonable comfort.

Divers in saturation inside a diving system cannot be quickly decompressed to be evacuated in the same way as other installation personnel. The divers must be transferred to a pressurised chamber which can be detached from the installation's saturation diving system and transported to a safe location. A hyperbaric evacuation unit (HEU), also known as a hyperbaric rescue unit (HRU), with the capacity to evacuate the maximum number of divers that the diving system can accommodate, is required, with a life support system that can maintain the hyperbaric environment for at least 72 hours. After the initial evacuation, the HEU and its occupants are taken to a designated location where they can be safely decompressed to surface pressure.

The preferred way is to provide a self-propelled hyperbaric lifeboat (SPHL). Hyperbaric rescue chambers without propulsion (HRCs) are also accepted, but requirements for life support and recovery are complicated by limitations of design and configuration, and the unit must be towed clear of the evacuated installation by another vessel. Detailed guidance on hyperbaric evacuation is provided in IMCA D 052 - Guidance on hyperbaric evacuation systems.

After launching, the HEU is recovered by the standby hyperbaric rescue vessel (HRV) and transported to the standby hyperbaric reception facility (HRF), where the divers are transferred under pressure and decompressed in relative safety and comfort. In remote locations the HRF may be mounted onboard the HRV.

Another type of hyperbaric evacuation is for medical purposes, usually for a single diver, and may be done in a portable chamber for one or two occupants or a hyperbaric stretcher, The diver may be in saturation or being treated for decompression illness, so the pressure will be either the saturation pressure or treatment pressure, which is usually much lower, at about 18 msw (2.8 bar absolute), with the diver on an oxygen treatment table. The second occupant is usually a hyperbaric chamber attendant, to provide any necessary emergency medical assistance. Portable chambers may be transported by any vessel of opportunity, road transport vehicle or helicopter capable of carrying the load.

== Purpose ==
Saturation diving is normally done from a saturation system on a diving support vessel or an offshore platform. While under saturation, the divers cannot be decompressed quickly in response to an emergency as that would be rapidly fatal, and though unusual, emergencies requiring personnel evacuation have occurred on such platforms due to extreme weather or accidents. Any attempt to evacuate saturated divers must be done at or very near their saturation storage pressure, in a hyperbaric chamber provided with life support systems which maintain the pressure and temperature, and keep the breathing gas correctly oxygenated and free of excessive carbon dioxide. A hyperbaric evacuation and rescue plan is necessary, and the equipment is normally required to be on standby during all saturation diving operations.

The International Maritime Organization's Code of Safety for Diving Systems, 1995, provides guidance and recommendations on saturation diving systems including the provision of hyperbaric evacuation facilities. The owners of the ships and installations involved in the diving operations are responsible for providing these contingency plans and equipment, which must cover irreparable damage to life support systems, explosion, fire and other damage or circumstances making it untenable for divers to remain in the saturation habitat.

The risk to personnel in a hyperbaric evacuation unit is greater than in a full saturation installation, particularly when it is floating independently in the sea, and it should be possible to delay launch until it is clear that no further delay is acceptable, and this implies that the platform or vessel should be designed and constructed to provide a high level of protection to the diving system against fire, loss of stability and critical loss of buoyancy. Hyperbaric evacuation is the last resort, but when it is no longer avoidable it must be possible to launch quickly and safely.

If the contingency plans include possible decompression in another saturation system, it will be necessary to ensure that the locking on connections are compatible, or an adapter is available. Evacuation by hyperbaric lifeboat or floating capsule may cause severe dehydration of the occupants from motion sickness. Appropriate countermeasures should be available. Premature evacuation could expose the divers to unnecessary risk.

== Requirements ==
International Maritime Organization Resolution A.536(13) as amended by resolution A.831(19) provides guidance to minimize the risks to ships and other floating structures equipped with diving systems, divers and support personnel. The Code recommends design criteria and construction, equipment and survey standards for diving systems.

IMO Guidelines and Specifications for Hyperbaric Evacuation Systems require that diving systems installed on ships and offshore platforms have evacuation systems suitable for divers in saturation

Various options are permissible, depending on geographical and service conditions, which may be chosen based on risk assessment. These include hyperbaric self-propelled lifeboats, towable hyperbaric evacuation units, HEUs which may be loaded onto an attendant vessel, transfer to another facility in a diving bell, transfer between diving bells at the appropriate depth, or in a submersible unit capable of returning to the surface for recovery. There must be a safe method of transfer under pressure from the surface hyperbaric facility to the evacuation unit, with interlocks to prevent inadvertent decompression of any of the components, and there must be arrangements for transferring an unconscious diver into the evacuation unit. Pressure doors must be designed to prevent accidental opening under pressure, and locking mechanisms must be accessible from both sides.

Guidance on planning and executing diving operations from fixed or mobile platforms or from floating production, storage and offloading (FPSO) vessels, and planning evacuation from the installation for divers and other members of the dive team in an emergency, for surface supplied and saturation diving, is covered by "Guidance on Installation Based Diving Operations and the Evacuation of Divers from Installations IMCA D 025" and "Guidance on Hyperbaric Evacuation Systems IMCA D 052".

The IMCA requirements for hyperbaric evacuation systems specify that they must be designed and installed in accordance with recognized standards and codes of practice, have sufficient capacity to evacuate all of the divers in saturation, provide life support to all occupants during evacuation, have an emergency power supply, communications with the surface, and equipment to monitor the conditions in the chamber.

== Components of the system ==
There are three major components to the system: the hyperbaric evacuation unit (HEU), in which the divers are removed from the original facility, the hyperbaric rescue vessel (HRV), which recovers the HEU from the sea, and the hyperbaric reception facility (HRF), into which the divers are transferred, and where they are decompressed.

=== Hyperbaric evacuation unit ===
The primary component of a hyperbaric evacuation or rescue system is a hyperbaric chamber in which the occupants can be transported to a place of relative safety while under controlled pressure. This requires a portable life support system connected to the chamber during transit. Types of hyperbaric evacuation units include:

- A self-propelled hyperbaric lifeboat (SPHL) is an enclosed, motorised, survival vessel fitted with a hyperbaric chamber to transport divers under pressure, with a life support system and a crew to operate it. The crew would include a helmsman, a life-support technician, and possibly others, in compliance with IMO requirements. Once launched, it can navigate and maneuver in preparation for recovery.
- A hyperbaric escape capsule, a smaller, unmotorised hyperbaric unit which, when launched, simply drifts at the surface until recovered by the hyperbaric rescue vessel.
- The launch and recovery system transfers the hyperbaric evacuation unit into the sea or directly to the hyperbaric rescue vessel. It is usually also capable of recovering the hyperbaric evacuation unit if conditions improve sufficiently.
- A hyperbaric rescue chamber is a self-contained hyperbaric chamber and autonomous life support system portable by crane, intended for use in hyperbaric rescue, which may also be suitable for use as an accommodation component of a larger saturation system.

=== Hyperbaric rescue vessel ===
A hyperbaric rescue vessel (HRV) is a ship provided with equipment to handle the recovery of hyperbaric lifeboats and hyperbaric rescue capsules, and transport them to the hyperbaric reception facility. Such a vessel may be on standby during a saturation diving project.

=== Hyperbaric reception facility ===
A hyperbaric reception facility, or hyperbaric rescue facility, is a unit which allows for connection of hyperbaric lifeboats and hyperbaric rescue capsules for transfer under pressure. It is a basic saturation diving accommodation facility which will not be used to support diving operations, and is usually modular and portable so the components can be moved to a suitable venue and assembled for standby with the hyperbaric rescue vessel (HRV). The facility is usually set up at a convenient port where the hyperbaric rescue vessel can berth to unload the hyperbaric evacuation unit, but in remote locations can be carried onboard the HRV.

== Design and construction ==
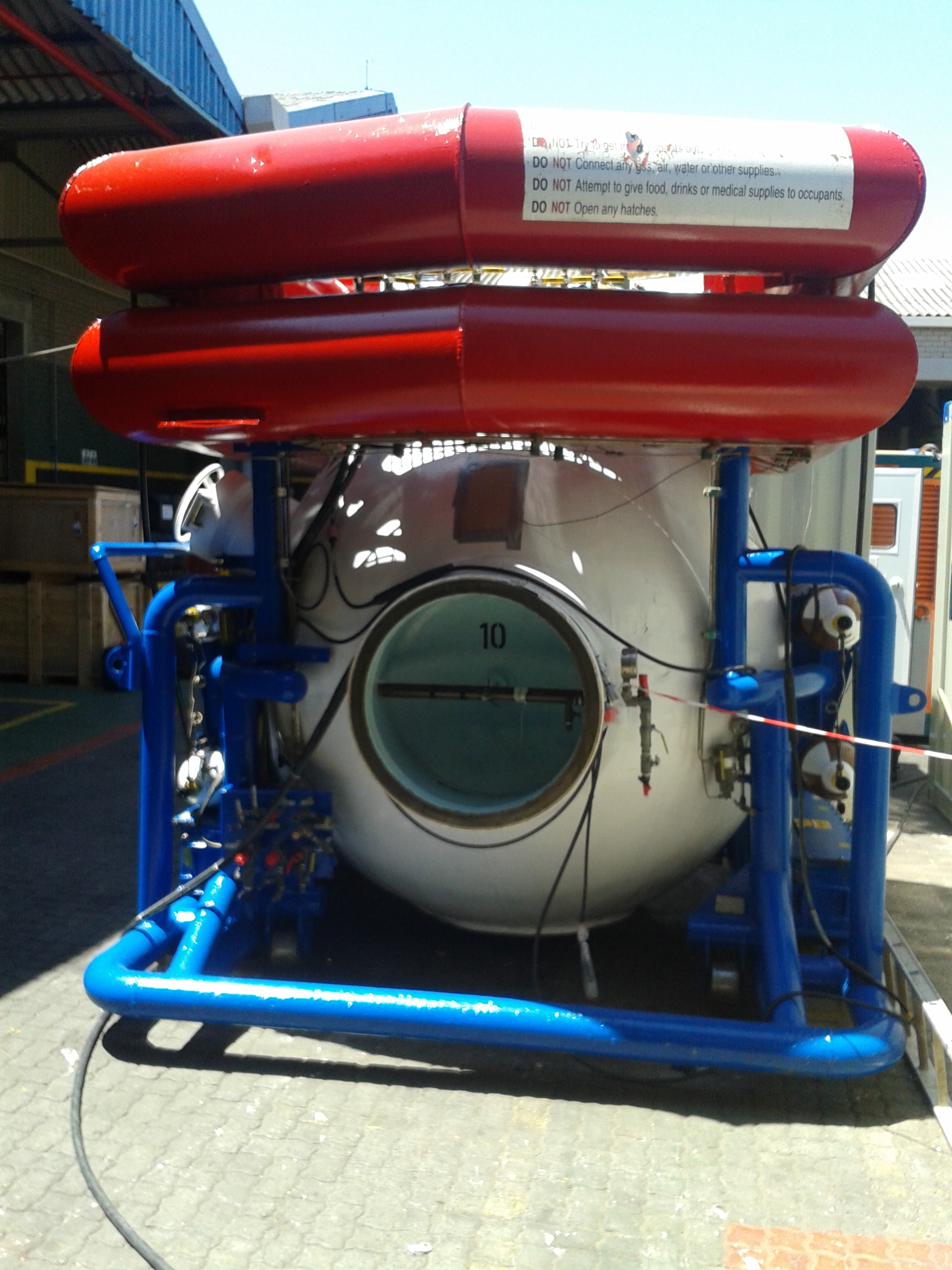
Small hyperbaric escape module

A set of design specifications for various aspects of the hyperbaric evacuation unit are provided by IMCA D 051. These cover towing and lifting points and connections, location aids, transfer under pressure connection flange and clamp details and positions, and service connections, to ensure mutual compatibility of units from different sources.

The exterior of the HEU will generally be fitted with towing and lifting points that can be used by any vessel, and with non-slip surfaces, footholds and handholds to allow safe access by rescue personnel to these lifting and towing points. A life support system independent of the primary saturation system life support system is provided for the HEU, which must be capable of providing autonomous life support functions to maintain thermal balance and a safe and breathable atmosphere for at least 72 hours after launching, taking into account gas usage for supply lock operation and waste discharge, and environmental conditions such as sea and air temperature and humidity. Life support system connections for connection to external systems should be positioned to be protected from accidental damage, and where they are easily accessible. There are standards for the type of connections recommended in IMCA D 051

The HEUs compression chamber environment is monitored from the outside and there is a medical/stores lock to lock materials in and out. When the HEU is connected to the hyperbaric complex at the work-site, the control and monitoring is done from the saturation control room.

Fenders are required to protect the hull and equipment from impact with other vessels when in the water. Fire protection should be equivalent to that required on other lifeboats for that ship or platform. HEUs that are intended to be launched into the sea must be sufficiently stable for all conditions in which they are designed to be used, and must be self-righting. Stability should not be so high that it has excessive adverse effects on the occupants, and must be sufficient when rescue personnel are on board to make preparations for recovery from the water. A reserve buoyancy of at least 10% of displacement is expected, and lifting points should be fitted above the normal waterline. Slings should be fitted to allow single-point lifting, without the need for spreaders, by any suitable crane. Buoyancy material and compartments must be non-flammable and strong enough to withstand the expected service conditions. Additional buoyancy beyond the required minimum may be provided by buoyancy bags. HEUs intended to be transported on a rescue vessel should have attachment points provided for securing to the deck.

== Launching and recovery ==
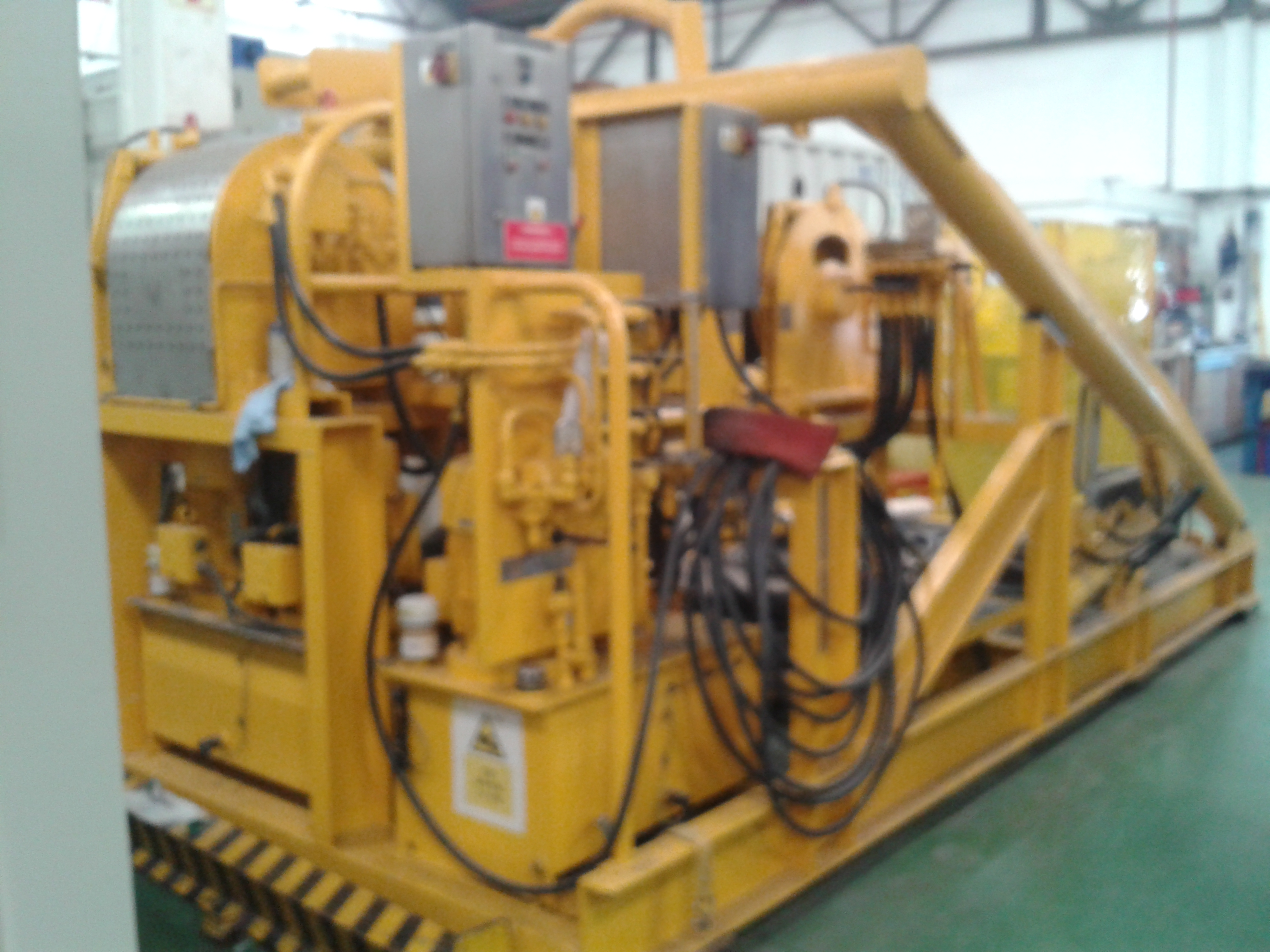
Launching gear for hyperbaric escape module

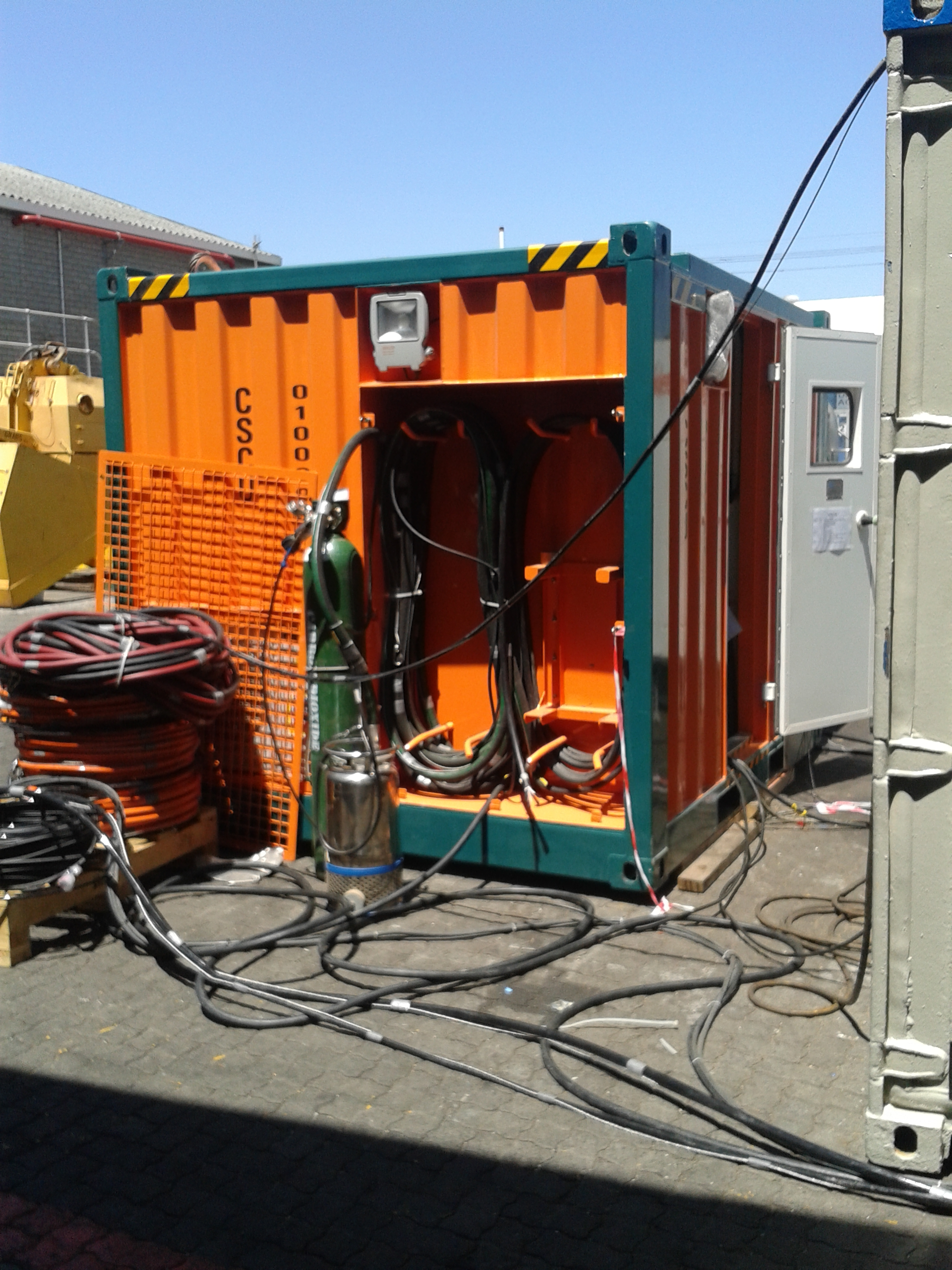
Hyperbaric escape module launch control room

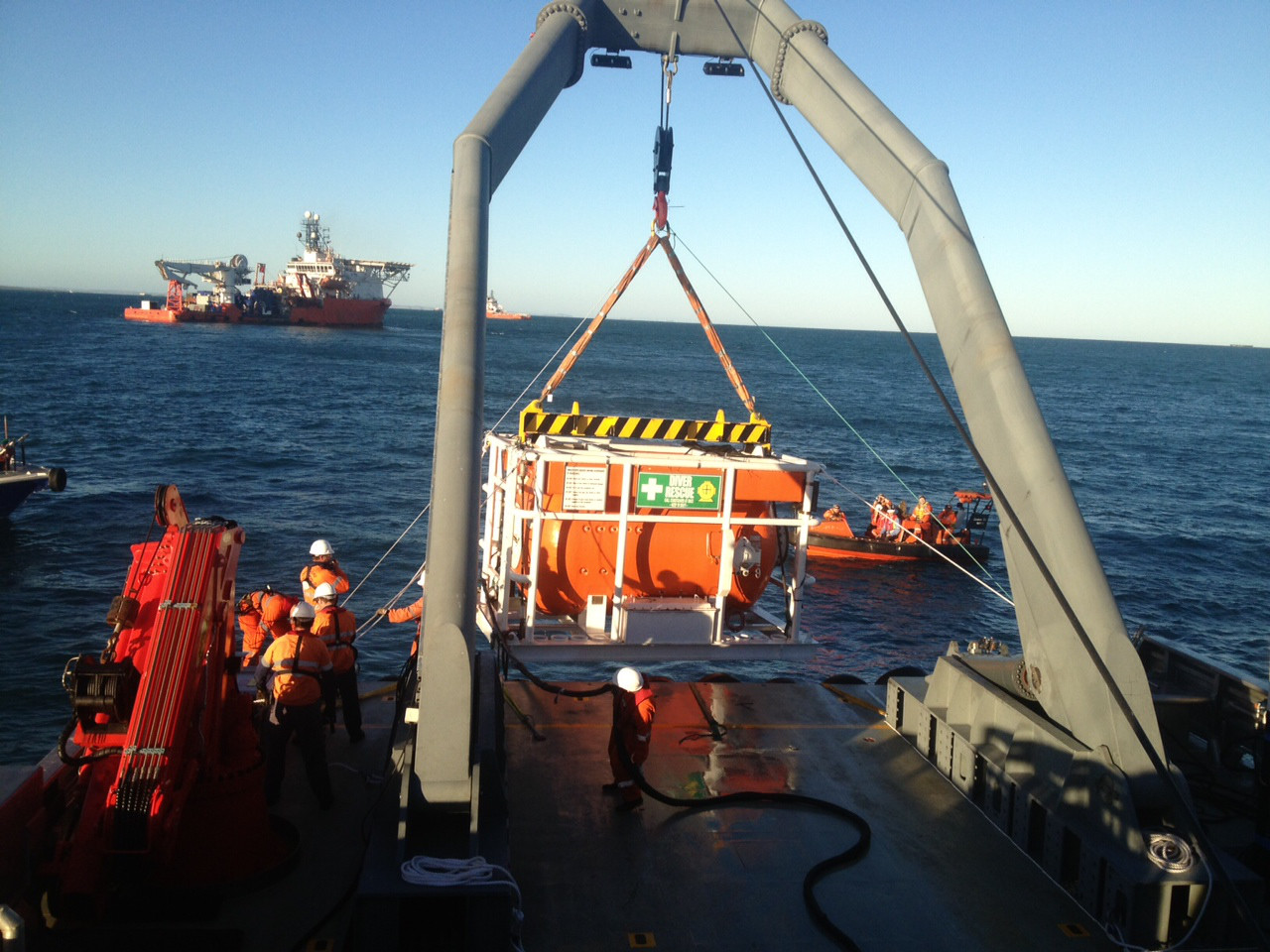
Recovery exercise of a hyperbaric escape module to the rescue vessel

Various launching methods are possible, and may be applicable to a given arrangement. These include float-off, lowering from davits, free-fall, crane launch. The systems available should be operable in the full range of expected operating and plausible emergency conditions, which apply to the vessel or platform's other emergency evacuation equipment, and designed to accommodate snatch loads.

The launch method should allow launching to be delayed as long as safely possible, as once the launch has been committed, it is often not possible to revert without the intervention of a suitable rescue vessel. Where a power supply is necessary, the should be an emergency backup power supply available. The ability to make a direct transfer by crane to another vessel is desirable.

If launching is to be done by a crane there should be a backup crane available. Gas systems and normal power supply to the evacuation unit must be easily and quickly detachable, and holding down equipment suitable for quick release. The launch mechanism or an alternative should be able to recover the unit for reconnection to the diving system.

Disconnection of the evacuation unit from the diving system should be possible by the occupants without external aid, and by the external crew, without aid from the occupants, and launching and lowering equipment should also be possible to trigger from inside the unit. Lifeboat type units will be crewed by an attendant who can release the unit, and float off units must have a quick release system which can be triggered when it is unlikely that the unit will make further contact with the ship.

== See also ==
- Emergency decompression – Decompression which accepts a normally unacceptable risk to avoid a more severe risk
  - Emergency decompression from saturation, also known as Emergency saturation decompression – Accelerated decompression from saturation at a normally unacceptable rate
- Offshore diving – Diving outside the territorial waters of a country
- Surface decompression – Decompression in a diving chamber out of the water
- Saturation diving – Diving mode and decompression technique
- Transfer under pressure diving, also known as Bell bounce diving – Surface oriented diving from a closed bell and a chamber for decompression
