= Fresh gas flow =

Fresh gas flow may refer to:

- Gas addition to a diving rebreather
- Gas addition to an anaesthetic machine
