= Helium analyzer =

Instrument to measure the concentration of helium in a gas mixture

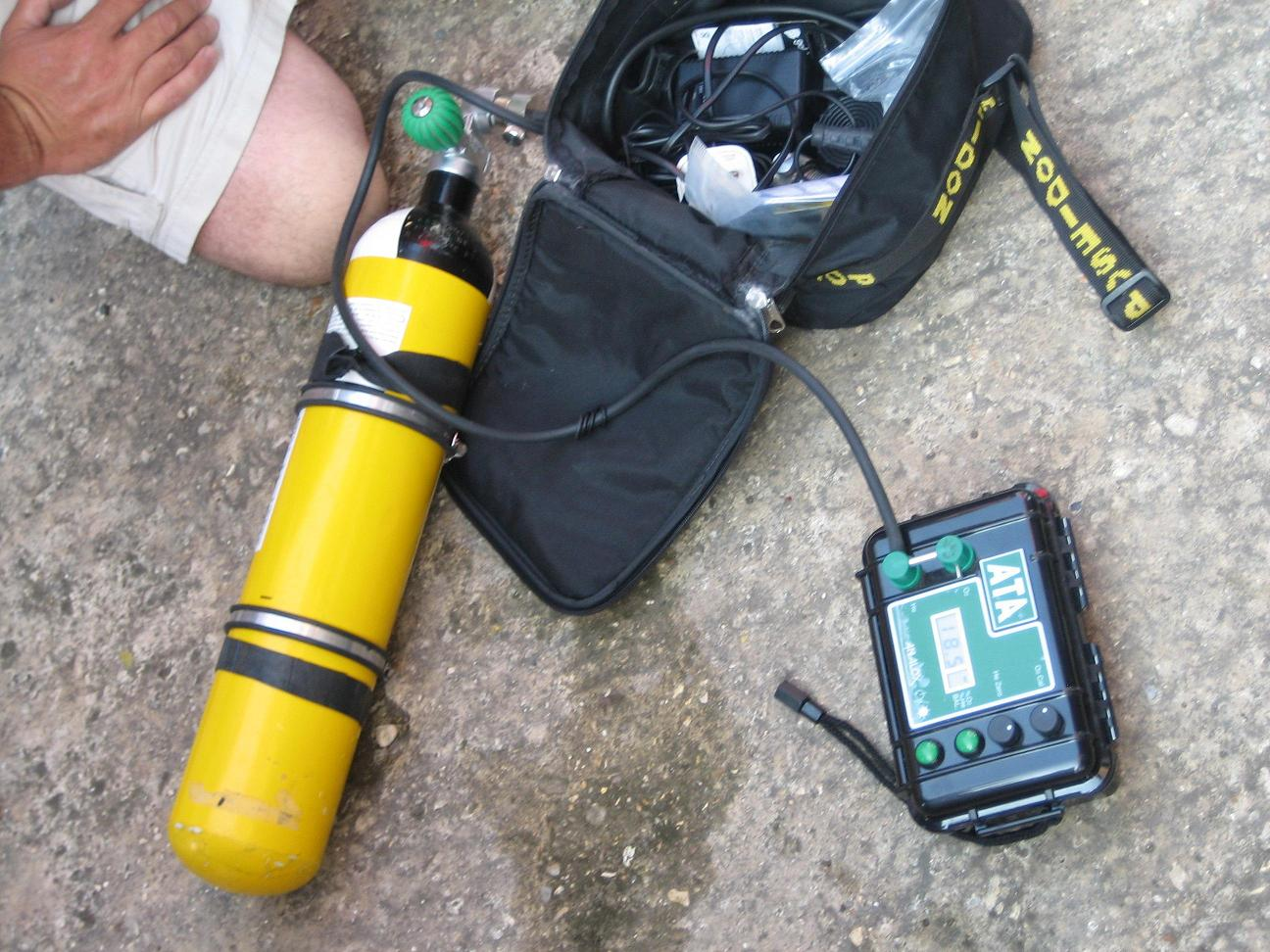
Analysing a trimix blend using a portable helium analyzer

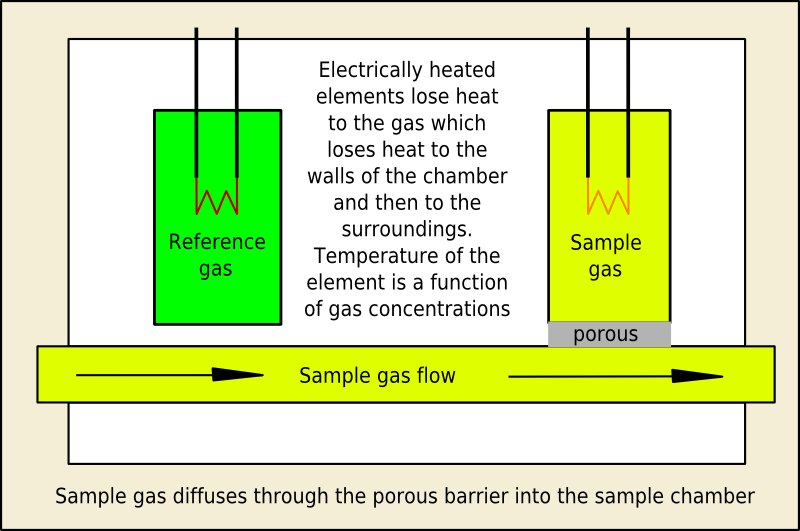
Principle of the thermal conductivity gas analyzer

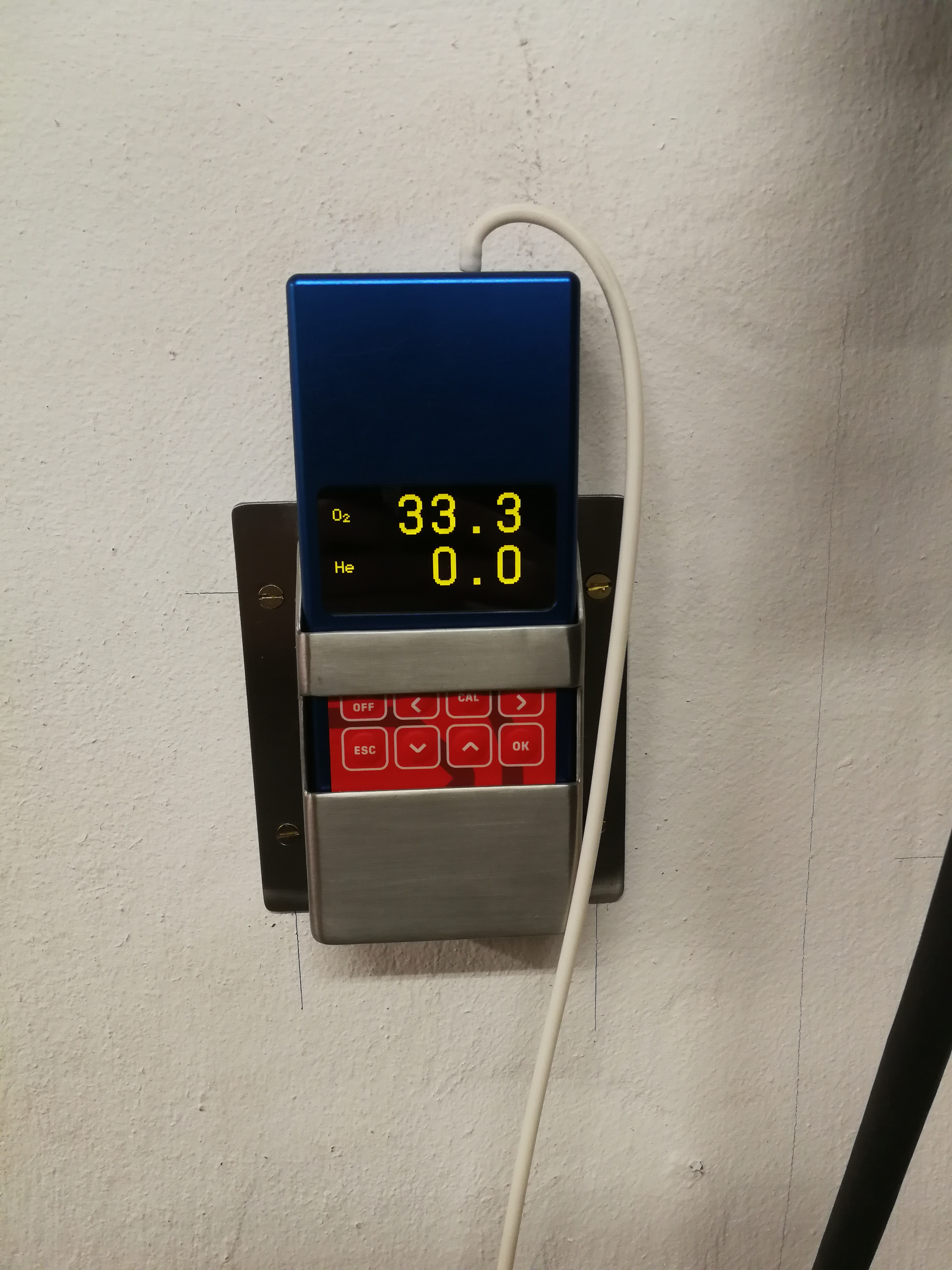
Continuous flow oxygen and helium analyser monitoring blended breathing gas for diving

A Helium analyzer is an instrument used to identify the presence and concentration of helium in a mixture of gases.

== Applications ==
A helium analyzer is typically used in the following applications:

- Technical Scuba Diving: In Technical diving where breathing gas mixtures known as Trimix comprising oxygen, helium and nitrogen are used, it is necessary to know the fraction of helium in the mixture to reliably calculate decompression schedules for dives using that mixture.
- Leak Detection: Helium gas analyzers are used to detect helium escaping from pressurized systems, identifying microscopic leaks in vacuum chambers, cryogenic equipment, and pipelines.
- Semiconductor Manufacturing: Ultra-pure helium analysis detects parts-per-billion impurities during chip fabrication, ensuring product quality.

== Thermal conductivity principle ==
Portable instruments for the analysis of helium content of breathing gas mixtures may be based on a thermal conductivity sensor (katharometer). These sensors can be very stable and maintenance free and also highly reliable and accurate.

A typical thermal helium analyser comprises two chambers, each with an identical thermal conductivity sensor. One chamber is sealed and is filled with pure helium as the reference gas, and the other receives the sample gas. The difference in thermal conductivity of the reference and sample gases is measured and converted into a concentration value by the electronic circuitry in the instrument. The system is inherently stable and when precise temperature compensation is made, the system is more than adequately accurate for breathing gas analysis. Accuracy and display precision is typically within 0.1%, and accuracy within 1% is considered sufficient for most decompression algorithms.

The thermal conductivity of nitrogen and oxygen are very similar, and that of helium very different so that the ratio of oxygen and nitrogen in the mix is relatively unimportant, and need not be compensated. This allows a direct reading of helium fraction from these instruments. However, for greater accuracy and compensation to oxygen cross-sensitivity, some instruments include an oxygen cell, and in these cases can generally give a full helium and oxygen analysis of the mixture simultaneously.

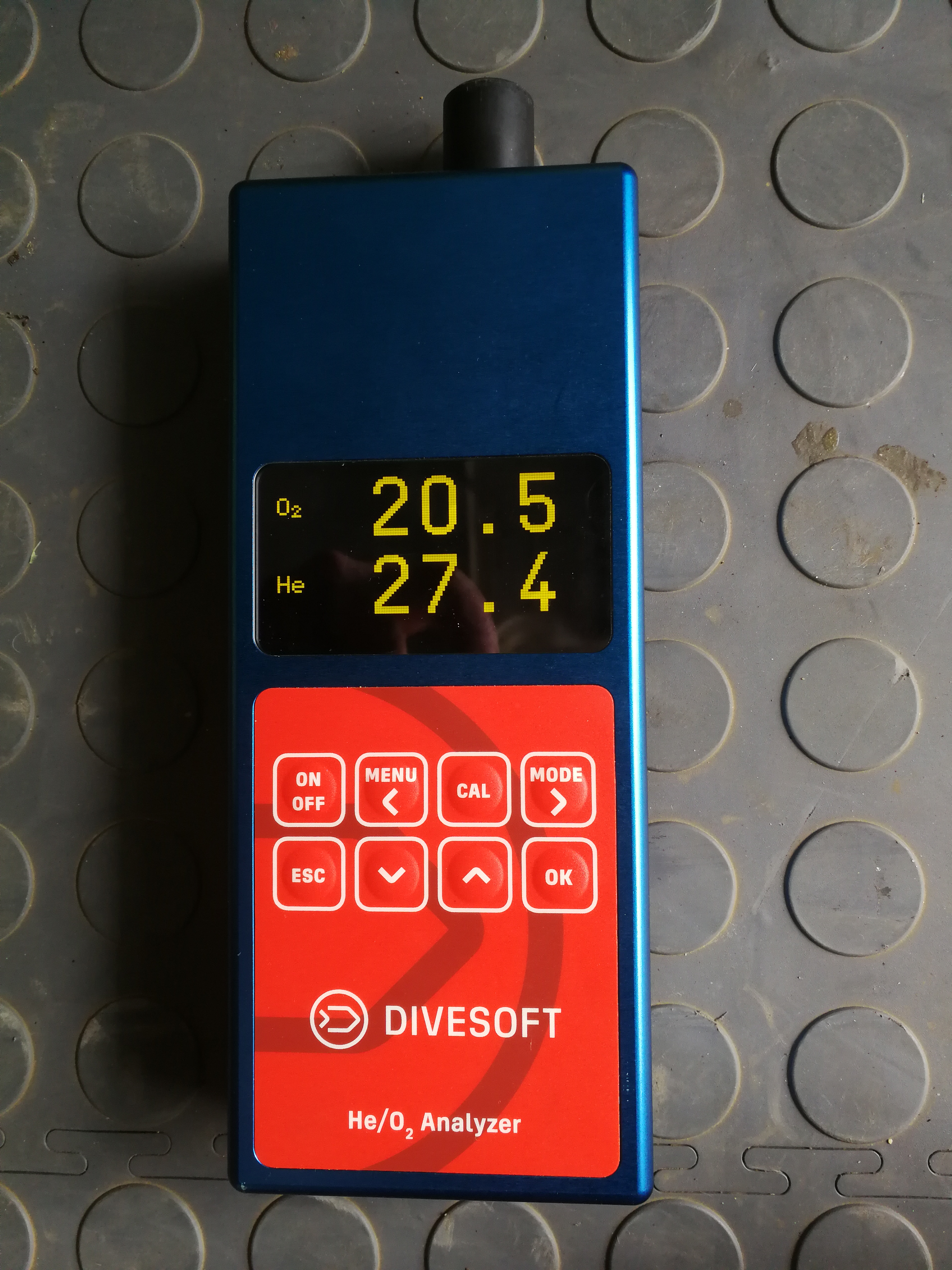
Trimix gas analyser showing oxygen and helium partial pressures

== Speed of sound principle ==
Helium content may also be determined on the basis of measuring the speed of sound in the analyzed gas mixture. The speed of sound depends on the mixture of gases and the temperature of the mix; in the analysis of trimix the speed of sound can be described by a non-linear function of temperature, oxygen content and helium content, and thus the content of helium can be determined by measuring the speed of sound through the mix, the temperature of the mix and its oxygen content.

== See also ==
- Gas blending § Gas analysis
