= GPS sonobuoy =

Acoustic positioning devices

GPS sonobuoy or GPS intelligent buoy (GIB) are a type of inverted long-baseline (LBL) acoustic positioning devices where the transducers are installed on GPS-equipped sonobuoys that are either drifting or moored. GIBs may be used in conjunction with an active underwater device (such as a pinger equipped torpedo), or with a passive acoustic sound source (such as an inert bomb striking the surface of the water). Typically the sound source or impact event is tracked or localized using a time of arrival (TOA) technique. Typically several GIBs are deployed over a given area of operation; with the total number determined by the size of the test area and the accuracy of the results desired. Different methods of GPS positioning may be used for positioning the array of GIBs, with accuracies of cm to meter level in realtime possible.

Buoys are manufactured by the French company ACSA-underwater-GPS (subsidiary of the ALCEN group). Three off-the shelf products are available from the small portable GIB-Lite system to the large torpedo tracking GIB-FT, and including the medium-size, medium-range GIB-Plus system.

== History and examples of use ==
Use of GIBs for underwater tracking and weapon scoring have been in use by the US Navy since the early to mid 1990s. Early GIBs were created for broad ocean area weapons testing by modifying conventional Navy sonobuoys with small OEM-grade GPS receivers and deploying them from a helicopter or from P-3 Orion aircraft. The GPS data captured by the GIB was modulated over the analog VHF acoustic data stream using frequency-shift keying (FSK). This allows the GPS measurement data to be transmitted and received on legacy VHF sonobuoy receiver equipment. A drifting array of twelve or more GIBs would be deployed in a concentric circular array approximately 7 nm in diameter. Weapon strikes within the array emitted acoustic signatures that were captured by the GIBs and transmitted up to the orbiting aircraft. Post-mission the GPS and acoustic data from the GIBs would be combined to determine an absolute coordinate for the impact location in WGS 84 coordinates.

== Example of underwater acoustic-based weapon scoring ==
Figure 1: An array of GIBs positioned around a test area to provide weapon impact coordinates from weapon testing or training. Upon striking the water, acoustic signatures are captured and processed by each GIB, and relayed to the shipboard or a land based command and control system for realtime processing

Figure 2: Photograph of the TARGT GIB

GIB type systems have been developed for a variety of specialized applications. An illustrative use of GIBs for underwater positioning is the TARGT weapon scoring and training system

The system concept (Figure 1) utilizes an array eight to ten GIBs (Figure 2) moored in a 2 km by 2 km array. In the case of the TARGT GIB, the GPS and RF antennas are located on top of the sensor and the hydrophone, or underwater acoustic transducer, is located on the bottom. The device is approximately 6 ft tall and weighs 35 lbs.

Inert weapon releases from military aircraft strike the surface of the water within the array, emitting an acoustic signature that is captured by each of the GIBs. Each GIB determines the precise time of the received signal and transmits this time to the deployment ship in near real time. A command and control system located on the deployment and recovery ship combines the GPS data and acoustic timing information to triangulate the impact location and determine the exact impact time in near realtime. Several methods may be used, the most common being a time difference of arrival (TDOA) least-squares solution algorithm. Post-mission data processing is performed to further refine the results, with two-dimensional positioning accuracies of 1 to 2 meters and impact timing accuracies of 1-2 milliseconds demonstrated.
