= Mares (scuba equipment) =

Italian manufacturer of underwater diving equipment

Mares S.p.A.
- Industry: Diving equipment manufacturer
- Founded: 1949; 77 years ago in Rapallo, Liguria, Italy
- Founder: Ludovico Mares
- Headquarters: Rapallo, Liguria, Italy
- Area served: Worldwide
- Parent: Head
- Website: www.mares.com

Mares is a manufacturer of scuba equipment. Founded in 1949 by Ludovico Mares in Rapallo, Italy, the company initially made diving masks and spearguns. It has since expanded to become one of the largest scuba manufacturers, having merged with US manufacturer Dacor.

== Products ==
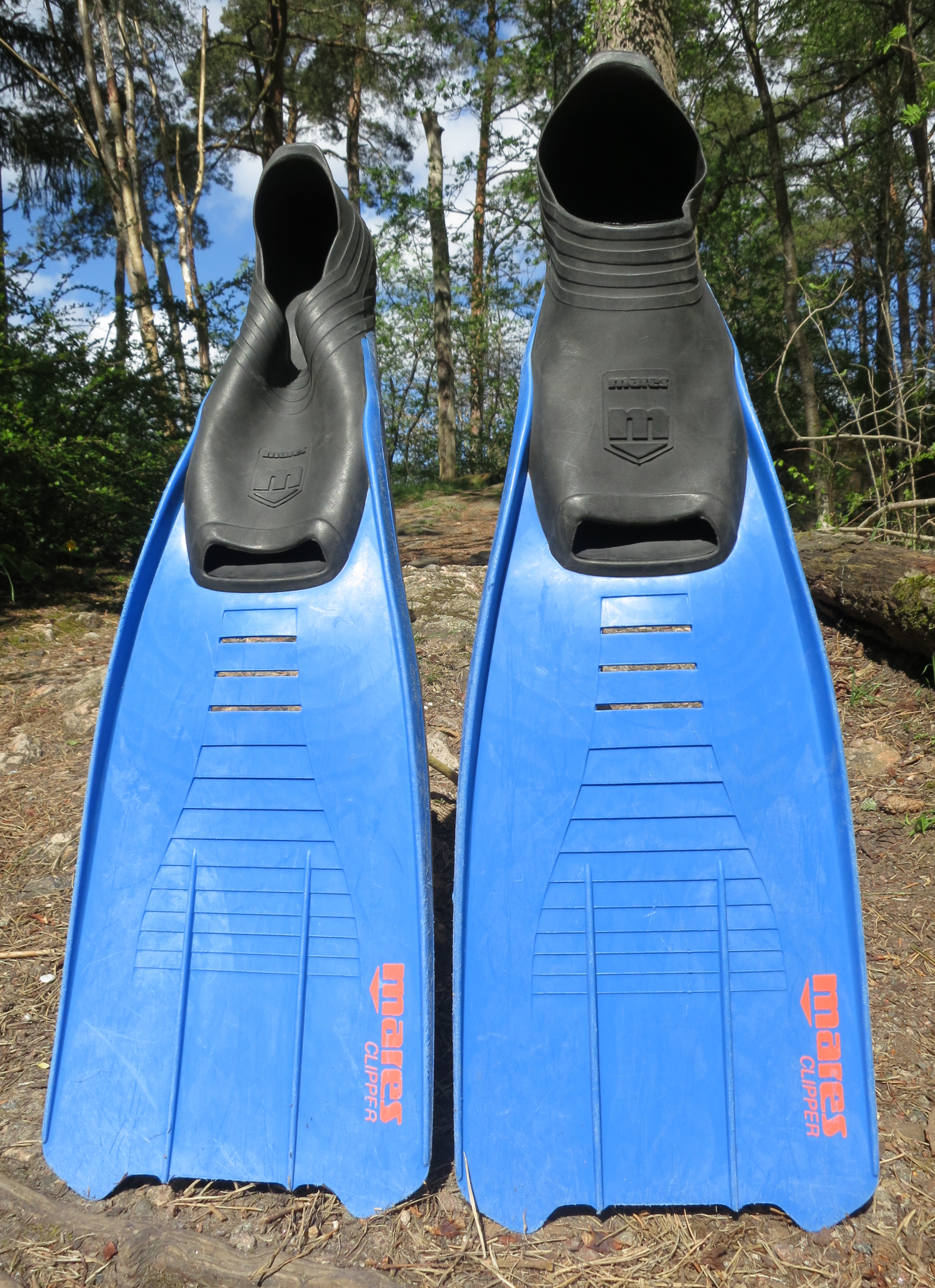
Swimfins by Mares

The Mares product range includes the following products:

- Diving regulators - Both first stage and second stage regulators
- Dive computers
- Instruments - compasses, pressure gauges, Personal computer interfaces for their dive computers and watches
- B.C.D.s
- Diving Wear – including wetsuits, drysuits and rash guards
- Fins
- Diving masks and snorkels
- Accessories - Their accessories line includes dive torches, knives, surface marker buoys, diving sportswear, bags, weight belts, hangers, dry boxes, etc.

In 2019, Mares entered the rebreather market with the launch of the Horizon.
