= Luigi Ferraro =

Officer of the Royal Italian Navy and pioneer of Italian submarine warfare

Luigi Ferraro (3 November 1914, Quarto dei Mille – 5 January 2006, Genoa) was an officer of the Royal Italian Navy and pioneer of Italian submarine warfare, most notable for his service with the commando frogman unit Decima Flottiglia MAS. In 1943 in Turkey he attacked four ships carrying chromium ore. He was decorated with the gold medal for military valor for having sunk three enemy ships alone.

Ferraro designed a number of innovations in scuba diving equipment for Cressi-sub, and in 1962 with Carlos Reinberg, he founded Technisub, a manufacturer of various underwater diving equipment.

Cressi made and launched Luigi Ferraro's two most important innovations during the early 1950s. One was the "Pinocchio" diving mask, the first mask with a rubber nose pocket enabling the fingers to pinch the nostrils, facilitating ear equalization. The other was the Cressi Rondine, the first swimming fin featuring a closed-heel foot pocket, a toe opening and a blade set at an angle from the plane of the sole of the foot, which improved both wearing comfort and hydrodynamic efficiency.
