= Faber Industrie S.p.A. =

Italian manufacturer of high pressure gas storage cylinders

Faber Indistrie S.p.A.
- Industry: High pressure compressed gas storage cylinder manufacture
- Founded: 1969; 57 years ago in Cividale Del Friuli, Italy
- Founder: Renzo Toffolutti
- Headquarters: Cividale Del Friuli, Italy
- Area served: Worldwide
- Products: Steel and filament wound fibre composite high pressure gas cylinders
- Website: www.faber-italy.com

Faber Industrie S.p.A., also known as Faber Cylinders, is an Italian manufacturer of alloy steel and composite high-pressure storage cylinders and accumulators for compressed gas and underwater diving industries. They supply equipment for fire-fighting, beverage industries, compressed natural gas storage and vehicles, and hydrogen storage and transportation for worldwide markets in over 50 countries. Tough Components SRL is a subsidiary of Faber. The company's headquarters are located in Cividale Del Friuli.

== History ==
Faber was established in 1969 by Renzo Toffolutti in Cividale del Friuli, in north-east Italy. The factory has been operating since 1972 manufacturing steel cylinders from pressed steel plate. Between 1980 and 1990, the export market was expanded to 65% of production, and a new facility to produce cylinders from seamless tube was set up to diversify the materials that can be used in production.

From 1990 to 2000, Faber gained ISO 9001 certification and bought a facility in Castelfranco Veneto from Simmel Difesa, with equipment for manufacturing cylinders from hot pierced billets and a production line for hoop wound type 2 gas cylinders was established in Cividale.

Between 2000 and 2010, Faber installed two fully automated production lines for pressing from discs stamped from steel coil raw material, and a new line for type 3 fully wrapped composite cylinders in Cividale. During this period Faber also achieved ISO 14001 and ISO/TS certifications.

Growth of manufacturing capacity over the years has reached nearly one million cylinders per year. Since 2010 Faber has also gone into production of type 4 filament wound composite cylinders. Hydrogen gas storage, transport and filling station components are produced with working pressures up to 1100 bar, and Faber can manufacture and provide cylinders integrated into cylinder racks for vehicles, bundles, and multi-element containers for trailers.

In 2022 an attempted purchase of 99.41% of the share capital of Faber Industrie by Rosatom GasTech LLC, a subsidiary of Russian state nuclear energy corporation Rosatom was blocked by Italian Prime Minister Mario Draghi.

== Quality assurance ==
Faber’s quality management system is certified to ISO 9001, IATF16949, ISO 45001, ISO 14001 and ISO 50001.

== Product size range ==
The range of cylinder capacities is from 1 litre to 700 litres water capacity, based on a moderate range of external diameters from 100 to 660mm, with length selected to produce the desired volume taking wall thickness and end geometry into account. Wall thickness is chosen to provide the required strength and corrosion margin required by the standard to which the batch is manufactured, and is a function of diameter, working pressure and test pressure. The cylinders are suitable for a wide range of applications with working pressures up to 1100 bar for industrial, medical and special gas applications. They are relatively light in weight compared to other cylinders of similar specification. Faber claims that this is due to characteristics of the production process.

Faber manufactures steel cylinders by three methods and produces four types by composition:

- Type 1: Seamless steel cylinders (all metal)
- Type 2: Seamless steel cylinders hoop wrapped with load-sharing fibre composite.
- Type 3: Seamless steel cylinders fully wrapped with load sharing fibre composite.
- Type 4: Full load bearing fibre composite cylinders wrapped on a non-load bearing core

The seamless steel cylinders are produced by pressing from plate, closing the ends of tubes, or forging from pierced billets, as Faber has facilities for all three production methods.
