= Interspiro DCSC =

Military semi-closed circuit passive addition diving rebreather

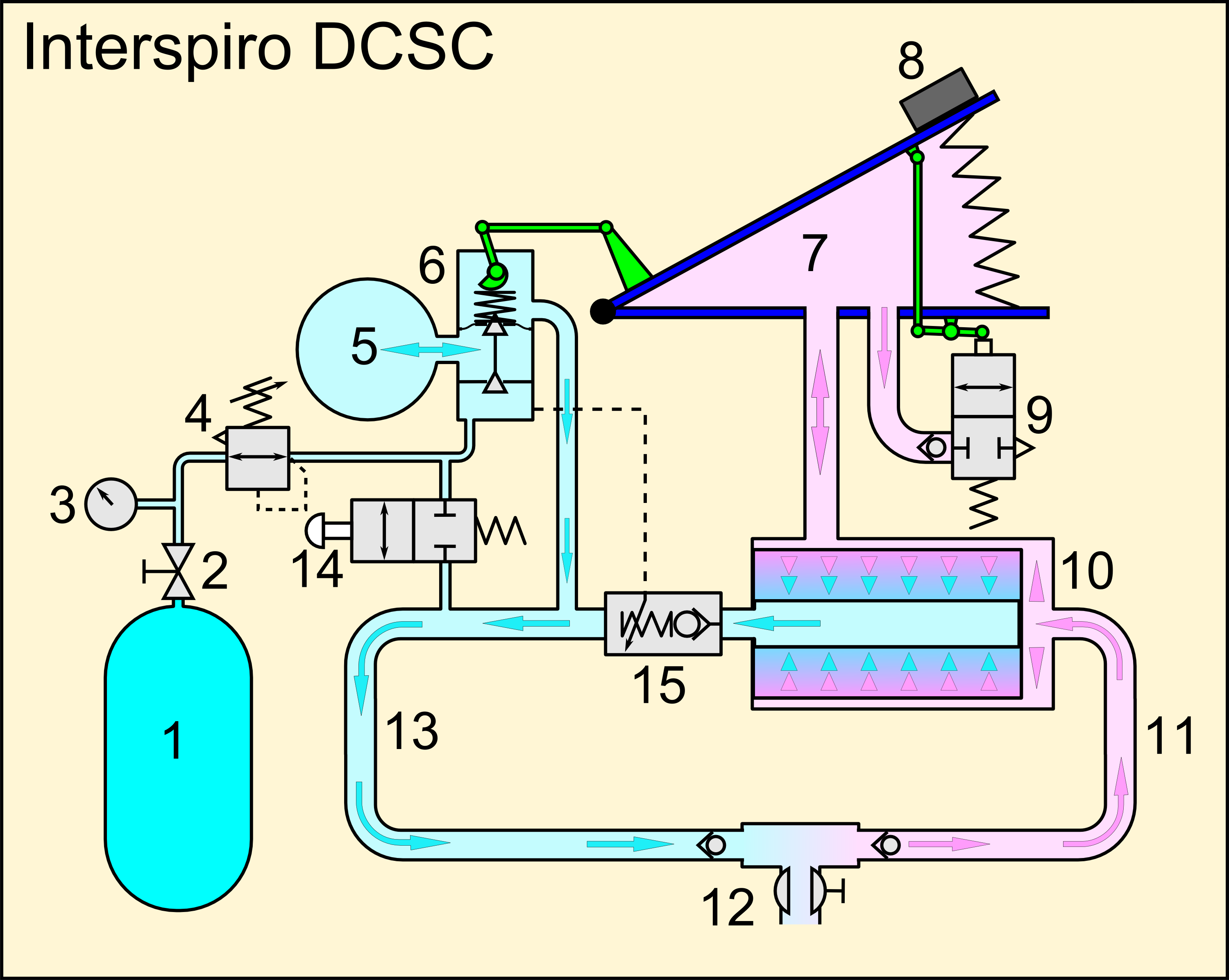
Schematic diagram of the breathing loop of the Interspiro DCSC seni-closed circuit rebreather 1 Nitrox feed gas cylinder 2 Cylinder valve 3 Pressure gauge 4 Feed gas first stage regulator 5 Dosage chamber 6 Dosage mechanism with control linkage from bellows cover 7 Hinged bellows counterlung 8 Bellows weight 9 Exhaust valve with control linkage from bellows cover 10 Radial flow scrubber 11 Exhalation hose 12 Mouthpiece with dive/surface valve and loop non-return valves 13 Inhalation hose 14 Manual bypass valve 15 Low gas warning valve

The Interspiro DCSC is a semi-closed circuit nitrox rebreather manufactured by Interspiro of Sweden for military applications. Interspiro was formerly a division of AGA and has been manufacturing self-contained breathing apparatus for diving, firefighting and rescue applications since the 1950s.

== History ==
The first Interspiro rebreather was the ACSC - the alternating closed and semi-closed circuit rebreather which was developed and marketed in the 1980s. In the 1990s this design was developed further to become the DCSC, also intended for mine countermeasures.

== Construction ==
Gas supply is carried in a 5l 200bar aluminium cylinder mounted horizontally at the bottom of the unit with the valve to the diver's left. The reserve valve and bypass valve are also on the left.

The fairing case holding the components is clipped to the tubular harness frame and can be released by pulling a knob on the lower right.

The scrubber is a radial flow cylindrical design, with inward flow. It carries a 2.5 kg charge of absorbent.

The counterlung is a wedge shaped bellows, hinged on the lower edge, and the angle between the top and bottom covers is proportional to the internal volume. The change in top plate angle, as the diver breathes, controls the gas addition mechanism.

The top plate of the bellows is ballasted, so that the lifting force of the air inside is balanced by the weights: when the diver is trimmed horizontally, face down, the weights create a slight positive pressure relative to ambient. This compensates for the depth difference between the counterlung and the diver's lungs, reducing the effort required to breathe. When the diver is upright the effect of the weights is cancelled as the weight is carried by the hinge, and when the diver is horizontal, face up, the weight causes a slight negative pressure in the bellows, which compensates for the increased hydrostatic pressure on the counterlung compared with the lungs.

The dump valve for the loop and also functions as a drain for water. The counterlung is in the exhalation side of the loop. Water from condensate and leakage is trapped in the bellows before it can reach the scrubber, and can be discharged through the exhaust valve for the loop, which is mounted on the lower plate of the bellows.

Volume of the bellows is about 4.5 litres, and total loop volume is about 7 litres.

Gas circulation: Exhalation hose to the right, inhalation from the left.

Approved operating depth range is from 0 to 57m. Nitrox 28% is used for depths below about 30m. and 46% for shallower depths.

Dimensions
Mass approximately 33kg

== Operating principle ==
The DCSC is an active addition semi-closed circuit rebreather, but has more in common with the passive addition systems, in that the amount of feed gas supplied is a function of the breathing rate of the diver. Unlike most passive addition rebreathers, the gas feed mass flow rate is independent of depth, and unlike most active addition systems, it is not constant mass flow.

=== Demand controlled semi-closed circuit ===
The Interspiro DCSC is the only rebreather using this gas mixture control principle that has been marketed. The principle of operation is to add a mass of oxygen that is proportional to the volume of each breath. This approach is based on the assumption that the volumetric breathing rate of a diver is directly proportional to metabolic oxygen consumption, which experimental evidence indicates is close enough to work. The fresh gas addition is made by controlling the pressure in a dosage chamber proportional to the counterlung bellows volume. The dosage chamber is filled with fresh gas to a pressure proportional to bellows volume, with the highest pressure when the bellows is in the empty position. When the bellows fills during exhalation, the gas is released from the dosage chamber into the breathing circuit, proportional to the volume in the bellows during exhalation, and is fully released when the bellows is full. Excess gas is dumped to the environment through the overpressure valve after the bellows is full.

The result is the addition of a mass of gas proportional to ventilation volume.

The volume of the dosage chamber is matched to a specific supply gas mixture, and is changed when the gas is changed. The DCSC uses two standard mixtures of nitrox: 28% and 46%, and has two corresponding dosage chambers.

The DCSC controls the feed gas pressure in the dosage chamber by changes of bellows angle, which is proportional to the change in volume in the loop. A mechanical linkage connects the bellows cover plate to an oscillating cam which controls loading of the diaphragm spring. The spring force controls a diaphragm in the dosage regulator which actuates the inlet and outlet valves.

Exhalation will increase of bellows angle and will increase loading on the control spring, pushing the dosage inlet valve open and allowing gas to flow into the dosage chamber until the increased pressure lifts the diaphragm and closes the valve again.

Inhalation will decrease the bellows angle, which reduces the spring loading, and the internal pressure in the dosage chamber will lift the diaphragm against the spring, opening the dosage outlet valve and allowing the gas to flow into the breathing circuit until the pressure in the dosage chamber is matched by the spring force, and the diaphragm is pushed back against the outlet valve to close it.

The feed gas is supplied by a depth compensated first stage regulator which takes gas from the cylinder and reduces the pressure to 3 bar above ambient pressure. A linkage connected to the bellows rotates a cam against the control spring in the dosage regulator, to adjust the spring force on the dosage regulator diaphragm.

=== Alarms and warnings ===
If the gas supply to the dosage mechanism were to fail without warning, the gas addition would stop and the diver would use up the oxygen in the loop gas until it became hypoxic and the diver lost consciousness. To prevent this, there is a controllable flow restriction in the inhalation side of the loop, which is operated by pressure from the supply gas in the dosage mechanism. This is open when there is suitable operating pressure in the dosage mechanism, but if this falls, the flow warning system imposes a restriction to the inhalation gas flow, similar to the effect of a low supply pressure on an open circuit demand valve, which warns the diver that there is a feed gas supply failure. The diver can then activate the reserve mechanism on the cylinder valve, which allows the last 25 bar from the cylinder to be used, which will de-activate the warning restriction. If the gas supply remains inadequate, the diver must take other action, such as bailing out to an independent open circuit gas supply.

== Oxygen partial pressure in the breathing loop ==
The gas calculation differs from other semi-closed circuit rebreathers. A diver with a constant workload during aerobic working conditions will use an approximately constant amount of oxygen $V_{O_2}$ as a fraction of the respiratory minute volume $V_{RM}$. This ratio of minute ventilation and oxygen uptake is the extraction ratio $K_E$, and usually falls in the range of 17 to 25 with a normal value of about 20 for healthy humans. Values as low as 10 and as high as 30 have been measured. Variations may be caused by the diet of the diver and the dead space of the diver and equipment, raised levels of carbon dioxide, or raised work of breathing and tolerance to carbon dioxide.

$K_E=\frac{V_{RM}}{V_{O_2}}$ (approximately 20)

Therefore, the respiratory minute volume may be expressed as a function of the extraction ratio and oxygen uptake:

$$V_{RM}=K_E*V_{O_2}$$

The volume of gas in the breathing circuit can be described as approximately constant, and the fresh gas addition must balance the sum of the dumped volume, the metabolically removed oxygen, and the volume change due to depth change. (metabolic carbon dioxide added to the mixture is removed by the scrubber and therefore does not affect the equation)

Oxygen partial pressure in the DCSC is controlled by the flow rate of feed gas through the dosage regulator and the oxygen consumption of the diver. Dump rate is equal to feed rate minus oxygen consumption for this case.

The change in the fraction of oxygen $dF_{O_2loop}$ in the breathing circuit may be described by the following equation:

$$V_{loop}*dF_{O_2loop}=(Q_{feed}*F_{O_2feed}-V_{O_2}-(Q_{feed}-V_{O_2})*F_{O_2loop})dt$$

Where:

$V_{loop}$ = volume of the breathing circuit
$Q_{feed}$ = flow rate of the fresh gas supplied by the orifice
$F_{O_2feed}$ = oxygen fraction of the supply gas
$V_{O_2}$ = oxygen uptake flow rate of the diver

This leads to the differential equation:

$$\frac{dF_{O_2loop}}{dt}=\frac{(Q_{feed}*F_{O_2feed}-V_{O_2}(t)-(Q_{feed}-V_{O_2})*F_{O_2loop}(t))}{V_{loop}}$$

With solution:

$$F_{O_2loop}(t)=\frac{Q_{feed}*F_{O_2feed}-V_{O_2}}{Q_{feed}-V_{O_2}}+(F_{O_2loop}^{start}-\frac{Q_{feed}*F_{O_2feed}-V_{O_2}}{Q_{feed}-V_{O_2}})*e^{-\frac{Q_{feed}-V_{O_2}}{V_{loop}}t}$$

Which comprises a steady state and a transient term.

The steady state term is sufficient for most calculations:

The steady state oxygen fraction in the breathing circuit, $F_{O_2loop}$, can be calculated from the formula:

$$F_{O_2loop}=\frac{(Q_{feed}*F_{O_2feed}-V_{O_2})}{(Q_{feed}-V_{O_2})}$$

Where:

$Q_{feed}$ = Flow rate of fresh gas supplied by the orifice
$V_{O_2}$ = Oxygen uptake flow rate of the diver
$F_{O_2feed}$ = Oxygen fraction of the supply gas

in a consistent system of units.

As oxygen consumption is an independent variable, a fixed feed rate will give a range of possible oxygen fractions for any given depth. In the interests of safety, the range can be determined by calculating oxygen fraction for maximum and minimum oxygen consumption as well as the expected rate.

Feed gas flow is a function of respiratory minute volume at surface pressure and the dosage ratio based on the dosage chamber volume. The values for dosage ratio are 60% for the large chamber and 30% for the small chamber.

$$Q_{feed}=K_{dosage}*V_{RM}$$

Substitution of the first equation into this yields:

$$Q_{feed}=K_{dosage}*K_E*V_{O_2}$$

This may be substituted into the steady state term to give:

$$F_{O_2loop}=\frac{(K_{dosage}*K_E*V_{O_2}*F_{O_2feed}-V_{O_2})}{(K_{dosage}*K_E*V_{O_2}-V_{O_2})}$$

Which simplifies to:

$$F_{O_2loop}=\frac{(K_{dosage}*K_E*F_{O_2feed}-1)}{(K_{dosage}*K_E*-1)}$$

This shows that there is no dependency depth or on oxygen uptake, and since the dosage ratio is constant once the gas has been selected, it is clear that the variations remaining are due to variations in the extraction ratio. This means that the DCSC has theoretically the most stable oxygen fraction of the semi-closed rebreathers and is a reasonable approximation of open circuit for decompression purposes. The unit has been used by the Swedish armed forces for over 15 years with a good safety record. However a large decompression stress when using air tables for decompression on dives using a 28% nitrox supply gas has been indicated by the presence of high venous gas emboli (VGE) scores post-dive. Oxygen fraction in the loop was not monitored during these tests.

== Gas endurance ==
The reserve valve is activated at about 25 bar. A 5-litre cylinder at 200 bar will provide about (200-25)*5 litres = 875 free gas at 1 bar available for the dive. A RMV of 30 L/min for a diver working moderately hard, using the 28% nitrox with a dosage ratio of 0,6 will use the gas in 875/(30*0.6) = 48 min. The 46% nitrox with a dosage ratio of 0.3 will last 875/(30*0.3) = 97 min. A 15 L/min RMV for light work will double these times.

== Scrubber endurance ==
The scrubber capacity is 2.5 kg of soda lime. If a conservative value of 100 litres CO_{2} per kg is used, the capacity of the scrubber will be 2.5*100 = 250 litres CO_{2}. At an extraction rate of 1/20 and a dosage rate of 0.3, some 875/0.3*1/20 = 146 litres of carbon dioxide may be produced by the diver, showing that endurance is not limited by the scrubber.

== See also ==
- Rebreather – Portable apparatus to recycle breathing gas
