= Fenzy =

French manufacturer of industrial and diving breathing equipment

Fenzy is a scuba diving and industrial breathing equipment design and manufacturing firm. It started in or before 1920 in France. Finally Honeywell bought them out.

In 1961 the company's founder and owner, Maurice Fenzy, invented a divers' adjustable buoyancy life jacket (ABLJ) (European terminology) or buoyancy compensator (BC) (North American terminology) that became so well known that the company name has become synonymous with the item, although Fenzy also manufactured rebreathers and other items.

Some industrial breathing sets whose make names contain "Fenzy", are made by Honeywell.

== See also ==
- Buoyancy compensator (diving) – Equipment for controlling the buoyancy of a diver
