= HeinrichsWeikamp =

German manufacturer of dive computers and other electronics for recreational diving

- Company type: Private
- Founded: 2004; 22 years ago
- Headquarters: Freiburg im Breisgau, Germany
- Key people: Matthias Heinrichs (CEO)
- Products: Scuba diving equipment
- Website: www.heinrichsweikamp.com

HeinrichsWeikamp, based in Germany, is a company that produces sports precision instruments for scuba diving including personal dive computers and oxygen partial pressure monitors for diving rebreathers.

Their products: OSTC, OSTC Mk.2, OSTC 2N, OSTC3, OSTC4 and Frog are supported by Subsurface, free software for logging dives authored by Linus Torvalds.

== History ==
HeinrichsWeikamp was founded by Matthias Heinrichs in 2004.

== Products ==
All Heinrichs Weikamp products are manufactured in their Freiburg im Breisgau-based facility.

=== OSTC Series ===
- OSTC diving computer The first dive computer created by HeinrichsWeikamp with a coloured display and an open source-based firmware. With Bluetooth data transfer and wireless Qi standard charging.
- OSTC Sport
- OSTC 2
- OSTC 4

==== OSTC Tools ====
- Diving Log
- Subsurface
- ppO2 monitor
- hw HUD rebreather monitor
- Digital adapters and remote slave units (RSU)

==== Submersive depth gauges ====
- Bottom Timer

==== Lamp Systems ====
- hw100 lamp system
- hw backup lamp
