= Index of underwater diving: O–R =

Alphabetical listing of underwater diving related topics

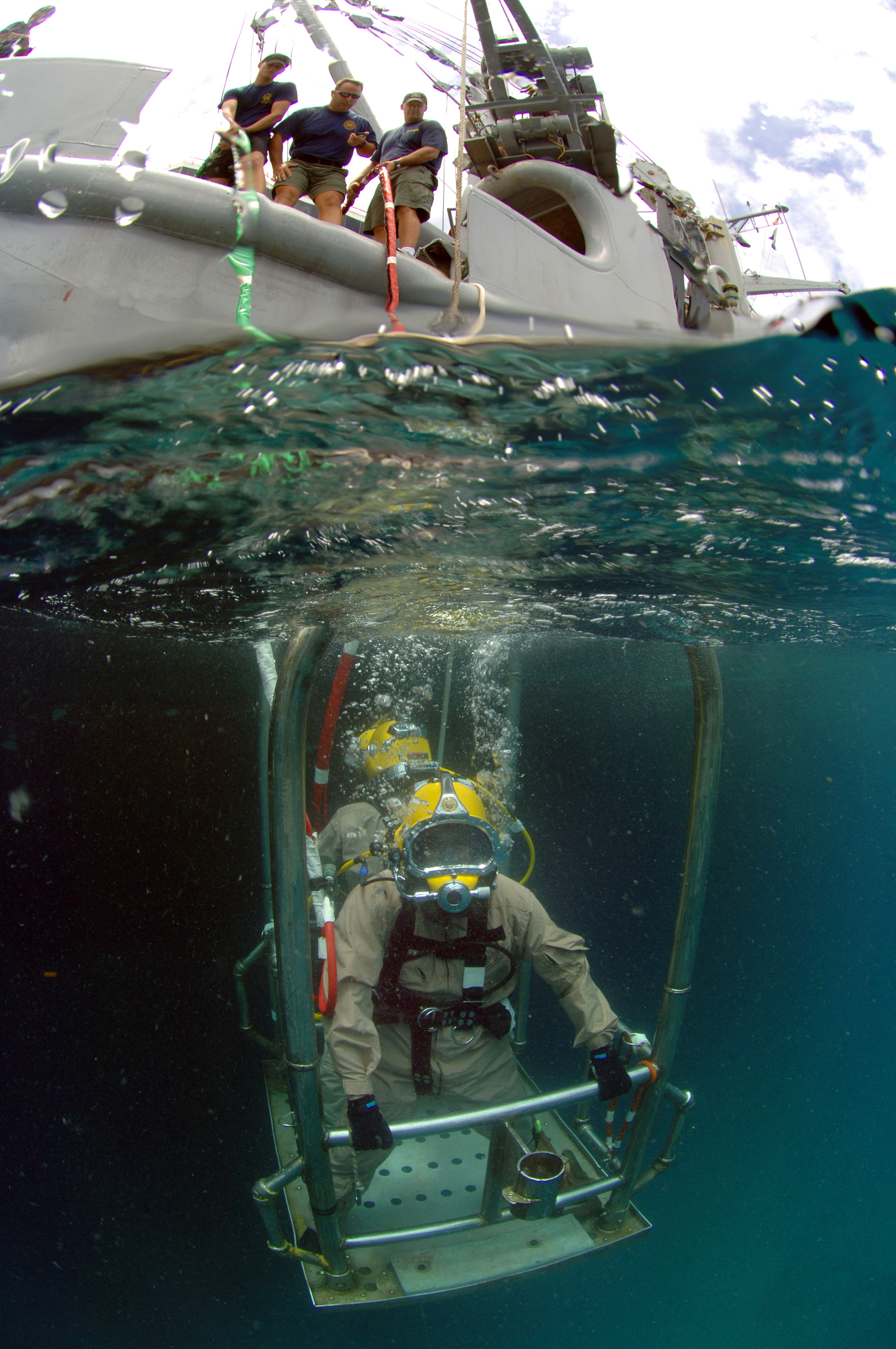
Surface-supplied divers riding a stage to the underwater workplace

The following index is provided as an overview of and topical guide to underwater diving: Links to articles and redirects to sections of articles which provide information on each topic are listed with a short description of the topic. When there is more than one article with information on a topic, the most relevant is usually listed, and it may be cross-linked to further information from the linked page or section.

Underwater diving can be described as all of the following:

- A human activity – intentional, purposive, conscious and subjectively meaningful sequence of actions. Underwater diving is practiced as part of an occupation, or for recreation, where the practitioner submerges below the surface of the water or other liquid for a period which may range between seconds to order of a day at a time, either exposed to the ambient pressure or isolated by a pressure resistant suit, to interact with the underwater environment for pleasure, competitive sport, or as a means to reach a work site for profit or in the pursuit of knowledge, and may use no equipment at all, or a wide range of equipment which may include breathing apparatus, environmental protective clothing, aids to vision, communication, propulsion, maneuverability, buoyancy control and safety equipment, and tools for the task at hand.

There are seven sub-indexes, listed here. The tables of content should link between them automatically:

- Index of underwater diving: A–C
- Index of underwater diving: D–E
- Index of underwater diving: F–K
- Index of underwater diving: L–N
- Index of underwater diving: O–R
- Index of underwater diving: S
- Index of underwater diving: T–Z

== O ==
Contents: Top	0–9	A	B	C	D	E	F	G	H	I	J	K	L	M	N	O	P	Q	R	S	T	U	V	W	X	Y	Z

Section contents: Topof section, Ob, Oc, Of, Om–On, Op, Or, Os–Ot, Ou, Ov, Ox

=== Ob ===
- Obligatory decompression stop – Pause in the ascent from a dive necessary to allow safe outgassing
- Observation bell – Closed diving bell used as an observation platform

=== Oc ===
Section contents: Topof section, Ob, Oc, Of, Om–On, Op, Or, Os, Ou, Ov, Ox

- Occupational diver – Person who dives underwater as part of their occupation
- Occupational diver training – Training of people employed as underwater divers
- Occupational diving – Underwater diving which is part of the job
- Occupational exposure limit – Upper limit on the acceptable concentration of a hazardous substance
- Occupational hazard – Hazard experienced in the workplace
- Occupational Health and Safety Act, 1993 – South African statutory law administered by the Department of Labour
- Occupational hygiene – Management of workplace health hazards
- Occupational safety and health, also known as occupational health and safety – Field concerned with the safety, health and welfare of people at work
- Ocean current – Directional mass flow of oceanic water
- Ocean Guardian – Personal electromagnetic field shark deterrent device
- Ocean stratification – Layering of ocean water due to density differences
- Oceanic Worldwide – American recreational scuba equipment manufacturer
- Octopus breathing – Emergency scuba skill
- Octopus demand valve, also known as octopus regulator – Secondary demand valve on a scuba regulator
- Ocular oxygen toxicity – Adverse effects of high oxygen partial pressure on the eyes

=== Of ===
Section contents: Topof section, Ob, Oc, Of, Om–On, Op, Or, Os–Ot, Ou, Ov, Ox

- Off-board gas – Feed gas for a rebreather supplied from an external cylinder
- Offshore commercial diving – Professional diving in support of the oil and gas industry
- Offshore construction – Installation of structures and facilities in a marine environment
- Offshore diving – Diving outside the territorial waters of a country
- Offshore survey – Discipline of hydrographic survey largely concerned with the oil industry
- Ohgushi's Peerless Respirator – Underwater breathing apparatus with bite-controlled gas supply valve

=== Om–On ===
Section contents: Topof section, Ob, Oc, Of, Om–On, Op, Or, Os–Ot, Ou, Ov, Ox

- Omitted decompression – Missed obligatory decompression stops
- Omitted decompression procedure – Procedure to reduce risk of developing decompression sickness
- On-board gas – Gas supply carried as integral part of equipment

=== Op ===
Section contents: Topof section, Ob, Oc, Of, Om–On, Op, Or, Os–Ot, Ou, Ov, Ox

- Open bell – Platform for lowering and lifting divers with an open-bottomed air space
- Open circuit breathing apparatus – Breathing apparatus where the exhaled gas is lost to the environment
- Open circuit demand helmet – Diving helmet which provides gas on inhalation and exhausts to the surroundings
- Open-circuit demand scuba – Breathing gas supply carried by the diver, supplied on inhalation, and vented to the water
- Open circuit diving – Diving mode where all exhaled gas is vented directly to waste
- Open-circuit surface-supplied diving – Gas management which discharges all gas to the environment after use
- Open lift bag – Underwater buoyant lifting device with open bottom
- Open ocean diving – Diving in deep water out of sight of land
- Open water (diving) – Unrestricted water with free vertical access to the surface
- Open Water Diver – Entry-level autonomous diver certification for recreational scuba diving
- Open-water diving – Diving with access to breathable air of the atmosphere
- OpenROV – Open-source remotely operated underwater vehicle
- Operation Algeciras – Argentine plan to sabotage a British warship in Gibraltar
- Operation Source – Second World War Royal Navy midget submarine attacks on heavy German warships in Norway
- Operation Thunderhead – American amphibious mission during the Vietnam War
- Operational Diving Division (SA Navy) – Diving component of the South African Navy's Maritime Reaction Squadron
- Operational safety – The absence of unacceptable risk in the presence of the associated hazards
- Operations manual – Authoritative document of how things should be done in an organisation
- Optimum scuba weighting – Weighting for scuba diving which works best most of the time

=== Or ===
Section contents: Topof section, Ob, Oc, Of, Om–On, Op, Or, Os–Ot, Ou, Ov, Ox

- Orca Edge – First commercially viable personal decompression computer
- Orinasal mask, also known as oral-nasal mask – Breathing mask that covers the mouth and the nose only

=== Os–Ot ===
- Osprey Reef – Submerged atoll northeast of Queensland, Australia
- Otic barotrauma – Pressure injury to the ear

=== Ou ===
Section contents: Topof section, Ob, Oc, Of, Om–On, Op, Or, Os–Ot, Ou, Ov, Ox

- Outline of recreational dive sites – Hierarchical outline list of articles about recreational dive sites
- Outline of underwater divers
- Outline of underwater diving – List of articles related to underwater diving grouped by topical relevance
- Out-of-gas emergency, also known as out-of-air emergency – Underwater diving incident involving loss of breathing gas supply
- Out-of-gas incident, also known as out-of-air incident – Underwater diving incident involving loss of breathing gas supply

=== Ov ===
Section contents: Topof section, Ob, Oc, Of, Om–On, Op, Or, Os–Ot, Ou, Ov, Ox

- Overfall – Dangerously steep and breaking seas due to currents over shallow obstructions
- Overconfidence effect – Personal cognitive bias
- Overhead environment, also known as overhead (diving) – Environment with a physical constraint to a direct vertical ascent to the surface
- Over-learning, also known as overlearning – Practicing newly acquired skills beyond the point of initial mastery
- Overpressure valve (rebreather loop) (OPV) – Pressure relief valve on a breathing loop

=== Ox ===
Section contents: Topof section, Ob, Oc, Of, Om–On, Op, Or, Os–Ot, Ou, Ov, Ox

- Oxycheq – Manufacturer and distributor of scuba equipment
- Oxygen analyser – Instrument to measure partial pressure of oxygen in a gas mixture
- Oxugen cell – Electro-galvanic fuel cell used for measuring oxygen concentration
- Oxygen cleaning – Removal of contaminants that might cause a fire hazard in an oxygen rich environment
- Oxygen compatibility – Usability in high-oxygen environments
- Oxygen decompression – Use of oxygen for accelerated decompression
- Oxygen diving – Underwater diving using oxygen as breathing gas
- Oxygen enriched air – Air with added oxygen
- Oxygen fraction – The molar or volumetric fraction of oxygen in a gas
- Oxygen narcosis – Narcotic effect of oxygen at high partial pressure
- Oxygen prebreathing – Procedure before hypobaric exposure to reduce risk of decompression sickness
- Oxygen service – Use in contact with high partial pressures of oxygen
- Oxygen tables designed for monoplace chambers – Hyperbaric oxygen protocols without air breaks
- Oxygen therapy – Use of oxygen as a medical treatment
- Oxygen tolerance test – Test for sensitivity to hyperbaric oxygen exposure
- Oxygen toxicity – Toxic effects of breathing oxygen at high partial pressures
- Oxygen toxicity seizure – Underwater diving emergency
- Oxygen window, also known as oxygen window in technical diving – Difference between the partial pressures of oxygen in arterial blood and body tissues

== P ==
Contents: Top	0–9	A	B	C	D	E	F	G	H	I	J	K	L	M	N	O	P	Q	R	S	T	U	V	W	X	Y	Z

Section contents: Top of section, Pa, Pe, Ph, Pi, Pn, Po, Pr, Ps, Pu, Py

- P2 – Svenskt Vrakskydd – Organization for preservation of shipwrecks in Swedish waters

=== Pa ===
- PADI Advanced Rebreather Diver – Minimum PADI certification meeting Rebreather Training Council standards
- PADI AWARE – International environmental nonprofit organization
- PADI Delayed Surface Marker Buoy Diver – Diver trained to deploy a decompression buoy from depth
- PADI Discover Scuba Diving – Introductory scuba experience without certification
- PADI Low Impact Diver – Training to mitigate low entry level competence standards
- PADI Open Water Diver – Entry level recreational diving certification
- PADI Open Water Scuba Instructor – Basic level recreational diving instructor qualification
- PADI Peak Performance Buoyancy – PADI diver with buoyancy control skill
- PADI Self-Reliant Diver – Recreational scuba qualification
- PADI training standard – Criteria governing the conduct and assessment of PADI training courses
- Panic – Sudden overwhelming sensation of fear
- Parachute lift bag – Open bottomed airtight bag used for underwater buoyant lifting when filled with air
- Partial pressure – Pressure of a component gas in a mixture
- Partial pressure blending – Gas blending based on pressure ratio of components
- Partial pressure vacancy – Physiological effect of oxygen metabolism on the total dissolved gas concentration in venous blood
- PASKAL – Special operations force of the Royal Malaysian Navy
- Passive addition semi-closed circuit rebreather, also known as passive addition SCR, passive addition rebreather – Dumps gas from the breathing circuit and makes up volume on demand
- Patent foramen ovale – A heart defect present at birth

=== Pe ===
Section contents: Top of section, Pa, Pe, Ph, Pi, Pn, Po, Pr, Ps, Pu, Py

- Peacock Springs – Karst flooded cave and spring system in Florida
- Pearl hunting – Collecting pearls from wild molluscs
- Pearling in Western Australia – Local aquaculture industry
- Pelagic Pressure Systems – Manufacturer of dive computers
- Pendulum rebreather – Configuration using biderctional gas flow
- Pendulum search – Diver search pattern
- Penetration dive – Dive under a physical barrier to a direct vertical ascent to the surface
- Penetration diving – Diving under a physical barrier to a direct vertical ascent to the surface
- Peress, Joseph Salim – Pioneering British diving engineer
- Performance Freediving International (PI) – Freediver training agency
- Perfusion – Passage of fluid through the circulatory or lymphatic system to an organ or tissue
- Permanent set – Plastic deformation
- Permeation – Penetration of a liquid, gas, or vapor through a solid
- Permit-to-work – Work safety management system
- Personal diving equipment – Underwater diving equipment worn by the diver
- Personal protective equipment – Equipment designed to help protect an individual from hazards

=== Ph ===
Section contents: Top of section, Pa, Pe, Ph, Pi, Pn, Po, Pr, Ps, Pu, Py

- Philippine Underwater Hockey Confederation – National sports association
- Phoenix International Holdings – Marine services company for underwater operations
- Physics of underwater diving – Aspects of physics which affect the underwater diver
- Physiological effects of the use of breathing apparatus
- Physiological response to water immersion – Also known as the diving response and mammalian diving reflex
- Physiology of decompression – Physiological basis for decompression theory and practice
- Physiology of diving adaptations – Adaptations of marine vertebrates to diving
- Physiology of human diving – Influences of the underwater environment on the physiology of human divers

=== Pi ===
Section contents: Top of section, Pa, Pe, Ph, Pi, Pn, Po, Pr, Ps, Pu, Py

- Piccard, Auguste – Swiss physicist, inventor, and explorer
- Pillar valve – Type of scuba cylinder valve
- Pinch point hazard – Mechanical hazard which may damage or injure by reducing a gap
- Pipeline end manifold (PLEM) – Termination of a rigid pipeline
- Pirelli (rebreather) – Oxygen rebreather manufacturer

=== Pn ===
Section contents: Top of section, Pa, Pe, Ph, Pi, Pn, Po, Pr, Ps, Pu, Py

- Pneumo-breathing – Emergency breathing skill in surface supplied diving
- Pneumofathometer – Instrument for measuring the depth of a diver by air pressure

=== Po ===
Section contents: Top of section, Pa, Pe, Ph, Pi, Pn, Po, Pr, Ps, Pu, Py

- Polespear – Basic rubber launched underwater fishing spear
- Police diving – Branch of professional diving carried out by police services
- Neal W. Pollock – Canadian researcher in diving physiology and hyperbaric medicine
- Pony bottle – Small independent scuba cylinder usually carried for emergency gas supply
- Pool part of the 2011 Finswimming World Championships – International competition in Hódmezővásárhely, Hungary
- Pool part of the 2013 Finswimming World Championships – International competition in Kazan, Russia
- Porpoise (rebreather) – Australian oxygen rebreather
- Porpoise (scuba gear) – Australian scuba manufacturer
- Poseidon Diving Systems – Swedish manufacturer of diving equipment
- Positive buoyancy – A tendency to float when immersed in a fluid
- Positive pressure breathing – Breathing gas which is at a slightly higher pressure than in the resting lung
- Positive pressure breathing apparatus – Equipment in which pressure insude the facepiece is always higher than ambient pressure
- Positive pressure open circuit breathing apparatus – Apparatus supplying gas at a pressure slightly above ambient
- Potable water diver – Person competent to dive in potable water systems
- Potable water diving – Underwater diving in potable water systems
- Powerhead – Specialized firearm used underwater that is fired when in direct contact with the target
- Power inflator – Low pressure gas supply valve for buoyancy compensator
- PowerSwim – Diver-powered propulsion device

=== Pr ===
Section contents: Top of section, Pa, Pe, Ph, Pi, Pn, Po, Pr, Ps, Pu, Py

- Pre-decompression hold time – Stabilising period between an excursion dive and the start of decompression
- Pre-dive briefing – Meeting of the dive team to discuss details before the diving operation
- Pre-dive checks – Checks done prior to entering the water for a dive
- Preparing the diving rebreather – Assembly and predive function tests
- Pressed Steel Tank – American manufacturer of seamless steel gas cylinders
- Pressure – Force distributed over an area
- Pressure distribution in a water wave – Hydrostatic pressure variation within a gravity wave
- Pressure reducing regulator – Pressure control valve that maintains the downstream pressure setting
- Pressure reduction regulator – Control valve that reduces and maintains the outlet pressure of a fluid
- Pressure swing adsorption – Method of gases separation using selective adsorption under pressure
- Pressure-tight zipper – Zip fastener capable of a seal across a gas pressure difference
- Pressure transmitter (diving) – Cylinder pressure transducer with wireless transmitter linked to dive computer
- Pressure Vessel for Human Occupancy, also known as pressure vessel for human occupation – Pressurised Equipment
- Primary demand valve – The second stage regulator that the diver normally uses
- Priz-class deep-submergence rescue vehicle – Russian submersibles
- Probabilistic decompression model – Models for decompression based on risk
- Professional Association of Diving Instructors (PADI) – Recreational diver training and certification agency
- Professional Divers' Association of Australia – Trade union
- Professional diver training – Training of candidates for registration as professional divers
- Professional diving, also known as occupational diving – Underwater diving where divers are paid for their work
- Professional Diving Instructors Corporation (PDIC) – Recreational diver training and certification agency
- Professional diving team – Support personnel for a professional dive
- Professional scuba diver – Person with skills and knowledge required for occupational scuba diving
- Professional scuba diving – Occupational diving using scuba
- Professional Technical and Recreational Diving – Diver certification agency
- Protection of Military Remains Act 1986 – UK legislation protecting wreckage of military ships and aircraft
- Protection of Wrecks Act 1973 – UK legislation on conservation of shipwrecks

=== Ps ===
Section contents: Top of section, Pa, Pe, Ph, Pi, Pn, Po, Pr, Ps, Pu, Py

- Psychological fitness to dive – Psychological fitness of a person to function safely underwater under pressure
- Psychological hazard – Aspects of the social environment associated with mental disorders
- Psychosocial hazard – Occupational hazard to one's psychological well-being
- Psychrometric constant – Relation of the partial pressure of water in air to temperature

=== Pu ===
Section contents: Top of section, Pa, Pe, Ph, Pi, Pn, Po, Pr, Ps, Pu, Py

- Public safety diver – Diver working in the public safety sector
- Public safety diver training – Training divers for public safety services
- Public safety diving – Underwater work done by law enforcement, rescue and search and recovery teams
- Pulmonary barotrauma – Lung over-pressure and squeeze injuries
- Pulmonary circulation – Part of the vertebrate circulatory system
- Pulmonary edema of immersion – Body fluid in the lungs while immersed
- Pulmonary oxygen toxicity – Lung injury due to nlong term exposure to high oxygen levels
- Pulmonary volutrauma – Lung injury due to over-expansion
- Purge button – Manual activation control of the demand valve
- Push-pull breathing system – System to recover used breathing gas and prepare it for re-use
- Push-pull diving system – Closed circuit free-flow breathing gas circulation system
- Push-pull helmet, also known as Push-pull diving helmet – Diving helmet using breathing gas recirculated from the bell or habitat atmosphere

=== Py ===
Section contents: Top of section, Pa, Pe, Ph, Pi, Pn, Po, Pr, Ps, Pu, Py

- Pyle In-water Recompression Table – Emergency treatment for decompression sickness
- Pyle stop – Type of short deep decompression stops in addition to the standard profile
- Pyle, Richard – American ichthyologist and scuba diver

== Q ==
Contents: Top	0–9	A	B	C	D	E	F	G	H	I	J	K	L	M	N	O	P	Q	R	S	T	U	V	W	X	Y	Z

- Quintana Roo Speleological Survey – Data repository for explored sites within the state of Quintana Roo

== R ==
Contents: Top	0–9	A	B	C	D	E	F	G	H	I	J	K	L	M	N	O	P	Q	R	S	T	U	V	W	X	Y	Z

Section contents: Top of section, Ra, Re, Ri–Rn, Ro, Ru

- R-2 Mala-class swimmer delivery vehicle – Underwater diver propulsion equipment

=== Ra ===
- Rack operator – Member of a surface-supplied diving team who operates the breathing gas panel
- Raid on Alexandria (1941) – Italian frogman raid on British warships
- Raid on Algiers – Italian frogman raid on Allied ships in Algiers harbour in 1942
- Rapid deployment lift bag – Underwater lifting bag with self-contained air supply
- Rash guard, also known as rash vest – Stretch garment for protection from abrasion, UV and stings
- Ratchet reel (diving) – Type of reel used by divers to deploy and recover line
- Ratio Computers – Italian manufacturer of technical dive computers
- Ratio decompression, also known as Ratio deco – Rule of thumb for estimating a decompression schedule for a given set of breathing gases
- Rawlins, John – Royal Navy officer and pioneer in the field of diving medicine

=== Re ===
Section contents Top of section, Ra, Re, Ri–Rn, Ro, Ru

- Rebreather – Portable apparatus to recycle breathing gas
- Rebreather ascents and descents – Loop volume and partial pressure control with changes in ambient pressure
- Rebreather Association of International Divers (RAID) – Recreational diver training and certification agency
- Rebreather bailout – Switching over to an alternative supply of breathing gas
- Rebreather diluent flush, also known as diluent flush, or dil flush – Replacing gas in the loop with fresh diluent
- Rebreather diver – Scuba diving qualification to use a rebreather
- Rebreather diving – Underwater diving using self contained breathing gas recycling apparatus
- Rebreather Education and Safety Association (RESA) – Organisation of rebreather manufacturers
- Rebreather endurance – The duration that a rebreather can adequately supply appropriate breathing gas
- Rebreather head-up display – User information interface always in view of the diver
- Rebreather instructor – Person certified to train and assess rebreather divers
- Rebreather loop – Ambient pressure breathing gas circuit
- Rebreather scrubber – Component that removes carbon dioxide from exhaled gas
- Rebreather Training Council (RTC) – Organisation to coordinate rebreather training standards
- Reclaim helmet – Diving helmet that returns exhaled gas through a hose for recycling
- Reclaim regulator – Diving regulator controlling flow of exhaled gas into low pressure exhaust return hose
- Reclaim valve – Backpressure regulator controlled relative to ambient pressure for breathing gas recovery
- Recompression (disambiguation) – Returning to a state of higher ambient pressure
- Recompression chamber – A hyperbaric chamber used to treat divers suffering from decompression illness
- Recovery breathing – Technique used by free divers on surfacing to reduce the risk of surface blackout.
- Recovery of a convulsing diver – Procedure for rescue of a convulsing scuba diver from underwater
- Recovery of an unresponsive diver – Procedure for rescue of a convulsing casualty from underwater
- Recreational dive – Underwater dive done for recreational purposes
- Recreational dive guiding – Underwater tour guide
- Recreational Dive Planner – Decompression table for divers
- Recreational dive sites – Places that divers go to enjoy the underwater environment
- Recreational diver certification – Certification as competent to dive to a specified standard
- Recreational diver certification agency – Agencies which issue certification for competence in recreational diving skills
- Recreational diver impact on reefs – Effects of scuba diving on the underwater environment
- Recreational diver training – Training process for people who do not dive at work
- Recreational diver – Person who engagesin underwater diving for entertainment
- Recreational diving – Diving for the purpose of leisure and enjoyment
- Recreational diving fatalities – Deaths occurring during scuba dives
- Recreational diving instructor – Person who trains and assesses recreational divers
- Recreational diving service provider – Tangible and intangible goods and services provision for recreational diving tourism
- Recreational diving tourism – Industry based on recreational diver travel
- Recreational nitrox – Scuba breathing gas of air enriched with up to 40% oxygen by volume
- Recreational scuba certification levels – Competence represented by recreational scuba certification
- Recreational scuba diving – Diving for leisure and enjoyment while using scuba equipment
- Recreational trimix diver – Certification to dive with normoxic trimix with equivalent narcotic depth 80 ft or less
- Reduced gradient bubble model – Decompression algorithm
- Redundancy (engineering) – Duplication of critical components to increase reliability of a system
- Redundant breathing gas supply – Scuba breathing gas reserved for an emergency
- Redundant diving equipment – Equipment carried in case of failure of the primary equipment
- Reef – Submerged ridge of rock, coral or other material
- Reef Ball Foundation – Non-profit organization to promote artificial reef building
- Reef Check – International NGO for reef conservation
- Reef diving – Recreational diving on a reef
- Reef hook – Tool used by a diver to grip a reef
- Reef Life Survey (RLS) – Marine life monitoring programme based in Hobart, Tasmania
- Refresher course – Training to update existing skills and knowledge
- Refresher training – Training to update existing skills and knowledge
- Refresher training (diving) – Checkout of skills or remedial training to bring skills back up to standard
- Regulator cage – Fitting on diving cylinder to protect the scuba regulator
- Regulator freeze, also known as regulator freezing and regulator icing – Underwater breathing apparatus malfunction
- Regulator malfunction – Failure modes for diving regulators
- Regulator necklace – Safety item for scuba diving,to keep the DV near the mouth
- Remotely operated underwater vehicle (ROUV or ROV) – Tethered underwater mobile device operated by a remote crew
- REMUS (AUV) – Autonomous underwater vehicle series
- Repetitive dive – Dive made while outgassing from a previous dive is incomplete
- Repetitive dive decompression – Ascent from a serial dive
- Repetitive group (diving), also known as repetitive group designation – System for estimating residual inert gas loading of a diver
- Repet-Up profile – Commercial diving multi-level dive profile
- Repex, also known as repetitive exposure – Repeated exposure to potentially toxic concentrations of oxygen in breathing gas
- Rescue bell – Diving bell for submarine rescue
- Rescue diver – Recreational scuba certification emphasising emergency response and diver rescue
- Rescue Diver – Recreational scuba certification emphasising emergency response and diver rescue
- Rescue sling – Device used for lifting a casualty
- Rescue tether – Equipment to facilitate a diver rescue
- Rescue ventilation – Assisted breathing to support life
- Reserve gas – Breathing gas reserved for contingencies
- Reserve gas supply (diving) – Breathing gas supply for diving use if main supply is compromised or used uo
- Reserve pressure (scuba) – Pressure of breathing gas intended for contingency use
- Reserve valve – Valve isolating access to reserve gas supply
- Residual inert gas tissue loading – Gas remaining in the tissues after decompression
- Residual nitrogen – Excess nitrogen remaining in body tissues after surfacing from a dive
- Residual nitrogen time – Estimate of excess nitrogen remaining in tissues before repetitive dive
- Resort diving – Introductory scuba diving experience
- Respiration (physiology) – Exchange of gases between environment and tissues
- Respiratory exchange ratio – Ratio between the metabolic production of carbon dioxide and the uptake of oxygen
- Respiratory gas exchange – Process by which gases diffuse through a biological membrane
- Respiratory interface – Facepiece of a breathing apparatus
- Respiratory quotient – Ratio of carbon dioxide produced by the body to oxygen consumed by the body
- Restriction (diving) – Space through which it is possible to pass with some difficulty
- Reverse kick (finning) – Finning technique to move backwards
- Reverse profile diving – Repeat dive which is deeper than the preceding dive
- Reverse squeeze – Failure of the Eustachian tubes to open during a reduction in ambient pressure
- Reversible myopic shift – Temporary short-sightedness due to an external cause

=== Ri–Rn ===
Section contents: Top of section, Ra, Re, Ri–Rn, Ro, Ru

- Rip current – Water current moving away from shore
- Risk assessment – Estimation of risk associated with exposure to a given set of hazards
- Risk control – Process in which identified risks are reduced or mitigated
- Risk management – Identification, evaluation and control of risks
- RN Diving Manual – Training and operations manual
- RNPL Therapeutic Decompression from a Helium-Oxygen Recompression – Recompression protocol for treating decompression sickness

=== Ro ===
Section contents Top of section, Ra, Re, Ri–Rn, Ro, Ru

- Rock bottom gas planning – Scuba gas planning based on a planned dive profile
- Rocky reef – Natural reef of rock
- Röjdykare – Clearance divers of the Swedish Navy
- ROUV – Remotely operated underwater vehicle
- ROV KIEL 6000 – Remotely operated undersea vehicle
- ROV PHOCA – Remotely operated underwater vehicle of the COMANCHE type
- ROV Supervisor – A senior ROV pilot appointed to supervise the ROV team
- Rouquayrol–Denayrouze – French manufacturer of standard diving equipment and an early demand regulator
- Royal Australian Navy School of Underwater Medicine (RANSUM) – Unit based in Sydney, Australia
- Royal Engineers – Engineering arm of the British Army
- HMS Royal George (1756)#Salvage attempts – 100-gun first-rate Royal Navy ship of the line (1756) – Early salvage operation using bells and surface supplied divers
- Royal Naval Physiological Laboratory model – Diffusion limited model for gas transfer from capillaries into tissues
- Royal Navy 1943 Recompression Treatment Procedure – Recompression protocol for treating decompression sickness
- Royal Navy ships diver – Category of underwater diver in the Royal Navy
- Royal Navy Table 51 – Air Recompression Therapy – Recompression protocol for treating decompression sickness
- Royal Navy Table 52 – Air Recompression Therapy – Recompression protocol for treatment of decompression sickness 2025-08-01 11:29
- Royal Navy Table 53 – Air Recompression Therapy – Recompression protocol for treating decompression sickness
- Royal Navy Table 54 – Air Recompression Therapy – Recompression protocol for treating decompression sickness
- Royal Navy Table 55 – Air Recompression Therapy – Recompression protocol for treating decompression sickness
- Royal Navy Table 61 – Oxygen Recompression Therapy – Recompression protocol for treating decompression sickness
- Royal Navy Table 62 – Oxygen Recompression Therapy – Recomptession protocol for treating decompression sickness
- Royal Navy Table 71 – Modified Air Recompression Table – Recompression Protocol for treating decompression sickness
- Royal Navy Table 72 – Modified Air Recompression Therapy – Recompression protocol for treating decompression sickness
- Royal Navy Table 81 – Emergency therapy in the water – Emergency field treatment for decompression sickness

=== Ru ===
Section contents: Top of section, Ra, Re, Ri–Rn, Ro, Ru

- Rubicon Foundation – American non-profit foundation
- Rule of thirds (diving) – Rule of thumb for scuba gas management
- Russian commando frogmen – Tactical scuba diving unit
- Russian deep submergence rescue vehicle AS-28 – Priz-class deep-submergence rescue vehicle of the Russian Navy
- Russian submarine AS-34 – Priz-class deep-submergence rescue vehicle
- Russian submarine Losharik – Russian deep-water nuclear submarine

Contents: Top	0–9	A	B	C	D	E	F	G	H	I	J	K	L	M	N	O	P	Q	R	S	T	U	V	W	X	Y	Z

== See also ==
- Outline of underwater diving – List of articles related to underwater diving grouped by topical relevance
- Glossary of underwater diving terminology
