= Potable water diving =

Underwater diving in potable water systems

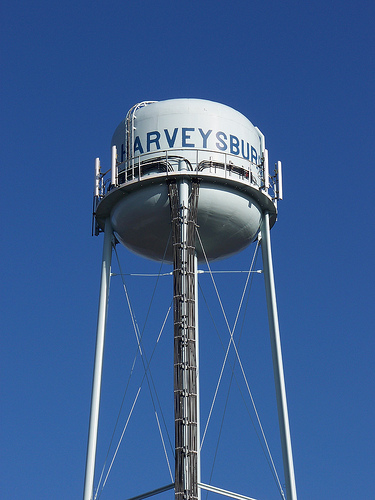
Inspection of the interior of a municipal water tower requires specialized training and safety equipment.

Potable water diving is diving inside a tank that is used for potable water. This is usually done for inspection and cleaning tasks. A person who is trained to do this work may be described as a potable water diver. The risks to the diver associated with potable water diving are related to the access, confined spaces and outlets for the water. The risk of contamination of the water is managed by isolating the diver in a clean dry-suit and helmet or full-face mask which are decontaminated before the dive.

== Scope ==
Divers can inspect water storage tanks, towers and clearwells without draining them or taking them out of service. The work is classified as commercial diving and diver qualifications, equipment and dive team composition will generally be regulated. Using a specially equipped pump or airlift system the diver can remove loose sediment without damaging painted surfaces. This allows the chlorine in the system to function more effectively. Divers are an effective means to clean and inspect potable water storage tanks because all of the maintenance can be done while the tank remains in-service and full of water, though it may be necessary to close all inlet and outlet valves during the operation as they may present an unacceptable pressure difference hazard, and most of the interior surfaces of the tank can be easily accessed.

== Hazards ==
Diving in a confined space presents specific hazards related to the possibility of an unbreathable atmosphere above the water surface, and tight access openings. Large tanks and water towers present hazards of access by ladder and working at height. The recovery of an unconscious diver can be complicated by inaccessibility and special extrication equipment will be needed on site to deal with this possibility. Diving teams may require confined space training and working at heights certification and must follow the appropriate standards or code of practice for this work. The diver should wear a diving harness, connected to a safety rope, so that in case of an emergency the dive tender can pull the diver up. Diving contractors always need to check the safety legislation appropriate to their local jurisdiction, and perform a job safety analysis for the specific site.

Differential pressure hazards are also usually present in operational storage tanks, and a lockout-tagout procedure for outlets is normally required to minimise the risk.

== Equipment ==
Diving in potable water uses the same type of equipment that would be used for diving in contaminated water, and for a similar reason. It is necessary to prevent contamination, but in this case it is the diving medium which must not be contaminated, as decontamination takes place before the diver enters the water. The equipment used should be dedicated to this application to minimise the contamination risk. On the other hand, a leak into the suit is of little consequence. Wireless communications do not work well in metal and concrete structures, so hard-wired diver telephone systems are the standard. Umbilicals should have as little place to trap contaminants as reasonably practicable - umbilicals held together by twisting the components like laid rope are preferred to umbilicals held together by tape or a casing. Gas supply and the control point for communications and gas control may have to be at some distance from the access opening, so communications between team members is important.

A hoist system is often necessary as a means for recovering an unconscious diver from the enclosed space of the tank. Simple tripod frames are commonly used to support the hoist system over the access opening. Other hoisting systems may be used, providing that they do not unduly risk contaminating the water. The diver's harness must be suitable for lifting the diver out of the water without further injury, in a posture that allows the diver to be hoisted out through the access opening.

== Regional requirements ==
In the USA commercial diving operations require at least one trained tender, a diver, and a supervisor. In some other countries a standby diver is required at all professional diving operations. Surface-supplied air with two-way voice communications with the diver and a safety rope are preferred and in some jurisdictions may be obligatory. In the US the Occupational Safety & Health Administration regulation 29 CFR Part 1910, Subpart T allows scuba with a rope for basic communications.
