= Recompression =

Recompression is the process of returning to a state of higher ambient pressure. Often associated with underwater diving and compressed air work, but also relevant to aeronautics and space flight:

- In therapeutic recompression, a form of hyperbaric medicine, returning a diver or compressed air worker to pressure after an ascent from a dive or decompression from a pressurised workplace as treatment for manifestation of decompression illness.
- In-water recompression as emergency treatment for decompression sickness,
- In surface decompression, returning a diver to pressure within five minutes of surfacing when decompression is planned to be done by this method, or as a precautionary measure for omitted decompression to prevent decompression sickness from developing.
- For omitted decompression, returning the diver to depth if there are no symptoms developing, to perform the omitted decompression procedure.
