= Lifting bag =

Airtight bag used for underwater buoyant lifting when filled with air

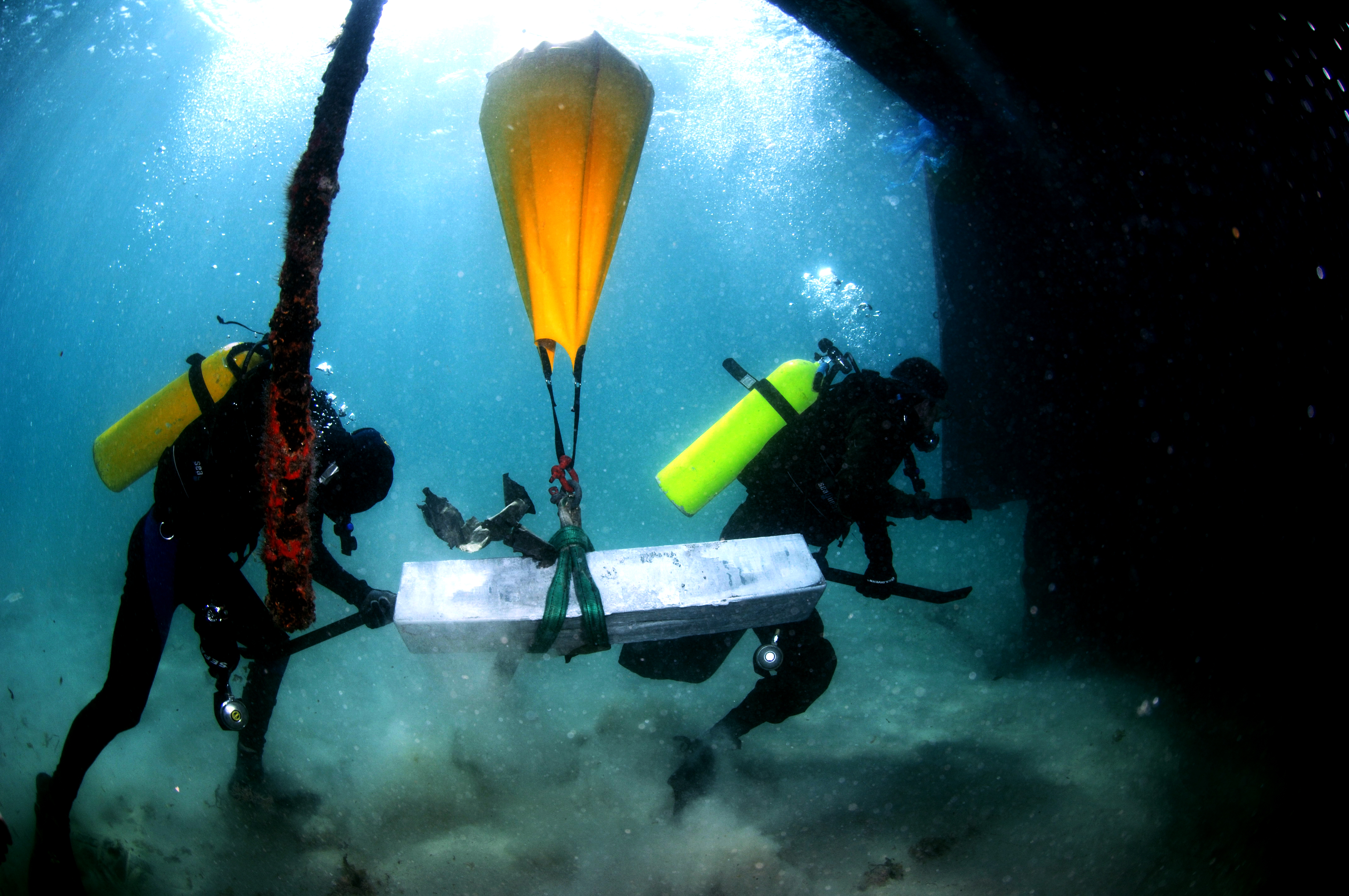
- Israeli Navy Underwater Missions Unit transfers equipment using lifting-bags
- Uses: Lifting heavy objects underwater

A lifting bag is an item of diving equipment consisting of a robust and air-tight bag with straps, which is used to lift heavy objects underwater by means of the bag's buoyancy. The heavy object can either be moved horizontally underwater by the diver or sent unaccompanied to the surface.

Lift bag appropriate capacity should match the task at hand. If the lift bag is grossly oversized a runaway or otherwise out of control ascent may result. Commercially available lifting bags may incorporate dump valves to allow the operator to control the buoyancy during ascent, but this is a hazardous operation with high risk of entanglement in an uncontrolled lift or sinking. If a single bag is insufficient, multiple bags may be used, and should be distributed to suit the load.

There are also lifting bags used on land as short lift jacks for lifting cars or heavy loads or lifting bags which are used in machines as a type of pneumatic actuator which provides load over a large area. These lifting bags of the AS/CR type are for example used in the brake mechanism of rollercoasters.

== Physics of buoyant lifting ==
The volume of the bag determines its lifting capacity: each litre of air inside the bag will lift a weight of 1 kilogram, or each cubic foot will lift about 62 pounds. For example, a 100-litre (3.5 cu ft) bag can lift a 100-kilogram (220 lb) underwater object.

A partially filled bag will accelerate as it ascends because the air in the bag expands as the pressure reduces on the ascent, following Boyle's law, increasing the bag's buoyancy, whereas a full bag will overflow or blow off excess volume and maintain the same volume and buoyancy providing it does not descend. A bag which leaks sufficiently to start sinking will lose volume to compression and become less buoyant in a positive feedback loop until stopped by the bottom.

=== Breakout ===
The force required to lift a submerged object from the bottom can be split into two main components:

- Apparent weight, which is the weight of the object less the buoyancy of its displacement.
- Breakout forces due to embedment in the bottom, which can be negligible, or in some cases the major part of the load.

Once the object has broken free of the bottom, only the apparent weight remains, and a controlled lift requires a way of managing the sudden decrease of resistance to the lifting force. There are three basic ways this can be done:

- Use of mechanical or hydraulic excavation to loosen the sediments holding the load.
- Use of a "Dead Man Anchor" - a large heavy weight - and restraining cable to prevent the bag from moving away too far, so that the buoyancy can be corrected to more closely match the load.
- Use of shallow bags with long cables to the load to provide breakout, which will only lift a short distance before surfacing, after which the load can be lifted further by staged lifts or direct lift by close-coupled bags.

=== Stability of the load ===
Once a load is lifted off the substrate, it will rotate until the centre of gravity is in the position of lowest potential energy. If it is suspended from a single point, the apparent centre of gravity (corrected for inherent buoyancy) will be directly below the lift point. If it is undesirable for the load to rotate by a large angle as it leaves the bottom, the lifting point must be chosen to allow for this effect, and a multi-part sling or spreader bar may be needed, and it may be necessary to secure slings so they do not slip.

== Types and construction ==
Underwater lifting bags are lifting equipment and as such may be required to comply with safety standards.

=== Open lift bags (parachute lift bags) ===
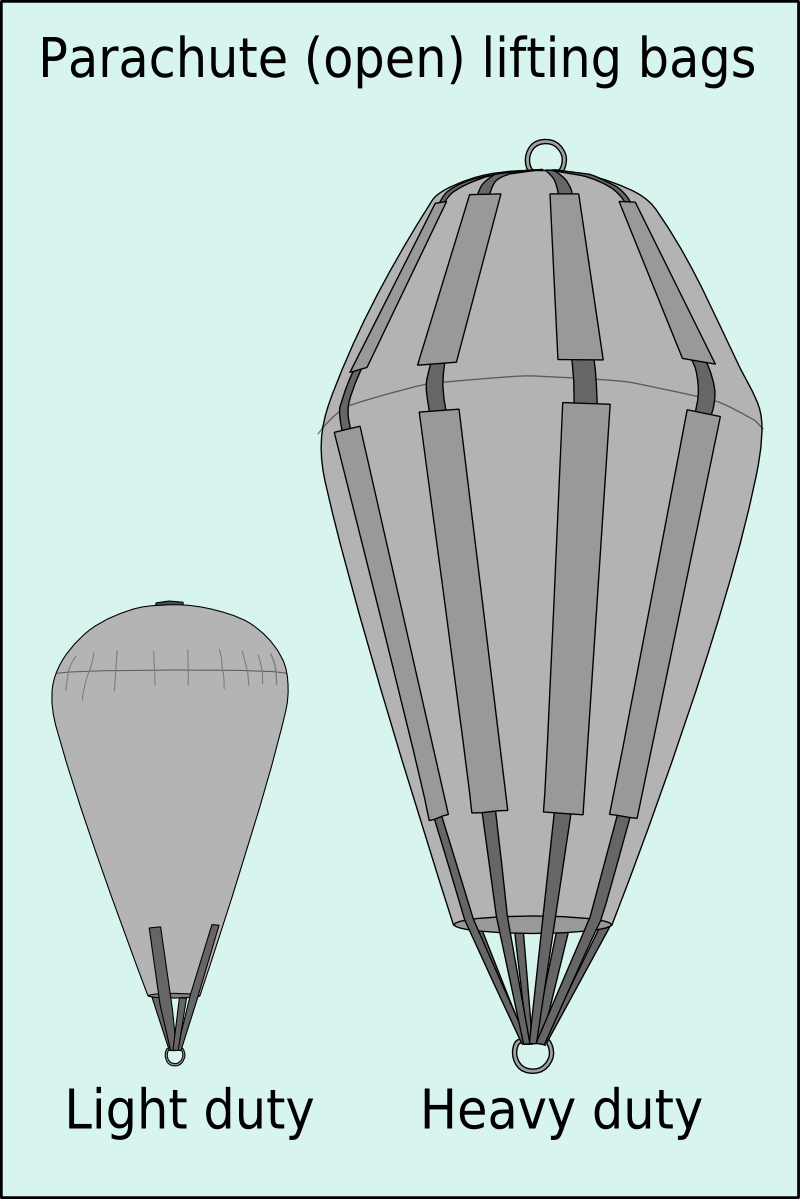
Open lift bags

Parachute lift bags are open at the bottom. When full any extra or expanding air will spill out. The shape of an open lifting bag should distribute the volume in a vertical rather than a horizontal direction so that the open end of the bag always remains underwater. If the open end reaches the surface, air will escape from the bag and it may sink.

The simplest version are two-sided bags, either joined round the edges or folded and joined along two sides. Webbing straps may be stitched to doubler patches which are then glued or welded to the bag on light duty bags, but on large and heavy duty bags there are usually strips of bag material bonded to the bags which form flat retaining tubes for the webbing which is threaded through the tubes and may be withdrawn for maintenance and inspection. heavy duty open bags are generally conical with a domed top or a reversed truncated cone top, and may have several straps from the lifting point at the bottom, through the guide tubes on the sides, to a crown ring of webbing or steel at the top, to spread the load evenly over the fabric of the bag.

Parachute lift bags cannot be overfilled and are suitable for lifts where there is a large pressure change, and where it may be necessary to capsize (invert) the bag to stop a runaway lift.

Some lift bags can be converted from open to closed by screwing a cover onto the bottom opening.

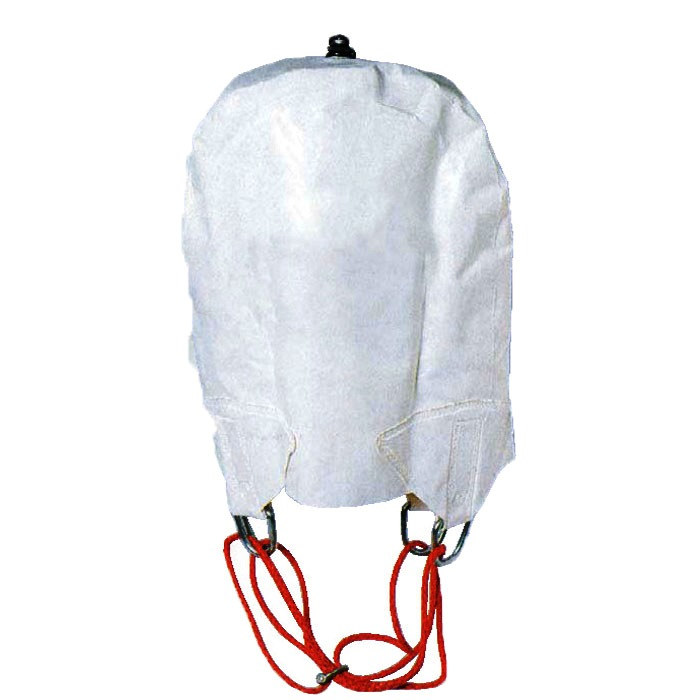
Open (parachute) lift bag.

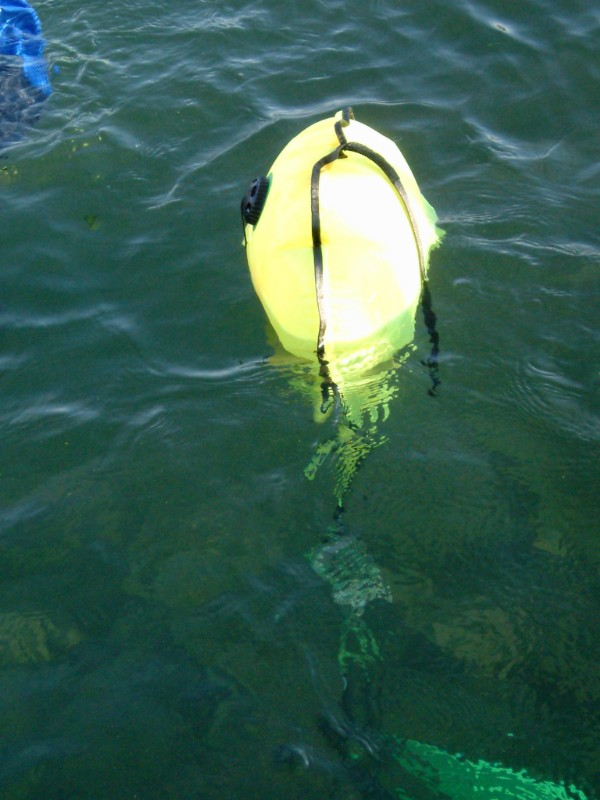
Small recreational grade lift bag.

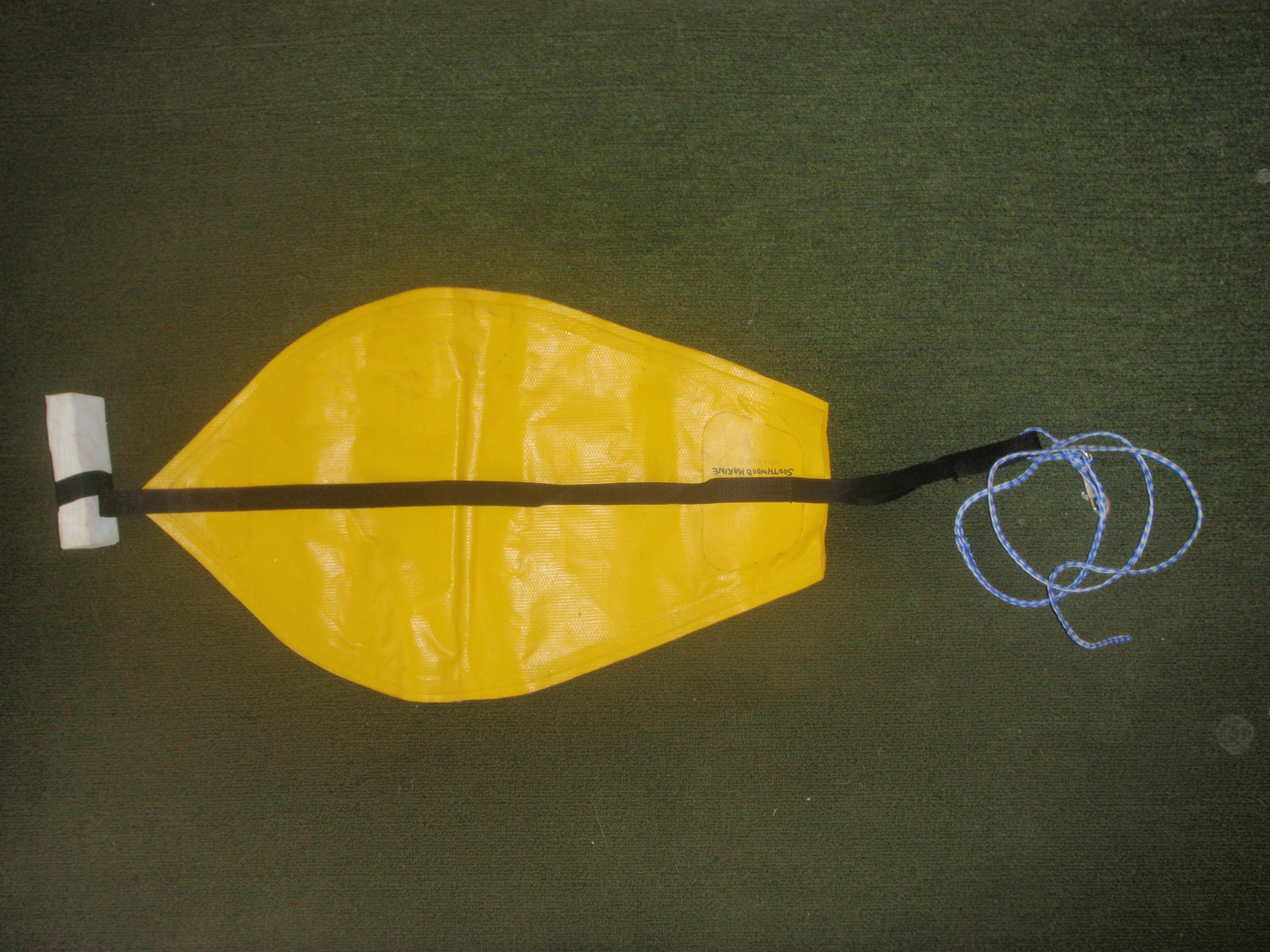
Medium duty 50 kg lift bag

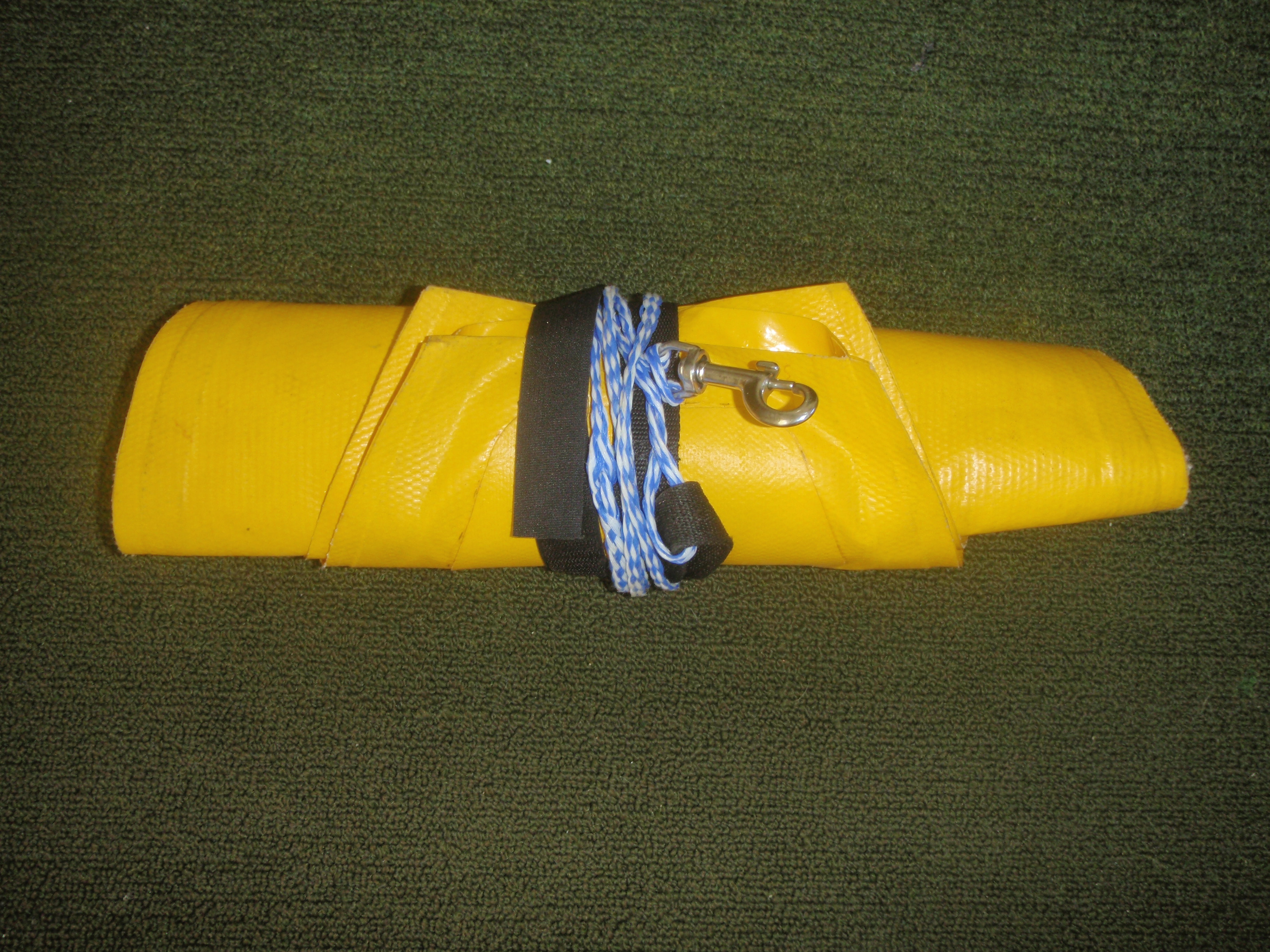
Small Lift bag rolled up for transport

==== Propeller lifting bags ====
Installation and removal of propellers is a specialised application where there is usually very little clearance above the load, which is usually at least partly underneath a vessel. Lift bags for this application partly enclose the propeller when in use, and are required to hold the propeller in the correct alignment for fitting to the shaft. It may be necessary to ballast the lower blade to keep the propeller upright. and details of the rigging will depend on the precise geometry of the propeller, such as blade aspect ratio, skew, and number of blades. The propeller lift bag will cover the upper part of the propeller, but cannot project below the line of the top of the shaft. It will support the propeller by at least two blades, for stability, and the propeller will generally by slung with a gap at the top, for maximum tip clearance. The bag may be shaped with a relatively horizontal top or a curve to follow the blade disc. Attachment to the blades must be on both sides for stability, and the slings must not harm the blade surfaces or damage the leading or trailing edge.

=== Closed lift bags (camels) ===
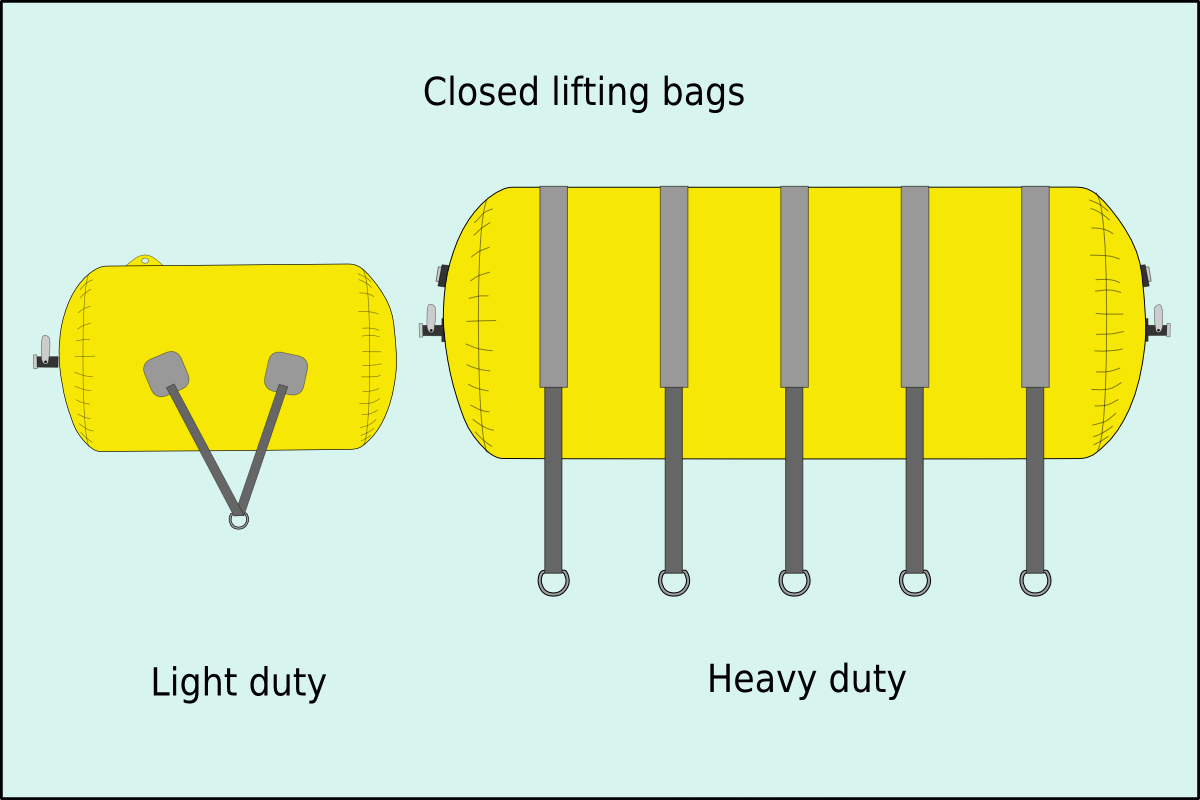
Light and heavy duty closed lifting bags

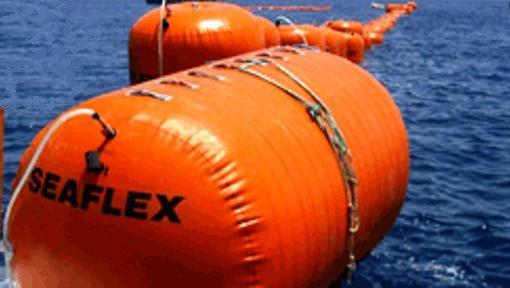
Closed lift bag (camel)

Closed lift bags have an overpressure valve to prevent internal pressure from exceeding ambient pressure by more than a set amount (around 10kPa, or 1msw) Closed lift bags are intended for use at or near the surface, as they retain the air even in rough seas. They are available in several configurations, including horizontal cylinder, vertical cylinder, teardrop and pillow.

=== Rapid deployment ===
Rapid deployment lift bags have a scuba cylinder mounted on the outside which contains sufficient air to inflate the bag at a specified depth. The bag can be attached to the load and when ready, the valve is opened and the diver swims clear while the gas is released into the lift bag.

=== Dump valves ===
Dump valves are used to release air from the bag when in the water. They can be operated manually at the valve by a diver or may be remotely operated by a pull-cord, which may be operated by a diver or attached to a weight which will automatically open the valve if the weight is lifted off the bottom. Some dump valves can be operated in both these ways. One system operates by pressing on the top or pulling a line attached to the bottom to actuate the spring-loaded valve. The dump valve may be a screw-in quick change system, and the spring tension may be adjustable.

== Use ==
=== Dynamic lifts ===
When the empty lift bag is attached to the load and the lift is made by controlling the volume of inflation air it is referred to as a dynamic lift.

==== Direct lift ====
The bag or set of bags is used to lift the load directly to the surface. This is simple, but there is a risk if the lift bag is too large and cannot be vented fast enough the lift may get out of control and ascend so fast that the bag breaks the surface, capsizes and collapses, losing so much air that it then cannot support the weight of the load, and will then sink back to the bottom. If there is a marker buoy attached it will at least not be lost. A lift bag which is only slightly larger than needed to support the load will ascend more slowly, and is less likely to capsize at the surface, as excess air will be spilled continuously during the ascent.

==== Staged lift ====
Lift bags are used to bring the load up in stages: a long chain or sling is used to connect the load to a lift bag just below the surface, which is filled to break out the load and lift it until the bag reaches the surface, then a second bag is used to bring the load up further. This procedure continues until the load has been raised sufficiently. Advantages of this method are a more controlled lift, the facility to use a larger capacity for initial breakout without risk of a runaway. Disadvantages include the requirement for divers to work on or near the lifting gear when under load.

=== Buoyancy assisted lift ===
The lift is controlled by a line from the surface vessel, and the load is reduced by a lift bag with a volume too small to support the weight of the load when full. This allows a faster lift by the winch. The lifting gear must be capable of supporting the load if the bag fails, or must be arranged to fail safely.

A buoyancy assisted lift is a common procedure for recreational divers to assist the recovery of the shotline or anchor, which would otherwise be pulled up manually. A small lift bag attached to the shot is partially filled by the last diver to leave the bottom, and after surfacing the crew pull up the line and the air in the bag expands as it ascends, providing more assistance to the crew. In this application a runaway lift is not usually a problem, and the bag size is not critical.

=== Static lifts ===
Lift bags also can be used for static lifts, where the bag is anchored in place by rigging, and used as a lifting point with very high buoyancy compared to the load, which is then lifted in a controlled manner using a purchase or chain block or other suitable lifting device.

=== Rigging lift bags ===
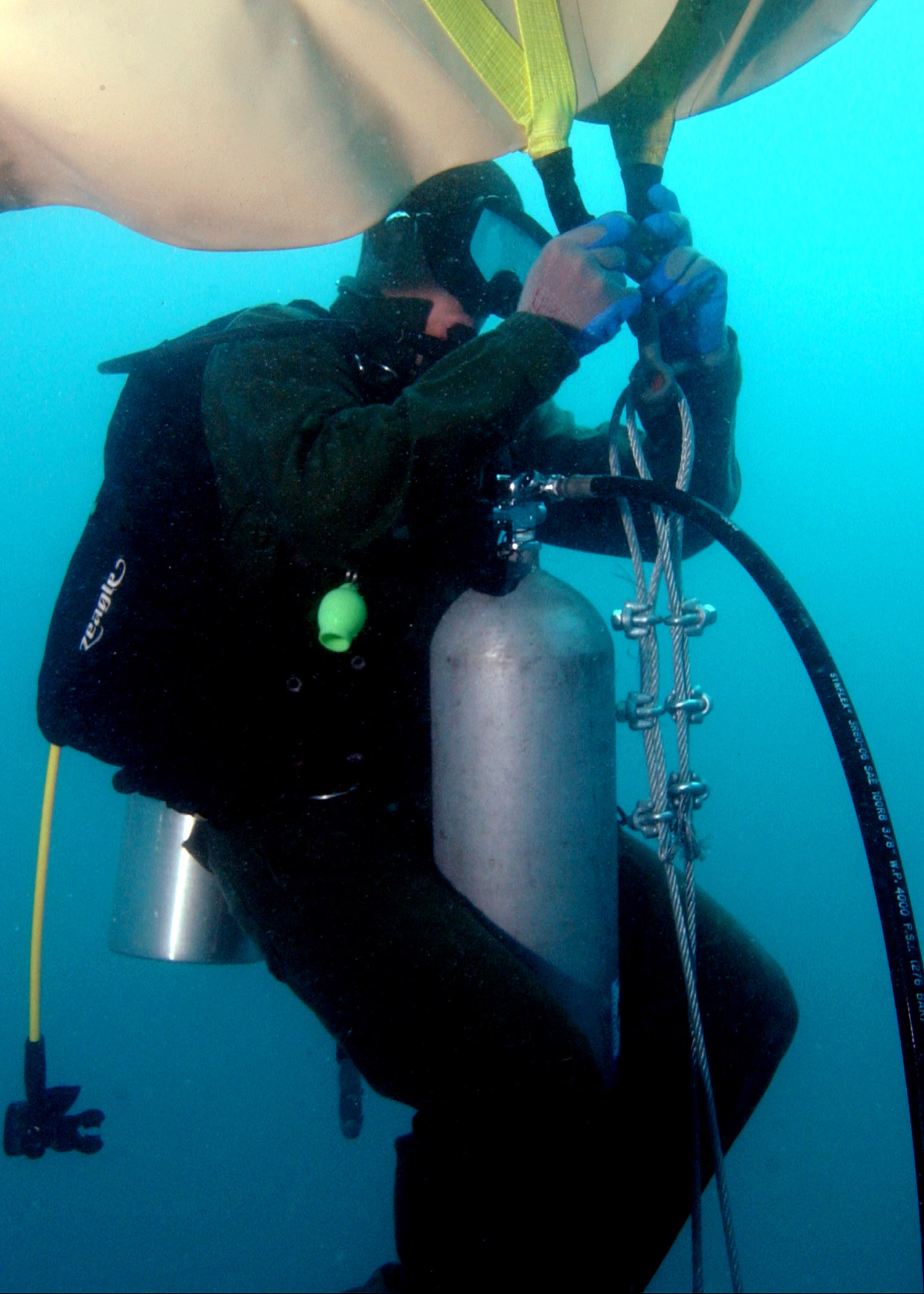
Diver rigging a lift bag for a heavy lift

Lift bags can not be over inflated, and can not normally exert a static buoyant force greater than their safe working load (SWL), however the rigging can be subjected to snatch loads, which can be caused by several factors.

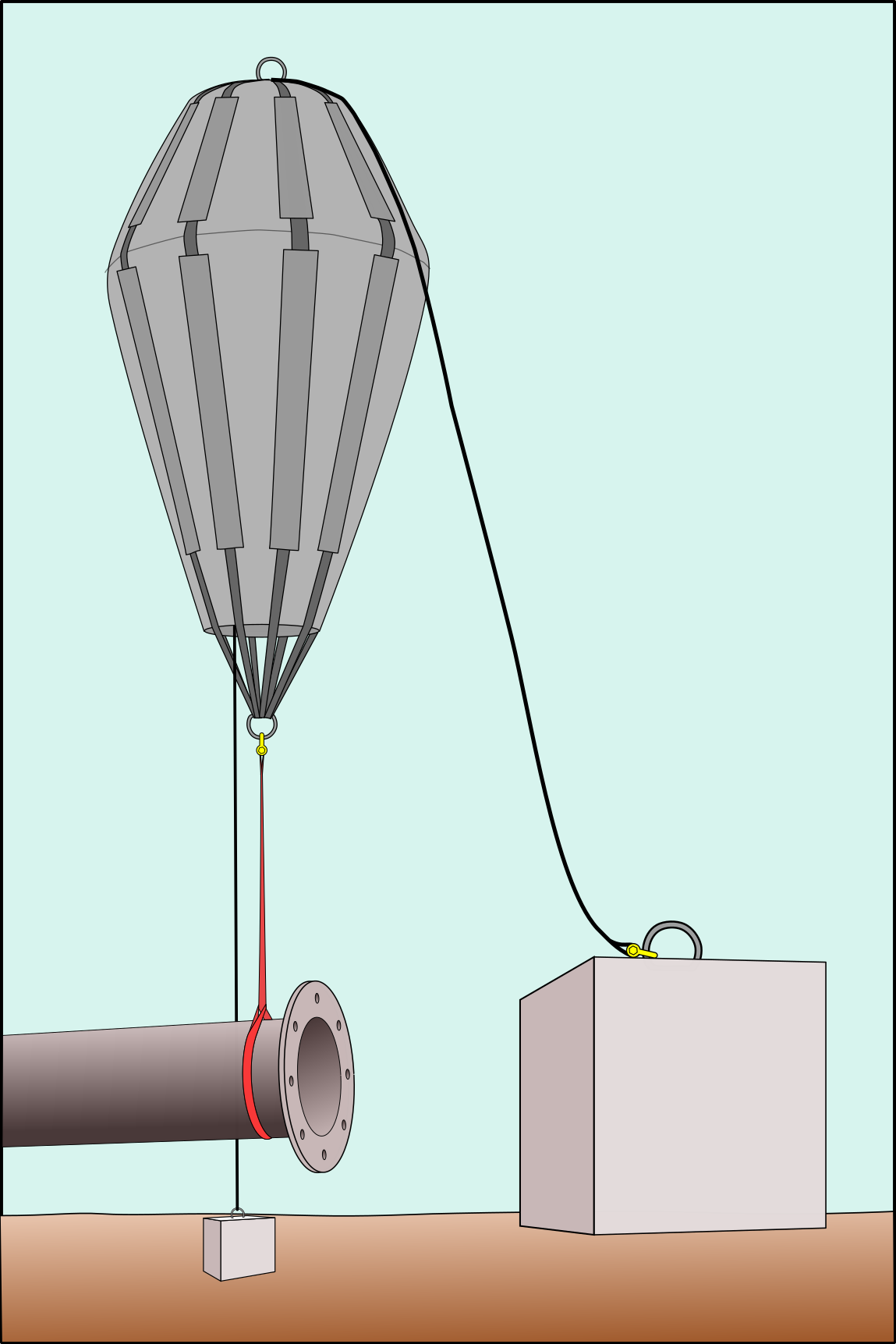
Parachute lift bag rigged with weighted dump line, dead man anchor and tripping line

- When the bag is used in shallow water and surge or wave action causes rapid changes in dynamic loading, by pulling the bag from side to side
- When the bag has lifted the load to the surface and the bag is subjected to vertical wave action
- When the lift bag is incorrectly rigged
- When the lift bag is snagged, then breaks free to be snubbed when the slack is taken up.
- When the load is partly supported by a lifting cable and there is a sudden variation on the tension in the cable due to vessel movement or cable slip.

When lifting with more than one bag, allowance should be made for reduced filling capacity if bags are attached in such a way that they press against each other.

Incorrect rigging can cause load concentration on attachment points which may exceed the SWL

An inverter or capsizing line can be attached to the top of the bag. This line should be long enough and strong enough to attach to an independent anchor point so that if the lift bag or rigging fails the bag will be inverted and the air will escape, preventing a runaway lift. This procedure is generally used for short-distance transport near the bottom, as when aligning large components for assembly. With this method the load will generally hold the bag in the upright position, so the tripping line may be subjected to considerable load and the bag may not invert. An inverter line can also be attached to the load, so it will capsize the bag if it breaks free of the load, but this will not stop a runaway lift, and a holdback line is used for this purpose.

A holdback line is used to prevent the lift bag and load from floating away when used for short distance lifts at the bottom. The holdback is attached to the lifting ring of the bag, or to the load, and should be attached by a strong cable to an anchor point it cannot lift. The SWL of the holdback should be at least equal to the lifting capacity of the bag. A holdback and inverter are often used together.

A spreader bar may be used to distribute the lifting load more evenly between bags or along the load.

When filling bags, if each bag is completely filled before starting to fill the next bag, it is less likely that a runaway will be initiated, as only one of the bags can increase lift as it ascends. This will be the last bag, and the divers will be monitoring it most carefully while they are filling it, so will be more likely to react in time to regain control of the lift.

A weighted dump line will automatically start open the valve to start dumping excess air if the weight is lifted off the bottom. This will stop the lift from ascending any further if the dump valve releases air fast enough. When the weight is lowered back to the bottom by the sinking load, the valve will close again, and should hold the load steady. The stability of this system depends on the preload of the valve spring and the size of the valve opening.

=== Filling lift bags ===
The amount of air required for a lift bag depends on the apparent weight of the load and the depth of the bag. Approximately 1 m^{3} of air at ambient pressure is required per tonne of lift. Free air volume follows Boyle's law, and is proportional to absolute ambient pressure in bar or ata.

For example: A 5 tonne lift with the bags to be filled at 20m, requires 5m^{3} of air at 3 bar, which is 15m^{3} at surface pressure.

Filling air is usually supplied from the surface from a low pressure compressor, but for small lifts the diver may carry a cylinder of air for the purpose. It is considered bad practice in some jurisdictions to fill a lift bag from the diver's breathing gas cylinder, particularly if the diver has decompression obligations or only one cylinder as the risk of using up too much air and leaving the diver without sufficient air for a safe ascent is considered unacceptable.

Bags can be inflated from a safer distance by use of an air-lance, a rigid pipe which can be inserted into the opening of the bag.

=== Hazards of use ===
- Snagging of the diver or diver's umbilical or lifeline in the lifting equipment, resulting in an uncontrolled rapid ascent.
- Using too much air from a scuba diver's breathing gas supply, resulting in an out of air incident.
- Using too much volume in the lift bags, resulting in a positive feedback expansion on ascent and a runaway lift.
- Leaks in lift bags, causing loss of buoyancy and sinking of the load after lifting. The load may then sink increasingly rapidly as the air in the bags compresses, and may be a hazard to divers below or working on the load at the surface, or the load may be lost.
- Unbalanced attachment of lifting gear may cause the load to be unstable once lifted free of the bottom. subsequent capsize or shifting of the load may break it free of the rigging, or damage the load or the lift bag. Similarly, poorly chosen or inadequate lifting points may result in overstressing the cargo and causing damage.

=== Marking the lift ===
If there is a significant risk of the bag losing buoyancy and sinking again with the load, a surface marker can be attached that will remain at the surface and mark the new position of the load so that it can be recovered again. The marker buoy line should be long enough to reach the surface if the load sinks anywhere in the vicinity.

== Securing the load at the surface ==
Once at the surface, the load may be secured by adding more buoyancy, lifting on board a vessel or other method.

== Gallery ==
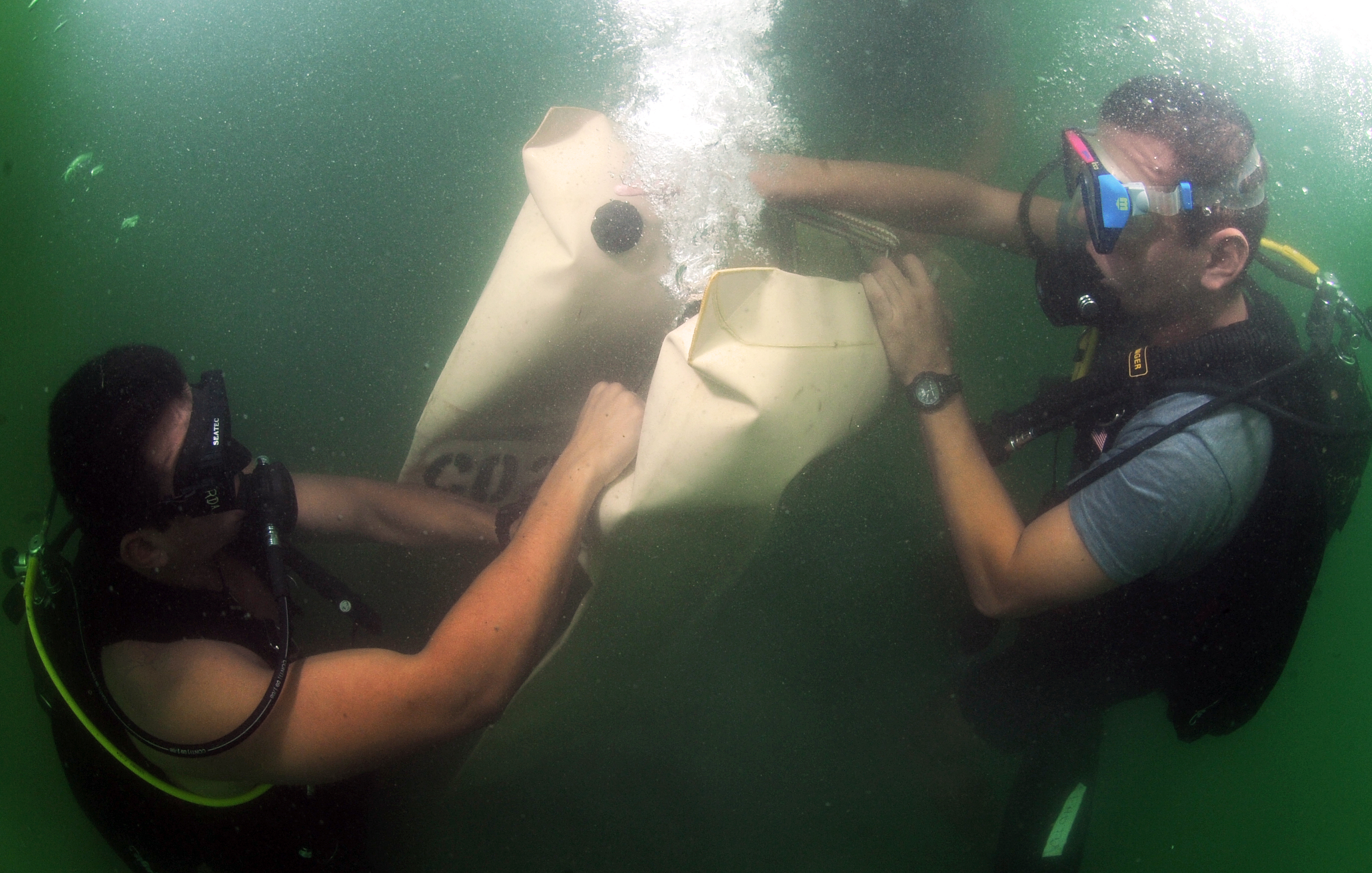
Divers releasing air from a lift bag underwater.

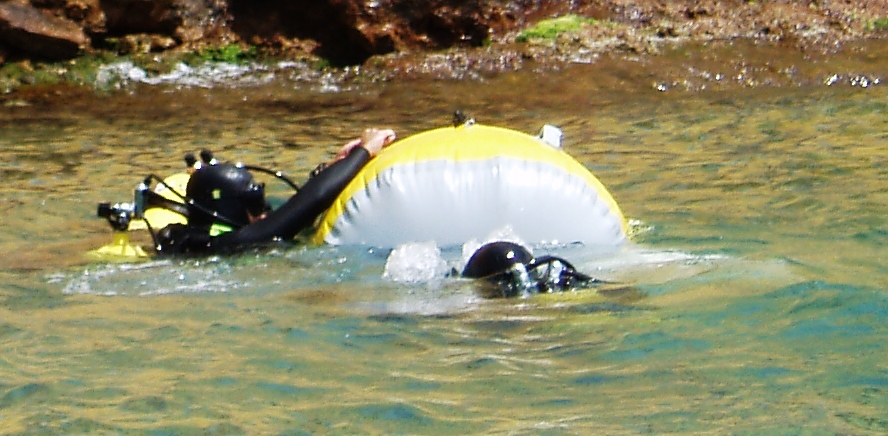
Divers on the surface with lift bags.

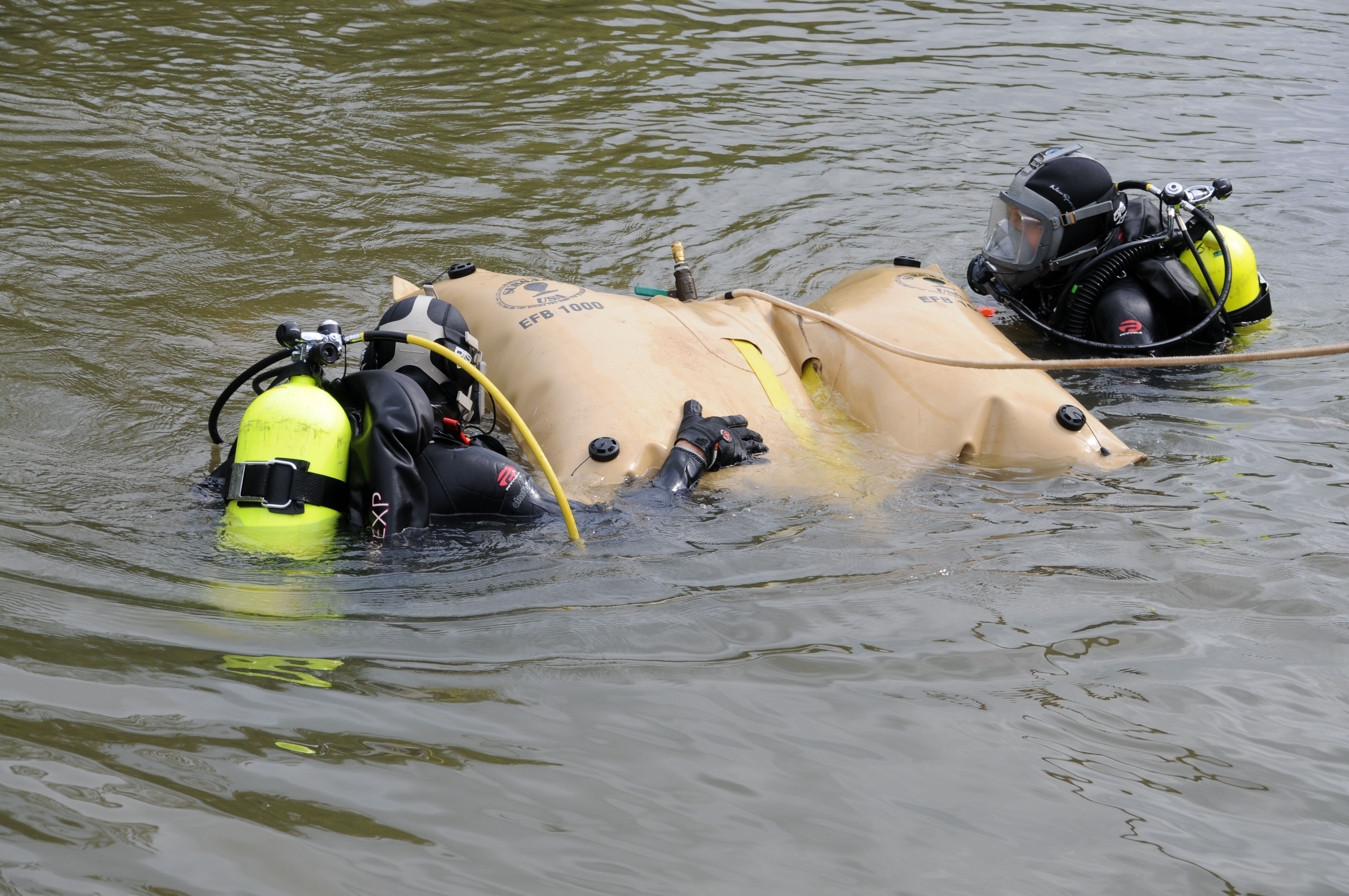
Underwater archeologists position a lift bag to readjust shoring during the excavation of the U.S. sloop-of-war Scorpion.

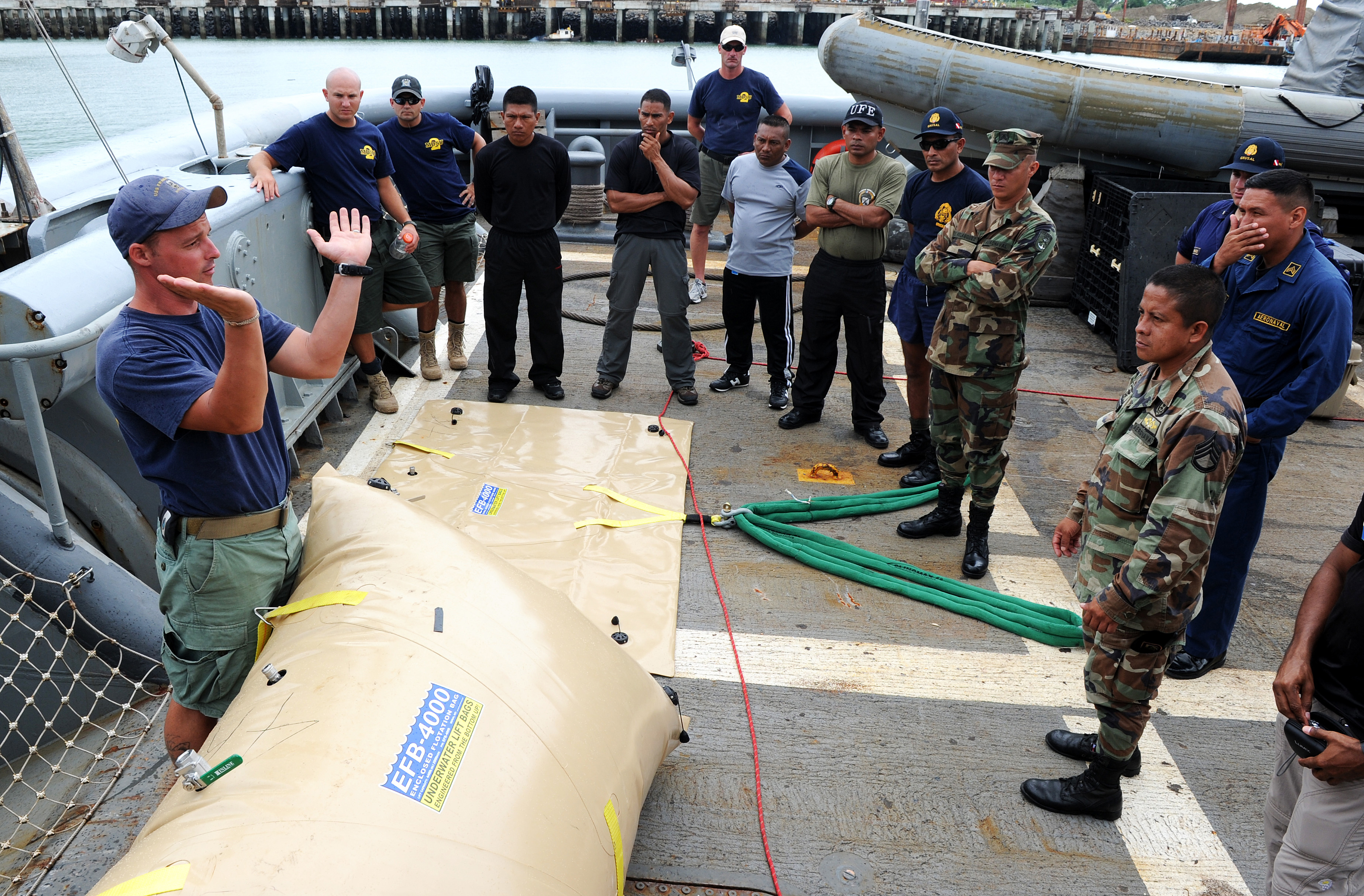
Training Navy divers in to operate lift bags.

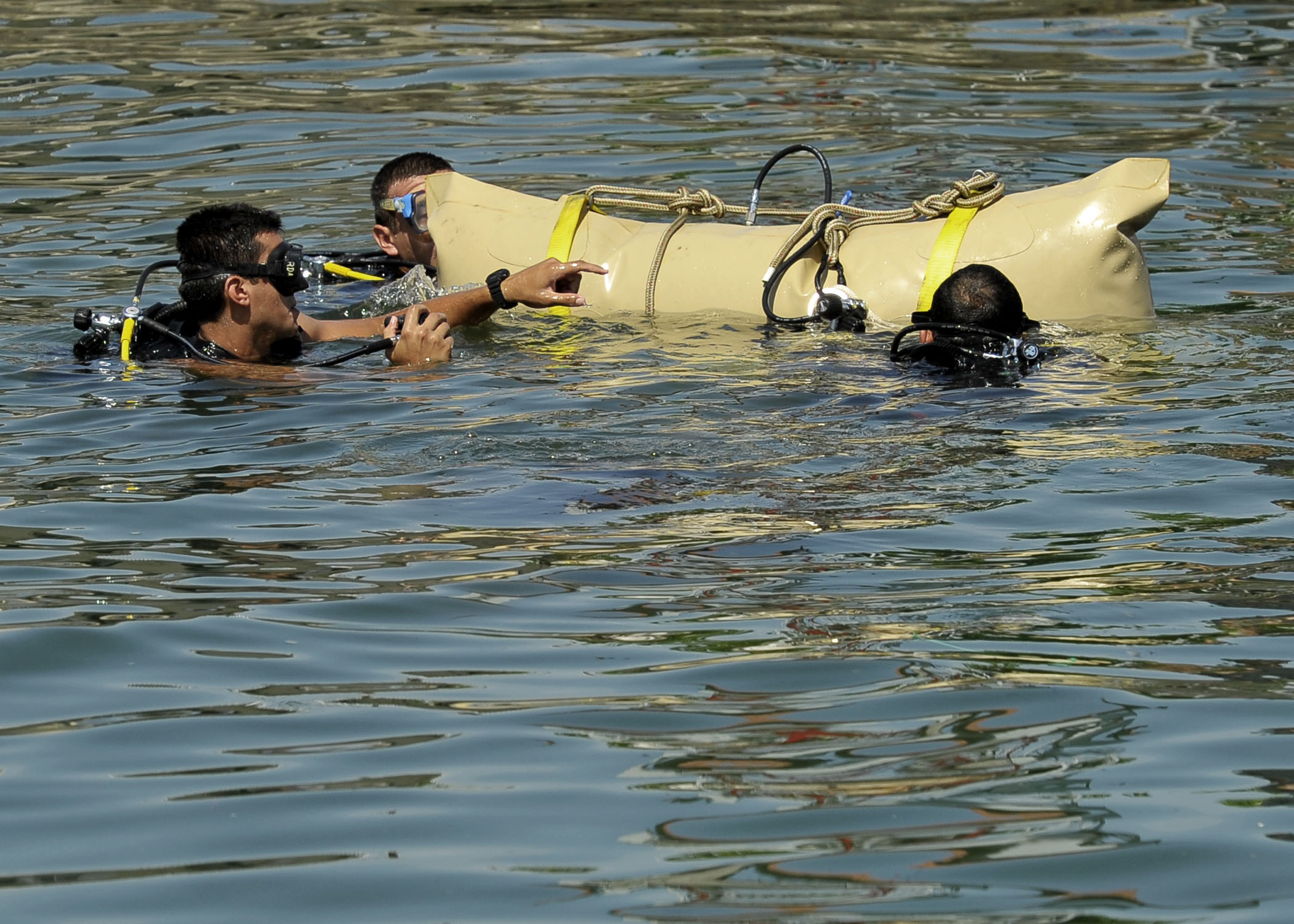
Navy training exercise using lift bags.
