= Oxygen compatibility =

Usability in high-oxygen environments

Oxygen compatibility is the issue of compatibility of materials for service in high concentrations of oxygen. It is a critical issue in space, aircraft, medical, underwater diving and industrial applications. Aspects include effects of increased oxygen concentration on the ignition and burning of materials and components exposed to these concentrations in service.

Understanding of fire hazards is necessary when designing, operating, and maintaining oxygen systems so that fires can be prevented. Ignition risks can be minimized by controlling heat sources and using materials that will not ignite or will not support burning in the applicable environment. Some materials are more susceptible to ignition in oxygen-rich environments, and compatibility should be assessed before a component is introduced into an oxygen system. Both partial pressure and concentration of oxygen affect the fire hazard.

The issues of cleaning and design are closely related to the compatibility of materials for safety and durability in oxygen service.

== Prevention of fire ==
Fires occur when oxygen, fuel, and heat energy combine in a self-sustaining chemical reaction. In an oxygen system the presence of oxygen is implied, and in a sufficiently high partial pressure of oxygen, most materials can be considered fuel. Potential ignition sources are present in almost all oxygen systems, but fire hazards can be mitigated by controlling the risk factors associated with the oxygen, fuel, or heat, which can limit the tendency for a chemical reaction to occur.

Materials are easier to ignite and burn more readily as oxygen pressure or concentration increase, so operating oxygen systems at the lowest practicable pressure and concentration may be enough to avoid ignition and burning.

Use of materials which are inherently more difficult to ignite or are resistant to sustained burning, or which release less energy when they burn, can, in some cases, eliminate the possibility of fire or minimize the damage caused by a fire.

Although heat sources may be inherent in the operation of an oxygen system, initiation of the chemical reaction between the system materials and oxygen can be limited by controlling the ability of those heat sources to cause ignition. Design features which can limit or dissipate the heat generated to keep temperatures below the ignition temperatures of the system materials will prevent ignition.

An oxygen system should also be protected from external heat sources.

== Assessment of oxygen compatibility ==
The process of assessment of oxygen compatibility would generally include the following stages:

- Identification of worst-case operating conditions.
- Evaluation of flammability of system materials. Geometry should be considered as most materials are more flammable when they have small cross-sections or are finely divided.
- Assessment of the presence and probability of ignition mechanisms. These may include:
  - Chemical reaction: An exothermic reaction between chemicals that could release sufficient heat to ignite the surrounding materials.
  - Electrical arc: Electric current arcing with enough energy to ignite the material receiving the arc.
  - Engine exhaust
  - Explosive charges
  - Flow friction: Heat generated by high velocity oxygen flow over a non-metal
    - Note:Flow friction is a hypothesis. Flow friction has not been experimentally verified and should be considered only in conjunction with validated ignition mechanisms.
  - Friction between relatively moving parts
  - Fragments from bursting vessels
  - Fresh metal exposure: Heat of oxidation released when unoxidized metal is exposed to an oxidizing atmosphere. Usually associated with fracture, impact or friction.
  - Galling and friction: Heat generated by rubbing components together.
  - Lightning and other electric arc discharge
  - Mechanical impact: Heat generated by impact on a material with sufficient energy to ignite it.
  - Open flames
  - Particle impact: Heat generated when small particles strike a material with sufficient velocity to ignite the particle or the material.
  - Personnel smoking
  - Rapid pressurization: Heat generated by single or multiple adiabatic compression events.
  - Resonance: Acoustic vibrations in resonant cavities that cause rapid temperature rise.
  - Static discharge: Discharge of accumulated static electrical charge with enough energy to ignite the material receiving the charge.
  - Thermal runaway: A process which produces heat faster than it can be dissipated.
  - Welding
- Estimation of the ignition risk and the consequences of ignition. The further development or dissipation of the fire.
- Analysis of the consequences of a fire

Compatibility analysis would also consider the history of use of the component or material in similar conditions, or of a similar component.

== Oxygen service ==
Oxygen service implies use in contact with high partial pressures of oxygen. Generally this is taken to mean a higher partial pressure than possible from compressed air, but also can occur at lower pressures when the concentration is high.

=== Oxygen cleaning ===
Oxygen cleaning is preparation for oxygen service by ensuring that the surfaces that may come into contact with high partial pressures of oxygen while in use are free of contaminants that increase the risk of ignition.

Oxygen cleaning is a necessary, but not always a sufficient condition for high partial pressure or high concentration oxygen service. The materials used must also be oxygen compatible at all expected service conditions. Aluminium and titanium components are specifically not suitable for oxygen service.

In the case of diving equipment, oxygen cleaning generally involves the stripping down of the equipment into individual components which are then thoroughly cleaned of hydrocarbon and other combustible contaminants using non-flammable, non-toxic cleaners. Once dry, the equipment is reassembled under clean conditions. Lubricants are replaced by specifically oxygen- compatible substitutes during reassembly.

The standard and requirements for oxygen cleaning of diving apparatus varies depending on the application and applicable legislation and codes of practice. For scuba equipment, the industry standard is that breathing apparatus which will be exposed to concentrations in excess of 40% oxygen by volume should be oxygen cleaned before being put into such service. Surface supplied equipment may be subject to more stringent requirements, as the diver may not be able to remove the equipment in an accident. Oxygen cleaning may be required for concentrations as low as 23% Other common specifications for oxygen cleaning include ASTM G93 and CGA G-4.1.

Cleaning agents used range from heavy-duty industrial solvents and detergents such as liquid freon, trichlorethylene and anhydrous trisodium phosphate, followed by rinsing in deionised water. These materials are now generally deprecated as being environmentally unsound and an unnecessary health hazard. Some strong all-purpose household detergents have been found to do the job adequately. They are diluted with water before use, and used hot for maximum efficacy. Ultrasonic agitation, shaking, pressure spraying and tumbling using glass or stainless steel beads or mild ceramic abrasives are effectively used to speed up the process where appropriate. Thorough rinsing and drying is necessary to ensure that the equipment is not contaminated by the cleaning agent. Rinsing should continue until the rinse water is clear and does not form a persistent foam when shaken. Drying using heated gas – usually hot air – is common and speeds up the process. Use of a low oxygen fraction drying gas can reduce flash-rusting of the interior of steel cylinders.

After cleaning and drying, and before reassembly, the cleaned surfaces are inspected and where appropriate, tested for the presence of contaminants. Inspection under ultraviolet illumination can show the presence of fluorescent contaminants, but is not guaranteed to show all contaminants.

=== Oxygen service design ===
Design for oxygen service includes several aspects:

- Choice of oxygen compatible materials for exposed components.
- Minimising exposed area of materials which are necessary for functional reasons but are less compatible, and avoiding high flow velocities in contact with these materials.
- Providing effective heat transfer to avoid raised temperatures of components.
- Minimising the possibility of adiabatic heating by sudden increases of pressure - for example by using valves which cannot be opened suddenly to full bore, or opening against a pressure regulator.
- Providing smooth surfaces in contact with flow where practicable, and minimising sudden changes in flow direction.
- Use of flame arrestors/Flashback arrestors/Oxygen firebreaks in flexible hose

=== Oxygen compatible materials ===
As a general rule, oxygen compatibility is associated with a high ignition temperature, and a low rate of reaction once ignited.

Organic materials generally have lower ignition temperatures than metals considered suitable for oxygen service. Therefore the use of organic materials in contact with oxygen should be avoided or minimised, particularly when the material is directly exposed to gas flow. When an organic material must be used for parts such as diaphragms, seals, packing or valve seats, the material with the highest ignition temperature for the required mechanical properties is usually chosen. Fluoroelastomers are preferred where large areas are in direct contact with oxygen flow. Other materials may be acceptable for static seals where the flow does not come into direct contact with the component.

Only tested and certified oxygen compatible lubricants and sealants should be used, and in as small quantities as is reasonably practicable for effective function. Projection of excess sealant or contamination by lubricant into flow regions should be avoided.

Commonly used engineering metals with a high resistance to ignition in oxygen include copper, copper alloys, and nickel-copper alloys, and these metals also do not normally propagate combustion, making them generally suitable for oxygen service. They are also available in free-cutting, castable or highly ductile alloys, and are reasonably strong, so are useful for a wide range of components for oxygen service.

Aluminium alloys have a relatively low ignition temperature, and release a large amount of heat during combustion and are not considered suitable for oxygen service where they will be directly exposed to flow, but are acceptable for storage cylinders where the flow rate and temperatures are low.

== Applications ==
- Aerospace – Term used to collectively refer to the atmosphere and outer space
- Medical – Diagnosis, treatment, and prevention of illness
- Manufacturing – Industrial activity producing goods for sale using labor and machines
- Underwater diving – Descending below the surface of the water to interact with the environment

== Research ==
Hazards analyses are performed on materials, components, and systems; and failure analyses determine the cause of fires. Results are used in design and operation of safe oxygen systems.
