= Index of underwater diving: T–Z =

Alphabetical listing of underwater diving related topics

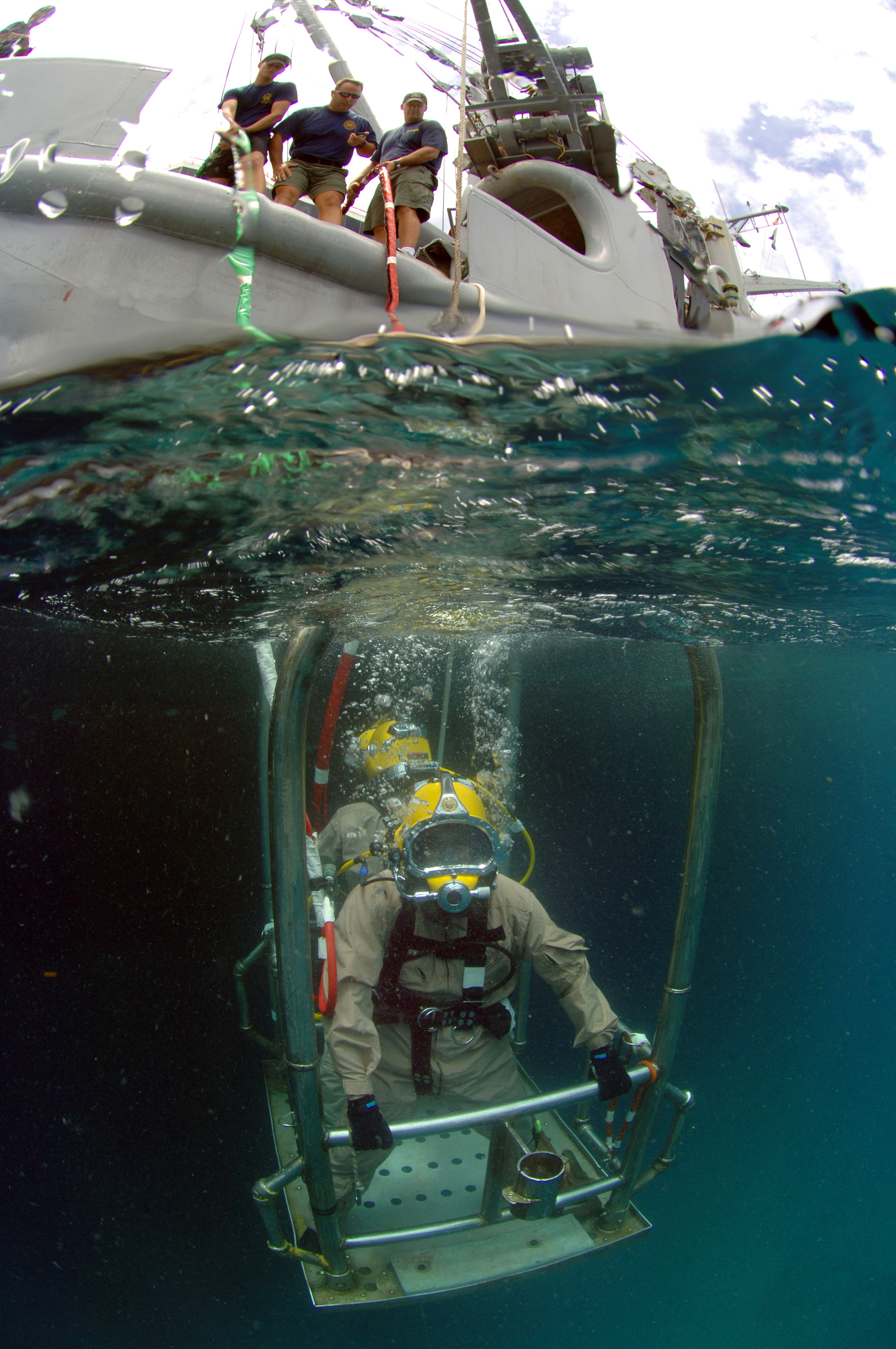
Surface-supplied divers riding a stage to the underwater workplace

The following index is provided as an overview of and topical guide to underwater diving: Links to articles and redirects to sections of articles which provide information on each topic are listed with a short description of the topic. When there is more than one article with information on a topic, the most relevant is usually listed, and it may be cross-linked to further information from the linked page or section.

Underwater diving can be described as all of the following:

- A human activity – intentional, purposive, conscious and subjectively meaningful sequence of actions. Underwater diving is practiced as part of an occupation, or for recreation, where the practitioner submerges below the surface of the water or other liquid for a period which may range between seconds to order of a day at a time, either exposed to the ambient pressure or isolated by a pressure resistant suit, to interact with the underwater environment for pleasure, competitive sport, or as a means to reach a work site for profit or in the pursuit of knowledge, and may use no equipment at all, or a wide range of equipment which may include breathing apparatus, environmental protective clothing, aids to vision, communication, propulsion, maneuverability, buoyancy control and safety equipment, and tools for the task at hand.

There are seven sub-indexes, listed here. The tables of content should link between them automatically:

- Index of underwater diving: A–C
- Index of underwater diving: D–E
- Index of underwater diving: F–K
- Index of underwater diving: L–N
- Index of underwater diving: O–R
- Index of underwater diving: S
- Index of underwater diving: T–Z

== T ==
Contents: Top	0–9	A	B	C	D	E	F	G	H	I	J	K	L	M	N	O	P	Q	R	S	T	U	V	W	X	Y	Z

Subsection: Top of section, Ta, Te, Th, Ti, To, Tr, Tu, Tw, Ty

- T1200 Trenching Unit – Remotely operated seabed trenching unit

=== Ta ===
- Table Marine National MN90, also known as MN90 decompression tables – French navy decompression tables
- Tactical diver – Military scuba diver
- Tactical Divers Group – Special operations force of the Argentine Navy
- Taifib – Indonesian Marine Corps amphibious reconnaissance unit
- Talus cave – Type of cave
- Tank weight – Ballast weight attached to a scuba cylinder
- Taravana – Decompression sickness caused by breath-hold diving
- Task loading – Relationship between operator capacity and the accumulated activities that must be done

=== Te ===
Subsection: Top of section, Ta, Te, Th, Ti, To, Tr, Tu, Tw, Ty

- Teaching method – Principles and methods used by teachers to enable student learning
- Team gas redundancy – System for sharing backup breathing gas within a dive team
- Team redundancy – System for sharing backup equipment and skill diversity
- Technical diver training – Processes to develop skills and knowledge to dive safely for technical diving
- Technical diving – Diving beyond the scope of recreational diving
- Technical diving instructor – Person certified to train recreational divers in technical disciplines
- Technical Diving International (TDI) – Technical diver training and certification agency
- Technical Extended Range (TXR) – Recreational scuba and freediving training and certification agency
- Technisub – Italian manufacturer of diving equipment
- Tektite habitat – Undersea laboratory and experimental habitat
- Temperate reef – Hard benthic substrate and ecosystems in cool to cold water in middle latitudes
- Temperature – Physical quantity of hot and cold
- Tension-leg platform – Type of offshore platform used in production of oil or gas
- Tesei, Teseo – Italian naval officer and pioneering military diver
- Test of pressure – Diagnostic technique to identify decompression sickness
- Testing and inspection of diving cylinders – Periodical inspection and testing to revalidate fitness for service
- Tethered ascent, also known as tethered buoyant emergency ascent, emergency tethered ascent, buoyant tethered ascent – Positive buoyancy emergency ascent using a reel upline (required skill for CMAS Self-Reliant Diver)
- Texas Finswimming Association – Official governing body for competitive and recreational finswimming in Texas

=== Th ===
Subsection: Top of section, Ta, Te, Th, Ti, To, Tr, Tu, Tw, Ty

- Thalmann algorithm – Mathematical model for diver decompression
- Thalmann, Edward D. – American hyperbaric medicine specialist (1945-2004)
- Tham Luang cave rescue – 2018 international rescue mission in Thailand
- The Darkness Beckons – History of UK cave diving by Martyn Farr
- The Last Dive – Non-fiction book by Bernie Chowdhury about a double wreck diving fatality
- Therapeutic decompression – Decompression from hyperbaric treatment
- Therapeutic decompression tables – Planned hyperbaric exposure profiles to treat decompression sickness
- Therapeutic recompression – Recompression to reduce symptoms of decompression illness
- Thermal balance of the underwater diver, also known as thermal balance of divers – Conditions in which the temperature of a diver can remain stable
- Thermal balance of the saturation diver – Maintaining body heat in the saturation diver
- Thermal comfort zone (TCZ) – Range of temperature and humidity comfortable for people
- Thermal neutral zone (TNZ), also known as thermoneutral zone – Minimal metabolic regulation to retain ambient core body temperature
- Thermal status of the underwater diver, also known as Thermal status of divers – Temperature distribution and heat balance of the diver
- Thermal undersuit – Insulating undergarments for use with a dry suit
- Thermocline – Distinct layer of temperature change in a body of water
- Thermodynamic model of decompression, also known as Thermodynamic decompression model – Early diving decompression model
- Theseus (AUV) – Large autonomous underwater vehicle for laying fibre-optic cable
- The Shaft (sinkhole) – Karst feature in South Australia
- Three bolt equipment – Standard diving dress using three bolts to clamp the helmet bonnet to the corselet
- Three Star Diver – Fully trained and experienced recreational diver
- Through-water communications – Wireless diver voice communications equipment
- Thunderbird cylinders – American manufacturer of seamless aluminum gas cylinders

=== Ti ===
Subsection: Top of section, Ta, Te, Th, Ti, To, Tr, Tu, Tw, Ty

- Tidal race – Fast-moving tidal flow
- Tide – Rise and fall of the sea level under astronomical gravitational influences
- Tillman, Albert – American educator and underwater diver
- Timeline of diving technology, also known as Timeline of underwater diving technology – Chronological list of notable events in the history of underwater diving equipment
- Time to surface (TTS) – Estimated ascent and decompression time from a given point on a dive profile
- Tissue (biology) – Group of similar cells performing a specific function
- Tissue gas loading – Amount of gas dissolved in a tissue
- Tissue slab decompression model – A diffusion limited series tissue decompression model
- Tissue slab diffusion model – Diffusion limited series tissue decompression model

=== To ===
Subsection: Top of section, Ta, Te, Th, Ti, To, Tr, Tu, Tw, Ty

- Toggle bag (concrete placement) – Method of concrete placement suitable for underwater use
- Torricellian chamber – Low pressure air space in a flooded cave chamber
- Total Nitrogen Time (TNT) – Equivalent pressure exposure estimate for a repetitive dive
- Touboulic, Pierre-Marie – French engineer, inventor and writer
- Tourism on the Great Barrier Reef – Service industry in Australia involving recreational diving
- Towboard – Underwater survey equipment used to tow a diver

=== Tr ===
Subsection: Top of section, Ta, Te, Th, Ti, To, Tr, Tu, Tw, Ty

- Training dive – Dive which is part of a training programme
- Training dive sites – Underwater environments selected as suitable for diving skills training
- Transfer chamber – Chamber in a saturation habitat where the bell locks on
- Transfer under pressure (TUP) – Moving between pressurised vessels without decompression
- Transfer under pressure decompression – Ascent in a closed bell with further decompression in a deck chamber
- Transfer under pressure diving – Surface oriented diving from a closed bell and a chamber for decompression
- Transportable recompression chamber – Small hyperbaric chamber in which a diver and an inside attendant can be transported under pressure
- Travel gas – Gas breathed during the descent part of a dive
- Traverse (cave diving) – A dive the exits from a different access to a cave
- Tremie – Equipment for underwater concrete placement
- Trial diving – Introductory scuba diving experience
- Tribonucleation – Mechanism for creation of microbubbles
- Trieste II – United States Navy's second bathyscaphe
- Triger, Jacques – French geologist who invented the pressurised caisson (1801–1867)
- Trim weights (diving) – Diving weights distributed primarily to improve trim
- Trimix blender – Person competent to blend trimix breathing gases for scuba diving
- Trimix (breathing gas) – Breathing gas consisting of oxygen, helium and nitrogen
- Trimix diving – Use of trimix gas blend for underwater diving
- Trimix Scuba Association (TSA) – Recreational technical scuba training and certification agency
- Trongle – Device used on submarines to help swimmers to locate a submerged submarine
- Tropical coral reef – Reefs built by warm-water coral species
- Try-dive – Supervised diving experience to try out diving or equipment

=== Tu ===
Subsection: Top of section, Ta, Te, Th, Ti, To, Tr, Tu, Tw, Ty

- Tubesuit – Active heat transfer undergarment
- TUP, also known as transfer under pressure – Moving between pressurised vessels without decompression
- Turbidity – Cloudiness of a fluid
- Turkish Underwater Sports Federation (TSSF), also known as Türkiye Sualtı Sporları Federasyonu – Turkish national governing body for underwater sport and lifesaving
- Turn pressure – Gas pressure at which the divers start the return from a dive

=== Tw ===
Subsection: Top of section, Ta, Te, Th, Ti, To, Tr, Tu, Tw, Ty

- Twin bladder buoyancy compensator – Scuba diving buoyancy compensator with redundant air bag
- Twin-hose regulator – Scuba regulator with two ambient pressure hoses to the mouthpiece

=== Ty ===
Subsection: Top of section, Ta, Te, Th, Ti, To, Tr, Tu, Tw, Ty

- Type 1 gas cylinder – Seamless metal gas cylinder
- Type 1 wet bell – Open diving bell without onboard gas panel
- Type 2 gas cylinder – Hoop wound composite reinforced gas cylinder
- Type 2 wet bell – Diving bell with onboard gas panel
- Type 3 gas cylinder – Seamless metal gas cylinder core fully wound with composite reinforcement
- Type 4 gas cylinder – Plastic cylinder liner fully wound with composite reinforcement
- Type 904 dive tender – Chinese class of naval diving support vessel

== U ==
Contents: Top	0–9	A	B	C	D	E	F	G	H	I	J	K	L	M	N	O	P	Q	R	S	T	U	V	W	X	Y	Z

Section contents: Top of section, Ul–Um, Un, Up–Ur, Us, Uw

=== Ul–Um ===
- Ultra deep air diving – Scuba diving on air to very dangerous depths
- Ultrasonic bubble detection, also known as Doppler bubble detection – Detection of vascular bubbles by ultrasonic sensors
- Ultrasonic bubble detection in decompression research – Non-invasive method for detecting vascular bubbles
- Umbilical cable – A cable and/or hose bundle which supplies required consumables to a remote user
- Umbilical management – Safe handling of the diver's umbilical
- Umbilical tending – Management of the supply end of the diver's umbilical

=== Un ===
Section contents: Top of section, Ul–Um, Un, Up–Ur, Us, Uw

- Uncontrolled buoyant ascent – Type of diving accident
- Uncontrolled decompression – Unplanned drop in the pressure of a sealed system
- Undersea and Hyperbaric Medical Society (UHMS) – US based hyperbaric research organization
- Undersea Medical Society – Original name of Undersea and Hyperbaric Medical Society
- The Undersea World of Jacques Cousteau – Documentary television series about underwater marine life
- Undersuit – Clothing worn under a protective suit
- Undertow (water waves) – Return flow below nearshore water waves
- Underwater – Aquatic or submarine environment
- Underwater acoustic communication – Wireless technique of sending and receiving messages through water
- Underwater acoustic positioning system – System for tracking and navigation of underwater vehicles or divers using acoustic signals
- Underwater acoustics – Study of the propagation of sound in water
- Underwater archaeology – Study of human activity via evidence found underwater
- Underwater archaeology techniques – Methodology used in underwater archaeology
- Underwater art – Works that are designed for or performed in an underwater environment
- Underwater Bike Race – Annual charity event in North Carolina
- Underwater blackout syndrome – Loss of consciousness caused by cerebral hypoxia towards the end of a breath-hold dive
- Underwater breathing apparatus – Equipment which provides breathing gas to an underwater diver
- Underwater camera housing – Water and pressure resistant container for camera
- Underwater citizen science – The organised collection of underwater data for scientific purposes by volunteers
- Underwater computer vision – Subfield of computer vision
- Underwater concrete placement – Positioning freshly mixed concrete at an underwater location where it is to set
- Underwater construction – Industrial construction in an underwater environment
- Underwater construction diving – Diving in support of underwater construction work
- Underwater Construction Teams – Navy construction battalion underwater construction units
- Underwater cutting and welding – Metalworking techniques used by underwater divers
- Underwater cycling – Stunt in which a bicycle is ridden under water
- Underwater Defence – Special operations unit of the Turkish Navy
- Underwater demolition – Deliberate destruction of underwater obstacles
- Underwater Demolition Command – Special warfare unit of the Greek and Cypriot navies
- Underwater Demolition Team – US Navy special operations group
- Underwater dive – Instance of underwater diving activity
- Underwater diver – Person who descends below the surface to interact with the environment
- Underwater diver training – Processes by which people develop the skills and knowledge to dive safely underwater
- Underwater divers – People who participate in underwater diving
- Underwater diving – Descending below the surface of the water to interact with the environment
- Underwater diving emergency – Situation that endangers the life or health of a diver
- Underwater diving environment – The underwater environment to which a diver may be exposed
- Underwater diving equipment – Equipment used to facilitate underwater diving
- Underwater diving hazards – Agents and situations that pose a threat to the underwater diver
- Underwater diving medicine – Diagnosis, treatment and prevention of disorders caused by underwater diving
- Underwater diving procedures – Standardised methods of doing things that are known to work effectively and acceptably safely
- Underwater diving safety – Safety and risk management in underwater diving
- Underwater diving terminology, also known as Underwater diving terms – Definitions of technical terms, jargon, diver slang and acronyms used in underwater diving
- Underwater domain awareness – Underwater component of maritime domain awareness
- Underwater environment – Aquatic or submarine environment
- Underwater exploration – Investigating or traveling around underwater for the purpose of discovery
- Underwater Explorers Club – British diving club, now defunct
- Underwater firearm – Firearms that can be effectively fired underwater
- Underwater football – Underwater team sport using snorkeling equipment and an American football
- Underwater glider – Type of autonomous underwater vehicle
- Underwater habitat – Human habitable underwater enclosure filled with breathable gas
- Underwater hockey – Underwater sport of pushing a puck into the opposing goal
- Underwater hockey in Australia
- Underwater hockey in Turkey
- Underwater Hockey Wales – Welsh underwater hockey association
- Underwater Hockey World Championships – International event for the sport of Underwater Hockey
- Underwater ice hockey – Freediving variant of ice hockey played upside-down under the ice
- Underwater inspection – Examination of underwater structure and equipment to assess condition
- Underwater mineral extraction – Mining minerals from underwater
- Underwater mining – Any mining activity done underwater
- Underwater music – Music composed to be performed or heard underwater
- Underwater navigator – Diver competent to navigate in open water by compass or pilotage
- Underwater Offence – Special operations Forces of the Turkish Navy
- Underwater orienteering – Underwater compass navigation and speed competition on scuba.
- Underwater Orienteering World Championships – International sporting competition
- Underwater painting – Technique of painting underwater
- Underwater photography – Genre of photography
- Underwater photography (sport) – Competitive underwater digital photography on scuba
- Underwater Photography World Championships – International event for the sport of underwater photography
- Underwater pilotage – Diver navigation using natural features
- Underwater Port Security System – Defense against hostile swimmer incursions
- Underwater rescue – Rescue of persons trapped underwater
- Underwater rifle – A man-portable, long-barreled firearm which can be fired effectively underwater
- Underwater rugby – Underwater team sport
- Underwater rugby in Australia – Team breathhold underwater sport
- Underwater rugby in Colombia – Regional sporting activity
- Underwater rugby in the United States – Watersport played on breathhold
- Underwater Rugby World Championships – International sporting competition
- Underwater sculpture – Sculpture made for underwater display
- Underwater search and recovery – Locating and recovering underwater objects
- Underwater search pattern – Techniques for finding underwater targets
- Underwater searches – Techniques for finding underwater targets
- Underwater search pattern – Techniques for finding underwater targets
- Underwater Society of America (USOA) – American national representative organization for underwater sport
- Underwater sports – Competitive underwater recreational activities
- Underwater sports at the 2013 Bolivarian Games – Finswimming, free-diving and spearfishing events at San Lorenzo island
- Underwater survey – Inspection or measurement in or of an underwater environment
- Underwater surveying – Inspection or measurement in or of an underwater environment
- Underwater target shooting – Underwater sport
- Underwater tender – Diver who attends to the umbilical of another diver while underwater
- Underwater tending point – Place where the diver's umbilical is restrained or controlled
- Underwater tourism – Recreational visits to underwater sites
- Underwater vehicle – Vehicle intended to operate underwater
- Underwater videographer – Diver trained in the use of video recorders underwater
- Underwater videography – Electronic underwater photography concerned with capturing moving images
- Underwater visibility – Distance at which an object can be seen through water
- Underwater vision – Ability to see objects underwater
- Underwater warfare – One of the four operational areas of naval warfare
- Underwater work – Work done underwater during diving operations
- Underwater wrestling (disambiguation) – Redirect to disambiguation page
- Under way – State of a vessel free to move through the water
- "Undeserved" decompression sickness – Symptoms not predicted by the algorithm in use
- UNESCO Code of Practice for Scientific Diving – Principles for the safe practice of diving for science
- United Diving Instructors (UDI) – Recreational diver training and certification agency
- United States Marine Corps Combatant Diver Course – Military diver training for the US Marines
- United States Marine Corps Force Reconnaissance – USMC deep reconnaissance unit
- United States Marine Corps Reconnaissance Battalions – Reconnaissance assets of Marine Air-Ground Task Force
- United States military divers – Underwater divers employed by the US armed forces
- United States Navy Experimental Diving Unit (NEDU) – US military research and development unit
- United States Navy SEALs – U.S. Navy's special operations force
- United States Navy SEAL selection and training – Special forces unit policy and procedures
- Universal Referral Program – System to complete recreational scuba training with another instructor
- Unmanned diving – Underwater diving by autonomous or remotely operated vehicles

=== Up–Ur ===
Section contents: Top of section, Ul–Um, Un, Up–Ur, Us, Uw

- Upstream scuba manifold – Manifold connecting cylinders upstream of the valve
- Upstream valve – Valve which is opened against the pressure differential
- Upward excursion – Saturation dive where ambient pressure is less than storage pressure
- Upwelling – Oceanographic phenomenon of wind-driven motion of ocean water
- URF (Swedish Navy) – Swedish submarine rescue vehicle

=== Us ===
Section contents: Top of section, Ul–Um, Un, Up–Ur, Us, Uw

- U.S. Divers – Manufacturer of scuba diving equipment
- User respiratory interface – Facepiece of a breathing apparatus
- US Navy 1937 air decompression tables – Decompression tables developred by O.D. Yarbrough for the US Navy
- US Navy 1943 100-foot Air Treatment Table – Recompression procedure for treading decompression sickness
- US Navy 1943 150-foot Air Treatment Table – Recompresiion procedure for treating decompression sickness
- US Navy 1943 200-foot Air Treatment Table – Recompression procedure for treating decompression sickness
- US Navy 1943 250-foot Air Treatment Table – Recompression procedure for treating decompression sickness
- US Navy 1943 300-foot Air Treatment Table – Recompression procedure for treating decompression sickness
- US Navy 1944 Long Air Recompression Treatment Table with Oxygen – Early treatment protocol for decompression sickness
- US Navy 1944 Short Air Recompression Treatment Table – Early hyperbaric treatment protocol for decompression sickness
- US Navy 1944 Short Oxygen Recompression Treatment Table – Recompression treatment protocol for decompression sickness
- US Navy decompression models and tables – Basis for the published decompression tables and algorithms
- U.S. Navy Diving Manual (USNDM), also known as United States Navy Diving Manual, or US Navy Diving Manual – Training and operations handbook
- U.S. Navy Experimental Diving Unit (USNEDU, NEDU) – The primary source of diving and hyperbaric operational guidance for the US Navy
- US Navy Air Treatment Table 1A – Recompression procedure for treating decompression sickness
- US Navy Air Treatment Table 2a – Recompression procedure for treating decompression sickness
- US Navy Air Treatment Table 3 – Recompression procedure for treating decompression sickness
- US Navy In-water Recompression Tables – Emergency field treatment for decompression sickness
- US Navy Recompression Treatment Table 1 – Recompression treatment protocol for decompression sickness
- US Navy Recompression Treatment Table 2 – Recompression procedure for treating decompression sickness
- US Navy Recompression Treatment Table 4 – Recompressio protocol for treating decompression sickness
- US Navy Recompression Treatment Table 5 – Recompression protocol for treating decompression sickness
- US Navy Recompression Treatment Table 5a – Recompression protocol for treating decompression sickness
- US Navy Recompression Treatment Table 6, also known as USN table 6 – Widely used treatment for decompression illness
- US Navy Recompression Treatment Table 6a – Recompression protocol for treating decompression sickness
- US Navy Treatment Table 7 – Recompression protocol for decompression sickness
- US Navy Treatment Table 8 – Recompression protocol for treating decompression sickness
- US Navy Treatment Table 9 – Recompression protocol for treating decompression sickness
- US Navy Treatment Table for decompression sickness occurring on saturation dives – Recompression protocol for treating decompression sickness

=== Uw ===
- Uwatec – Manufacturer of dive computers

== V ==
Contents: Top	0–9	A	B	C	D	E	F	G	H	I	J	K	L	M	N	O	P	Q	R	S	T	U	V	W	X	Y	Z

Subsection: Top of section, Va, Ve, Vi, Vo

- "V" saturation profile – Depth profile type for saturation storage

=== Va ===
- Validation of decompression models – Experimental confirmation of safety of decompression models
- Valsalva device – Pad in headgear which blocks nose to assist ear clearing
- Valsalva maneuver – Technique for equalising pressure in the middle ears
- Valve cage – Structure fitted to diving cylinder to protect valve
- Valve cracking pressure – Pressure difference needed to open a valve
- Valve knob – Hand grip for turning the valve spindle
- Valve snorkel – Tube at the valve base to keep detritus out of the inlet
- Variable-buoyancy pressure vessel – Type of rigid buoyancy control device
- Variable-buoyancy propulsion – Use of a buoyancy engine to provide propulsion
- Variable density buoyancy compensator – Equipment for controlling the buoyancy of a diver or submersible
- Variable density buoyancy control – Technique for controlling the buoyancy of a diver or submersible
- Variable gradient model – Decompression model using gradient factors that vary non-linearly with depth
- Variable volume buoyancy compensator – Equipment for controlling the buoyancy of a diver
- Variable weight apnea – Deep freediving using a weighted sled for descent, pulling along the depth rope for ascent
- Variable weight apnea without fins – Competitive freediving discipline
- Varying Permeability Model – Decompression model and algorithm based on bubble physics
- Vasa (ship) – 17th-century Swedish warship

=== Ve ===
Subsection: Top of section, Va, Ve, Vi, Vo

- Velocity distribution in a water wave – Motion pattern in the water of a gravity wave
- Venting the rebreather loop, also known as venting the loop – Intentionally releasing gas from the breathing circuit}
- Venture One diving accident – Saturation diving fatality in the North Sea in 1977
- Vertical Blue – Freediving competition in the Bahamas at Dean's Blue Hole
- Vertigo – Dizziness with sensation of moving or surrounding objects moving

=== Vi ===
Subsection: Top of section, Va, Ve, Vi, Vo

- VideoRay UROVs – Series of inspection class remotely operated underwater vehicles
- Viewport (diving) – Transparent part of a helmet, submersible, or diving chamber
- Viking (dry suits) – Swedish brand of diving dry suits
- Vintage scuba – Early model scuba equipment and the ongoing activity of diving with it
- Vítkovice Cylinders a.s. – Czech manufacturer of seamless pressure cylinders for gas

=== Vo ===
Subsection: Top of section, Va, Ve, Vi, Vo

- Volumetric gas fraction – Dimensionless quantity
- Voyage to the Edge of the World – 1976 French nature documentary
- VVAL 18 – Mathematical model for diver decompression

== W ==
Contents: Top	0–9	A	B	C	D	E	F	G	H	I	J	K	L	M	N	O	P	Q	R	S	T	U	V	W	X	Y	Z

Section contents: Top of section, Wa, We, Wi, Wo, Wr

- "W" saturation profile – Type of saturation storage depth sequence

=== Wa ===
- Waage Drill II diving accident – Fatal saturation diving accident in the North Sea in 1975
- Wall diving – Underwater diving alongside a near vertical face
- Walter Kidde and Co – US manufacturer of seamless aluminum gas cylinders
- WASP atmospheric diving system – Type of armoured diving suit without leg articulation
- Water clarity – How deeply visible light penetrates through water
- Water polo cap – Headgear used in water polo and a number of underwater sports
- Waterproof digital camera – Digital still camera with inherently waterproof casing
- Water safety – Human safety in the vicinity of bodies of water
- Water separator – Device to remove condensed water from compressed air
- Water surface searches – Procedures to find objects or persons lost at the surface of a body of water
- Watertight zipper – Zipper closure which prevents water leakage when closed
- Waves and shallow water – Effect of shallow water on a surface gravity wave
- Wave shoaling – Effect by which surface waves entering shallower water change in wave height

=== We ===
Section contents: Top of section, Wa, We, Wi, Wo, Wr

- Weight – Force on a mass due to gravity
- Weight belt – Ballast carried to counteract buoyancy
- Weighted boots (diving) – Shoes with heavy metal soles used as part of a diver's weights
- Weighted shoes (diving) – Shoes with heavy metal soles used as part of a diver's weights
- Weight harness – Webbing system to support diver ballast weights
- Weight pocket – Container on diving equipment to hold ballast
- Welded pressure vessel – Container made from more than one metal part welded together
- Welfreighter – British midget submarine of the Second World War
- Wells, John Morgan – Physiologist, aquanaut and researcher (1940–2017)
- Welman submarine – Second World War one-man British midget submarine
- Welsh Association of Sub Aqua Clubs – Former governing body of sub-aqua in Wales
- Wet bell – Platform for transporting divers vertically through the water
- Wet bell emergency procedures – Standard procedures for use in common surface-supplied wet bell diving emergencies
- Wet Nellie – 1976 car-shaped submarine from the James Bond film The Spy Who Loved Me
- Wet pot – Wet or water filled hyperbaric chamber
- Wet sub – Ambient pressure diver propulsion vehicle
- Wetsuit – Garment worn to provide thermal protection while wet
- Wetsuit boots – Foam neoprene footwear for watersports
- Wetsuit buoyancy – Upwards forece generated by the volume of an immersed wetsuit
- Wetsuit buoyancy loss – Temporary reduction of volume due to compression at depth

=== Wi ===
Section contents: Top of section, Wa, We, Wi, Wo, Wr

- Wienke, Bruce – Bubble model decompression researcher
- Wildrake diving accident – Fatal offshore diving accident in Scotland, 1979
- Willful ignorance – Strategy of avoiding accountably or liability
- Willful violation – Deliberate or negligent violation of workplace rules and policies
- Wind generated current – Flow in a body of water generated by wind friction on its surface
- Wind wave – Surface waves generated by wind on open water
- Wireless diver communications – Technology for voice transmission through water
- Wireless pressure transmitter – Cylinder pressure sensor for input to dive computer

=== Wo ===
Section contents: Top of section, Wa, We, Wi, Wo, Wr

- Women Divers Hall of Fame – International honor society
- Woodville Karst Plain Project (WKPP) – Project and organization to map the underwater cave systems of the Woodville Karst Plain
- Work of breathing (WOB) – Energy expended to inhale and exhale a breathing gas
- Working diver – The person who is intended to do the underwater work during a professional dive
- Workplace health surveillance – Ongoing surveillance of workers' health
- World Recreational Scuba Training Council (WRSTC) – Scuba diving standards body
- World Without Sun – 1964 film by Jacques Cousteau
- Worthington Cylinder Corporation – US manufacturer of seamless steel gas cylinders
- Worthington Cylinders GesmbH – Austrian manufacturer of seamless steel pressure cylinders

=== Wr ===
- Wreck Alley – Area off California with several wrecks sunk as artificial reefs
- Wreck diving – Recreational diving on wrecks
- Wreck line – Guide line used in wreck diving
- Wreck penetration diving – Diving inside a sunken shipwreck

== Y ==
Contents: Top	0–9	A	B	C	D	E	F	G	H	I	J	K	L	M	N	O	P	Q	R	S	T	U	V	W	X	Y	Z

- YMCA SCUBA Program – Defunct recreational diver training and certification agency
- Yoke connector – Clamp to connect scuba regulator to cylinder valve
- Yoke (diving helmet) – Component to prevent accidental removal of a diving helmet

== Α–Ω ==
Contents: Top	0–9	A	B	C	D	E	F	G	H	I	J	K	L	M	N	O	P	Q	R	S	T	U	V	W	X	Y	Z

- Δ-P (hazard) – Underwater hazard due to strong localised pressure differential

== See also ==
- Outline of underwater diving – List of articles related to underwater diving grouped by topical relevance
- Glossary of underwater diving terminology
