= US Navy decompression models and tables =

Basis for the published decompression tables and algorithms

The US Navy has used several decompression models from which their published decompression tables and authorized diving computer algorithms have been derived. The original C&R tables used a classic multiple independent parallel compartment model based on the work of John Scott Haldane in England in the early 20th century, using a critical ratio exponential ingassing and outgassing model. Later they were modified by O.D. Yarbrough and published in 1937. A version developed by M. Des Granges was published in 1956. Further developments by M.W. Goodman and Robert D. Workman using a critical supersaturation approach to incorporate M-values, and expressed as an algorithm suitable for programming were published in 1965, and later again a significantly different model, the VVAL 18 exponential/linear model was developed by Edward D. Thalmann, using an exponential ingassing model and a combined exponential and linear outgassing model, which was further developed by Gerth and Doolette and published in Revision 6 of the US Navy Diving Manual as the 2008 tables.

Besides the air and heliox tables for open circuit bounce dives, the US Navy has published a variety of hyperbaric treatment schedules, decompression tables for open and closed circuit heliox and nitrox, tables incorporating surface decompression on oxygen, a system for modifying tables for use at high altitudes (Cross corrections), and saturation tables for various breathing gas mixtures. Many of these tables have been tested on human subjects, frequently with a result of symptomatic decompression sickness, and for this reason their test results are considered some of the most reliable available.

US Navy tables have generally been freely available for use by the general public, and have often been modified to further reduce risk, as commercial and recreational divers do not always fit the physical requirements for military divers, may not have a recompression chamber on site to manage decompression sickness on those occasions when it does occur, and may prefer to operate at a lower risk than military personnel. Several recreational diving tables were originally based on US Navy diving tables.

== C&R tables ==
In 1912, Chief Gunner George D. Stillson of the United States Navy created a program to test and refine Haldane's tables. This program ultimately led to the first publication of the United States Navy Diving Manual and the establishment of a Navy Diving School in Newport, Rhode Island. Diver training programs were later cut at the end of World War I.

The first decompression tables produced for the U.S. Navy were developed by the Bureau of Construction and Repair and published in 1915, and were consequently known as the C&R tables. They were derived from a Haldanean model, with oxygen decompression, to depths up to 300 ft on air, and were successfully used to depths of slightly over 300 ft

== 1937 tables ==
- 1916 - UN Navy established its Deep Sea Diving School in Newport, Rhode Island.
- 1924 - US Navy published first US Navy Diving Manual.
- 1927 – Naval School, Diving and Salvage was re-established at the Washington Navy Yard. At that time the United States moved their Navy Experimental Diving Unit (NEDU) to the same naval yard. In the following years, the Experimental Diving Unit developed the US Navy Air Decompression Tables which became the accepted world standard for diving with compressed air.
- 1930's – J.A. Hawkins, C.W. Schilling and R.A. Hansen conducted extensive experimental dives to determine allowable supersaturation ratios for different tissue compartments for Haldanean model.
- 1935 – Albert R. Behnke et al. experimented with oxygen for recompression therapy.
- 1937 – US Navy 1937 tables developed by O.D. Yarbrough were published.

== 1939 Heliox tables ==
In 1939, after the recovery of USS Squalus, tables were published for surface supplied Heliox diving.

== 1956 tables ==
- 1956 – US Navy Decompression Tables developed by M. Des Granges (1956) were published.
- 1971 – In the US, the Williams-Steiger Occupational Safety and Health Act of 1970 triggered investigation of the safety of US Navy tables in reaction to an attempt to legislate their use for commercial diving.
- 1976 – Edward Beckman published findings of a comparison of US Navy air tables with RNPL, Buhlmann and other tables and indicating that the US Navy tables for diving below 100 fsw which were reputed to produce unacceptable rates of decompression sickness for civilian applications, were significantly less conservative than the other models in the comparison.

== Recompression tables ==
Although recompression and slow decompression were the accepted treatment, there was not yet a standard for either the recompression pressure or the rate of decompression. This changed when the first standard table for recompression treatment with air was published in the US Navy Diving Manual in 1924. These tables were not entirely successful - there was a 50% relapse rate, and the treatment, though fairly effective for mild cases, was less effective in serious cases.

- 1943 100-foot Air Treatment Table: Used for treatment of decompression sickness where relief is obtained at or less than 66 fsw.
- 1943 150-foot Air Treatment Table: Used for treatment of decompression sickness where relief is obtained at or less than 116 fsw.
- 1943 200-foot Air Treatment Table: Used for treatment of decompression sickness where relief is obtained at or less than 166 fsw.
- 1943 250-foot Air Treatment Table: Used for treatment of decompression sickness where relief is obtained at or less than 216 fsw.
- 1943 300-foot Air Treatment Table: Used for treatment of decompression sickness where relief is obtained at or less than 266 fsw.
- 1944 Long Air Recompression Treatment Table: Used for treatment of moderate to severe decompression sickness when oxygen is not available or the patient cannot tolerate the elevated oxygen partial pressure.
- 1944 Long Air Recompression Treatment Table with Oxygen: Used for treatment of moderate to severe decompression sickness when oxygen is available.
- 1944 Short Air Recompression Treatment Table: Used for treatment of mild decompression sickness when oxygen is not available or the patient cannot tolerate the elevated oxygen partial pressure.
- 1944 Short Oxygen Recompression Treatment Table: Used for treatment of mild decompression sickness.
- Treatment Table 1: Used for treatment of pain only decompression sickness.
- Air Treatment Table 1a: Used for treatment of pain only decompression sickness.
- Treatment Table 2: Used for treatment of pain-only decompression sickness.
- Air Treatment Table 2a: Used for treatment of pain only decompression sickness when oxygen cannot be used.
- Air Treatment Table 3: Used as a last resort when oxygen is not available.
- Treatment Table 4: Used for treatment of serious symptoms when oxygen can be used and symptoms are not relieved within 30 minutes at 165 fsw (50 msw).
- Treatment Table 5: Use for treatment of pain-only decompression sickness when oxygen can be used and symptoms are relieved within 10 minutes at 60 ft.
- Treatment Table 5a: Used for treatment of gas embolism when oxygen can be used and symptoms are relieved within 15 minutes at 165 fsw (50 msw).
- Treatment Table 6: Used for treatment of pain-only decompression sickness when oxygen can be used and symptoms are not relieved within 10 minutes at 60 fsw (18 msw).
- Treatment Table 6a: Used for treatment of gas embolism when oxygen can be used and symptoms moderate to a major extent within 30 minutes at 165 ft.
- Treatment Table 7: Used for treatment of non-responding severe gas embolism or life-threatening decompression sickness. It is used when loss of life may result from decompression from 60 fsw. It is not used to treat residual symptoms that do not improve at 60 fsw, or to treat residual pain.
- Treatment Table 8: Used mainly for treating deep uncontrolled ascents when more than 60 minutes of decompression have been omitted.
- Treatment Table 9: Used for hyperbaric oxygen treatment as prescribed by Diving Medical Officer for residual symptoms after treatment for AGE/DCS. Also used for cases of carbon monoxide or cyanide poisoning, and smoke inhalation.
- Treatment Table for decompression sickness occurring on saturation dives: One version used for treatment of decompression sickness manifested as musculoskeletal pains only, during decompression from saturation. Other version used for treatment of serious decompression sickness resulting from upward excursion.

In 1965, M.W. Goodman and Robert D. Workman introduced recompression tables using oxygen to accelerate elimination of inert gas.

== Saturation tables ==
Once all the tissue compartments have reached saturation for a given pressure and breathing mixture, continued exposure will not increase the gas loading of the tissues. From this point onward the required decompression remains the same. If divers work and live at pressure for a long period, and are decompressed only at the end of the period, the risks associated with decompression are limited to this single exposure. This principle has led to the practice of saturation diving, and as there is only one decompression, and it is done in the relative safety and comfort of a saturation habitat, the decompression is done on a very conservative profile, minimising the risk of bubble formation, growth and the consequent injury to tissues. A consequence of these procedures is that saturation divers are more likely to suffer decompression sickness symptoms in the slowest tissues, whereas bounce divers are more likely to develop bubbles in faster tissues.

Decompression from a saturation dive is a slow process. The rate of decompression typically ranges between 3 and 6 fsw (0.9 and 1.8 msw) per hour. The US Navy Heliox saturation decompression rates require a partial pressure of oxygen to be maintained at between 0.44 and 0.48 atm when possible, but not to exceed 23% by volume, to restrict the risk of fire.

US Navy heliox saturation decompression table
Depth	Ascent rate
1600 to 200 fsw (488 to 61 msw)	6 fsw (1.83 msw) per hour
200 to 100 fsw (61 to 30 msw)	5 fsw (1.52 msw) per hour
100 to 50 fsw (30 to 15 msw)	4 fsw (1.22 msw) per hour
50 to 0 fsw (15 to 0 msw)	3 fsw (0.91 msw) per hour

For practicality the decompression is done in increments of 1 fsw at a rate not exceeding 1 fsw per minute, followed by a stop, with the average complying with the table ascent rate. Decompression is done for 16 hours in 24, with the remaining 8 hours split into two rest periods. A further adaptation generally made to the schedule is to stop at 4 fsw for the time that it would theoretically take to complete the decompression at the specified rate, i.e. 80 minutes, and then complete the decompression to surface at 1 fsw per minute. This is done to avoid the possibility of losing the door seal at a low pressure differential and losing the last hour or so of slow decompression.

== U.S. Navy E-L algorithm and the 2008 tables ==
In 1983, Edward D. Thalmann published the E-L model for constant P_{O_{2}} nitrox and heliox closed circuit rebreathers, in 1984 published U.S. Navy Exponential-Linear algorithm and tables for constant P_{O_{2}} Nitrox closed circuit rebreather (CCR) applications, and in 1985 Thalmann extended use of the E-L model for constant P_{O_{2}} heliox closed circuit rebreathers.

In 2007, Wayne Gerth and David J. Doolette published VVal 18 and VVal 18M parameter sets for tables and programs based on the Thalmann E-L algorithm, and produced an internally compatible set of decompression tables for open circuit and CCR on air and nitrox, including in water air/oxygen decompression and surface decompression on oxygen.

In 2008 the US Navy Diving Manual Revision 6 was published, which includes a version of the 2007 tables by Gerth & Doolette. The air decompression tables in Revision 6 of the U.S. Navy Diving Manual combine decompression tables for air diving with schedules for decompression on air, air and in-water oxygen, and surface decompression using oxygen. The tables were computed using version VVal-18M of the Thalmann exponential-linear decompression model.

=== VVAL 18 algorithm ===
The Thalmann Algorithm (VVAL 18) is a deterministic decompression model originally designed in 1980 to produce a decompression schedule for divers using the US Navy Mk15 rebreather. It was developed by Capt. Edward D. Thalmann, MD, USN, who did research into decompression theory at the Naval Medical Research Institute, Navy Experimental Diving Unit, State University of New York at Buffalo, and Duke University. The algorithm forms the basis for the US Navy mixed gas and standard air dive tables published in US Navy Diving Manual Revisions 6 and 7. This decompression model is also referred to as the Linear–Exponential model or the Exponential–Linear model.

== US Navy Diving Manual Revision 7 ==
As of January 2023 the currently approved decompression tables are listed in Revision 7 of the US Navy Diving Manual.

== US Navy dive computers ==
In 1984 the US Navy diving computer (UDC) which was based on a 9 tissue model by Edward D. Thalmann of the Naval Experimental Diving Unit (NEDU), Panama City. Divetronic AG completed the UDC development – as it had been started by the chief engineer Kirk Jennings of the Naval Ocean System Center, Hawaii, and Thalmann of the NEDU – by adapting the Deco Brain for US Navy warfare use and for their 9-tissue MK-15 mixed gas model under a research and development contract with the US Navy.

In 2001, the US Navy approved the use of Cochran NAVY decompression computer with the VVAL 18 Thalmann algorithm for Special Warfare operations.

As of 2023, Shearwater Research has supplied dive computers to the US Navy with an exponential/linear algorithm based on the Thalman algorithm since Cochran Undersea Technology closed down after the death of the owner. This algorithm is not as of 2024 available to the general public on Shearwater computers, although the algorithm is freely available and known to be lower risk than the Buhlmann algorithm for mixed gas and constant set-point CCR diving at deeper depths, which is the primary market for Shearwater products.

== Validation ==
It is important that any theory be validated by carefully controlled testing procedures. As testing procedures and equipment become more sophisticated, researchers learn more about the effects of decompression on the body. Initial research focused on producing dives that were free of recognizable symptoms of decompression sickness (DCS). With the later use of Doppler ultrasound testing, it was realized that bubbles were forming within the body even on dives where no DCI signs or symptoms were encountered. This phenomenon has become known as "silent bubbles". The presence of venous gas emboli is considered a low specificity predictor of decompression sickness, but their absence is recognised to be a sensitive indicator of low risk decompression, therefore the quantitative detection of VGE is thought to be useful as an indicator of decompression stress when comparing decompression strategies, or assessing the efficiency of procedures.

The US Navy 1956 tables were based on limits determined by external DCS signs and symptoms. Later researchers were able to improve on this work by adjusting the limitations based on Doppler testing. However the US Navy CCR tables based on the Thalmann algorithm also used only recognisable DCS symptoms as the test criteria. Since the testing procedures are lengthy and costly, and there are ethical limitations on experimental work on human subjects with injury as an endpoint, it is common practice for researchers to make initial validations of new models based on experimental results from earlier trials. This has some implications when comparing models.

== Cross altitude corrections ==
At altitude, atmospheric pressure is lower than at sea level, so surfacing at the end of an altitude dive leads to a greater relative reduction in pressure and an increased risk of decompression sickness compared to the same dive profile at sea level. The dives are also typically carried out in freshwater at altitude so it has a lower density than seawater used for calculation of decompression tables. The amount of time the diver has spent acclimatising at altitude is also of concern as divers with gas loadings near those of sea level may also be at an increased risk. The US Navy recommends waiting 12 hours following arrival at altitude before performing the first dive. The tissue supersaturation following an ascent to altitude can also be accounted for by considering it to be residual nitrogen and allocating a residual nitrogen group when using tables with this facility.

The most common of the modifications to decompression tables at altitude are the "Cross Corrections" which use a ratio of atmospheric pressure and sea level to that of the altitude to provide a conservative equivalent sea level depth. The procedure is described in detail in the U.S. Navy Diving Manual

== See also ==
- History of decompression research and development
