= UHW =

UHW may refer to:

- Underwater Hockey Wales, governing body of octopush in Wales
- University Hospital of Wales, a public hospital in Cardiff, Wales
- University Hospital Waterford, a public hospital in Waterford, Ireland
