= Wind generated current =

Flow in a body of water generated by wind friction on its surface

A Wind generated current is a flow in a body of water that is generated by wind friction on its surface. Wind can generate surface currents on water bodies of any size. The depth and strength of the current depend on the wind strength and duration, and on friction and viscosity losses, but are limited to about 400 m depth by the mechanism, and to lesser depths where the water is shallower. The direction of flow is influenced by the Coriolis effect, and is offset to the right of the wind direction in the Northern Hemisphere, and to the left in the Southern Hemisphere. A wind current can induce secondary water flow in the form of upwelling and downwelling, geostrophic flow, and western boundary currents.

== Mechanism ==
Friction between wind and the upper surface of a body of water will drag the water surface along with the wind The surface layer will exert viscous drag on the water just below, which will transfer some of the momentum. This process continues downward, with a continuous reduction in speed of flow with increasing depth as the energy is dissipated. The inertial effect of planetary rotation causes an offset of flow direction with increasing depth to the right in the northern hemisphere and to the left in the southern hemisphere. The mechanism of deflection is called the Coriolis effect, and the variation of flow velocity with depth is called an Ekman spiral. The effect varies with latitude, being very weak at the equator and increasing in strength with latitude. The resultant flow of water caused by this mechanism is known as Ekman transport.

A steady wind blowing across a long fetch in deep water for long enough to establish a steady state flow causes the surface water to move at 45° to the wind direction. The variation in flow direction with depth has the water moving perpendicular to the wind direction by about 100 to 150 m depth, and flow speed drops to about 4% of surface flow speed by the depth of about 330 to 400 m where the flow direction is opposite to wind direction, below which the effect of wind on the current is considered negligible. The net flow of water over the effective thickness of the current in these conditions is perpendicular to wind direction. Consistent prevailing winds set up persistent circulating surface currents in both hemispheres, and where the current is bounded by continental land masses, the resulting gyres are restricted in longitudinal extent. Seasonal and local winds cause smaller scale and generally transient currents, which dissipate after the driving winds die down.

Real conditions often differ, as wind strength and direction vary, and the depth may not be sufficient for the full spiral to develop, so that the angle between wind direction and surface-water movement can be as small as 15°. In deeper water, the angle increases and approaches 45°. A stable pycnocline can inhibit transfer of kinetic energy to deeper waters, providing a depth limit for surface currents.

The net inward shallow water flow in a gyre causes the surface level to gradually slope upwards towards the centre. This induces a horizontal pressure gradient which leads to a balancing geostrophic flow.

=== Boundary currents ===
The world's largest ocean gyres

Boundary currents are ocean currents with dynamics determined by the presence of a coastline, and fall into two distinct categories:

Eastern boundary currents are relatively shallow, broad and slow-flowing currents on the eastern side of oceanic basins along the western coasts of continents. Subtropical eastern boundary currents flow equatorward, transporting cold water from higher latitudes to lower latitudes; examples include the Benguela Current, the Canary Current, the Humboldt Current, and the California Current. Coastal upwelling caused by offshore flow due to Ekman transport where the prevailing wind parallels the shoreline brings nutrient-rich water into eastern boundary current regions, making them highly productive areas.

Western boundary currents are warm, deep, narrow, and fast flowing currents that form on the west side of ocean basins due to western intensification. They carry warm water from the tropics poleward. Examples include the Gulf Stream, the Agulhas Current, and the Kuroshio.

Western intensification is an effect on the western arm of an oceanic current, particularly a large gyre in an ocean basin. The trade winds blow westward in the tropics. The westerlies blow eastward at mid-latitudes. This applies a stress to the ocean surface with a curl in north and south hemispheres, causing Sverdrup transport toward the tropics. Conservation of mass and potential vorticity cause that transport to be balanced by a narrow, intense poleward current, which flows along the western coast, allowing the vorticity introduced by coastal friction to balance the vorticity input of the wind. The reverse effect applies to the polar gyres – the sign of the wind stress curl and the direction of the resulting currents are reversed. The principal west side currents (such as the Gulf Stream of the North Atlantic Ocean) are stronger than those opposite (such as the California Current of the North Pacific Ocean).

=== Wind driven upwelling ===
When the net Ekman transport along a coastline is offshore, a compensatory inflow is possible from below, which brings up bottom water, which tends to be nutrient rich as it comes from the poorly lit regions where photosynthesis is insignificant.

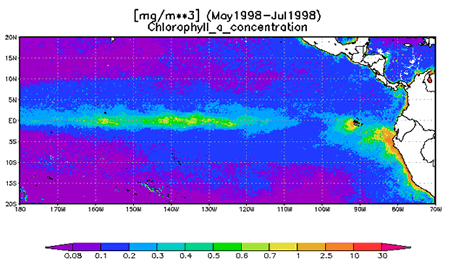
Effects of equatorial upwelling on surface chlorophyll concentrations in the Pacific Ocean

Upwelling at the equator is associated with the Intertropical Convergence Zone (ITCZ) which moves seasonally, and consequently, is often located just north or south of the equator. Easterly trade winds blow from the Northeast and Southeast and converge along the equator blowing West to form the ITCZ. Although there are no Coriolis forces present along the equator, upwelling still occurs just north and south of the equator. This results in a divergence, with denser, nutrient-rich water being upwelled from below.

=== Oceanic downwelling ===
Downwelling in the ocean

Downwelling occurs at anti-cyclonic places of the ocean where warm core rings cause surface convergence and push the surface water downwards, or wind drives the sea towards a coastline. Regions that have downwelling generally have lower productivity because the nutrients in the water column are utilized but are not resupplied by nutrient-rich water from deeper below the surface.

== Oceanic wind driven currents ==
Western boundary

- Gulf Stream – Warm Atlantic Ocean current
- Agulhas Current – Southwest Indian Ocean current off Africa's east coast
- Kuroshio Current – North-flowing current in the northwest Pacific Ocean

Eastern boundary

- Benguela Current – Ocean current in the South Atlantic
- Humboldt Current – Current of the Pacific Ocean
- California Current – Pacific Ocean current

Equatorial

- North Equatorial Current – Current in the Pacific and Atlantic Oceans
- South Equatorial Current – Ocean current in the Pacific, Atlantic, and Indian Ocean

Arctic

Atlantic

- Canary Current – Wind-driven surface current that is part of the North Atlantic Gyre

Pacific

Southern

- Antarctic Circumpolar Current, also known as West Wind Drift – Ocean current that flows clockwise from west to east around Antarctica

Oceanic gyres

- Beaufort Gyre – Wind-driven ocean current in the Arctic Ocean polar region
- Indian Ocean Gyre – Major oceanic gyre in the Indian Ocean
- North Atlantic Gyre – Major circular system of ocean currents
- North Pacific Gyre – Major circulating system of ocean currents
- Ross Gyre – Circulating system of ocean currents in the Ross Sea
- South Atlantic Gyre – Subtropical gyre in the south Atlantic Ocean
- South Pacific Gyre – Major circulating system of ocean currents
- Weddell Gyre – One of two gyres within the Southern Ocean

== Local and transient currents ==
- Surface currents caused by local wind
- Upwellings driven by local and prevailing winds.

== See also ==
- Current (stream) – Flow of water in a natural watercourse due to gravity
- Downwelling – Downwards movement of one fluid within another
- Geostrophic current – Oceanic flow in which the pressure gradient force is balanced by the Coriolis effect
- Hydrothermal circulation – Circulation of water driven by heat exchange
- Ocean current – Directional mass flow of oceanic water
- Thermohaline circulation – Part of large-scale ocean circulation
- Upwelling – Oceanographic phenomenon of wind-driven motion of ocean water
