= Underwater art =

Works that are designed for or performed in an underwater environment

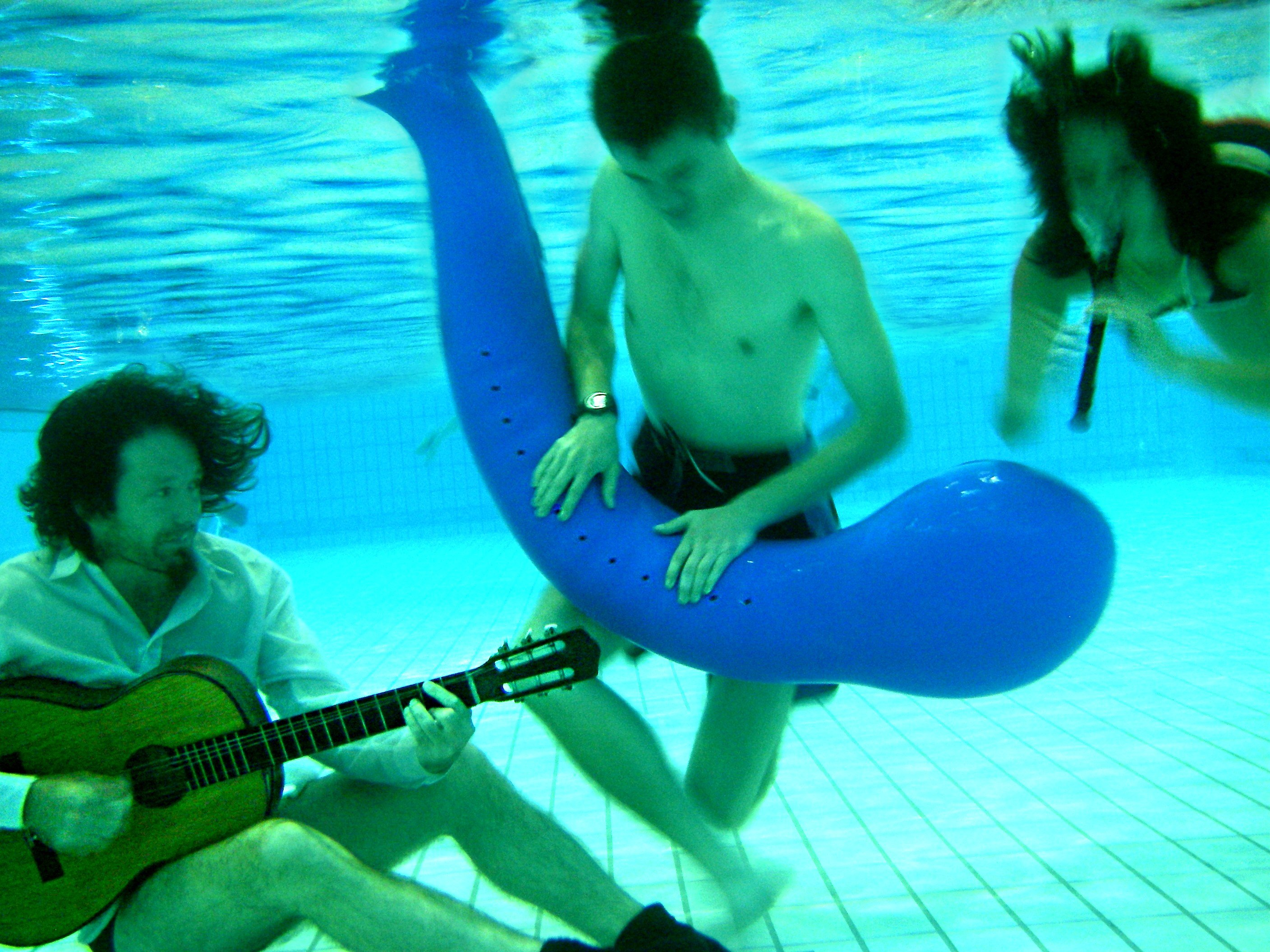
music under water

Underwater art refers to artworks that are designed for or performed in an underwater environment. Underwater art often contributes to or is inspired by state of the art scientific discoveries about subaquatic properties, such as underwater vision or underwater acoustics.

== Underwater music ==
Underwater music is a form of music composition that is tailored to the specific behavior of sound underwater. Underwater music can be performed or recorded underwater, for example in a swimming pool. The audience listens to underwater music either under or above the surface of the water, depending on how the music is played back.

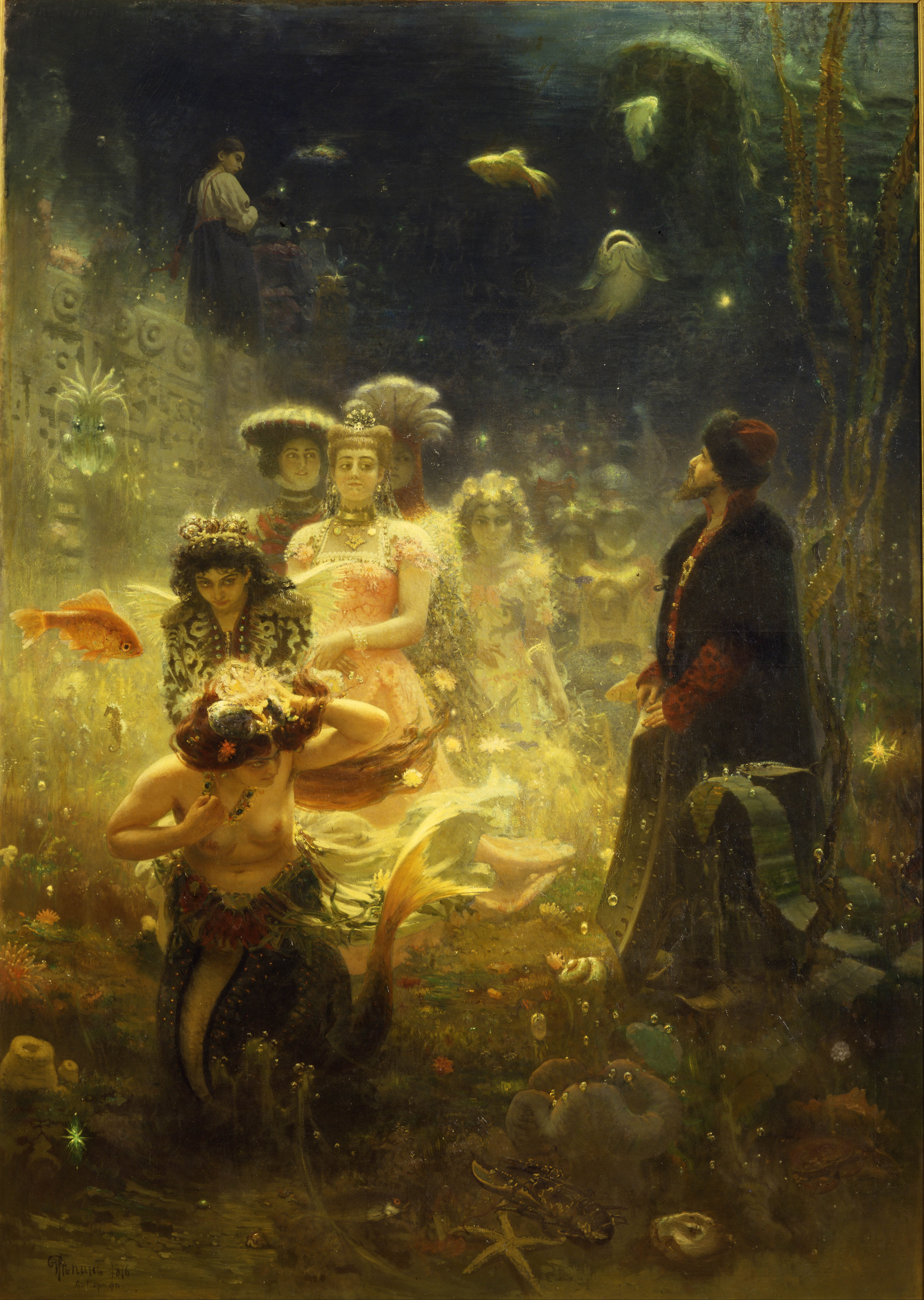
Sadko

A Florida Underwater Music Festival took place on Saturday July 9, 2022, in the Florida Keys.

== Underwater sculpture ==
Underwater sculpture is a form of sculpture that is meant to be displayed underwater. The Cancun underwater museum has specialized into exhibiting underwater sculptures made of pH-neutral cement. This type of underwater sculpture favors the regeneration of coral reefs and the growth of marine life, which is carefully monitored through bioacoustic recording. The museum visitors include snorkelers and divers. The urban artist Invader installed 3 space invaders in the Cancun underwater museum.

== Underwater painting ==
Underwater painting is a specific painting technique, which adapts painting materials, techniques, tools, and exhibition to the subaquatic conditions. André Alban was the first underwater painter. He developed his technique as part of the many inventions he created when working with Jacques Cousteau. Hussain Ihfal has adopted this painting technique in the Maldives.

== Underwater video ==
Alex Frost released a series of underwater art videos in which he opens various products underwater.

== Underwater performance ==
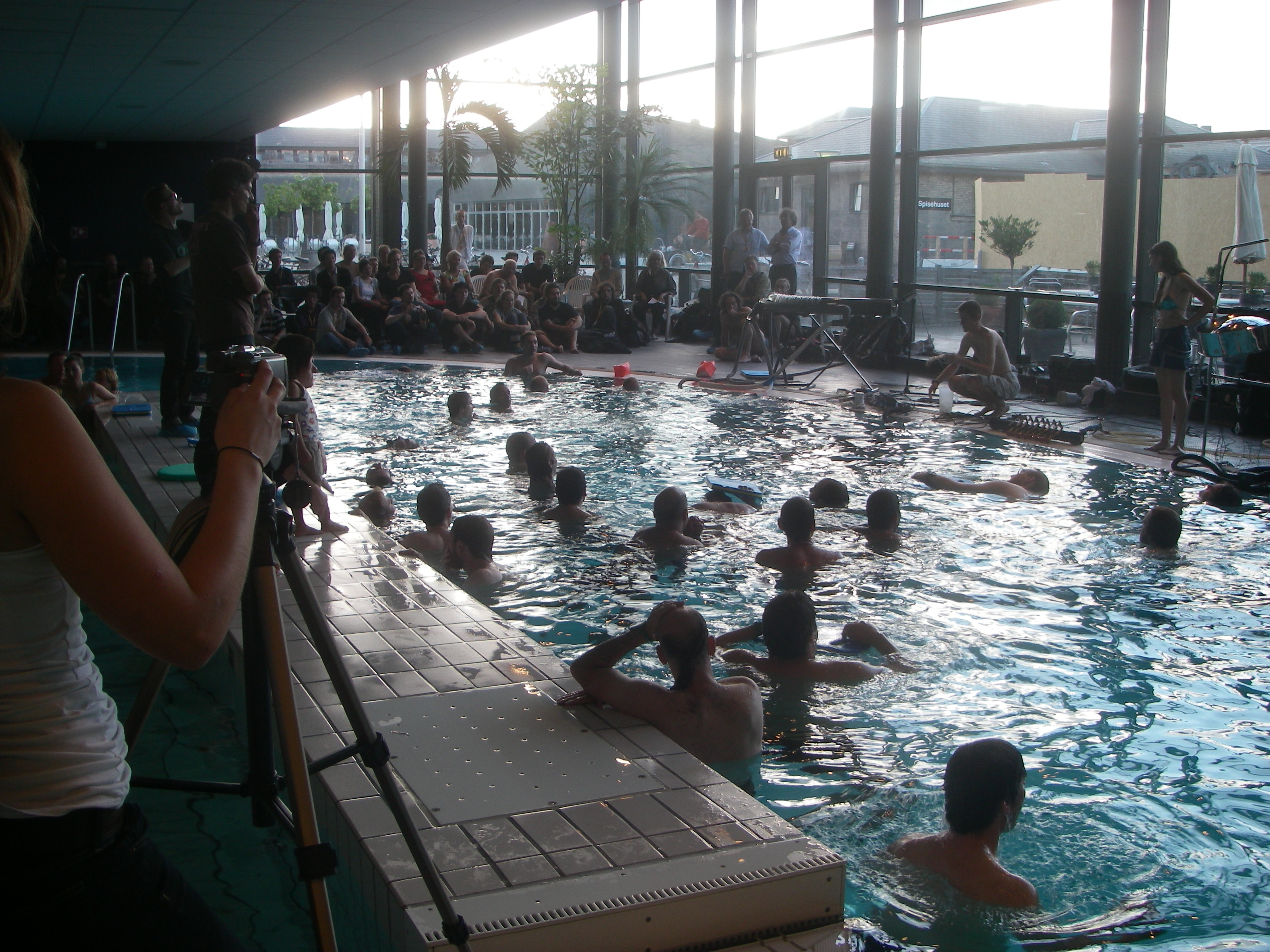
Audience members at the ICMC 2007 underwater immersed-music hydraulophone concert.

Underwater performance is a type of site-specific artistic actions in or underwater. An artwork like Big Water is a typical artwork for the genre - within this syntax available as both video art (see above) and performance art - carefully observed and crafted out primarily underwater. Here - the selected action is immersed as a non-visiting performance, by virtue of the underwater presence, and is thus - with the observers taken into account - a filmed act preserved as video art.

== Underwater artists and acts ==
- Jason deCaires Taylor, underwater sculptor
- Music for an Aquatic Ballet by John Cage
