= Underwater rugby in Australia =

Team breathhold underwater sport

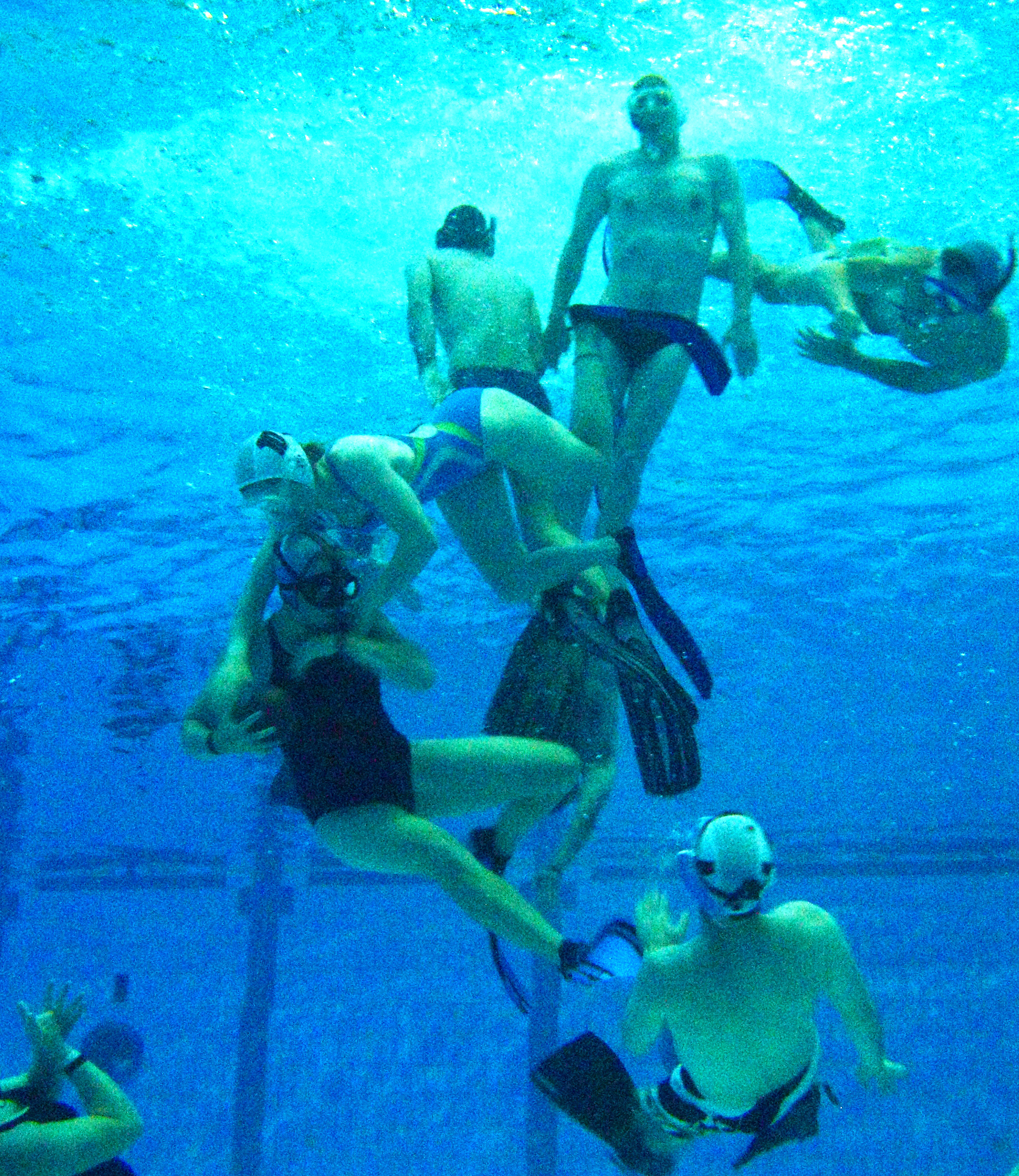
Defensive tackle during an underwater rugby match in Sydney, Australia

Underwater rugby (UWR) has been played in Australia since 2007 and as of 2016 is played in every State and the Australian Capital Territory.

== History ==
Underwater rugby has been played in Australia since 2007. Its introduction is attributed to individuals based at the University of New South Wales Underwater Club including a former member of the Colombian National Team.

== Domestic competition ==
As of 2016, UWR is played at venues in the Australian Capital Territory, New South Wales, Queensland, Tasmania, Victoria, South Australia and Western Australia. The first national tournament was held in Sydney as part of the 2013 Australian International Scuba & Underwater Sports Expo (ODEX) during September 2013.. This was followed in 2014 by the second National competition (n)Odex held in September in Ashfield NSW which saw local team UNSW UWR wrestle the national title away from inaugural champions UWR TAS. The next national competition was held in Brisbane at the Pan-Pacific Cup in April 2015: UNSW UWR won a second national title against locals Unidive Gauls UWR in a hard-fought final

== International competition ==
As of 2015, Australia has competed in third events at international level. Australia has played against New Zealand for the Ocean Hunter Trans Tasman Cup (OHTTC) in 2009, 2013 and 2014. The Australian male and female national teams played friendly games against Singapore at the Pan Pacific Cup in April 2015. The Australian male and female national teams played for the first time in a world championship event at the 10th Underwater Rugby World Championships held in Cali, Colombia during July and August 2015, finishing 11th and 7th respectively.

== Governance ==
The UWR domestic competition received recognition from the Australian Underwater Federation (AUF), the Australian affiliate of Confédération Mondiale des Activités Subaquatiques (CMAS), on 1 September 2012. As of April 2015, a Commission has been established within the AUF under the name "Underwater Rugby Australia" to administer the sport.
