= Underwater Bike Race =

Annual charity event in North Carolina

- Status: active
- Genre: sports fundraisers
- Frequency: Annually, 4th of July
- Locations: Onslow Bay, North Carolina
- Coordinates: 34°33′55″N 76°58′30″W
- Country: United States
- Most recent: July 4, 2015
- Website: www.discoverydiving.com/index.php?option=com_content&view=article&id=100&Itemid=175

The Underwater Bike Race is an annual underwater cycling charity fundraising event organized by Discovery Diving in North Carolina.

The Underwater Bike Race is held at the artificial reef created by the sinking of the USS Indra, 12 miles from Beaufort Inlet. Riders are allowed to do anything to get to the finish line. It could be swimming, pushing, pedaling, or dragging. No motorized bikes are allowed. Also, no more than one person per bike.

Underwater bicycle racing is a popular sport in the state of North Carolina. They have a traditional Underwater Bike Races a couple times a year. It is also for people to have fun with, and prepare for the races. They normally do the races of coasts or in large deep swimming pools.

There is no limit to how many people race, and only certain kinds of bikes are allowed.
