= Underwater cycling =

Stunt in which a bicycle is ridden under water

Underwater cycling is stunt, usually done for charity, in which a rider wears scuba diving gear and rides a bicycle in an underwater course. The Underwater Bike Race is an annual charity fundraiser held in North Carolina.

== Research into exercise and health effects ==
Researchers from the University of Tsukuba have conducted multiple studies about the possible benefits of cycling underwater as opposed to doing so on land. One of their studies focused on the cardiovascular response to cycling underwater, the study found that pedaling cadence and resistance both have significant impact on the cardiovascular response during underwater cycling. Another of their many studies on the subject focused on how the intensity of these exercises impacted respiratory function. This study found that there is actually no large difference in respiratory function until the workout is one of very high intensity, in which the respiratory muscles must work harder. In a third study they looked into the difference between cycling underwater and cycling on land in terms of respiratory and breathing responses. They found that breathing during underwater cycling is actually shallower, which could result in chronic effects on respiratory function if underwater cycling is executed long term
