= Underwater rugby in the United States =

Watersport played on breathhold

Underwater Rugby is a team watersport played in swimming pools on breathhold. Underwater rugby has been played in the United States since 1979.

== History ==
Nick Caloyianis started the first team at Catonsville Community College (now called Community College of Baltimore County, Catonsville). He is a famous underwater filmmaker and director, with several televised specials. Anne Arundel Community College had a competing team for several years. It was also played for a while at the YMCA pool in Severna Park, Arundel Olympic Swim Center pool in Annapolis, and briefly in a pool in Columbia and at Howard Community College. For several years after the start of UW Rugby in the USA, there were no players from Colombia, South America. However, they participated in the 1990s, with players on the men's team in the 1999 and 2003 World Championships, and on the women's team in the 2003 World Championships. Voting representatives for the international CMAS rules changes were sent to the CMAS 1987 Underwater Rugby Worlds in Zurich, Switzerland, and to the worlds in 1991 in Copenhagen, Denmark. Boston started a team a couple of years later than Baltimore and Boston still plays both Underwater Rugby and more recently underwater hockey.

Around the year 2000, UW Rugby events in the US were basically UWR Clinics on which players from different parts of the country met to play during a weekend and play on a potluck format. After fail attempts to put together a National team to go to the World Championships of 2007 in Italy and 2011 in Finland, the only active clubs in the US (East Haven Makos, New Jersey Hammerheads, and Boston Narwhals) decided to join efforts with their Canadian counterparts (CAMO, Club Liberation) and started a Local Competition called the North American Underwater Rugby Tournaments (NAT) to raise the level of the game in both countries as well as provide continuous competition throughout the years for both countries.

With the North American Tournaments (NAT) the competition and level of play started to grow the sport and additional teams began to appear and expand the NAT tournaments. New Clubs started in the DC area, Florida, and later Wisconsin and California.

NAT tournaments also became attractive to clubs from other countries and participation especially from Colombian Clubs has been an additional motivation for local clubs.

== Active USA clubs ==
Club name	City	State	Active
NORTH EAST
Boston Narwhals UW Rugby	Quincy	MA	Yes
New Jersey Hammerheads Underwater Rugby	Newark	NJ	Yes
Newark Underwater Recreation	Newark	NJ	Yes
DC Devilrays Underwater Rugby	Arlington	VA	Yes
SOUTH EAST
Florida Inter UWR	Coral Springs	FL	Yes
Tallahassee Tarpoon Underwater Rugby	Tallahassee	FL	Yes
WEST
San Francisco Giant Sea Bass	San Francisco	CA	Yes
Colorado Underwater Rugby	Denver	CO	Yes

== Inactive USA clubs ==
Club name	City	State	Active
San Diego Sea Devils	San Diego	CA	No
Connecticut Makos	New Haven	CT	No
Florida Krakens	Pompano Beach - Key Largo	FL	No
University of Illinois	Urbana - Champaign	IL	No
Baltimore	Baltimore	MD	No
Killeen Underwater Club	Killeen	TX	No
University of Texas	Austin	TX	No
Marquette Aquamen UW Rugby	Marquette	MI	No

== International competition ==
The USA National Team has only been involved 5 times in CMAS world tournaments as described below.

=== 6TH CMAS UNDERWATER RUGBY World Championship - Essen Germany 1999 ===
A combined team of players from Baltimore, Boston, and some Colombian immigrants went to the Worlds in 1999 in Germany

Men's Games

- USA (United States) 0-23 Norway
- USA (United States) 0-22 Germany
- USA (United States) 0-11 Austria
- USA (United States) 0-23 Denmark
- USA (United States) 0-20 Czech Republic
- USA (United States) 0-11 Colombia
- USA (United States) 0-17 Sweden
- USA (United States) 2-5 Austria

=== 7TH CMAS UNDERWATER RUGBY World Championship - Fredericia Denmark 2003 ===
The team for the 2003 World Championship was assembled with players from different states with a base pool set in Massachusetts, and in 2003 to Fredericia, Denmark. A combined women's team also went to Worlds in 2003.

Men's Games

- USA (United States) 2-8 Switzerland
- USA (United States) 0-14 Colombia
- USA (United States) 0-21 Germany
- USA (United States) 1-8 Czech Republic
- USA (United States) 0-12 Sweden
- USA (United States) 2-1 Turkey

Women's games

- USA (United States) 0-58 Norway
- USA (United States) 0-35 Colombia
- USA (United States) 0-17 Denmark
- USA (United States) 4-2 Turkey

=== 10TH CMAS UNDERWATER RUGBY World Championship - Cali Colombia 2015 ===
The teams for the 2015 World Championships was assembled with players from different states including MA, NJ, CT, FL, DC

Men's Games

- USA (United States) 1-10 Austria
- USA (United States) 0-11 Sweden
- USA (United States) 20-0 South Africa
- USA (United States) 2-1 Australia
- USA (United States) 1-0 Spain

Women's games

- USA (United States) 0-18 Denmark
- USA (United States) 0-27 Norway
- USA (United States) 0-30 Germany
- USA (United States) 2-8 Australia
- USA (United States) 1-5 Venezuela

=== 11TH CMAS UNDERWATER RUGBY World Championship - Graz Austria 2019 ===
The teams for the 2019 World Championships was assembled with players from different states including MA, NJ, CT, FL, DC, CA, TX

Men's Games

- USA (United States) 0-12 Sweden
- USA (United States) 16-1 (Luxembourg) Luxemburg
- USA (United States) 2-0 Hungary
- USA (United States) 1-4 Austria
- USA (United States) 5-0 (United Kingdom) Great Britain
- USA (United States) 1-3 Australia
- USA (United States) 2-1 Italy

Women's games

- USA (United States) 1-1 Turkey
- USA (United States) 2-0 Spain
- USA (United States) 0-11 Germany
- USA (United States) 0-1 Australia
- USA (United States) 0-6 Denmark
- USA (United States) 25-0 (United Kingdom) Great Britain
- USA (United States) 6-0 Italy

=== 12TH CMAS UNDERWATER RUGBY World Championship - Montreal, Canada 2023 ===
The teams for the 2023 World Championships was assembled with players from different states including MA, NJ, CT, FL, DC, CO

Men's Games

- USA (United States) 0-18 Colombia
- USA (United States) 0-10 Germany
- USA (United States) 3-1 Spain
- USA (United States) 0-3 Denmark
- USA (United States) 2-0 Canada
- USA (United States) 1-0 Australia
- USA (United States) 0-5 Sweden

Women's games

- USA (United States) 1-5 Australia
- USA (United States) 3-0 Canada
- USA (United States) 0-12 Colombia
- USA (United States) 1-10 Germany
- USA (United States) 4-1 Spain
- USA (United States) 0-5 Denmark
- USA (United States) 0-1 Austria

== Local competition ==
Local competition started jointly in the northeast with the Canadian clubs. The North American Underwater Rugby Tournaments (NAT) started in 2011 as a competition of US and Canadian Clubs with the purpose of providing local and continuous competition throughout the year in an effort to grow the sport and improve the level of play In both countries after two failed attempts to send a US National team to the 2007 and 2011 CMAS World Championships. These series of North American Tournaments were used to decide the National Champion each year for the US and Canada. Best team raked from each country was the National Champion for that year.

USA MEN'S UNDERWATER RUGBY CHAMPIONS
Year	Host	# US Teams	Champion	2nd Place	3rd Place
2011	ON	2	New Jersey Hammerheads	Boston Narwhals	N/A
2012	MA - QC - ON	4	New Jersey Hammerheads	Boston Narwhals	Connecticut Makos
2013	QC - ON	2	New Jersey Hammerheads	Boston Narwhals	N/A
2014	QC - ON	3	New Jersey Hammerheads	Boston Narwhals	SF Giant Sea Bass
2015	NJ - QC - ON	5	New Jersey Hammerheads	Connecticut Makos	NUWR Sea Lions
2016	FL - QC - ON	5	NUWR Sea Lions	New Jersey Hammerheads	Boston Narwhals
2017	NJ - CT - FL	10	NUWR Sea Lions	Boston Narwhals	Florida Krakens
2018	NJ - FL	10	Boston Narwhals	NUWR Sea Lions	New Jersey Hammerheads
2019	NJ - MA - FL	11	Boston Narwhals	New Jersey Hammerheads	Florida Krakens
2021	Denver, CO	8	New Jersey Hammerheads	NUWR Sea Lions	Boston Narwhals
2022	Hamden, CT	7	NUWR Sea Lions	New Jersey Hammerheads	Florida Inter
2023	Arlington, VA	8	New Jersey Hammerheads	NUWR Sea Lions	Boston Narwhals
2024	Coral Springs, FL	8	New Jersey Hammerheads	SF Giant Sea Bass	Florida Inter
2025	TBD	-	TBD	TBD	TBD

USA WOMEN'S UNDERWATER RUGBY CHAMPIONS
Year	Host	# Teams	Champion	2nd Place	3rd Place
2018	NJ - FL	6	Connecticut Makos	New Jersey Hammerheads	Florida Krakens
2019	NJ - MA - FL	6	Connecticut Makos	Boston Narwhals	DC Devilrays
2021	Denver, CO	4	Colorado UWR L	CT Makos L	NJ Hammerheads L
2022	Hamden, CT	5	New Jersey Hammerheads	Connecticut Makos	Colorado UWR
2023	Arlington, VA	4	New Jersey Hammerheads	DC Devilrays	Connecticut Makos
2024	Coral Springs, FL	3	New Jersey Hammerheads	Colorado UWR	DC Devilrays
2025	TBD		TBD	TBD	TBD
