= Underwater wrestling =

Underwater wrestling may refer to:

- Aquathlon (underwater wrestling)
- Suijutsu
