= United Diving Instructors =

Recreational diver training and certification agency

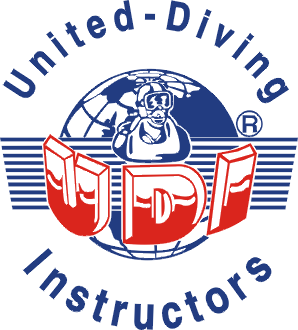
- Abbreviation: UDI
- Formation: 1983
- Headquarters: Nuremberg, Germany
- Leader: Peter Dolezyk
- Website: http://www.u-d-i.de

The United Diving Instructors (UDI) is the diver training organization founded in 1983 by Z. Fisher and H. G. Golzing in California, United States.

== Kids programs ==
- Junior Diver *
- Junior Diver **
- Junior Diver ***

== Recreational diving certifications ==
- Pool Diver
- Basic Diver
- Open Water Diver
- Advanced Open Water Diver
- Special Diver

== Specialty courses ==
UDI provide a range of specialty courses, examples of which include:

- Orientation and Compass Diver
- Night Diver
- Deep Diver
- Rescue Diver
- Dry-Suit Diver
- Drift Diver
- Mountain Lake Diver
- Cave Cavern Diver
- Ice Diver
- Diving Technician
- Compress Diver
- Wreck Diver
- Mixed Gas Diver
- Apnea Diver

== Professional certifications ==
- Open Water Instructor *
- International Instructor **
- Staff Instructor ***
- Honorary Master Instructor ****

== See also ==
- Scuba diving – Swimming underwater, breathing gas carried by the diver
- List of diver certification organizations – Agencies which issue certification for competence in diving skills
- Diver training – Processes to develop the skills and knowledge to dive safely underwater
- Recreational diving – Diving for the purpose of leisure and enjoyment
