= Towboard =

Underwater survey equipment used to tow a diver

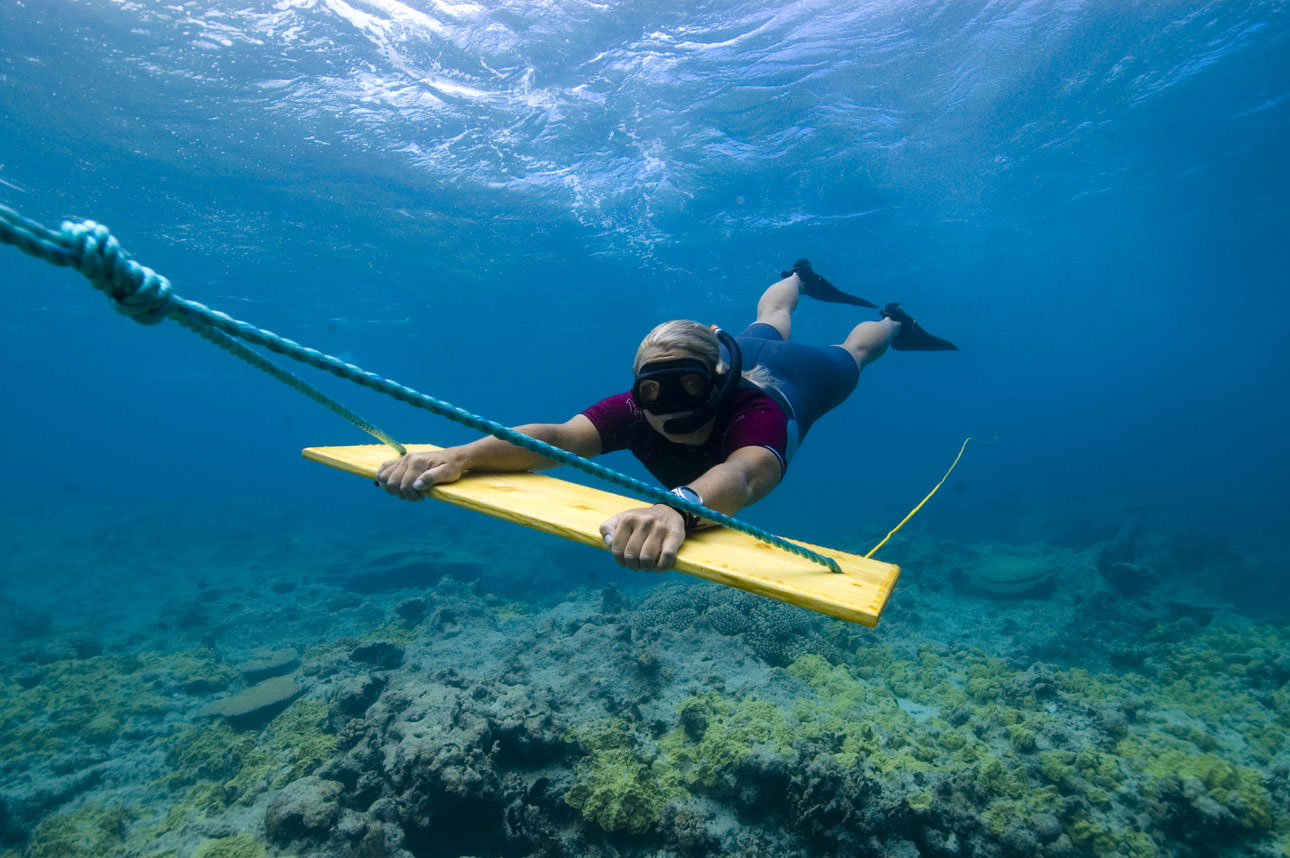
- A towboard being used by a NOAA archaeologist to search for shipwrecks in the Papahanaumokuakea Marine National Monument
- Uses: Towed diver search or survey
- Related items: Diver propulsion vehicle

A towboard is a piece of aquatic survey equipment consisting of a board attached to a rope that is towed by a surface vessel. It is used to tow one or more divers underwater at a constant depth to survey bottom features such as coral reefs. The diver may use a scuba set, or if only a snorkel, may remain at the surface, or travel underwater for around two minutes.

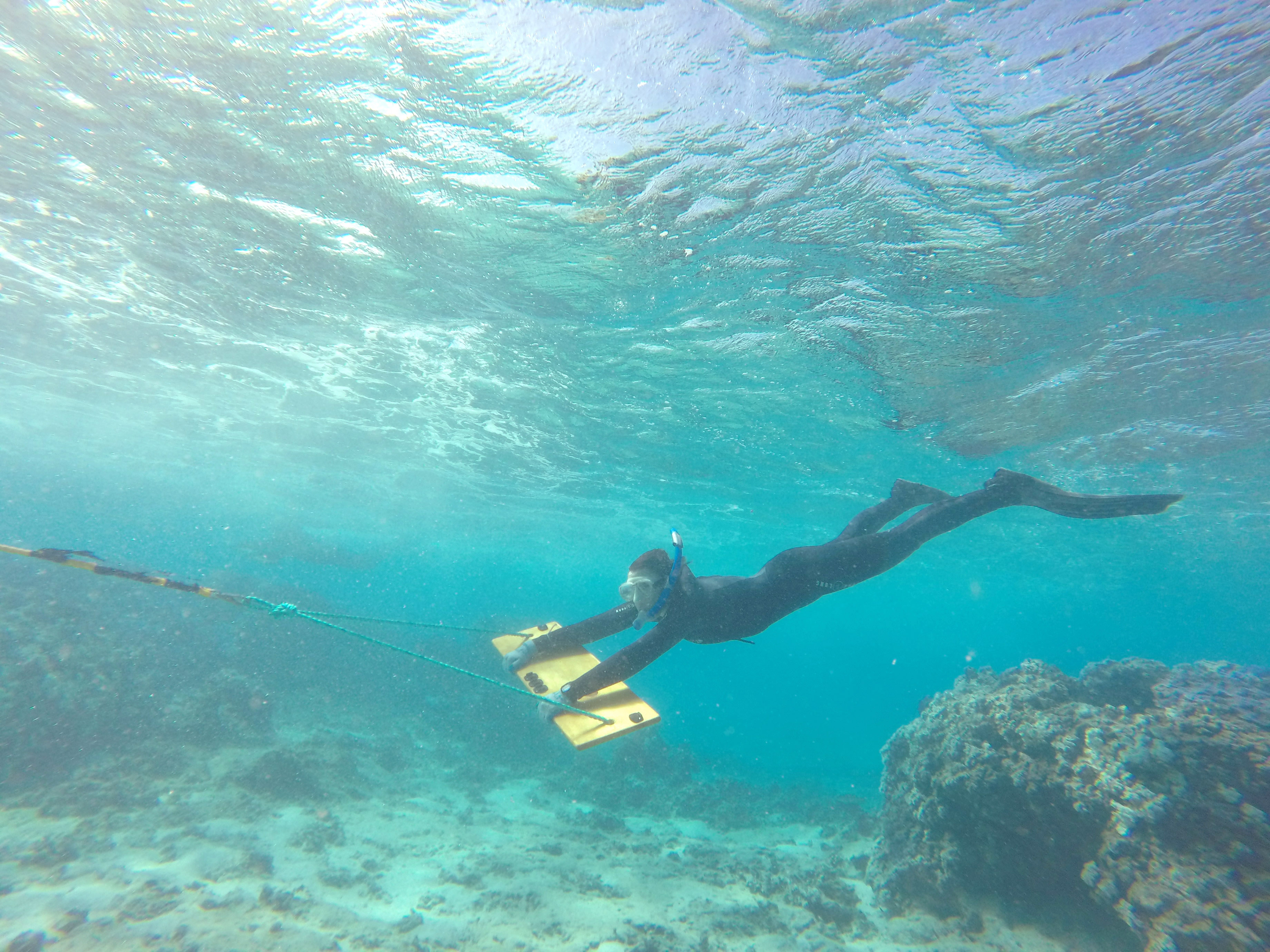
Towboard survey at Midway Atoll

The towing vessel travels at approximately 1 to 2 miles per hour and may tow two divers, one with a camera pointing down, and other with a camera facing forward. The boat follows a depth contour to keep the towboard over a specific depth. The divers can also maneuver the board to maintain a more precise depth and avoid obstacles. A survey may cover up to nearly 2 miles over a period of around 50 minutes.

This type of surveying method is called a towboard survey, towed-diver survey, and the manta tow technique, the latter named after the Manta Board, an oval towboard marketed for recreational use. A variant is the SAM or "Single-armed Manta-board". This consists of a small board with a strap to secure and tow the diver by the forearm. This frees the other arm, allowing the diver to take notes on a pad held by the towing arm.

The use of a towboard is considered safe for NOAA reef surveys by trained divers at depths where no decompression stops are required (down to approximately 90 feet).

Towboards may be equipped with sensors to record the temperature and depth every few seconds and the tow vessel may have a GPS to record position. Position of the diver is approximate and must be calculated from the boat position, heading and towline length.
