= Welsh Association of Sub Aqua Clubs =

Former governing body of sub-aqua in Wales

The Welsh Association of Sub Aqua Clubs (Welsh: Cwmdeithas Clybiau Tanddwr Cymru) (WASAC) was the national governing body (NGB) for sub-aqua in Wales until January 2016. Sub Aqua is a broad term encompassing both recreational underwater activities such as recreational diving and snorkelling, and competitive underwater activities including underwater sports as underwater hockey

Although WASAC was responsible for underwater hockey (also known as Octopush), training and management of Wales national squads is controlled by Underwater Hockey Wales (UHW).

The WASAC was based at Gwaun-Cae-Gurwen, Neath Port Talbot.

The WASAC was replaced by the British Sub Aqua Club (the official NGB for the entire United Kingdom) as the governing body for Sub Aqua in Wales from January 2016.

== See also ==
- List of sports governing bodies in Wales
