= Thalmann algorithm =

Mathematical model for diver decompression

The Thalmann Algorithm (VVAL 18) is a deterministic decompression model originally designed in 1980 to produce a decompression schedule for divers using the US Navy Mk15 rebreather. It was developed by Capt. Edward D. Thalmann, MD, USN, who did research into decompression theory at the Naval Medical Research Institute, Navy Experimental Diving Unit, State University of New York at Buffalo, and Duke University. The algorithm forms the basis for the current US Navy mixed gas and standard air dive tables (from US Navy Diving Manual Revision 6). The decompression model is also referred to as the Linear–Exponential model or the Exponential–Linear model.

== History ==
The Mk15 rebreather supplies a constant partial pressure of oxygen of 0.7 bar (70 kPa) with nitrogen as the inert gas. Prior to 1980 it was operated using schedules from printed tables. It was determined that an algorithm suitable for programming into an underwater decompression monitor (an early dive computer) would offer advantages. This algorithm was initially designated "MK15 (VVAL 18) RTA", a real-time algorithm for use with the Mk15 rebreather.

== Description ==
VVAL 18 is a deterministic model that utilizes the Naval Medical Research Institute Linear Exponential (NMRI LE1 PDA) data set for calculation of decompression schedules. Phase two testing of the US Navy Diving Computer produced an acceptable algorithm with an expected maximum incidence of decompression sickness (DCS) less than 3.5% assuming that occurrence followed the binomial distribution at the 95% confidence level.

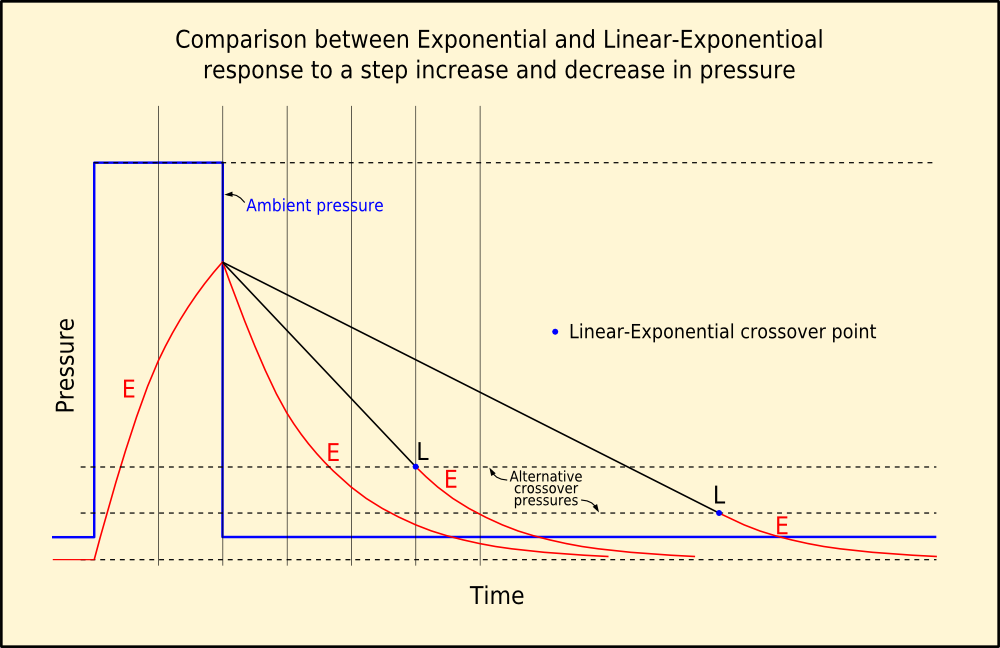
Response of a tissue compartment to a step increase and decrease in pressure showing Exponential-Exponential and two possibilities for Linear-Exponential uptake and washout

The use of simple symmetrical exponential gas kinetics models has shown up the need for a model that would give slower tissue washout. In the early 1980s the US Navy Experimental Diving Unit developed an algorithm using a decompression model with exponential gas absorption as in the usual Haldanian model, but a slower linear release during ascent. The effect of adding linear kinetics to the exponential model is to lengthen the duration of risk accumulation for a given compartment time constant.

The model was originally developed for programming decompression computers for constant oxygen partial pressure closed circuit rebreathers. Initial experimental diving using an exponential-exponential algorithm resulted in an unacceptable incidence of DCS, so a change was made to a model using the linear release model, with a reduction in DCS incidence. The same principles were applied to developing an algorithm and tables for a constant oxygen partial pressure model for Heliox diving

The linear component is active when the tissue pressure exceeds ambient pressure by a given amount specific to the tissue compartment. When the tissue pressure drops below this cross-over criterion the tissue is modelled by exponential kinetics. During gas uptake tissue pressure never exceeds ambient, so it is always modelled by exponential kinetics. This results in a model with the desired asymmetrical characteristics of slower washout than uptake. The linear/exponential transition is smooth. Choice of cross-over pressure determines the slope of the linear region as equal to the slope of the exponential region at the cross-over point.

During the development of these algorithms and tables, it was recognized that a successful algorithm could be used to replace the existing collection of incompatible tables for various air and Nitrox diving modes currently in the US Navy Diving Manual with a set of mutually compatible decompression tables based on a single model, which was proposed by Gerth and Doolette in 2007. This has been done in Revision 6 of the US Navy Diving Manual published in 2008, though some changes were made.

=== Implementation in dive computers ===
An independent implementation of the EL-Real Time Algorithm was developed by Cochran Consulting, Inc. for the diver-carried Navy Dive Computer under the guidance of E. D. Thalmann.

Since the discontinuation of Cochran Undersea Technology after the death of the owner, the algorithm has been implemented on some models of Shearwater Research's dive computers for use by the US Navy.

=== Physiological interpretation ===
Computer testing of a theoretical bubble growth model reported by Ball, Himm, Homer and Thalmann produced results which led to the interpretation of the three compartments used in the probabilistic LE model, with fast (1.5min), intermediate (51 min) and slow (488min) time constants, of which only the intermediate compartment uses the linear kinetics modification during decompression, as possibly not representing distinct anatomically identifiable tissues, but three different kinetic processes which relate to different elements of DCS risk.

They conclude that bubble evolution may not be sufficient to explain all aspects of DCS risk, and the relationship between gas phase dynamics and tissue injury requires further investigation.
