= Underwater Hockey Wales =

Welsh underwater hockey association

Underwater Hockey Wales (UHW; Welsh: Hoci Tanddwr Cymreig; HTC) is responsible for underwater hockey (also known as Octopush) in Wales. It is the association representing British Octopush Association (BOA) clubs based in Wales. Underwater Hockey Wales is affiliated to the Welsh Association of Sub Aqua Clubs – the national governing body for underwater sports in Wales, comprising scuba diving, underwater hockey, and snorkelling.

Underwater Hockey Wales aims to establish a structured and stable underwater hockey organization in Wales, to support individual, club and regional development. Underwater Hockey Wales is responsible for the training and management of Welsh national squads. The first training camp for the Wales national team was in November 2019 and further camps have taken place every few months. Its objective is to create and maintain competitive Welsh underwater hockey squads in all categories, to compete in both regional competitions and in the BOA home international tournaments.

Underwater Hockey Wales is also responsible for organising the Welsh national championships for Welsh clubs teams which occurs on an annual basis. The most recent edition was its 46th held in 2022.

The British Octopush Association currently has four of its 70 associated clubs in Wales, a large reduction since the COVID-19 pandemic, these are: Bangor University, Cardiff and Newport, Llwchwr, and Pembroke. Pembroke is Wales most successful club, often winning the Welsh national championships, and regularly qualifying in the finals of the British national championship and competing in the top division of Nautilus.

Wales national team results

Celtic Cup

The Celtic Cup began in 2022 and is an annual tournament for Wales, Scotland, and Ireland national underwater hockey teams.

Year	A Team	B Team	Ref.
2022	2nd	5th	
2023	Did not participate		
2024	2nd	—	

Restart

A special one-off post COVID-19 restart tournament took place in August 2021 which saw the Wales national team finished first in D Division.

Welsh National Championship winners

As of 2022

Club	Titles	Ref.
Llwchwr	13	
Pembroke	12	
Cwmtawe	3	
Aberystwyth University	2	
Other	16	

== See also ==
- List of sports governing bodies in Wales
