= Edward D. Thalmann =

American hyperbaric medicine specialist (1945-2004)

Edward Deforest Thalmann
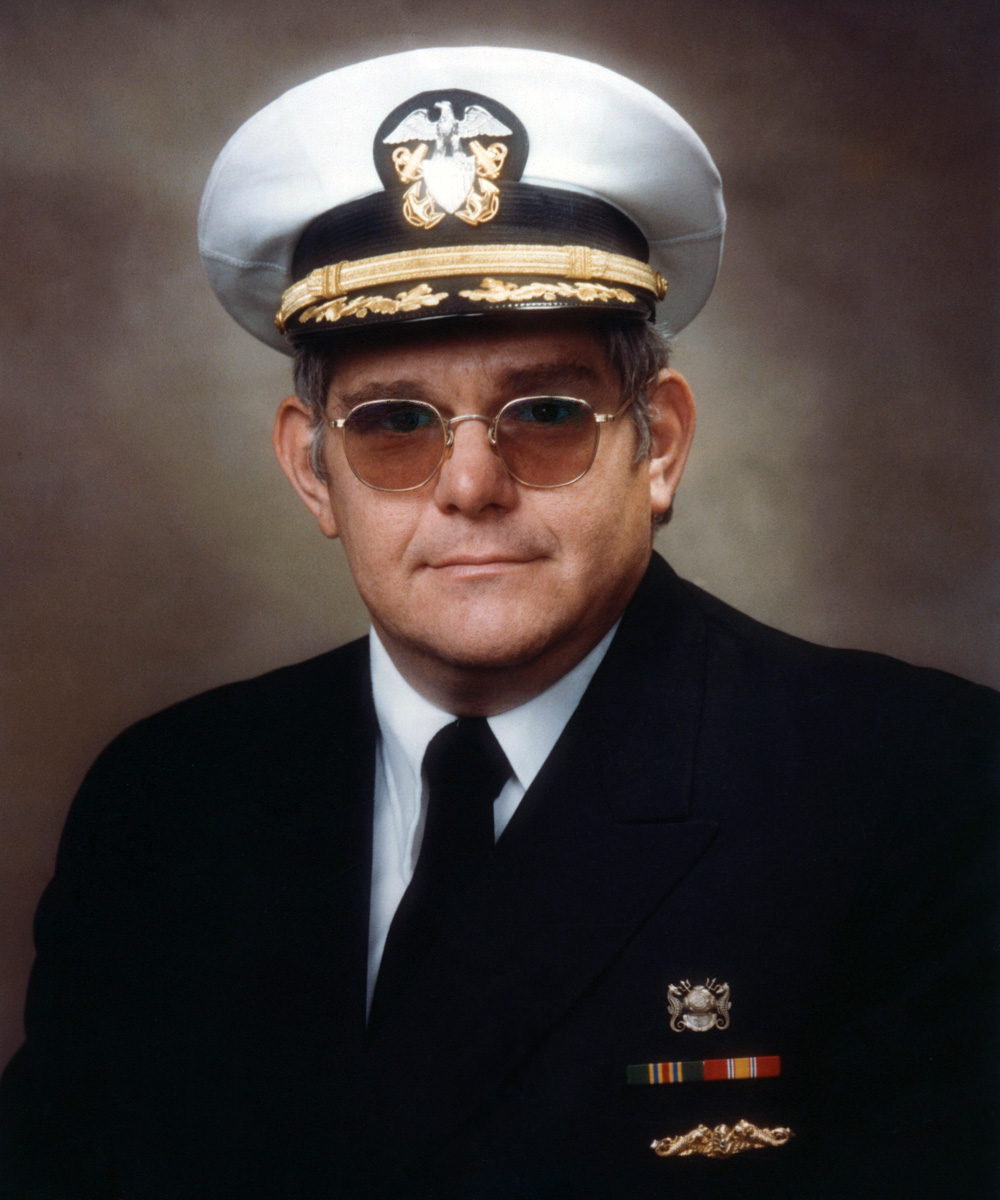
- Edward D. Thalmann, MD, expert in hyperbaric medicine
- Born: April 3, 1945; Jersey City, New Jersey
- Died: July 24, 2004 (aged 59); Durham, North Carolina
- Relatives: Alexander E. Thalmann (nephew)
- Military career
- Allegiance: United States
- Branch: United States Navy
- Service years: 1971–1993
- Rank: Captain
- Awards: Legion of Merit; Meritorious Service Medal; Navy Unit Commendation; Navy and Marine Corps Meritorious Unit Commendation with service star National Defense Service Medal with service star Navy and Marine Corps Overseas Service Ribbon with service star
- Other work: Naval Medical Research Institute; Duke University; Divers Alert Network

Capt. Edward Deforest Thalmann, USN (ret.) (April 3, 1945 – July 24, 2004) was an American hyperbaric medicine specialist who was principally responsible for developing the current United States Navy dive tables for mixed-gas diving, which are based on his eponymous Thalmann Algorithm (VVAL18). At the time of his death, Thalmann was serving as assistant medical director of the Divers Alert Network (DAN) and an assistant clinical professor in anesthesiology at Duke University's Center for Hyperbaric Medicine and Environmental Physiology.

== Education ==
Raised in South Amboy, New Jersey, Thalmann graduated in 1962 from Sayreville War Memorial High School in Sayreville, New Jersey. He attended the Rensselaer Polytechnic Institute, graduating in 1966 with a bachelor of science degree. He attended medical school at Georgetown University in Washington, D.C. From 1970 to 1971, Thalmann was a surgical intern at the Royal Victoria Hospital in Montreal, Quebec. It was there that he met his future wife, a nursing graduate.

While on active duty, from 1975 to 1977, Thalmann conducted a two-year postdoctoral fellowship under the guidance of Claes Lundgren and Hermann Rahn, at the State University of New York at Buffalo, studying the effects of immersion and breathing bag placement in rebreathers on underwater exercise.

== Naval career ==
Thalmann served as Chief Medical Officer on board the ballistic missile submarine USS Thomas Jefferson for a single deployment, from 1971 to 1972 before being posted as a research diving medical officer at the United States Navy Experimental Diving Unit (NEDU) at the Washington Navy Yard, where he was stationed until 1975.

Following his post-doctoral fellowship in Buffalo, in 1977, Thalmann returned to NEDU, now located in Panama City, Florida, as Assistant Senior Medical Officer, where he began developing new dive tables and mixed-gas diving techniques. While at NEDU, Thalmann created a number of unique and innovative underwater exercise devices, still in use today, intended to assist in gauging the underwater endurance of divers using various gas mixtures while performing physically demanding tasks.

In 1985, Thalmann, at that time the Senior Medical Officer at NEDU, was selected for the NATO Undersea Medicine Personnel Exchange Program and assigned to the Royal Navy Institute of Naval Medicine, Alverstoke, United Kingdom. There he continued development of a new decompression table and worked on improving undersea thermal protection garments. Upon the conclusion of his exchange tour in 1987, Thalmann returned to Bethesda to serve as the commander of the Naval Medical Research Institute's diving medicine and physiology research division.

== Civilian career ==
Following his retirement from the Navy in 1993, Thalmann stayed on at NMRI as a senior scientist in decompression research. In July 1994 took a position in Durham, North Carolina at Duke's Center for Hyperbaric Medicine and Environmental Physiology and later accepted a simultaneous position as the Assistant Medical Director of DAN in 1995.

Thalmann died on July 24, 2004, in Durham, due to congestive heart failure, at the age of 59. He was committed to the sea on August 31, 2004, with services conducted aboard USS Maryland, an Ohio-class submarine, off the coast of Kings Bay, Georgia at 30°57′00″N 79°53′30″W.

== Contributions to hyperbaric medicine ==
Based on scientific studies of gas exchange in human tissues, further informed by his supervision of hundreds of experimental dives, Thalmann developed his namesake mathematical algorithm to protect divers from decompression sickness. The Thalmann algorithm was the basis for a new set of decompression tables that provided more flexibility for diving time, depth, gas mixtures and pressures. The algorithm was also used for developing wearable dive computers to manage complex individual dives. Thalmann's research ultimately improved decompression safety for military divers, recreational divers, and even astronauts.

== Awards ==

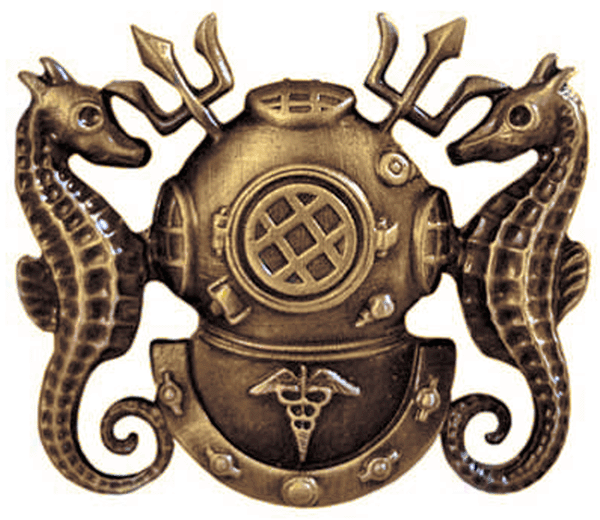

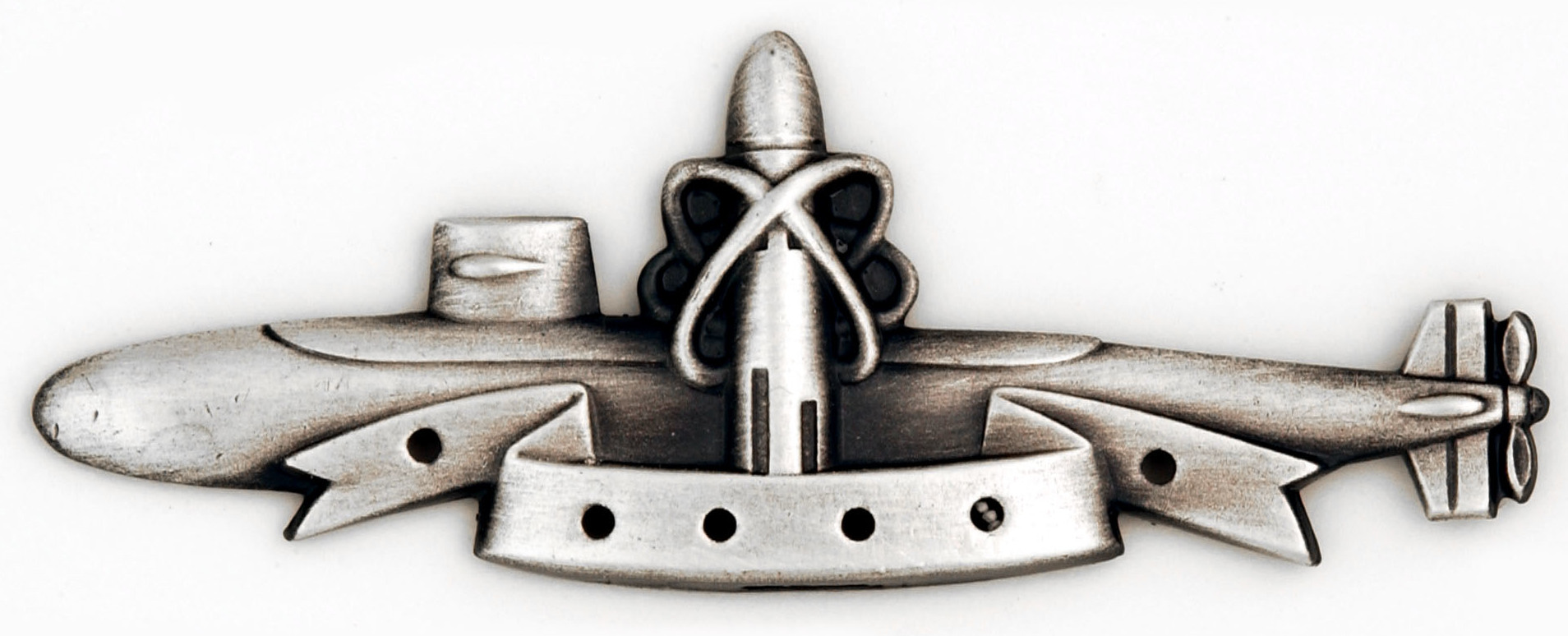

Submarine Medical insignia
Legion of Merit	Meritorious Service Medal	Navy Unit Commendation
Meritorious Unit Commendation with star	National Defense Service Medal with star	Navy and Marine Corps; Overseas Service Ribbon with star
Diving Medical Officer badge		SSBN Deterrent Patrol insignia

== Publications ==
=== Refereed journals ===
- Raymond, L. W.; J. H. Crothers; G. Lindgren; E. D. Thalmann; W. H. Spaur; W. R. Braithwaite; H. C. Langworthy; T. E. Berghage (1973). "Indirect calorimetry in man in helium-oxygen at 50 atmospheres pressure". Clin. Res. 21 (4): 848.
- Raymond, L. W.; E. D. Thalmann; G. Lindgren; H. C. Langworthy; W. H. Spaur; J. H. Crothers; W. R. Braithwaite; Berghage, T. E. (1975). "Thermal homeostasis of resting man in helium-oxygen at 1-50 atmospheres absolute". Undersea Biomed. Res. 2 (1): 51–67. ISSN 0093-5387. OCLC 2068005. PMID 1181708. Archived from the original on July 27, 2011.
- Berghage, T. E.; L. E. Lash; W. R. Braithwaite; E. D. Thalmann (1975). "Intentional tremor on a helium-oxygen chamber dive to 49.5 ATA". Undersea Biomed. Res. 2 (3): 215–22. ISSN 0093-5387. OCLC 2068005. PMID 15622740. Archived from the original on July 27, 2011.
- Spaur, W. H.; L. W. Raymond; M. M. Knott; J. H. Crothers; W. R. Braithwaite; E. D. Thalmann; D. F. Uddin (1977). "Dyspnea in divers at 49.5 ATA: Mechanical, not chemical in origin". Undersea Biomed. Res. 4 (2): 183–98. ISSN 0093-5387. OCLC 2068005. PMID 878071. Archived from the original on July 27, 2011.
- Raymond, L. W.; W. H. Spaur; E. D. Thalmann (1978). "Prevention of divers' ear". Br Med J. 1 (6104): 48. doi:10.1136/bmj.1.6104.48-d. PMC 1602449. PMID 620150.
- Spaur, W. H.; E. D. Thalmann; E. T. Flynn; J. L. Zumrick; T. W.Reedy; J. M. Ringleberg (1978). "Development of unlimited duration excursion tables and procedures for helium-oxygen saturation diving". Undersea Biomed. Res. 5 (2): 159–177. ISSN 0093-5387. OCLC 2068005. PMID 675881. Archived from the original on July 27, 2011.
- Thalmann, E. D.; D. K. Sponholtz; C. E. G. Lundgren (1978). "Chamber-based system for physiological monitoring of submerged exercising subjects". Undersea Biomed. Res. 5 (3): 293–300. ISSN 0093-5387. OCLC 2068005. PMID 705946. Archived from the original on July 27, 2011.
- Van Liew, H. D.; E. D. Thalmann; D. K. Sponholtz (1979). "Diffusion-dependence of pulmonary gas mixing at 5.5 and 9.5 ATA". Undersea Biomed. Res. 6 (3): 251–258. ISSN 0093-5387. OCLC 2068005. PMID 524527. Archived from the original on July 27, 2011.
- Thalmann, E. D.; D. K. Sponholtz; C. E. G. Lundgren (1979). "Effects of immersion and static lung loading on submerged exercise at depth". Undersea Biomed. Res. 6 (3): 259–290. ISSN 0093-5387. OCLC 2068005. PMID 524528. Archived from the original on July 27, 2011.
- Piantadosi, C. A.; R. L. Clinton; E. D. Thalmann (1979). "Prolonged oxygen exposures in immersed exercising divers at 25 fsw (1.76 ATA)". Undersea Biomed. Res. 6 (4): 347–356. ISSN 0093-5387. OCLC 2068005. PMID 538863. Archived from the original on July 27, 2011.
- Piantadosi, C. A.; E. D. Thalmann (1980). "Thermal responses in humans exposed to cold hyperbaric helium-oxygen". J. Appl. Physiol. 49 (6): 1099–1106. doi:10.1152/jappl.1980.49.6.1099. ISSN 0021-8987. OCLC 11603017. PMID 7440297.
- Piantadosi, C. A.; E. D. Thalmann; W. H. Spaur (1981). "Metabolic response to respiratory heat loss and core cooling". J. Appl. Physiol. 50 (4): 829–830. doi:10.1152/jappl.1981.50.4.829. ISSN 0021-8987. OCLC 11603017. PMID 7263366.
- Van Liew, H. D.; E. D. Thalmann; D. K. Sponholtz (1981). "Diffusive gas mixing in the lung in hyperbaric environments". Prog. Resp. Res. Progress in Respiratory Research. 16: 110–114. doi:10.1159/000395131. ISBN 978-3-8055-1638-9.
- Van Liew, H. D.; E. D. Thalmann; D. K. Sponholtz (1981). "Hindrance to diffusive gas mixing in the lung in hyperbaric environments". J. Appl. Physiol. 51 (2): 243–247. doi:10.1152/jappl.1981.51.2.243. ISSN 0021-8987. OCLC 11603017. PMID 7263431.
- Butler, F. K.; E. D. Thalmann (1983). "Report of an isolated mid-frequency hearing loss following inner ear barotrauma". Undersea Biomed. Res. 10 (2): 131–134. ISSN 0093-5387. OCLC 2068005. PMID 6612898. Archived from the original on July 27, 2011.
- Thalmann, E. D. (1983). "Phenytoin sodium in oxygen-toxicity-induced seizures". Annals of Emergency Medicine. 12 (9): 592–3. doi:10.1016/S0196-0644(83)80324-2. PMID 6614618.
- Butler, F. K.; E. D. Thalmann (1986). "Central Nervous System Oxygen Toxicity in Closed Circuit SCUBA Divers II". Undersea Biomed. Res. 13 (2): 193–223. ISSN 0093-5387. OCLC 2068005. PMID 3727183. Archived from the original on August 20, 2008.
- Thalmann, E. D. (1989). "Testing of revised unlimited-duration upward excursions during helium-oxygen saturation dives". Undersea Biomed. Res. 16 (3): 195–218. ISSN 0093-5387. OCLC 2068005. PMID 2741254. Archived from the original on July 27, 2011.
- Weathersby, P. K.; S. S. Survanshi; L. D. Homer; E. Parker; E. D. Thalmann (1992). "Predicting the time of occurrence of decompression sickness". J. Appl. Physiol. 72 (4): 1541–1548. doi:10.1152/jappl.1992.72.4.1541. ISSN 0021-8987. OCLC 11603017. PMID 1592748.
- Stevens, D. M.; B. G. Caras; E. T. Flynn; A. J. Dutka; J. W. Thorp; E. D. Thalmann (1992). "Management of herniated intervertebral disks during saturation dives: a case report". Undersea Biomed. Res. 19 (3): 191–8. ISSN 0093-5387. OCLC 2068005. PMID 1534427.
- Joye, D. D.; J. R. Clarke; N. A. Carlson; E. D. Thalmann (1994). "Characterization and measurement of elastance with application to underwater breathing apparatus". Undersea Hyperb. Med. 21 (1): 53–658. ISSN 1066-2936. OCLC 26915585. PMID 8180567. Archived from the original on August 11, 2011.
- Ball, R.; J. Himm; L.D. Homer; E. D. Thalmann (1995). "Does the time course of bubble evolution explain decompression sickness risk?". Undersea Hyperb. Med. 22 (3): 263–280. ISSN 1066-2936. OCLC 26915585. PMID 7580767. Archived from the original on August 11, 2011.
- Jiang, Y.; L.D. Homer; E. D. Thalmann (1996). "Development and interactions of two inert gas bubbles during decompression". Undersea Hyperb. Med. 23 (3): 131–140. ISSN 1066-2936. OCLC 26915585. PMID 8931280. Archived from the original on August 11, 2011.
- Thalmann, E. D.; Parker E. C.; S.S. Survanshi; P. K. Weathersby (1997). "Improved probabilistic decompression model risk predictions using linear-exponential kinetics". Undersea Hyperb. Med. 24 (4): 255–274. ISSN 1066-2936. OCLC 26915585. PMID 9444058. Archived from the original on August 11, 2011.
- Clayton, C. E.; M. S. Carraway; H. B. Suliman; E. D. Thalmann; K. N. Thalmann; D. E. Schmechel; C. A. Piantadosi (2001). "Inhaled carbon monoxide and hyperoxic lung injury in rats". Am J Physiol Lung Cell Mol Physiol. 281 (4): L949–57. CiteSeerX 10.1.1.973.8872. doi:10.1152/ajplung.2001.281.4.L949. PMID 11557599. S2CID 31134015.
- Pollock, N. W.; M. J. Natoli; W. A. Gerth; E. D. Thalmann; R. D. Vann (2003). "Risk of decompression sickness during exposure to high cabin altitude after diving". Aviat Space Environ Med. 74 (11): 1163–8. ISSN 0095-6562. PMID 14620473.
- Piantadosi, C. A.; E. D. Thalmann (2004). "Pathology: whales, sonar and decompression sickness". Nature. 428 (6984): 1 p following 716, discussion 2 p following 716. doi:10.1038/nature02527a. PMID 15085881. S2CID 4391838.
- Vann, R. D.; W. A. Gerth; P. J. DeNoble; C. F. Pieper; E. D. Thalmann (2004). "Experimental trials to assess the risks of decompression sickness in flying after diving". Undersea Hyperb. Med. 31 (4): 431–44. ISSN 1066-2936. OCLC 26915585. PMID 15686274. Archived from the original on August 22, 2009.
- Demchenko, I. T.; Y. I. Luchakov; A. N. Moskvin; D. R. Gutsaeva; B. W. Allen; E. D. Thalmann; C. A. Piantadosi (2005). "Cerebral blood flow and brain oxygenation in rats breathing oxygen under pressure". J Cereb Blood Flow Metab. 25 (10): 1288–300. doi:10.1038/sj.jcbfm.9600110. PMID 15789033.

=== Non-refereed journals and reports ===
- Thalmann, E. D. (1974). "A prophylactic program for the prevention of otitis externa in saturation divers". Navy Exp. Diving Unit Res. Report. 10–74. Archived from the original on August 20, 2008.
- Thalmann, E. D.; M. M. Knott; J. C. Cr; et al. (1974). "Determination of the adequacy of helmet ventilation in the Navy MK 12 and MK 5 hard-hat diving apparatus". Navy Exp. Diving Unit Res. Report. 16–74.
- Spaur, W. H.; E. D. Thalmann; R. C. Maulbeck (1978). "Carbon dioxide absorbent canister studies of the hot water heated, helium-oxygen mode, MK 12 surface-supplied diving system". Navy Exp. Diving Unit Res. Report. 20–78.
- Spaur, W. H.; E. D. Thalmann; R. C. Maulbeck (1979). "MK 12 surface-supplied diving system helium-oxygen emergency mode study". Navy Exp. Diving Unit Res. Report. 8–79.
- Piantadosi, C. A.; D. J. Ball; M. L. Nuckols; E. D. Thalmann (1979). "Manned evaluation of the NCSC diver thermal protection (DTP) passive system prototype". Navy Exp. Diving Unit Res. Report. 13–79. Archived from the original on February 10, 2009.
- Piantadosi, C. A.; E. D. Thalmann; W. H. Spaur (1980). "Improved life support capability in the MK 11 semi-closed circuit UBA by modification of the carbon dioxide absorbent canister". Navy Exp. Diving Unit Res. Report. 5–80.
- Thalmann, E. D.; I. P. B. Buckingham; W. H. Spaur (1980). "Testing of decompression algorithms for use in the U.S. Navy underwater decompression computer (Phase I)". Navy Exp. Diving Unit Res. Report. 11–80.
- Gray, C. G.; E. D. Thalmann. (1980). "Manned evaluation of the pre-production MK 16 underwater breathing apparatus". Navy Exp. Diving Unit Res. Report. 13–80.
- Gray, C. G.; E. D. Thalmann; R. Syklawer (1981). "United States Coast Guard emergency underwater escape rebreather evaluation". Navy Exp. Diving Unit Res. Report. 2–81.
- Middleton, J. R.; E. D. Thalmann. (1981). "Manned evaluation of the pre-production MK 16 underwater breathing apparatus". Navy Exp. Diving Unit Res. Report. 3–81.
- Gray, C. G.; E. D. Thalmann. (1981). "Manned evaluation of Field Change 9/85 to the MK 11 UBA CO2 absorbent canister". Navy Exp. Diving Unit Res. Report. 4–81.
- Thalmann, E. D. (1983). "Computer algorithms used in computing the MK15/16 constant 0.7 ATA oxygen partial pressure decompression tables". Navy Exp. Diving Unit Res. Report. 1–83.
- Jaggaers, F. R.; E. D. Thalmann. (1983). "Manned evaluation of MK 15 closed circuit UBA canister duration at 13.4 °C and 2 °C". Navy Exp. Diving Unit Res. Report. 6–83.
- Thalmann, E. D.; F. K. Butler. (1983). "A procedure for doing multiple level dives on air using repetitive groups". Navy Exp. Diving Unit Res. Report. 13–83.
- Thalmann, E. D. (1984). "Phase II testing of decompression algorithms for use in the U.S. Navy underwater decompression computer". Navy Exp. Diving Unit Res. Report. 1–84.
- Butler, F. K.; E. D. Thalmann. (1984). "Purging procedures for the Draeger LAR V underwater breathing apparatus". Navy Exp. Diving Unit Res. Report. 5–84. Archived from the original on August 20, 2008.
- Butler, F. K.; E. D. Thalmann. (1984). "Oxygen Toxicity in Closed-Circuit SCUBA Divers". Navy Exp. Diving Unit Res. Report. 11–84. Archived from the original on August 29, 2008.
- Thalmann, E. D. (1985). "Development of a Decompression Algorithm for Constant Oxygen Partial Pressure in Helium Diving". Navy Exp. Diving Unit Res. Report. 1–85.
- Thalmann, E. D. (1985). "Air-N202 Decompression Computer Algorithm Development". Navy Exp. Diving Unit Res. Report. 8–85.
- Thalmann, E. D. (1985). "Repetitive/Multi-Level Dive Procedures for Constant 0.7 ATA Oxygen Partial Pressure in Nitrogen Diving". Navy Exp. Diving Unit Res. Report. 9–85.
- Presswood, C. G.; E. D. Thalmann; M. D. Curley (1986). "Test and evaluation of two prototype model underwater decompression monitors". Navy Exp. Diving Unit Res. Report. 10–86.
- Thalmann, E. D.; R. Schedlich; J.R. Broome; P.E. Barker (1987). "Evaluation of Passive Thermal Protection Systems for Cold Water Diving". (Royal Navy) Institute of Naval Medicine Report. Alverstoke, England. 25–87.
- Weinberg, R. P.; E. D. Thalmann. (1990). "Effects of Hand and Foot Heating on Diver Thermal Balance". Naval Medical Research Institute Report. 90–52. Archived from the original on June 13, 2008.
- Albin, G.; P. Massell; E. D. Thalmann (1990). "Basic Operation and Preliminary Trials of a Detector for Stationary Gas Bubbles". Naval Medical Research Institute Report. 91–39.
- Thorp, J. W.; D.M. Stevens; A.J. Dutka; T.J. Doubt; E.D. Thalmann (1992). "Pyridostigmine Prophylaxis During Warm Water Diving Operations". Navy Medicine. 83 (1): 23–26.
- Survanshi SS, Weathersby PK, Homer LD, Thalmann ED. Design of Dive Trials. In: Lang MA, Vann RD eds: AAUS Repetitive Dive Workshop. Costa Mesa, CA. American Academy of Underwater Scientists, 1992:287-292.
- Weathersby, P. K.; S.S. Survanshi; R.Y. Nishi; E.D. Thalmann (1992). "Statistically based decompression tables VII: Selection and treatment of primary air and N2O2 data". Joint Report: Naval Submarine Medical Research Laboratory and Naval Medical Research Institute. NSMRL 1182 and NMRI 92-85.
- Parker, E. C.; S.S. Survanshi; P.K. Weathersby; E.D. Thalmann (1992). "Statistically Based Decompression Tables VIII: Linear Exponential Kinetics". Naval Medical Research Institute Report. 92–73.
- Ball, R.; J. Himm; L. D. Homer; E. D. Thalmann (1994). "A Model of Bubble Evolution During Decompression Based on a Monte Carlo Simulation of Inert Gas Diffusion". Naval Medical Research Institute Report. 94–36.
- Parker, E. C.; S.S. Survanshi; E.D. Thalmann; P.K. Weathersby (1996). "Statistically based decompression tables IX: probabilistic models of the role of oxygen in human decompression sickness". Naval Medical Research Institute Report. 96–05.
- Survanshi, S. S.; P. K. Weathersby; E. D. Thalmann (1996). "Statistically based decompression tables X: Real-time decompression algorithm using a probabilistic model". Naval Medical Research Institute Report. 96–06.
- Thalmann, E. D.; P. C. Kelleher; S. S. Survanshi; E. C. Parker; P. K. Weathersby (1999). "Statistically Based Decompression Tables XI: Manned Validation of the LE Probabilistic Model for Air and Nitrogen-Oxygen Diving". Naval Medical Research Institute Report. 99–01.
- Survanshi, S. S.; E. C. Parker; E. D. Thalmann; P. K. Weathersby (1997). "Statistically based decompression tables XII: Volume I. Repetitive decompression tables for air and constant 0.7 ata PO2 in N2 using a probabilistic model". Naval Medical Research Institute Report. 97–36.
- Survanshi, S. S.; E. C. Parker; E. D. Thalmann; P. K. Weathersby (1997). "Statistically based decompression tables XII: Volume II. Repetitive dive tables: Air". Naval Medical Research Institute Report. 97–36.
- Survanshi, S. S.; E. C. Parker; E. D. Thalmann; P. K. Weathersby (1997). "Statistically based decompression tables XII: Volume III. Exceptional exposure tables: Air". Naval Medical Research Institute Report. 97–36.
- Survanshi, S. S.; E. C. Parker; E. D. Thalmann; P. K. Weathersby (1997). "Statistically based decompression tables XII: Volume IV. Repetitive dive tables: 0.7 ATA PO2 in N2". Naval Medical Research Institute Report. 97–36.
- Survanshi, S. S.; E. C. Parker; E. D. Thalmann; P. K. Weathersby (1997). "Statistically based decompression tables XII: Volume V. Exceptional exposure tables: 0.7 ATA PO2 in N2". Naval Medical Research Institute Report. 97–36.
- Gerth, W. A.; E. D. Thalmann. (1998). "Vascular Effects of Underwater Low Frequency Sound in Immersed Individuals". Naval Submarine Medical Research Laboratory Report.
- Latson, G. W.; E. T. Flynn; W. A. Gerth; E. D. Thalmann (2000). "Accelerated Decompression Using Oxygen for Submarine Rescue - Summary Report and Operational Guidance". Navy Exp. Diving Unit Res. Report. 11–00.
- Hamilton, R. W. Jr.; E. D. Thalmann; D. J. Temple (2002). "Multi-Day Air Saturation at 20 and 22 FSW With Direct Ascent: Data Report on Project 92-09". Naval Medical Research Institute Report Report. 02–01.
- Hamilton, R. W. Jr.; E. D. Thalmann; D. J. Temple (2002). "Surface Decompression Diving: Data Report on Protocol 90-02". Naval Medical Research Institute Report Report. ADA455075.
- Thalmann, E. D. (2003). "Suitability of the USN MK15(VVAL18) Decompression Algorithm for Air Diving". Navy Exp. Diving Unit Res. Report. 03–12.

=== Book chapters ===
- Vann, R.D; E.D. Thalmann (1993). "Decompression Modeling and Physiology". In Bennett, P.B.; Elliott, D.H. (eds.). The Physiology and Medicine of Diving and Compressed Air Work (Fourth ed.). London: Bailliere Tindall. OCLC 2000230.
- Thalmann, E.D., editor of Chapter 8: "Diving Medicine", in: U.S. Navy Diving Manual, Vol 1. 1984, 1993 revisions. Archived from the original on May 2, 2008.
- Invited Reviewer for: "Treatment of decompression sickness", Chapter 13. In: Edmonds, C.; Lowry, C.; Pennefather, J. (1992). Diving and Subaquatic Medicine (Third ed.). Oxford: Butterworth-Heinemann. OCLC 24009565.
- Thalmann, E.D. (1996). "Gas Physiology in Diving: Decompression". In Fregley, M.J.; C.M. Batteis (eds.). Handbook of Physiology, Section 4: Environmental Physiology Volume II. New York: The American Physiological Society. Oxford University Press. pp. 1012–1015.
- Thalmann, E.D. (1997). "Diving Hazards". In Langley, R.L; McLymore, R.L.; Meggs, W.J.; Roberson, G.T. (eds.). Safety and Health in Agriculture, Forestry, and Fisheries. Rockville, MD: Government Institutes. OCLC 35750471.
