= Beaudoin =

Beaudoin is a surname of French origin related to Baldwin. Notable people with the surname include:

- Alexandre Beaudoin (born 1978), Canadian forensic fingerprint scientist
- Andre Beaudoin (fl. 1988–2008), Canadian Paralympian athlete
- Cole Beaudoin (born 2006), Canadian ice hockey player
- Denise Beaudoin (born 1949), Quebec politician, member of the National Assembly of Quebec 2003–07
- Doug Beaudoin (born 1954), American football player
- Édouard Beaudoin (fl. 1900–1908), French Olympic archer
- Eric Beaudoin (born 1980), Canadian ice hockey player
- Gérald Beaudoin (1929–2008), Canadian lawyer and senator
- Gilles Beaudoin (1919–2007), Quebec politician, Mayor of Trois-Rivières
- Kenneth Lawrence Beaudoin (c. 1913–1995), American poet
- Laurent Beaudoin (born 1938), Quebec businessman, CEO of Bombardier Inc.
- Leila Beaudoin (born 1996), Canadian boxer
- Léonel Beaudoin (1924–2021), Canadian politician, member of the Canadian House of Commons 1968–79
- Louise Beaudoin (born 1945), Quebec politician, member of the National Assembly of Quebec
- Louis-René Beaudoin (1912–1970), Canadian politician, Speaker of the Canadian House of Commons 1953–1957
- Mathieu Beaudoin (born 1984), Canadian ice hockey player
- Mathieu Beaudoin (Canadian football) (born 1974), Canadian football player
- Michelle Beaudoin (born 1975), Canadian actress from Alberta
- Paul E. Beaudoin (born 1960), American composer, music theorist, and author
- Raymond O. Beaudoin (1918–1945), American army officer; recipient of the Medal of Honor for his actions in World War II
  - Eponym of the ship USNS Lt. Raymond O. Beaudoin (T-AP-189)
- Richard Beaudoin (composer) (born 1975), American composer
- Sean Beaudoin (contemporary), American author
- Serge Beaudoin (born 1952), Canadian ice hockey player
- Steven Beaudoin, American politician
- Yves Beaudoin (born 1965), Canadian ice hockey player

== See also ==
- Beaudin
- Beaudouin
- Baudoin
- Baudouin (disambiguation)
- Bowdoin (disambiguation)
