= Vintage scuba =

Early model scuba equipment and the ongoing activity of diving with it

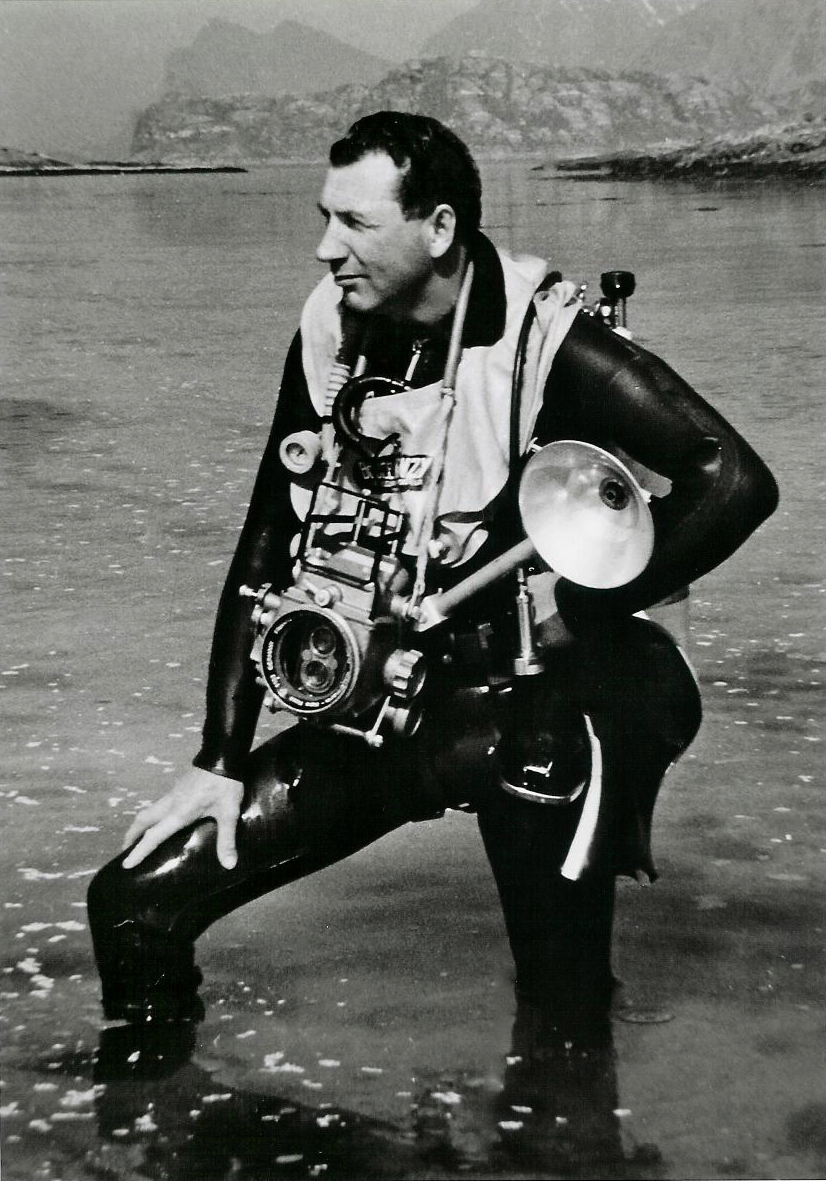
State of the art in the late 1960s - Underwater photographer Odd Henrik Johnsen

Vintage scuba is scuba equipment dating from 1975 and earlier, and the practice of diving using such equipment.

== Twin hose regulators ==
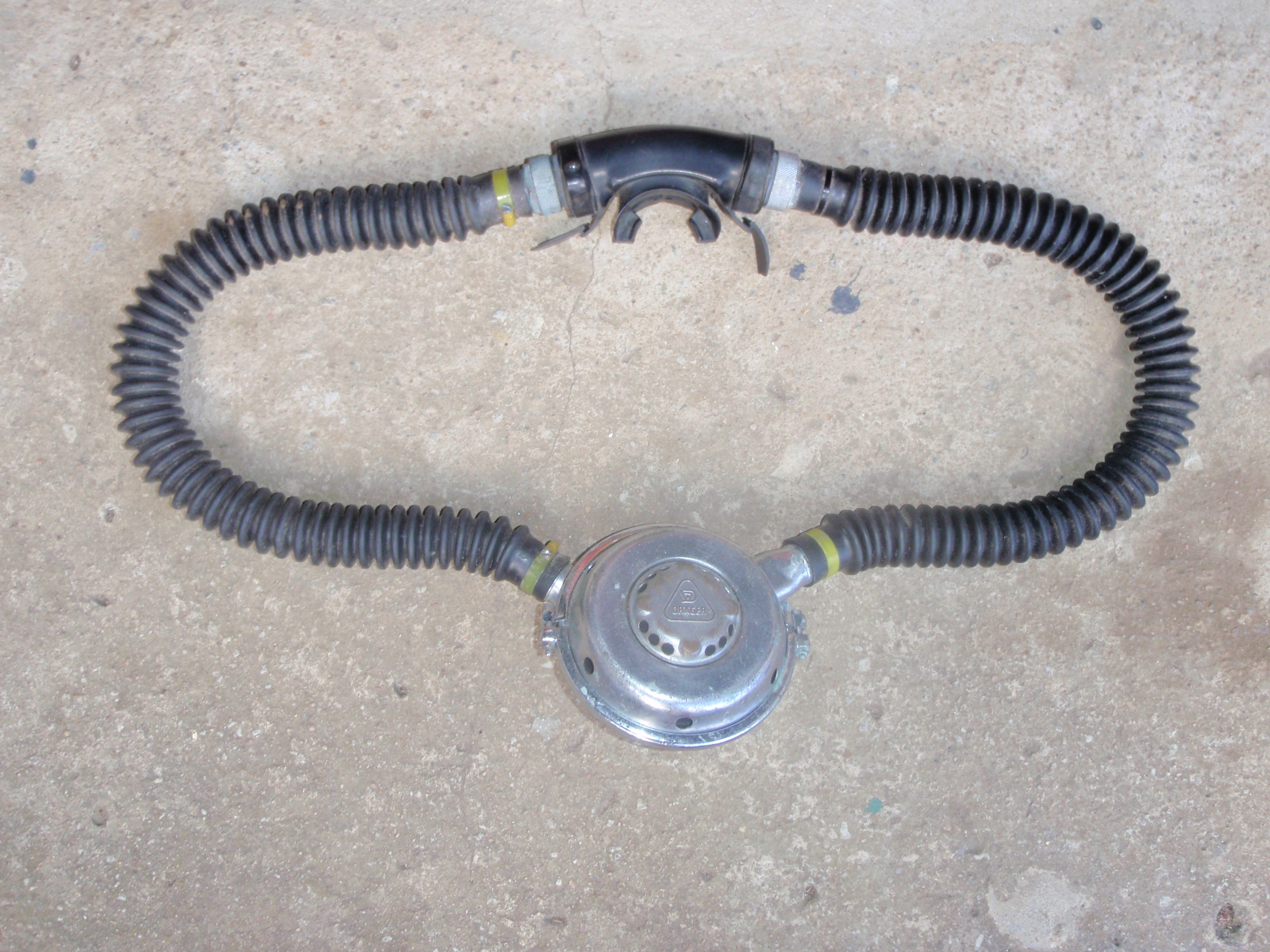
Draeger twin hose two stage demand regulator

The most striking and well recognized example of vintage scuba gear is the twin-hose or double hose regulator, a popular style of regulator in the early years of scuba diving, since Jacques-Yves Cousteau and Emile Gagnan pioneered the first such design, the C45 Scaphandre Autonome, which was marketed in the USA (along with a tank and harness) as the Aqua-Lung. The durability of the regulators from the 1950s through the early 1970s lent them to easily be refurbished and restored. Since 1997, Vintage Scuba Supply has been supplying parts for original regulators. Vintage Double Hose supplies parts for a modern version of the double-hose scuba regulator. That regulator is composed of modern polymers and specialty metals. It allows for additional scuba equipment to be attached, such as a submersible pressure gauge, which overcomes one of the problems of the original double hose regulators which were not able to incorporate accessories.

== Regulator features of historical interest ==
=== First stage with integral reserve valve ===
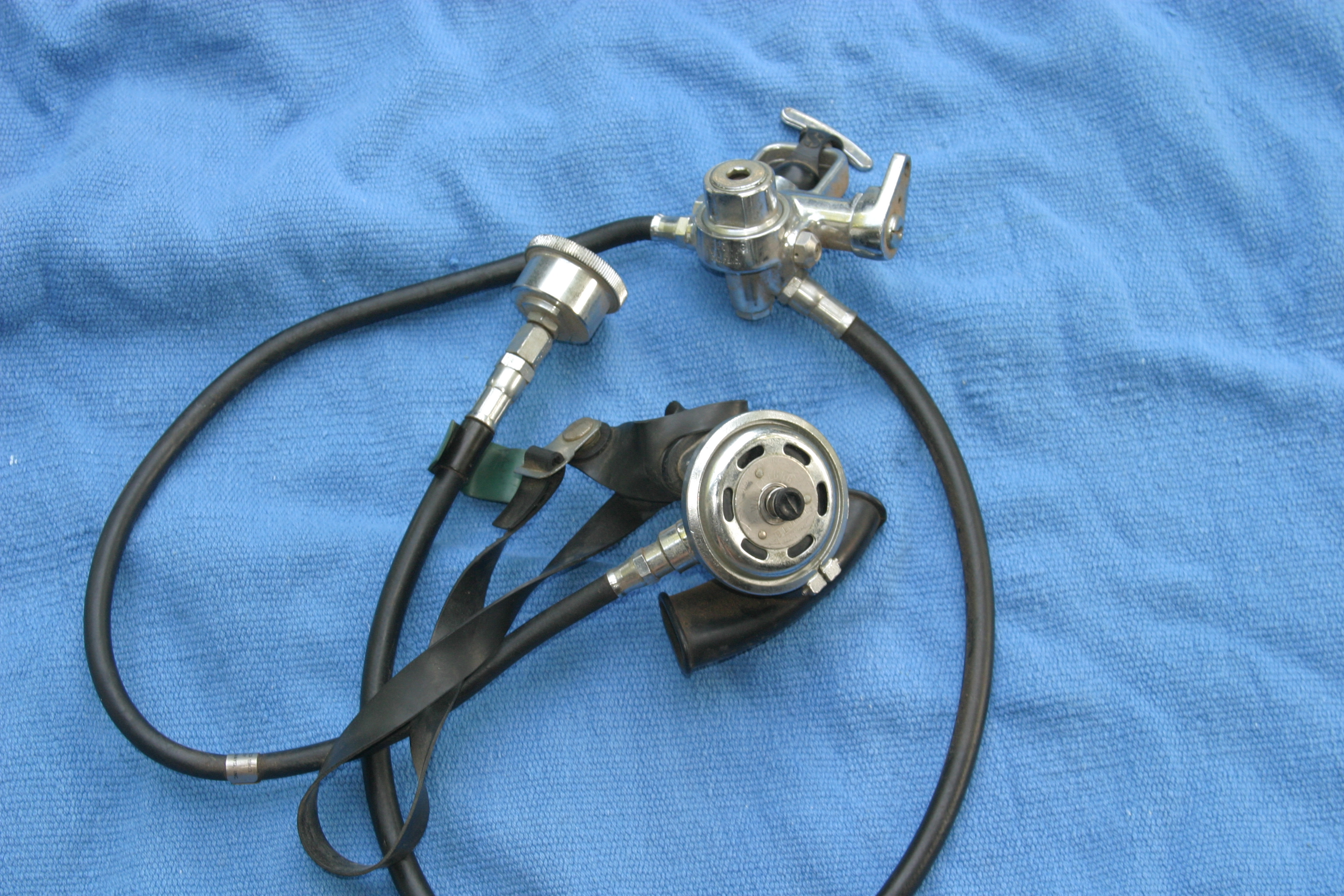
1960 Sportsways Waterlung "Navy unit" with integrated reserve valve and lever on the first stage

A number of manufacturers produced integral reserve regulators in 1961 and 1962 with reasonable market acceptance. These regulators provided a lever operated mechanical reserve valve that restricted air flow when the pressure was below 500 psi. Alerted to having a low gas supply the diver would pull a rod to open the reserve valve and surface using the remaining gas. This feature provides reserve capacity on cylinders with plain valves. With this arrangement the reserve rod must also be transferred to the cylinder in use.

=== Twin-hose with regulator on chest ===
In this unusual configuration the cylinder(s) are on the diver's back and are connected by a low pressure hose to a twin-hose regulator on the diver's chest.

- A design described in Practical Mechanics magazine in January 1955 as a home-made aqualung with a first-stage on the cylinder top leading through a low pressure hose to a large round second-stage (a converted Calor Gas regulator) on the diver's chest connected to the diver's mouthpiece by a twin-hose loop.
- An early Australian design called a Lawson Lung was made in Sydney by a group of enthusiasts who were unable to get Aqua-lungs due to limited supply, based on the patented Costeau-Gagnan design, but modified to use available components. The regulators were made and tested at John Lawson's jewellery factory in Greenwich, North Sydney. Only 12 were made, and had to be mounted on the chest to achieve acceptable performance.

=== Full-face mask regulator ===
There have been some cases of a single-hose regulator final stage built into a full-face mask so that the mask's big front window, in conjunction with a flexible rubber seal joining it to its frame, functioned as a large and sensitive regulator diaphragm:

- Several versions of the Le Prieur breathing set. Yves Le Prieur first patented with Maurice Fernez, in 1926, a breathing apparatus using a mouthpiece, but as of 1933 he removed the mouthpiece and included a circular full-face mask in all following patents (like 1937, 1946 or 1947).
- In 1934 René Commeinhes, from Alsace (France), adapted a Rouquayrol-Denayrouze apparatus for the use of firefighters. With new 1937 and 1942 patents (GC37 and GC42), his son Georges adapted this invention to underwater breathing by means of a single hose connected to a full-face mask.
- Captain Trevor Hampton invented independently from Le Prieur a similar regulator-mask in the 1950s and submitted it for patent. The Royal Navy requisitioned the patent, but found no use for it and eventually released it. By then, the technology had advanced and it was too late to make this regulator-mask in bulk for sale.

== Regulator models of historical interest ==
=== Ohgushi's Peerless Respirator ===
Invented in 1916 by Riichi Watanabi and the blacksmith Kinzo Ohgushi, and used with either surface supplied air or a 150 bar steel scuba cylinder holding 1000 litres free air, the valve supplied air to a mask over the diver's nose and eyes and the demand valve was operated by the diver's teeth. Gas flow rate was proportional to bite force. The breathing apparatus was used successfully for fishing and salvage work and by the military Japanese Underwater Unit until the end of the Pacific War.

=== Demone regulator ===
These unusual regulators were designed by Robert J. Dempster and made at his factory in Illinois, USA, from 1961 to 1965. The Demone Mark I and Demone Mark II are both two-stage regulators. The second-stage looks like the mouthpiece of a twin-hose regulator but has a small diaphragm on the front. The second-stage valve is inside the mouthpiece tube. The exhaled air goes into a corrugated coaxial exhaust hose which surrounds the low pressure hose and discharges about 60% of the way back to the first-stage to keep the bubbles away from the diver's face. Near the mouthpiece is a one-way valve to let outside water into the exhaust hose to avoid free flow if the diaphragm (at the mouth) is below the open end of the exhaust hose. The Mark I has hoses only on one side, and the Mark II has twinned low pressure hoses, each with its own coaxial exhaust hose and second stage, one assembly on each side of the diver's head, but with both second stages in the same mouthpiece housing and operated by the same diaphragm. This version has a small second stage.

=== Normalair breathing apparatus ===
This system is unusual in that it used a single stage single hose demand valve in a full-face mask. The high pressure supply hose routes over the shoulder, but from an inverted cylinder, which allows the user to easily reach the valve.

=== Dräger Delfin II (Barakuda) ===
For a few years in the mid-1950s, Dräger made the Dräger Delfin II (their first scuba regulator - it was marketed as the Barakuda (now IAC) in the USA): this was a single stage single hose "pendulum"" regulator with only one ambient pressure (corrugated) hose: the exhaled air went back down the hose to the cylinder mounted regulator and was released to outside through a one-way valve inside the casing. The end of the flexible tube was connected to the mouthpiece by a short quarter-circle of hard tube. The two way hose would have caused dead space similar to a rebreather with a pendulum system.

=== Porpoise regulator ===
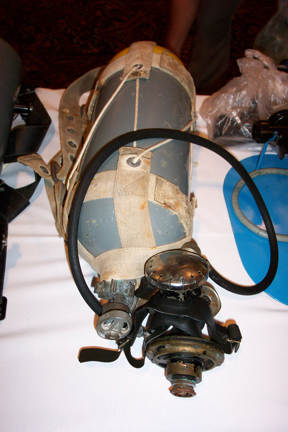
An example of the Porpoise CA-1, the world's first commercially available, single hose SCUBA unit

The first single-hose open-circuit scuba made by Ted Eldred in Melbourne, Australia. It was designed in 1948 to avoid the Cousteau-Gagnan aqua-lung patent, and to get rid of air supply restrictions that affected early Cousteau-Gagnan-type aqua-lungs. Commercial production started in 1952. The Royal Australian Navy adopted it, and it popular with Australian recreational scuba divers. The model CA-1 was used on one cylinder with its valve at the bottom, strapped directly to the back with rucksack-type straps without backpack plate or buoyancy aid, with a single-hose regulator-mouthpiece which could be strapped in. The tank was inverted so that the diver could reach the regulator mounted reserve handle. The head strap was intended to keep the demand valve from falling well below the diver, if dropped from the mouth. The high-pressure regulator screwed into the outlet of the cylinder valve. Versions were made for the Australian Navy until 1976, and the last one known to be sold to the public was sold in that year. About 12,000 Porpoise units of all models were produced, of which about 50 still exist. Only a few of the early models are known today, the rarest being the CA-2, made for use with two tanks.

== "Tadpoles" ==
In the early years of scuba diving in Britain, "tadpole" was a nickname for a type of diving gear that had two meanings:

- A type of ex-Royal Air Force pilot's oxygen cylinder that had a tapering end, and was often used as an aqualung cylinder in the 1960s and earlier.
- An early make of Siebe Gorman aqualung with a twin-hose regulator and two air cylinders. Both ends were hemispherical, and were 13 inches long and 7 inches in diameter. Siebe Gorman's trade catalog describing this set showed two sorts of diver wearing this set, both with weighted boots, and with no mention of free-swimming. A 1950s Royal Navy diving manual also said that the Aqua-Lung was only for (negative buoyancy) bottom-walking diving. Siebe Gorman either had no idea about sport diving then, or else was against sport diving, and expected aqualungs to be used for light commercial diving. Later most recreational divers were free-swimming scuba divers, with bottom-walkers virtually restricted to those doing commercial work.

== Historical rebreathers ==
- Porpoise oxygen rebreather

== Reserve valves ==
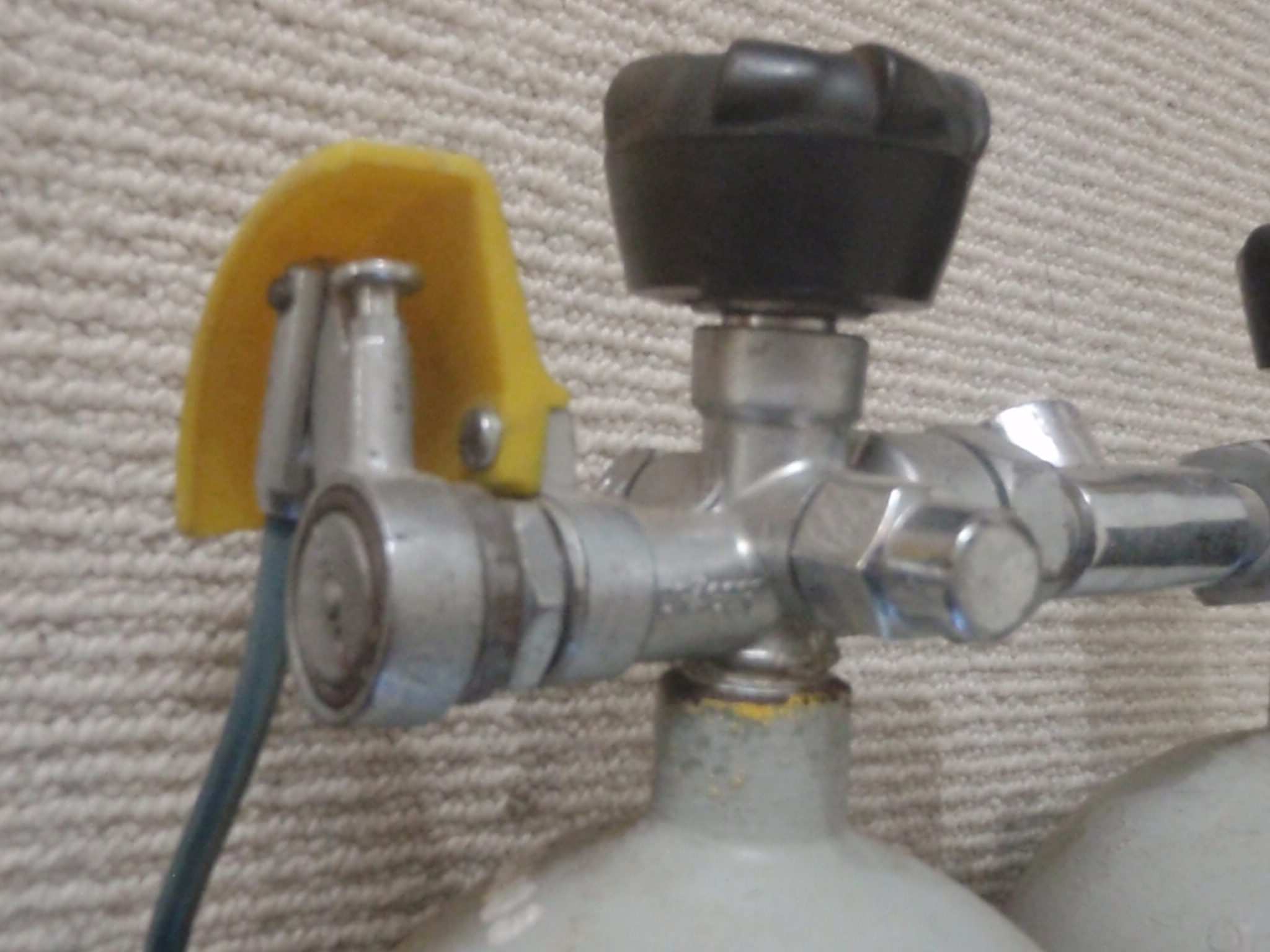
Detail of the Draeger reserve valve

== Exotic and experimental equipment ==
=== Propulsive power from the stored energy ===
The concept of a diving regulator where the energy released as the air expands from cylinder pressure to the surrounding pressure as the diver inhales, is used to power a propeller has been patented, but no product ever appeared on the market.

=== Twin-hose, home-made regulators ===
In 1956 and for some years afterwards in Britain, factory-made aqualungs were very expensive, and many aqualungs of this type were made by sport divers in diving clubs' workshops, using miscellaneous industrial and war-surplus parts. One necessary raw material was a Calor Gas bottled butane gas regulator, whose 1950s version was like an aqualung regulator's second stage but passed gas all the time because its diaphragm was spring-loaded; conversion included changing the spring and making several big holes in the wet-side casing. The cylinder was often an ex-RAF pilot's oxygen cylinder; some of these cylinders were called tadpoles from their shape.

=== Practical Mechanics design ===
A design was described in Practical Mechanics magazine in January 1955, for a home-made aqualung with a first-stage on the cylinder top leading through a low pressure hose to a converted Calor Gas regulator on the diver's chest connected to the diver's mouthpiece by a twin-hose loop.

== Gallery ==
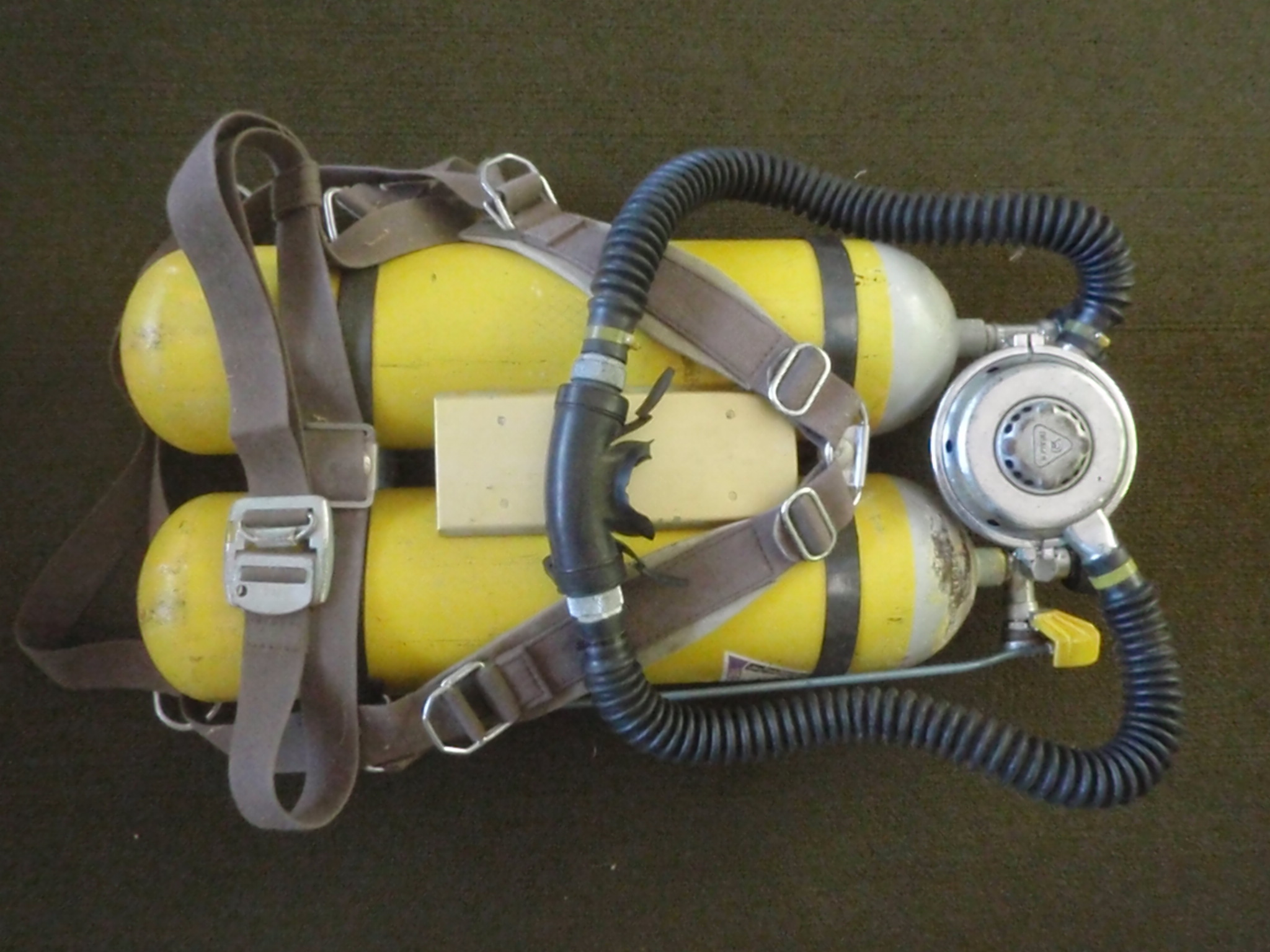
The complete Draeger twin 7 litre 200 bar scuba set with twin hose regulator

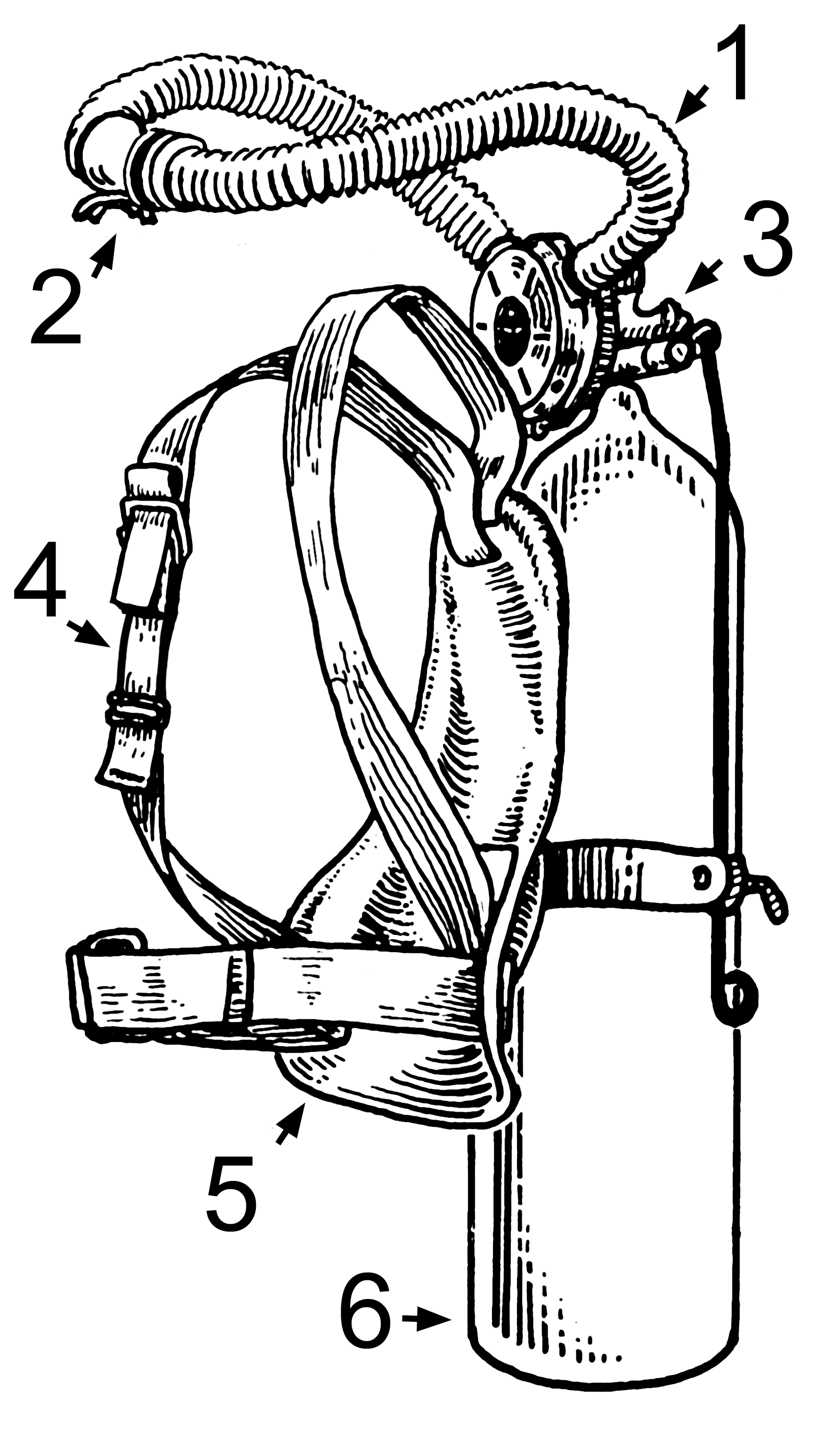
An early Aqualung set.

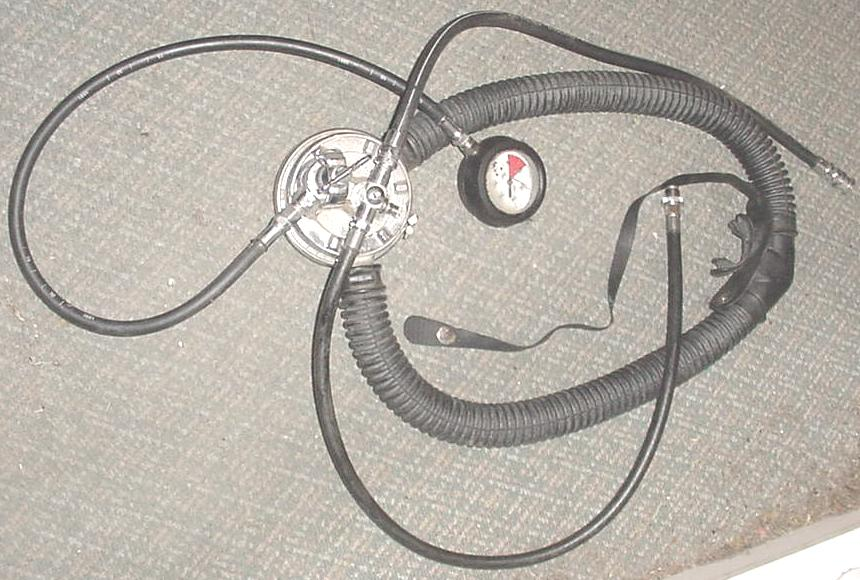
The Nemrod Snark III silver regulator is typical of the older twin-hose type.

== Diving suits ==
=== Do-it-yourself magazine designs ===
- In February and March 1959, the British magazine Newnes Practical Mechanics published a two-part article entitled "Make yourself a diving suit" and offering details of "a rubber-proofed suit for aqualung divers and a wet suit for aqualung and skin diving". These home-made suits could be built for a fraction of the price of their cheapest commercial counterparts.
- In August 1959, the Italian magazine Sistema "a" published an article entitled "Tuta impermeabile per subacquei" (Waterproof suit for divers) with similar illustrations for home construction.
