= Heinke (diving equipment manufacturer) =

British manufacturer of diving equipment

- Industry: Diving equipment
- Founded: 1844; 182 years ago
- Founder: Charles Edwin Heinke
- Defunct: 1961
- Fate: Incorporated into Siebe Gorman
- Headquarters: London, England, United Kingdom
- Products: Aqualungs, diving helmets, dry suits, wetsuits diving masks, swimming fins, snorkel tubes

Heinke was a series of companies that made diving equipment in London, run by members of a Heinke family.

== Timeline ==
=== Family background ===
Gotthilf Frederick Heinke was born in Meseritz, Prussia in 1786. He arrived in London in 1809 and worked initially as a victualler to build up capital. He married Sarah Smith, who bore him three sons and two daughters. The sons were John William Heinke (born 1816), Charles Edwin Heinke (born 1818), and Gotthilf Henry Heinke (born 1820). John married Louisa Margaret Leathart in 1840

=== Ironmongery ===
In 1818, Gotthilf Frederick Heinke opened an ironmongery shop business in London and, in 1819, he got a workshop at 103 Great Portland Street in London. (Note: Around 1858, the addresses in Great Portland Street were renumbered and 103 became 79) Gotthilf Frederick opened a second premises at 3 Old Jewry, London in 1839.

=== Start of making diving helmets ===
Around 1844, Charles Edwin Heinke made his first diving helmet. Inspired by William F. Saddler, Heinke started using solid brass for diving helmets' breastplates, instead of copper sheet. Heinke's diving helmets had three similarly shaped circular windows. They did not have the outer protective grills as in other helmets; thus they had better visibility for divers, and it was easier to keep the windows clean. Heinke's main competitor was Siebe Gorman who also made diving helmets, and Heinke constantly tried to improve on designs. He introduced an additional exhaust valve on the front side of the breastplate, which is now called the "peppermill" because of the holes in its cover. This exhaust made it possible for the diver to ascend and descend much faster.

In 1845, Charles brought in the "Pearler" helmet, with a square-pattern mould-cast (instead of oval and beaten) copper helmet. He became famous with this style. Their square breastplate made it easier for the diver to bend forwards to look for pearl oysters on the seabed. The idea was later copied by companies such as Siebe after Siebe took over Heinke, and even by Morse Diving in the USA.

- 1852: William Robert Foster and others began running a firm Foster and Williams supplying diving dresses and air hose at 87 Grange Road, Bermondsey, London.
- 1858: Gotthilf Frederick Heinke applied for British citizenship, and was granted it.
- 1863: Some members of the Heinke family (including Frederick William Heinke, son of John William Heinke) started a firm Heinke Brothers, 78-78 Great Portland Street, London, "Submarine Engineers"; that firm lasted until 1867.
- 1869: Charles Edwin Heinke died after being in ill-health for 2–3 years.
- 1870: John William Heinke died from congestion of the liver after an 11-month illness. These two deaths disorganized company business.
- 1871: Frederick William Heinke and one William Griffin Davis AICE formed a new firm Heinke & Davis at 176 Great Portland Street, London. It moved to 2 Brabant Court, Philpot Lane, London. It was bankrupt by January 1879.
- 1871: Gotthilf Frederick Heinke died.
- 1871: Gotthilf Henry Heinke became a sleeping partner in the business and took on a partner William Foster to manage the business; they started a new business C.E.Heinke & Co, Submarine Engineers.
- 1880: Frederick William Heinke was forced to seek work in North America, but died of a fever in 1883 in Tecomabaca, Oaxaca, Mexico.
- 1884: Gotthilf Henry Heinke retired for ill health, and sold his company to William Foster and Robert Fox (his brother in law) who had also become involved in the business, but continued to live on the upper floor of 79 Great Portland Street till his death in 1899.

=== 20th century ===
- 1902: Robert Fox died. Foster and Williams was merged into C.E.Heinke & Co, Submarine Engineers.
- 1904: The lease on Great Portland Street expired. Production was moved to Foster and Williams's premises.
- 1905: The company acquired an additional 10,000 square feet (930 m^{2}) of work area.
- 1905: All Heinke helmets made until 1905 had the butterfly style wingnuts; after that regular wingnuts were used.
- 1922: C.E.Heinke & Co, Submarine Engineers became a limited company C.E.Heinke & Co Ltd, Submarine Engineers, making a good living from standard diving equipment.

=== WWII and after ===
- WWII blitz: Many company records were lost.
- 1950: After this date, the firm's fortunes declined, as with Siebe Gorman.

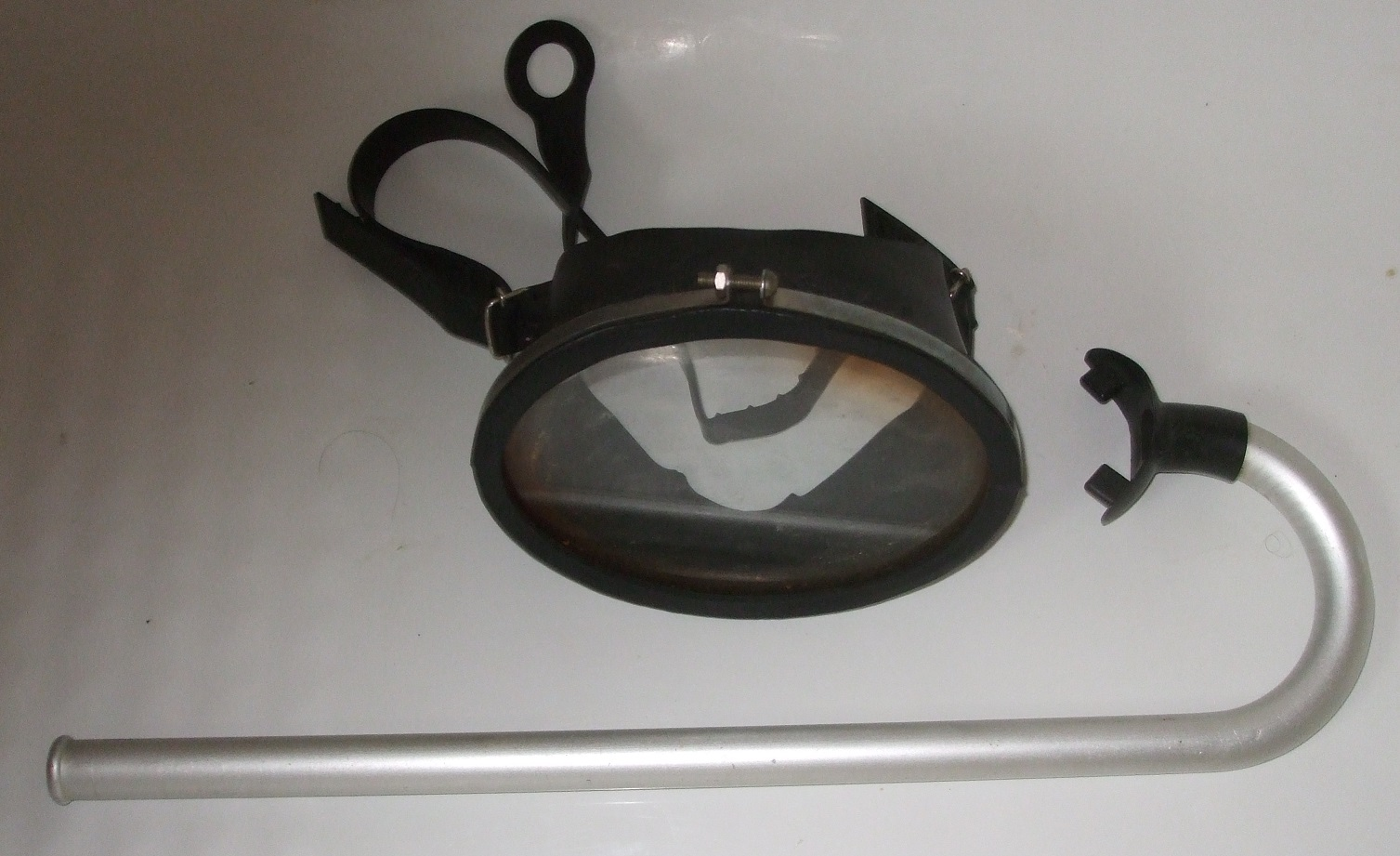
1950s Heinke Hans Hass diving mask and snorkel tube

- Mid to late 1950s: the firm starts making "Heinke-Lung" aqualungs, Delta dry suits, Dolphin and Falla wetsuits, Hans Hass diving masks, swimming fins and snorkel tubes.
- 1958: Heinke donated the Heinke Trophy to the British Sub-Aqua Club (BSAC). This trophy is awarded annually to the BSAC branch judged to have done the most to further the interests of its own members and of the BSAC.
- 1961: The firm was incorporated into Siebe Gorman. The last Heinke diving helmet went out of production in 1961. A few helmets were given the tag of "Siebe-Heinke", but eventually the name Heinke completely disappeared.
- 1967-1968: Siebe Gorman stops using the tradename 'Siebe Heinke'.

Unlike Siebe Gorman, who had only one series of serial numbers for their diving helmets, except for the last productions (which were meant most probably for the Russian Navy), Heinke used many series of serial numbers for them.
