= Louis de Corlieu =

French naval officer and inventor of the swimfin

Louis Marie de Corlieu (born 23 November 1888 in Bourges; died 19 October 1967 in Paris, was a French naval officer and inventor of the swimfin.

== Military service ==
He served as Capitaine de corvette (lieutenant commander) in the French navy in the First World War. In 1925 he left the navy to study techniques for survival at sea.

== Invention of the swimfin ==
After working as a hydrographer in the Belgian Congo from 1928 to 1933, he developed swimfins in 1933, patented them in Paris, and registered them in seven other countries. De Corlieu demonstrated his first prototype of a modern swimfin in front of an audience of officers which included Yves Le Prieur who invented an underwater breathing apparatus in 1926 to 1934. The combination of de Corlieu's fins with le Prieur's breathing apparatus in 1935 was a significant development towards the free-swimming scuba diver. In 1939, de Corlieu finally started mass production of his fins, which until then he had made in his apartment in Paris. In the same year, the American Owen P. Churchill bought a license from Corlieu to produce the fins in the United States, and began to market them 6 months later. They were adopted by the US Navy in 1940 for their combat swimmers, who used them during the Normandy landing and in other operations. In 1945, he invented a more flexible model, which was copied and used for underwater hunting. After the end of the Second World War, these fins and the open circuit underwater breathing apparatus (Aqua Lung) helped develop the scuba diving popularized by Philippe Tailliez and Jacques-Yves Cousteau. De Corlieu was constantly involved in litigation to assert his rights as the inventor and pursue all the companies that copied his invention and sold their products without paying royalties.

The book Le Premier Delphinus Humain (The First Human Dolphin), based on the archives of the Corlieu family and of the French Navy, tells its story. On 9 June 2018 a commemorative plaque was unveiled in the city of Saint-Jean-de-Luz, in memory of a demonstration crossing the bay of Luz in front of French naval observers, on 10 June 1933, during which de Corlieu swam for 6 hours in water at 12°C, traversing 8 km. The French Navy declined to adopt the "swimming and rescue propellants", as they were named at the time.

Louis de Corlieu was inducted to the International Scuba Diving Hall of Fame as an early pioneer of diving.
