= Beaudin =

Beaudin is a surname. Notable people with the surname include:

- Évelyne Beaudin (born 1988), Canadian politician
- Jean Beaudin (1939–2019), Canadian film director and screenwriter
- Josée Beaudin (born 1961), Canadian politician
- Nicolas Beaudin (born 1999), Canadian ice hockey defender
- Norm Beaudin (born 1941), Canadian ice hockey forward

== See also ==
- Beaudoin
