= Beuchat =

French manufacturer of underwater diving equipment

Beuchat International
- Company type: Private
- Industry: wholesale trade (business-to-business) of other household goods
- Founded: 1934; 92 years ago
- Founder: Georges Beuchat
- Headquarters: Marseille, France
- Products: Scuba diving Spearfishing; Freediving; Snorkeling
- Brands: Pêche-Sport, Tarzan
- Website: Beuchat-diving.com

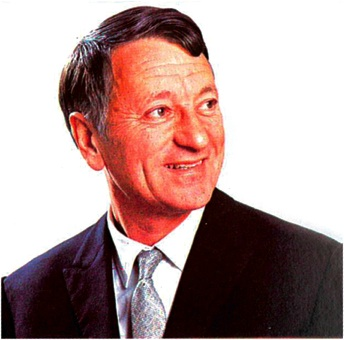
Georges Beuchat in 1980

Beuchat International, better known as Beuchat, is a company that designs, manufactures and markets underwater equipment. It was established in 1934 in Marseille, France, by Georges Beuchat, who descended from a Swiss watchmaking family.

Georges Beuchat was an underwater pioneer who co-founded the French Underwater Federation in 1948. During its 75-year history, the company has deployed several different brand names, among them: "Pêche Sport", "Tarzan", "Beuchat", "Beuchat Sub" and "Beuchat International".

Georges Beuchat sold the company in 1982 to the Alvarez de Toledo family. The firm is now owned by the Margnat family, who took over in 2002. Beuchat is an international company. From the outset, Georges Beuchat extended his operations beyond the borders of France, selling his products worldwide. In the 1970s, he created the Beuchat swordfish logo, which can still be found on every product.

== Business ==
Beuchat currently has 3 core ranges:

- Scuba diving: recreational diving, professional diving and military diving,
- Spearfishing and freediving,
- Snorkeling

== Chronology ==
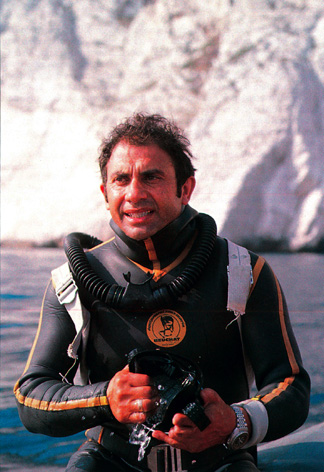
Albert Falco in Tarzan wetsuit

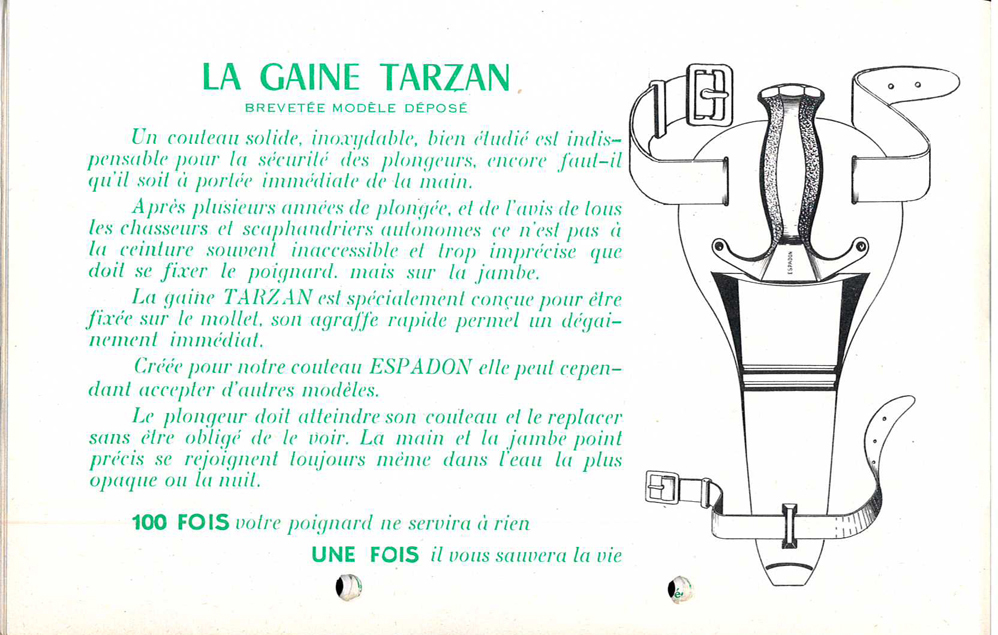
Tarzan calf sheath for diving knife

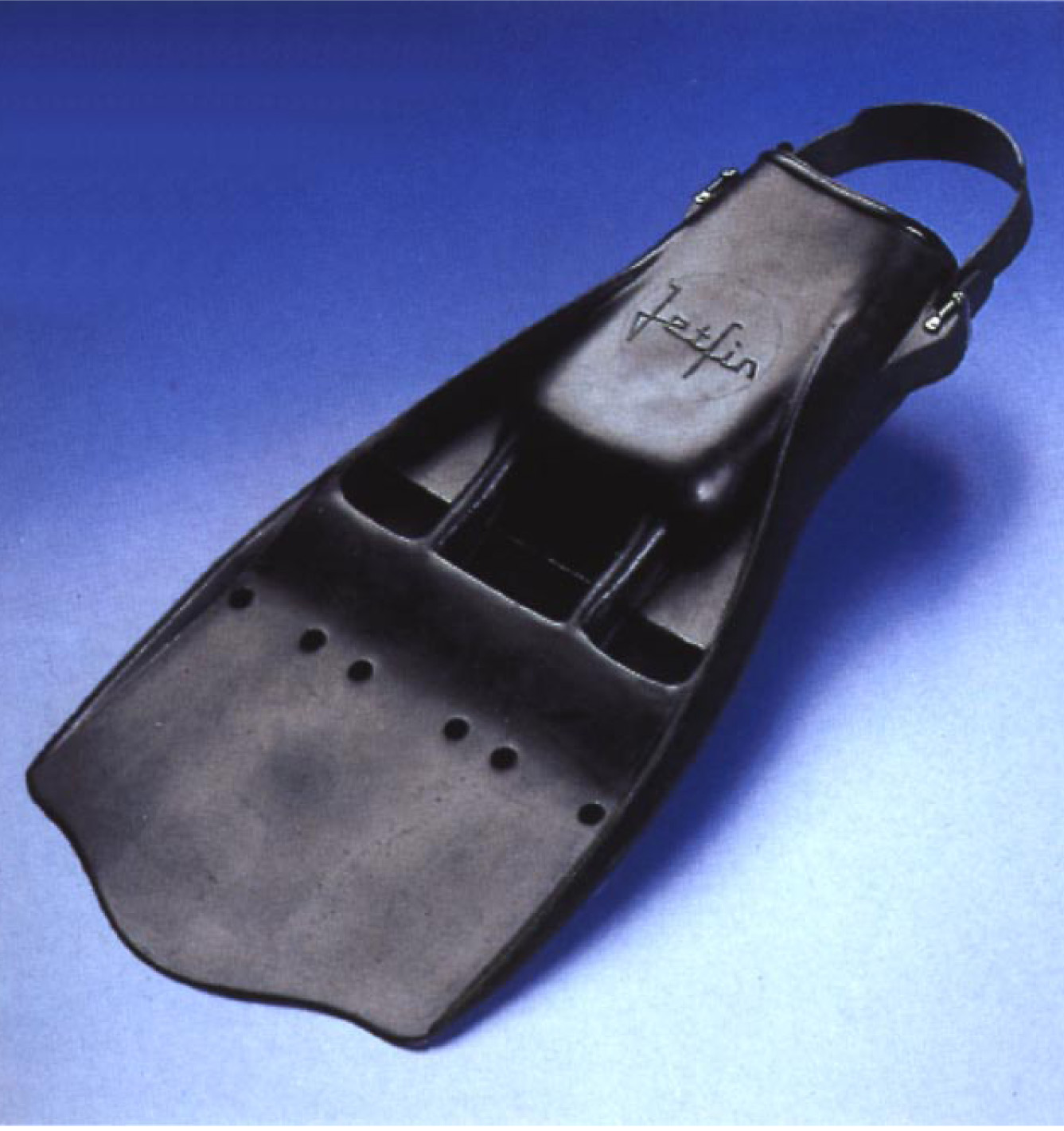
Adjustable open-heel Jetfins

- 1934: Company founded in Marseille.
- 1947: Tarzan Speargun
- 1948: Surface Buoy
- 1950: Tarzan camera housing
- 1950: Tarzan calf sheath for diving knife.
- 1953: 1st Isothermic wetsuit.
- 1954: Split strap for diving mask.
- 1958: Compensator (single-window mask).
- 1959: Tarzan fin grips (3-way straps securing closed-heel fins on feet)
- 1960: Espadon Record fins with blades featuring parallel longitudinal ribs
- 1961: Export Award. Club subaquatique toulousain catalogue of Tarzan-Espadon equipment.
- 1963: Tarzan wetsuit
- 1964: Jetfins (1st vented fins. 100,000 units sold in the first few years). Souplair regulator release.
- Mid-1960s: Pêche Sport catalogue.
- Late 1960s: Beuchat & Co. catalogue.
- 1975: Marlin speargun
- 1978: Atmos regulator
- 1985: Lyfty ruff buoy
- 1986: Aladin computer distribution
- 1990: Cavalero purchasing
- 1993: Oceane buoy
- 1998: CX1, 1st French diving computer (Comex Algorithm, French Labor Ministry certified)
- 2001: Mundial Spearfishing fins
- 2007: Focea Comfort II wetsuit. Power Jet fins.
- 2008: BCD Masterlift Voyager
- 2009: VR 200 Evolution regulator. 75th brand anniversary. Anniversary wetsuit limited edition release.
- 2010: Marlin Revolution speargun - roller gun

== Spearfishing ==
Ever since the company was established, Beuchat has manufactured spearfishing equipment, enabling spearfishers such as Pedro Carbonell, Sylvain Pioch, Pierre Roy, Ghislain Guillou and Vladimir Dokuchajev to gain numerous national and international titles.

== Various ==
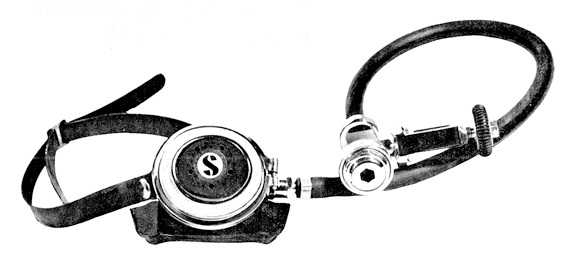
Souplair regulator by Beuchat in 1964

The Scubapro logo: "S" was adapted from the Beuchat "Souplair" regulator.
