= Georges Beuchat =

French inventor, diver and businessman

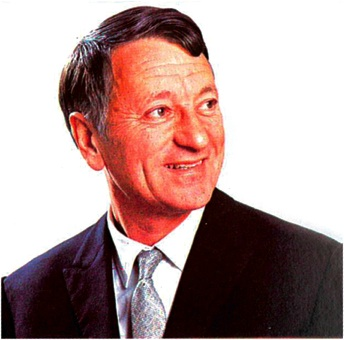
- Georges Beuchat in 1980.
- Born: 11 February 1910; Marseille, France
- Died: 20 October 1991 (aged 81); Cassis, France
- Occupations: Inventor, Diver, Businessman

Georges Beuchat (11 February 1910 – 20 October 1991) was a French inventor, underwater diver, businessman and emblematic pioneer of underwater activities and founder of Beuchat. Throughout his lifetime, Beuchat never ceased developing products which have significantly enhanced underwater activity as we know it today. Many of his inventions and innovations have gone down in history, including the surface buoy in 1948, the first underwater camera housing in 1950, and the first vented fins (the Jetfins in 1964).

== Beuchat inventions ==
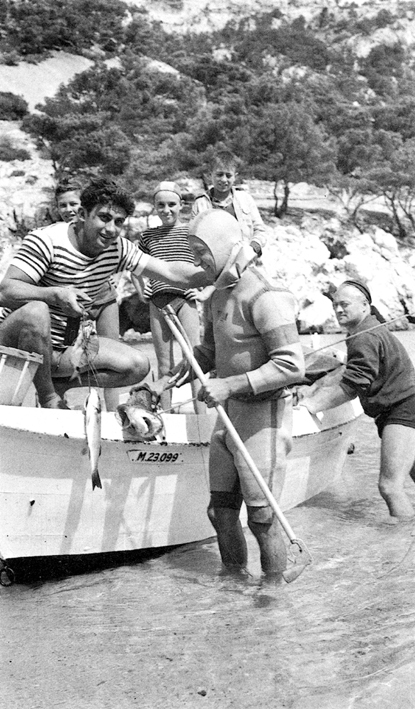
Georges Beuchat wearing the foam-rubber isothermic wetsuit he invented

- 1947: Tarzan Speargun
- 1948: Surface Buoy
- 1950: Tarzan camera housing
- 1950: Tarzan calf sheath for diving knife
- 1953: First isothermic (foam rubber) diving suit
- 1954: Split strap for diving mask.
- 1958: Compensator (single-window mask)
- 1959: Tarzan fin grips (3-way straps securing closed-heel fins on feet)
- 1960: Espadon nervure fins
- 1960: Espadon Record fins with blades featuring parallel longitudinal ribs
- 1963: Tarzan wetsuit
- 1964: Jetfins (1st vented fins. 100,000 units sold in the first few years)
- 1964: Souplair regulator
- 1975: Marlin speargun
- 1978: Atmos regulator

== Distinction ==
- Georges Beuchat received the Exportation Award in 1961.
