= Kenneth Lawrence Beaudoin =

American poet

Kenneth Lawrence Beaudoin (December 12, 1913 – March 19, 1995) was an American anthropologist and poet. As a poet he was an influential member of the Memphis, Tennessee literary community. As an anthropologist he specialized in the folk literature of First Peoples in North America, and published multiple monographs on myths and legends of the Sioux and Blackfoot peoples.

== Life and career ==
Born in Elmira Township, Michigan in 1913, Beaudoin graduated from Memphis State College (1935) before attending Louisiana State University in 1936 and 1937.He pursued further studies at Loyola University New Orleans in 1940, and then in New York City at The New School for Social Research from 1944 through 1946.

As a poet, Beaudoin is best known for inventing the "eye poem," a poetic form that combined words and pictures. Throughout his career, Beaudoin met and corresponded with a wide range of better-known poets, such as William Carlos Williams, E. E. Cummings, Randall Jarrell, and Ezra Pound. Beaudoin also had an important influence as leader of the Memphis literary community, presiding over a literary circle described by Memphis author James Conaway in his memoir Memphis Afternoons.

During the Depression era, Beaudoin lived in New Orleans and he was head of the Louisiana Historical Records Survey from 1936 through 1940. He later ran an art gallery for several years in Greenwich Village, New York.

Beaudoin pioneered the "eye poem" in the 1940s, and one newspaper account of his career states that Beaudoin produced thousands of eye poems over a ten-year period. A folio edition of 6,000 poems was published by Archangel Press in 1947. His work appeared in over 100 publications. Beaudoin also founded the Poetry Society of Tennessee.

Beaudoin served as a kind of father figure to many Memphis writers, and his house on the Mississippi River was the site of his literary salon. Memphis poet and artist Frances Cowden, a member of Beaudoin's circle, later recalled that Inisfree, as he called his home on the river, was a place where local poets would gather to talk about, and read, poetry with Beaudoin: "We would all go down there and read poetry and listen to him talk about poetry. And if you had a big decision you needed to make in your life, you would go and talk to Kenneth about it first because he always gave good advice." Beaudoin was named "Poet Laureate of the River" in 1976 at the Mid-South Festival.

Beaudoin was also known for the "gemstone awards" he would give to poets.

Starting in the 1950s, Beaudoin supported himself as chief clerk in criminal intelligence with the Memphis Police Department. Beaudoin considered the job a source of rich insight into human nature. In a 1981 newspaper interview Beaudoin explained, "My police job kept me close to human beings in tense situations.... From a poet's point of view, it was perhaps the most important job I could have had. When you associate with people on a day-to-day basis, there's nothing exciting about it. You don't even remember it. But when people are under pressure, you can talk to them differently and the experience becomes memorable. Where else could you learn as much about people as at a police station?" Beaudoin retired from his police job in 1980, due to blindness.

Beaudoin was a charter member and officer of the Memphis Archaeological and Geological Society that was formed in 1951. The Society performed and reported on the first house excavation at Chucalissa Indian Village. The Society was heavily involved with early archaeological and geological surveys and excavations in eastern Arkansas, northern Mississippi, northeastern Alabama and western Tennessee.

Beaudoin's papers are housed at the University of Memphis Special Collections Department.

== Sources ==
- First Annual Report, Memphis Archaeological & Geological Society, Founded February 17, 1951.
- Memphis Archaeological & Geological Society, Publication No. 3, Memphis Museum, Memphis Tennessee February 17, 1952.
- Covington, Jimmie (March 26, 1995). "Poet Opened Window to Human Character in Police Job." The Commercial Appeal (Memphis), p. C11.
