= Maurice Fernez =

French inventor and pioneer in underwater breathing apparatus

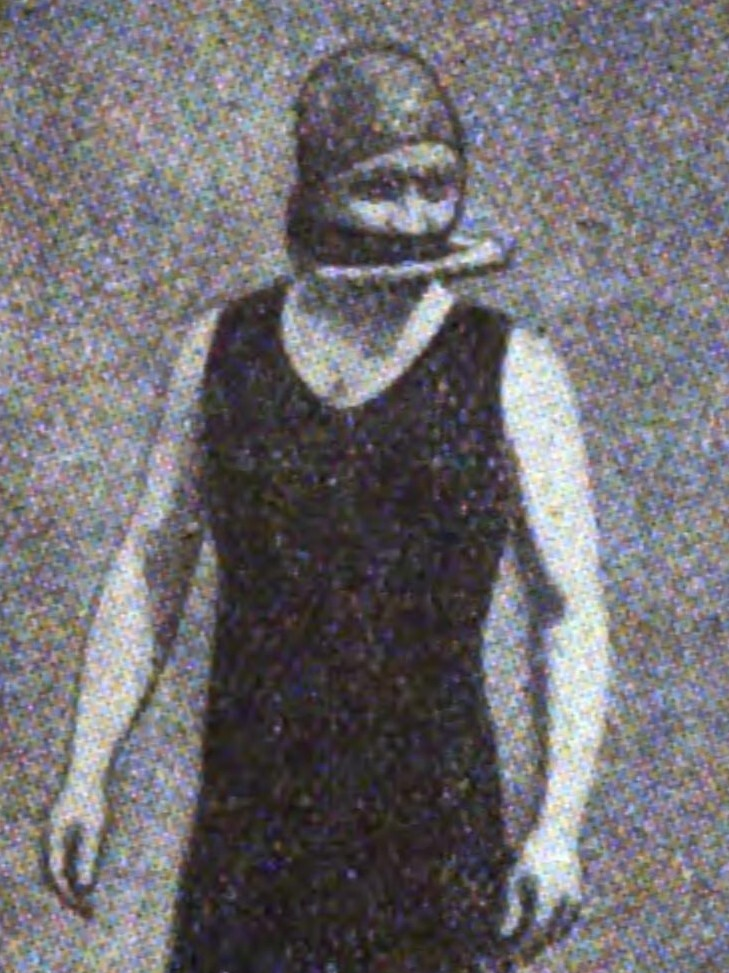
Ferenz in 1912

Maurice Fernez (30 August 1885 – 31 January 1952) was a French inventor and pioneer in the field of underwater breathing apparatus, respirators and gas masks. He was pivotal in the transition of diving from the tethered diving helmet and suit of the nineteenth century to the free diving with self-contained equipment of the twentieth century. All Fernez invented apparatus were surface-supplied but his inventions, especially his mouthpiece equipped with a one-way valve, inspired the scuba diving pioneer Yves le Prieur. He was also a talented businessman who created a company to manufacture and sell the breathing apparatus he invented, and expanded its range of products to include gas masks, respirators and filters.

== Invention of the Fernez Breathing Apparatus ==
After a traumatic accident during childhood play when he was thrown into water and injured his foot, which left him with a lifelong limp, Fernez became fascinated with creating a device which would enable a swimmer to stay under water for a few minutes to help save drowning people. This should be a light and simple device which could be quickly put into action, unlike the heavy traditional equipment of diving suit and massive metal helmet. From 1905 Fernez experimented with devices for breathing underwater.

Fernez's first idea was a rubber balloon connected to the swimmer's mouth with a tube. The idea was that this would provide a reservoir of air which could be breathed in and out. But Fernez quickly realised that this worked for only two or three breaths. His next idea was to use a flexible rubber tube connecting the diver's mouth to an air intake on the surface supported by a float. Fernez registered a patent on this invention on 14 May 1912, which was granted on 22 July 1912. The swimmer's end of the tube had a T-shaped mouthpiece, one side connected to the air hose through a one-way (non-return) valve, the other side to an exhaust with a "duck bill" check valve. Fernez's idea was that the diver's normal inhalation would be sufficient to draw air down the tube through the one-way valve, and his exhalation to expel used air through the exhaust.

Fernez soon found that beyond a depth of one metre, or at most a metre and a half, inhaling air down the tube and exhaling it through the exhaust valve becomes impossible because of the pressure of water compressing the chest. He quickly realised that the air needed to be supplied to the diver under sufficient pressure to balance the pressure of the water at whatever depth the diver was operating. He added a manual Michelin air pump, the type used to inflate car tyres, to pump air down the tube, and also a clamp for the diver's nose to prevent water entry, and goggles to protect the eyes and permit underwater vision. Air was pumped continuously down the tube and flowed out of the exhaust valve of the mouthpiece, causing the pressure in the mouthpiece to be exactly the same as the external water pressure. The diver could breathe in and out from this stream of air without difficulty. This breathing apparatus was called the Fernez model 1.

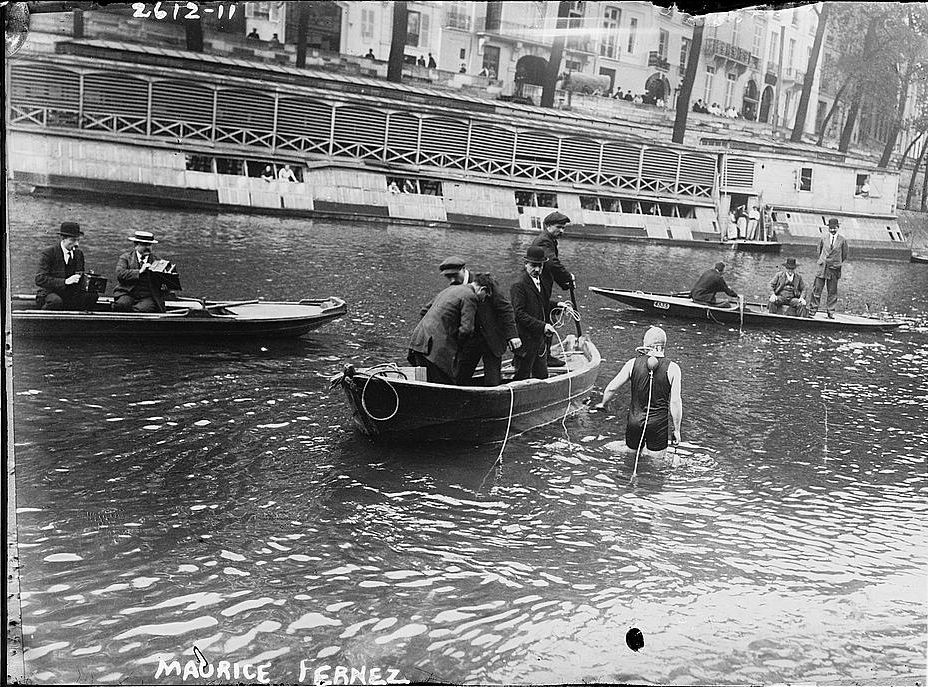
Fernez demonstrating his diving equipment 1912

During the summer of 1912 Fernez tested his equipment by diving 6 metres deep in the river Seine near Alfortville and remaining immersed for 58 minutes, only being forced to the surface by the cold of the water. On 20 August 1912 Fernez demonstrated his equipment to the authorities in Paris by diving six meters deep in the Seine between the bridges of Sully and Marie and remaining under water for periods of 10 and 6 minutes. On 27 October 1912 a scientific test was organised by the French Rescue society in a swimming pool on the Avenue Ledru-Rollin in Paris. A volunteer named Sigismond Bouyer remained under water for 35 minutes and was then examined by Doctor Fremin who confirmed that his respiratory and cardiac rhythms were normal. Questioned by the doctor, Bouyer said that he hadn't felt any discomfort and could stay underwater indefinitely.

In 1920 to achieve greater depths, Fernez made the breathing tube 45 metres long and replaced the car tyre air pump with a more powerful pump operated by two men instead of one, This device is called the Fernez model 2. For shallow depths the diver could wear Fernez patented goggles, and for greater depths a rubber face mask with two lenses, one in front of each eye. Fernez received a visit from a Greek Trade Mission led by Mr. André Michalacopoulos, Minister of the Economy, to view the new Fernez model 2, and as a result an order was placed to supply sets of the equipment to Greece for use by sea sponge divers.

In 1923 Fernez won a gold medal at the Exposition Pasteur, and his diving equipment was demonstrated to the public in December of that year at the Exposition de Physique et de Télégraphie Sans Fil in Paris by a diver who demonstrated cutting steel underwater with Picard oxyacetylene equipment.

== Collaboration with Yves Le Prieur on Self Contained Underwater Breathing Apparatus ==
In 1925 Fernez demonstrated his apparatus at the Industrial and Technical Exhibition in Paris. The demonstration was observed by Yves Le Prieur. Le Prieur had an idea and asked Fernez to join forces with him to work on a new concept of a breathing apparatus fully autonomous from the surface, with an air tank doing away with the need for the tube connecting the diver to the surface. Fernez accepted the offer enthusiastically.

In 1926 Le Prieur and Fernez introduced their new free-swimming diving gear. Instead of the long tube to the surface, it had an air tank worn on the divers back which supplied a continuous flow of air to the Fernez mouthpiece. The pressure is adjustable by hand through a pressure regulator designed by Le Prieur, and there are two pressure gauges, one for tank pressure and one for output pressure. It is the first practical system of self-immersion which frees the diver from all ties with the surface. This equipment is called the appareil Fernez-Le Prieur ('Fernez-Le Prieur apparatus'). On 6 August 1926 Fernez and Le Prieur put on a public demonstration of the device in the Tourelles' swimming pool (in French, Piscine des Tourelles) in Paris, and it is then approved by the French Navy. In 1933 le Prieur dropped all of the three Fernez patented features used on their co-invention (the goggles, the nose-clip and the one-way valve mouthpiece). He replaced them by a full face mask of his invention, directly air-supplied from the tank, so, as of 1933, all of le Prieur's subsequent patents used the mask and were called by the name of appareil Le Prieur ('Le Prieur apparatus').

== The Fernez Company ==
In 1912 Fernez set up a company to mass-produce his equipment, which was very successful because it was a fraction of the price of a traditional diving suit, and was also simple, compact, lightweight, easily portable and quick to put into operation - a few minutes compared to the half an hour a traditional helmet diver would take to get ready. The set of equipment was contained in a wooden box and weighed 12 kg, and cost 200 francs. It sold to many countries, and Fernez became so well known that he once received a letter addressed simply to "Monsieur Fernez - France".

In 1912 the equipment won Fernez a Premier Grand Prix of small inventors and manufacturers at the Concours Lépine. In 1913 he received the gold medal at the Universal Exhibition in Ghent (Belgium) and the silver medal of the Society for the Encouragement of Domestic Industry. Fernez expanded his range of equipment to include respirators for use in mines, and during the first World War (WW1) produced gas masks for men, horses and dogs.

Other equipment produced by Fernez's company included: the Fernez model 3 breathing apparatus, for use in underground pipes and galleries (such as mines or sewers) where the tube is extended to 80 metres, charcoal filters against foul gases such as ammonia and sulfur, an oxygen rebreathing apparatus with soda to absorb CO_{2}, a medical oxygen inhaler, and an air circulation helmet for the fire brigade.

In 1930 the Fernez company registered a new patent for filter cartridges for gas and dust. In 1931 the company won a silver medal from the National Office for Scientific Research for creations and innovations. Production of diving equipment was slowly abandoned in favour of respiratory filtering equipment for hazardous and toxic environments.

At the age of 67 years Maurice Fernez died of a heart attack on 31 January 1952 in Alfortville. The family business was carried on by his son André, and then after André died on 1 January, 1966, it was carried on by Mrs. Alice Fernez, who was the daughter of the inventor, until 1997. In 1997 it became part of the Bacou group, which was taken over by Sperian Protection. Since 15 September 2010, Sperian Protection is part of Honeywell.

== See also ==
- Timeline of diving technology – Chronological list of notable events in the history of underwater diving equipment
- Jacques Cousteau – French oceanographer and author (1910–1997)
