= Bowdoin =

Bowdoin may refer to:

- Bowdoin, Maine, a town
- Bowdoin College, a college in Brunswick, Maine
- Bowdoin Street, a street in Boston, Massachusetts
  - Bowdoin (MBTA station)
- Bowdoin National Wildlife Refuge, a wildlife refuge in Montana
- Bowdoin (Arctic schooner)
- Bowdoin prize
- Bowdoin Fjord, Greenland
- Bowdoin Glacier, Greenland

== People with the name ==
- James Bowdoin (1726–1790), American political and intellectual leader
- James Bowdoin III (1752–1811), American philanthropist and statesman
- Jim Bowdoin (1904–1969), American football player
- Temple Bowdoin (1863–1914), American businessman
- Bowdoin B. Crowninshield (1867–1948), American naval architect
