= Joseph-Martin Cabirol =

French engineer and designer of diving equipment

Joseph-Martin Cabirol (28 March 1799 – 15 December 1874) was a French inventor who patented a new model of standard diving dress in Paris in 1855, based on Augustus Siebe's designs.

Cabirol was born in Narbonne on March 28, 1799. He was the son of Jean Guillaume Cabirol, a trader, and Marie Lescot. On April 1, 1829, in Bordeaux, he married Anne Caroline Royère, the daughter of a pension master in Béziers. He died 168 Marsal street in Paris, 9th district, on December 15, 1874, at the age of 75.

Cabirol's suit was made out of rubberized canvas. The helmet, for the first time, included a hand-controlled exhaust valve that the diver used to evacuate his exhaled air. The valve included a one-way valve which stops water from entering the helmet. Until 1855 diving helmets were equipped with only three circular windows (front, left and right sides). Cabirol's helmet introduced a fourth window, in the upper front part of the helmet, which gave the diver an upward view. Having been presented to the Exposition Universelle in Paris, Cabirol's diving dress won the silver medal. The original diving dress and helmet are now preserved at the Conservatoire National des Arts et Métiers in Paris.

His gravestone has a carving of a goat on it, as 'cabirol' is Occitanian for "goat".
