= Morse Diving =

American manufacturer of diving equipment

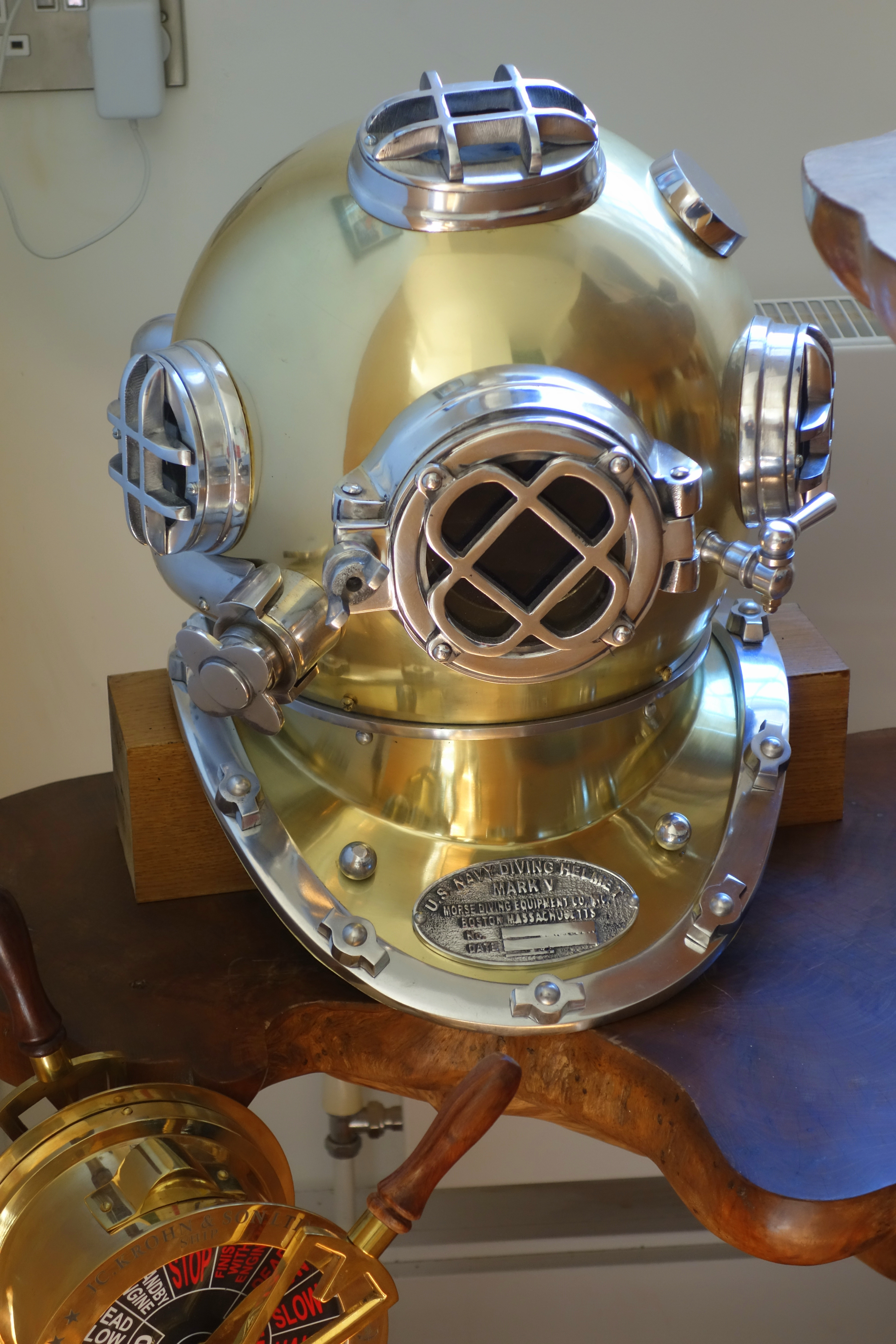
US Navy Diving Helmet, Mark V, Morse Diving Equipment Co.

Morse Diving was an American manufacturer of diving equipment founded in 1837. Morse filed for bankruptcy and Diving Equipment and Supply Company (DESCO) acquired its assets in 2016.

DESCO also continues to use their original DESCO equipment to produce Mark V helmets under their name as well.

== Company history ==
In 1837, Fletcher & Morse Co. opened at the corner of Water and Congress Streets in Boston MA. The company began as a manufacturer of brass goods for the marine industry. A few years later Mr. Fletcher retired from the firm. In 1864, the company's name was changed to Andrew J. Morse & Son. When the company began making diving helmets is not clear. The earliest company records are for compressor pumps which date back to the Civil War. When Andrew J. Morse died in 1881 his son William F. Morse took over. In 1905, William Morse retired and management of the company was given to his daughter Elizabeth, and her husband Mark A. Lawton. The together they incorporated the company and Inc. was added to the name - Andrew J. Morse & Son Inc. The 1910 Morse catalog lists 221 High Street as the company address. All Morse helmets bearing a tag labeled Andrew J Morse & Son Inc. were manufactured in or after 1905. Morse introduced the second generation commercial Helmet in the mid-1930s. The front door size was increased and the bonnet shell was larger. The Mark V exhaust valve replaced the rear head butt exhaust valve. Morse also introduced the #15 Shallow Water Diving Helmet and #15 air pump.

Andrew J. Morse's heirs sold the company in 1939 to the Farrell family (owners of McKee Pile Diving Company), who continued to operate the company in Boston. In 1940, the name of the company changed again to the Morse Diving Equipment Company. In 1970, they moved the operation to Rockland, MA, 20 miles south of Boston. In 1978, Ken Downey was hired by the company as a machinist and in 1998, Ken and his wife Donna Downey purchased the company and once again, the company name was changed.

In 2014 Morse was sold to Mr. Watson Roby Holland and shortly thereafter the company suspended manufacturing operations. Mr. Holland contacted DESCO Corporation to explore having them construct helmets for Morse, as the ability of the firm to produce helmets had deteriorated. After careful consideration Mr. Holland determined independent operation of the company was no longer viable. A legal dispute arose between Downey and Watson that resulted in filing bankruptcy. Morse Diving Incorporated declared bankruptcy in 2015.

DESCO Corporation purchased the assets of Morse Diving in January 2016. DESCO began making Morse diving helmets under the A. J. Morse & Son name.

At the time of its bankruptcy Morse Diving was the 412th oldest business in the United States in continuous operation.
