= Yves Le Prieur =

French naval officer and inventor of a free-flow scuba system

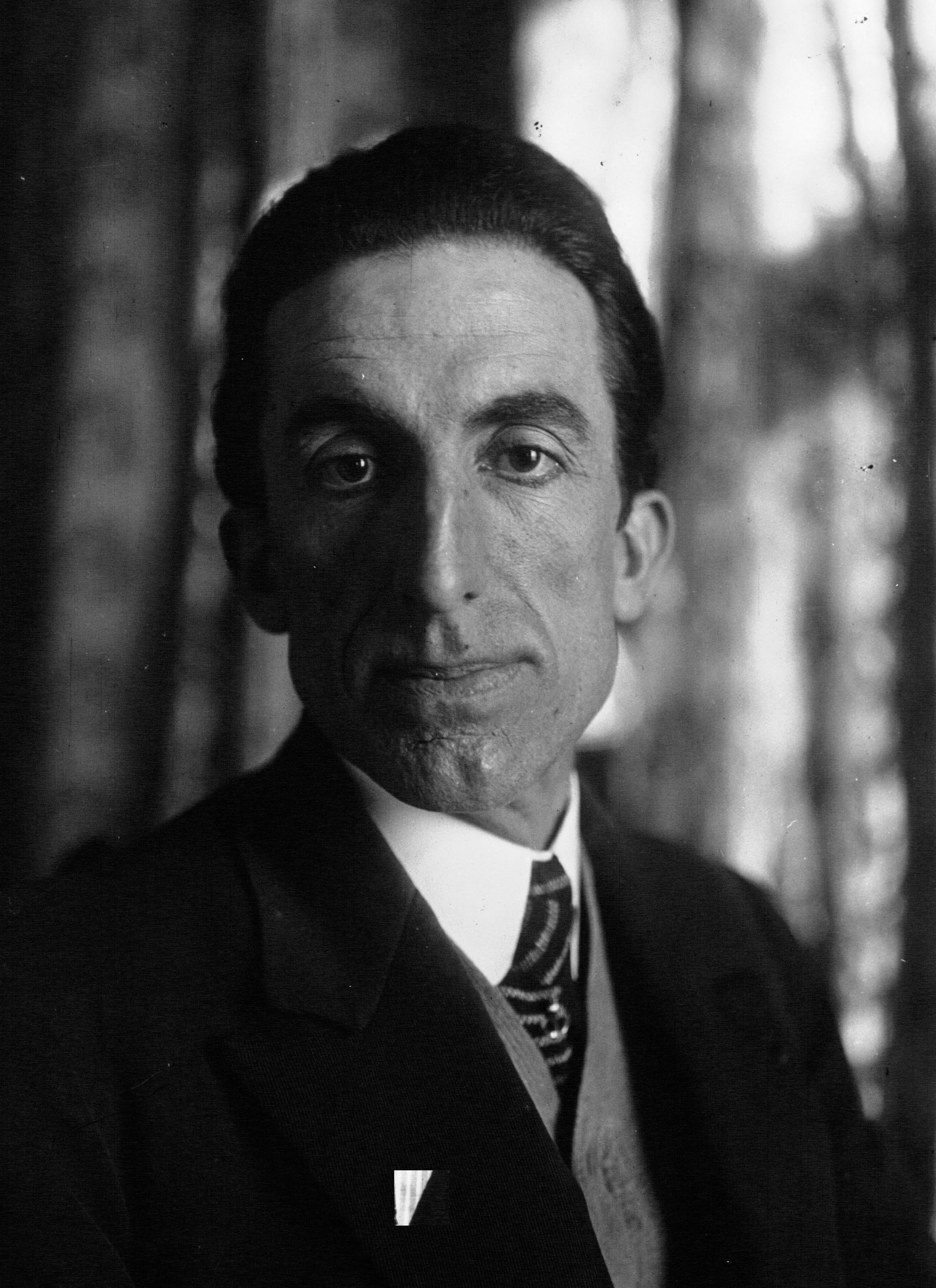
- Born: 23 March 1885; Lorient, France
- Died: June 1, 1963 (aged 78) Nice, France
- Allegiance: France
- Branch: French Navy

Yves Paul Gaston Le Prieur (23 March 1885 – 1 June 1963) was an officer of the French Navy and an inventor.

== Adventures in the Far East ==
Le Prieur followed his father in joining the French navy. As an officer he served in Asia and used traditional deep sea diving equipment. He studied Japanese and became sufficiently proficient to be promoted to military attaché and translator at the French embassy in Tokyo. While there he became the first Frenchman to earn a Black belt in judo, and the first person to take off in a plane, a glider, from Japanese soil in 1909.

The glider, named Le Prieur No. 2 after an earlier No. 1 unmanned prototype, was 7.2 m long, 7.0 m wide, and weighed 35 kg. The frame was made of Japanese bamboo, which was covered with calico. Le Prieur had designed the glider in collaboration with Shirou Aibara, a Lieutenant of the Japanese Navy, and Aikitsu Tanakadate, a professor at Tokyo Imperial University. The first flight took place in December 1909 just to the East of the University of Tokyo at Shinobazu Pond with Le Prieur sitting on the glider's main wing. The first flight covered 200 m at an altitude of 10 m.

== First World War ==
During the First World War he invented the plane-mounted Le Prieur rocket launcher for bringing down observation balloons. This weapon system, which allowed an airplane to fire a single volley of rockets in close succession (the design planned for simultaneous launch, but technical unreliability made it impossible in 1916) was remarkably effective against the German observation balloons, and was only phased out when tracer rounds and incendiary bullets for the on-board machine guns (with similar efficiency and larger ammunition capacity) became widespread among the Allied air forces near the very end of the war.

Le Prieur also patented a number of designs for mechanical lead computing sights for both ship to ship and anti-aircraft guns.

== Invention of open circuit scuba ==
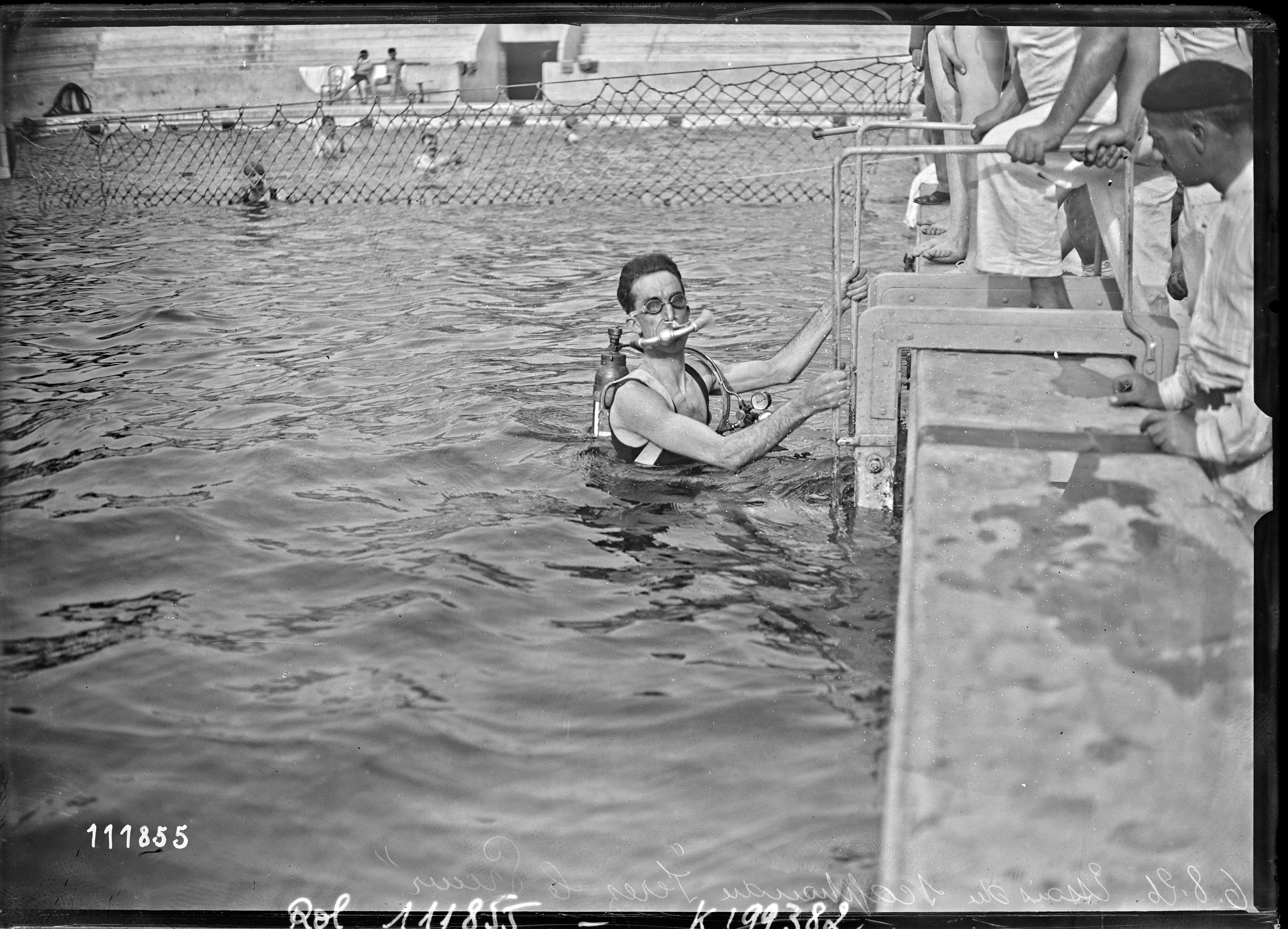
Le Prieur with his breathing apparatus

In 1925 Le Prieur saw a demonstration at the Industrial and Technical Exhibition in Paris of a diver using a breathing apparatus invented by Maurice Fernez. The Fernez breathing apparatus consisted of a simple T-shaped rubber mouthpiece. On one side this was connected to a long tube down which air was pumped from the surface. On the other side of the mouthpiece, excess and exhaled air escaped from a simple rubber "ducks bill" valve. The diver's nose was pinched by a pair of spring clamps ("pince nez") to prevent ingress of water, and his eyes were protected by small goggles with rubber surrounds.

Le Prieur was impressed by the simplicity of the Fernez equipment and the freedom it allowed the diver, and he immediately conceived an idea to make it free of the tube to the surface pump by using Michelin cylinders as the air supply. Michelin cylinders contained three litres of air compressed to 150 kilograms per square centimetre (2,100 psi) supplied by Michelin to garages without air compressors for inflation of car tires. Le Prieur approached Fernez, who cooperated to modify his equipment to Le Prieur's idea, and on 6 August 1926 the "Fernez-Le Prieur" diving apparatus was demonstrated at the swimming pool of Tourelles in Paris. The unit consisted of a cylinder of compressed air carried on the back of the diver, connected to a pressure regulator designed by Le Prieur adjusted manually by the diver, with two gauges, one for tank pressure and one for output (supply) pressure. Air was supplied continually to the mouthpiece and ejected through a short exhaust pipe fitted with a valve as in the Fernez design. For the first time a man could breathe underwater with no connection to the surface at all – Le Prieur had invented the open circuit self-contained underwater breathing apparatus – scuba.

Le Prieur diving equipment. French patent FR 768083, 1934

Fernez's separate goggles didn't allow a dive deeper than ten metres because they were not pressurised, so as the diver went deeper the goggles were squeezed onto his face and eyeballs by the increasing water pressure, a phenomenon known as "mask squeeze". In 1933, Le Prieur replaced the Fernez goggles, noseclip and valve by a full face mask, directly supplied from the air cylinder, which balanced the pressure in the mask with the external water pressure. Le Prieur remarked that the diver could breathe through the mouth or nose, or both, at will, and that it was even possible to speak with another diver by bringing the glass close to their ear, the glass forming a microphone.

In 1934 Le Prieur was granted French patent 768083 for an improved hand-controlled self-contained underwater breathing apparatus with full face mask. The equipment delivered air at constant pressure without a demand regulator. Compressed air was contained in a cylinder carried on the diver's chest in a harness, delivering air to the full face mask at a pressure controlled by a hand-operated regulator. Excess air, and the diver's exhaled breath, escaped by slightly lifting the edges of the mask.

The first diving club was created in France in 1935 by le Prieur and Jean Painleve, it was called the "club des scaphandres et de la vie sous l'eau", the club for divers and life under water.

In 1946, Le Prieur invented a further improvement to his scuba set. Its fullface mask's front plate was loose in its seating and acted as a very big, and therefore very sensitive, diaphragm for a demand regulator: see Diving Regulator.

== See also ==
- Timeline of diving technology – Chronological list of notable events in the history of underwater diving equipment
- Jacques Cousteau – French oceanographer and author (1910–1997)

== Bibliography ==
Jarry, Maud (September 2003). "La bataille des saucisses: les fusées d'Yves Le Prieur en 1916" [The Battle of the Sausages: Yves Le Prieur's Rockets in 1916]. Le Fana de l'Aviation (in French) (406): 28–35. ISSN 0757-4169.
