= Beaudouin =

Beaudouin is a French surname. Notable people with the surname include:

- Patrick Beaudouin (born 1953), French politician
- Michel Beaudouin-Lafon (born 1961), French computer scientist
- Sophie Beaudouin-Hubière (born 1972), French politician

== See also ==
- Beaudouin's snake-eagle, a bird of prey in the family Accipitridae
- Bourg-Beaudouin, a commune in the Eure department in Normandy in northern France
