= Breaststroke =

Swimming stroke

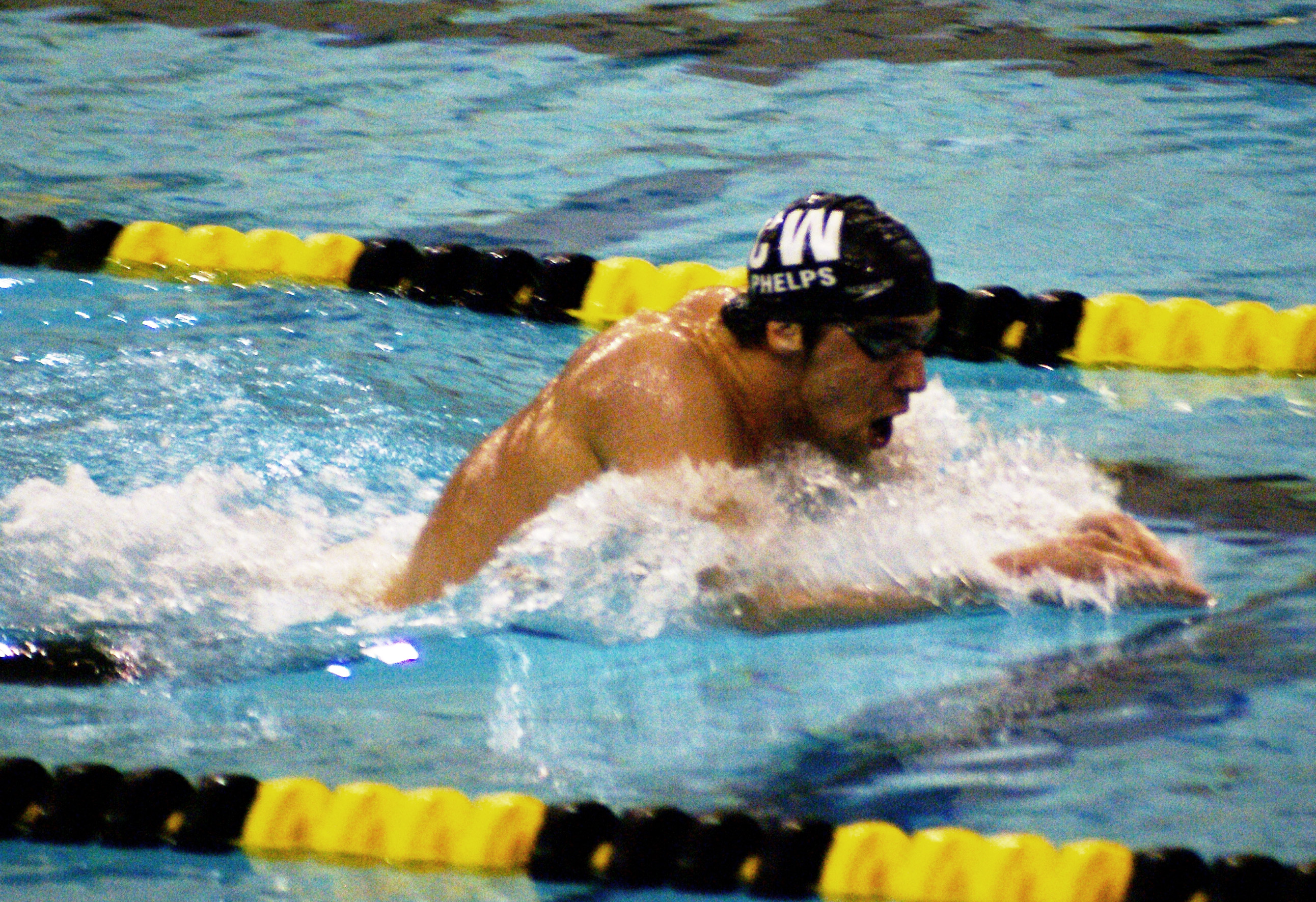
Michael Phelps swimming breaststroke at the 2008 Missouri Grand Prix.

Breaststroke is a swimming style in which the swimmer is on their chest and the torso does not rotate. It is the most popular recreational style due to the swimmer's head being out of the water a large portion of the time, and that it can be swum comfortably at slow speeds. In most swimming classes, beginners learn either the breaststroke or the freestyle (front crawl) first. However, at the competitive level, swimming breaststroke at speed requires endurance and strength comparable to other strokes. Some people refer to breaststroke as the "frog" stroke because the arms and legs move somewhat like a frog swimming in the water. The stroke itself is the slowest of any competitive strokes and is thought to be the oldest of all swimming strokes.

== Speed and ergonomics ==
Breaststroke is the slowest of the four official styles in competitive swimming. The fastest breaststrokers can swim about 1.70 meters (~5.6 feet) per second. It is sometimes the hardest to teach to rising swimmers after butterfly due to the importance of timing and the coordination required to move the legs properly.

In the breaststroke, the swimmer leans on the chest, arms breaking the surface of the water slightly, legs always underwater and the head underwater for the second half of the stroke. The kick is sometimes referred to as a "frog kick" because of the resemblance to the movement of a frog's hind legs; however, when done correctly it is more of a "whip kick" due to the whip-like motion that moves starting at the core down through the legs.

The body is often at a steep angle to the forward movement, which slows down the swimmer more than any other style. Professional breaststrokers use abdominal muscles and hips to add extra power to the kick, although most do not perfect this technique until they are more experienced. This much faster form of breaststroke is referred to as "wave-action" breaststroke and fully incorporates the whip-kick.

A special feature of competitive breaststroke is the underwater pullout. From the streamline position, one uses the arms to pull all the way down past the hips. As the arms are pulling down, one downward dolphin kick is allowed (as of the 2024 season), though still optional; more than one dolphin kick will result in disqualification. This is followed by the recovery of the arms to the streamline position once more with a breaststroke kick. The pullout is also called the "pull down". The pullout at the start and after the turns contributes significantly to the swimming times. Open turns can be easily performed at the walls, but both hands must make contact with the wall. Therefore, one way to improve swimming times is to focus on the start and the turns.

Front view of the breaststroke

Side view of the breaststroke

Top view of the breaststroke

== History ==
The history of breaststroke could go back to the Stone Age, as possibly indicated by images in the Cave of the Swimmers near Wadi Sora in the southwestern part of Egypt near Libya. The leg action of the breaststroke may have originated by imitating the swimming action of frogs. Depictions of a variant of breaststroke are found in Babylonian bas-relief and Assyrian wall drawings.

In 1538, Nicolas Wynman, a German professor of languages and poetry, wrote the first swimming book, Colymbetes. His goal was not to promote exercise, but rather to reduce the dangers of drowning. Nevertheless, the book contained a good, methodical approach to learning breaststroke.

In 1696, the French author and poet Melchisédech Thévenot wrote The Art of Swimming, describing a breaststroke very similar to the modern breaststroke. The book (Benjamin Franklin became one of its readers) popularized this technique.

In 1774, following a series of drownings, English physician John Zehr of the Society for the Recovery of Persons Apparently Drowned began giving public speeches and demonstrations to teach proper swimming technique. He is said to have helped to popularize breaststroke, noting the ease with which it could be learned and swum.

In the pre-Olympic era, competitive swimming in Europe started around 1800, mostly using breaststroke. A watershed event was a swimming competition in 1844 in London, notable for the participation of some Native Americans. While the British raced using breaststroke, the Native Americans swam a variant of the front crawl. The British continued to swim only breaststroke until 1873.

Captain Matthew Webb was the first man to swim the English Channel (between England and France), in 1875. He used breaststroke, swimming 21.26 miles (34.21 km) in 21 hours and 45 minutes.

The 1904 Summer Olympics in St. Louis, Missouri, were the first Olympics to feature a separate breaststroke competition, over a distance of 440 yards (402 m). These games differentiated breaststroke, backstroke, and freestyle.

1928 was the start of the scientific study of swimming by David Armbruster, coach at the University of Iowa, who filmed swimmers from underwater. One breaststroke problem Armbruster researched was that the swimmer was slowed down significantly while bringing the arms forward underwater. In 1934 Armbruster refined a method to bring the arms forward over water in breaststroke. While this "butterfly" technique was difficult, it brought a great improvement in speed. A year later, in 1935, Jack Sieg, a swimmer also from the University of Iowa, developed a technique involving swimming on his side and beating his legs in unison similar to a fish tail, and modified the technique afterward to swim it face down. Armbruster and Sieg combined these techniques into a variant of the breaststroke called butterfly, with the two kicks per cycle being called dolphin fishtail kick. Using this technique, Sieg swam 100 yards (91 m) in 1:00.2. However, even though this technique was much faster than regular breaststroke, the dolphin fishtail kick violated the rules. Butterfly arms with a breaststroke kick were used by a few swimmers in the 1936 Summer Olympics in Berlin for the breaststroke competitions. In 1938, almost every breaststroke swimmer was using this butterfly style, yet this stroke was considered a variant of the breaststroke until 1952, when it was accepted as a separate style with its own set of rules.

In the early 1950s, another modification was developed for breaststroke. Breaking the water surface increases drag, reducing speed; swimming underwater increases speed. This led to a controversy at the 1956 Summer Olympics in Melbourne, when six swimmers were disqualified, as they repeatedly swam long distances underwater. However, a Japanese swimmer, Masaru Furukawa, circumvented the rule by not surfacing at all after the start, but swimming as much of the length underwater as possible before breaking the surface. He swam all but 5 m underwater for the first three 50 m lengths, and also swam half underwater for the last length, winning the gold medal. The adoption of this technique led to many swimmers suffering from oxygen starvation and even to some swimmers passing out during the race, so a new rule was introduced by the FINA, limiting the distance that can be swum underwater after the start and after every turn, and requiring the head to break the surface every cycle.

Since then, the development of breaststroke has gone hand-in-hand with the FINA rules. In about the mid-1960s, the rules changed to prevent the arm stroke from going beyond the hip line, except during the first stroke after the start and after each turn. Before 1987, the head had to be kept above the water surface during the entire stroke. Later on, swimmers were also allowed to break the water with parts of the body other than the head. This led to a variant of the stroke in which the arms are brought together as usual under the body after the pull but then are thrown forward over the water from under the chin until the arms are completely extended. There was a controversy at the 2004 Summer Olympics at Athens after Japan's Kosuke Kitajima won the gold medal in the 100 m breaststroke race over American Brendan Hansen, the world-record-holder. Video from underwater cameras showed Kitajima using a dolphin kick at the start and at some of the turns. Officials claimed that these kicks were not visible from above the surface of the water, so the result stood. In July 2005, FINA announced a change of rules to allow one dolphin kick at the start and at each turn, the new rule took effect on 21 September 2005.

== Techniques ==
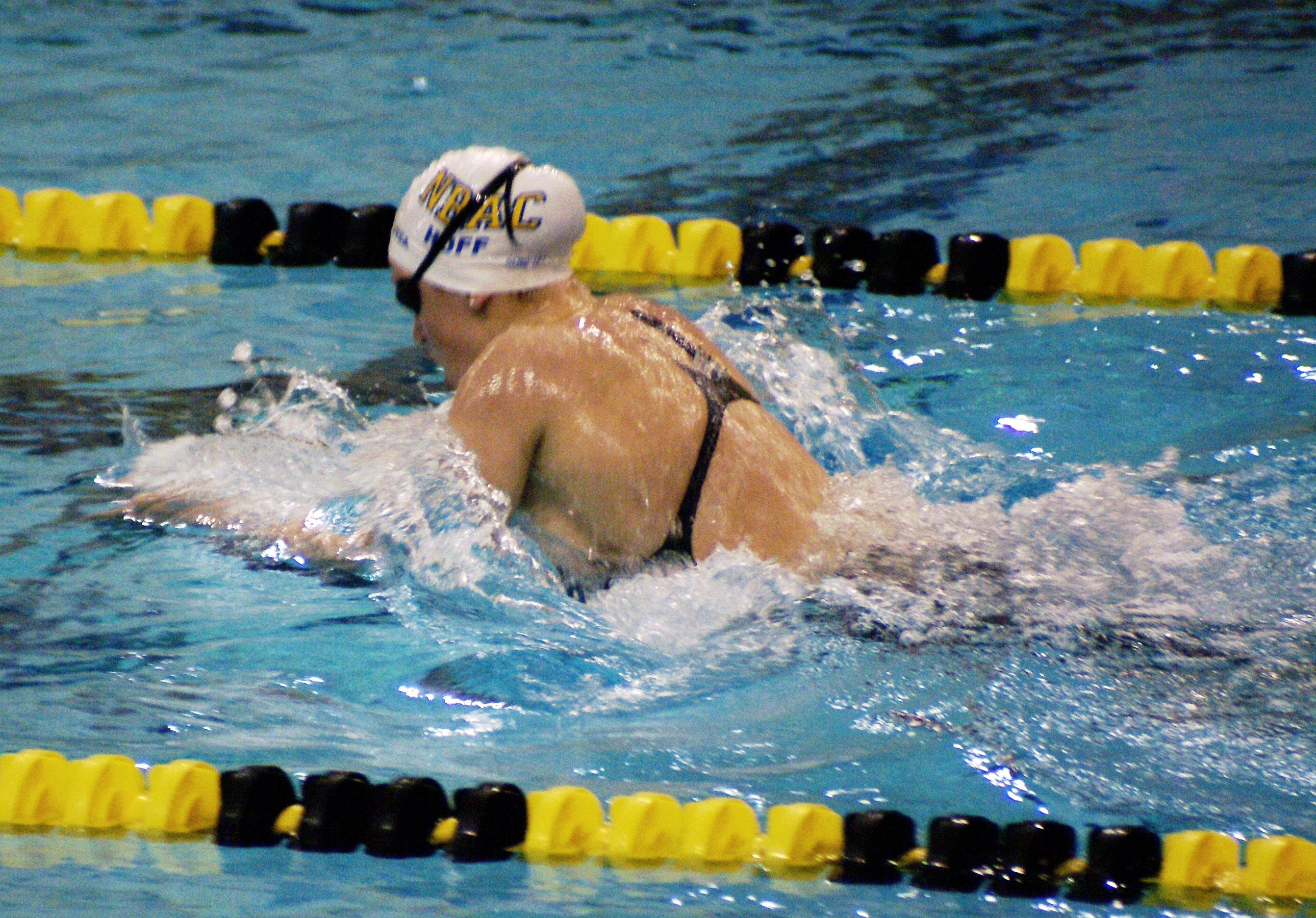
Breaststroke by Katie Hoff at 2008 Missouri Grand Prix.

The breaststroke starts with the fly high butterfly lying in the water face down, arms extended straight forward and legs extended straight to the back.

=== Arm movement ===
There are three steps to the arm movement: outsweep, insweep, and recovery. The movement starts with the outsweep. From the streamline position, the palms turn out and the hands separate to slightly past shoulder width. The outsweep is followed by the insweep, where the hands point down and push the water backwards. The elbows stay in the horizontal plane through the shoulders. The hands push back until approximately the vertical plane through the shoulders. At the end of the insweep the hands come together with facing palms in front of the chest and the elbows are at the side at the body. In the recovery phase, the hands are moved forward again into the initial position under water. The entire arm stroke starts slowly, increases speed to the peak arm movement speed in the insweep phase, and slows down again during recovery. The goal is to produce maximum thrust during the insweep phase, and minimum drag during the recovery phase. Another variant is the underwater pull-down, similar to the push phase of a butterfly stroke. This stroke continues the insweep phase and pushes the hands all the way to the back to the sides of the hip. This greatly increases the push from one stroke, but also makes recovery more difficult. This style is well suited for underwater swimming. However, FINA allows this stroke only for the first stroke after the start and each turn. In late 2005, FINA has also introduced a new rule which permits a single downward kick after the push off the wall.

As a variant, it is possible to recover the arms over water. This reduces drag, but requires more power. Almost all competitive swimmers use this variant in competition.

=== Leg movement ===
The leg movement, colloquially known as the "frog kick" or "whip kick", consists of two phases: bringing the feet into position for the thrust phase and the insweep phase. From the initial position with the legs stretched out backward, the feet are moved together towards the posterior, while the knees stay together. The knees should not sink too low, as this increases the drag. Then the feet point outward in preparation for the thrust phase. In the thrust phase, the legs are moved elliptically back to the initial position. During this movement, the knees are kept together. The legs move slower while bringing the legs into position for the thrust phase, and move very fast during the thrust phase. Again, the goal is to produce maximum thrust during the insweep phase, and minimise drag during the recovery phase. In the recovery phase the lower leg and the feet are in the wake of the upper leg, and the feet are pointed to the rear. In the thrust phase all three parts create their own wake, and the flat end of the feet acts like a hydrofoil aligned to give maximum forward thrust. The resulting drag coefficient (or more precisely the frontal area) is thus doubled in the thrust phase.

A fit adult creates a wake. Drag due to a wake is Newtonian drag, increasing with the square of the velocity. For example, if the relative speed between the water and the leg is twice as high on the thrust phase than on the recovery phase, the thrust is four times as high as the drag. Assuming the legs are recovered with a relative speed between leg and body which amounts to the same as the relative speed between water and body, the legs must be kicked back with five times the mean velocity of the swimmer. This limits the top speed, with both effects combined together, velocity and frontal area, yield a thrust-to-drag ratio of 8 for the legs.

As a variant, some swimmers move the knees apart during the preparation phase and keep them apart until almost the end of the thrust phase. Moving both knee and foot outwards like a real frog avoids the extreme rotation in the lower leg.

All other variants fail to increase the frontal area, yet swimmers using them still generate some thrust by the velocity variation and do not drown. Another variant of the breaststroke kick is the scissor kick, however, this kick violates the rules of the FINA as it is no longer symmetrical. Swimming teachers put a great effort into steering the students away from the scissor kick. In the scissor kick, one leg moves as described above, but the other leg does not form an elliptical movement but merely an up-down movement similar to the flutter kick of front crawl. Some swimming teachers believe that learning the front crawl first gives a higher risk of an incorrect scissor kick when learning breaststroke afterwards.

Breaststroke can also be swum with the dolphin kick in butterfly, but this also violates the FINA rules. One kick is allowed, however, at the start and at the turn, providing that it is part of the body's natural movement.

Humans have strong muscles in the legs and would need swim fins (like a frog) to bring all their power into the water and stand with the sole of the feet on the water. Rather the leg grabs almost as much water as the foot and a small amount of water is accelerated to high kinetic energy, but not much impulse is transferred. The toes are bent, the feet point 45° outwards, the sole points backwards, to mimic a hydrofoil. While closing in a V shape to the rear a small "lifting" force can be felt. Unlike in the other kicks, the joints are moved into extrema. Before the kick the knee is maximally bent and the upper leg is rotating along its axis to its extreme outer position and the lower leg is twisted to extreme, at the end of the kick the ankles are maximally turned to the inside so that the soles clap together to achieve a nozzle effect like in a jelly fish. Therefore, training involves getting flexible in addition to fitness and precision. The sudden sideways stress on the knees at the kick can lead to uncomfortable noise and feeling for the beginner and to wear for the senior.

=== Breathing ===
The easiest way to breathe during breaststroke is to let the head follow the spine. When the swimmer's elbows have reached the line of his eye and have begun to rise, their head starts to lift. If they use their high elbows as a hinge for the inward sweep of their hands and forearms, they will create the leverage they need to use their abdominal muscles to bring their hips forward. When their hips move forward, their chest, shoulders and upper back will automatically lift up. Breathing is usually done during the beginning of the insweep phase of the arms, and the swimmer breathes in ideally through the mouth. The swimmer breathes out through mouth and nose during the recovery and gliding phase. Breaststroke can be swum faster if submerged completely, but FINA requires the head to break the surface once per cycle except for the first cycle after the start and each turn. Thus, competitive swimmers usually make one underwater pull-out, pushing the hands all the way to the back after the start and each turn.

Recreational swimmers often keep their head above water at all times when they swim breaststroke.

=== Body movement ===
The movement starts in the initial position with the body completely straight. Body movement is coordinated such that the legs are ready for the thrust phase while the arms are halfway through the insweep, and the head is out of the water for breathing. In this position the body has also the largest angle to the horizontal. The arms are recovered during the thrust phase of the legs. After the stroke the body is kept in the initial position for some time to utilize the gliding phase. Depending on the distance and fitness the duration of this gliding phase varies. Usually the gliding phase is shorter during sprints than during long-distance swimming. The gliding phase is also longer during the underwater stroke after the start and each turn. However, the gliding phase is usually the longest phase in one entire cycle of breaststroke.

=== Start ===
Breaststroke uses the regular start for swimming. Some swimmers use a variant called the frog start, where the legs are pulled forward sharply before being extended again quickly during the airborne phase of the start. After the start a gliding phase follows under water, followed by one underwater pulldown and dolphin kick, then one whip kick as the hands are recovered back to a streamline. This is known as the pull-out. The head must break the surface before the arms reach their widest point on the first stroke after the pull-out. The downward butterfly kick was legalized by FINA, WWF and the NCAA in 2005, and remains optional. The downward fly kick is now allowed in MCSL.

=== Turn and finish ===
For competitive swimming it is important that the wall at the end of the lane is always touched by both hands (known as a "Two-Hand Touch") at the same time due to FINA regulations.

The turn is initiated by touching the wall during the gliding or during the recovery phase of the arms, depending on how the wall can be touched faster. After touching the wall, the legs are pulled underneath the body. The body turns sideways while one hand is moved forward (i.e. towards the head) along the side of the body. When the body is almost completely turned, the other hand will be swung straight up through the air such that both hands meet at the front at the same time. At that time the body should also be almost in the horizontal and partially or totally submerged. After the body is completely submerged, the body is pushed off the wall with both legs. Doing this under water will reduce the drag. After a gliding phase, an underwater pull-out is done, followed by another gliding phase and then regular swimming. The head must break the surface during the second stroke.

As a variant, some swimmers experiment with a flip over turn similar to front crawl.

The finish is similar to the touching of the wall during a turn.

=== Current styles ===
The three main styles of breaststroke seen today are the conventional (flat), undulating, and wave-style. The undulating style is usually swum by extremely flexible swimmers, (e.g. Amanda Beard), and few people have the flexibility to accomplish it. The wave-style breaststroke was pioneered by Hungarian Swimming Coach Joseph Nagy. The wave-style was swum and made famous by Mike Barrowman when he set a world record using it, and is now commonly swum by Olympians, though Australian swimmers, most prominently Leisel Jones, generally seem to shun it. Olympian Ed Moses still swims a flatter style, despite the rapidly increasing popularity of the wave-style.

The wave-style breaststroke starts in a streamlined position, with shoulders shrugged to decrease drag in the water. While the conventional style is strongest at the outsweep, the wave-style puts much emphasis on the insweep, thus making the head rise later than in the conventional style. The wave-style pull is a circular motion with the hands accelerating to maximum speed and recovering in front of the chin, elbows staying at the surface and in front of the shoulders at all times. The high elbows creates the leverage for the powerful torso and abdominal muscles to assist in the stroke. During the insweep, the swimmer accelerates their hands and hollows their back and lifts themself out of the water to breathe. To visualize, some say that the hands anchor themselves in the water while the hips thrust forward.

The hollowed back and accelerating hands would lift the head out of the water. The head stays in a neutral position, looking down and forward, and the swimmer inhales at this point. The feet retract to the bottom without moving the thigh, thus reducing resistance. The swimmer is at their highest at this point.

Then the swimmer shrugs their shoulders and throws their arms and shoulders forward, lunging cat-like back into the water (though the emphasis is to go forward, not down). As the swimmer sinks, they arch their back, and kick. Timing is very important in order for the kick to transfer all of its force via the arched back, but the optimum time is when the arms are 3/4 extended. Then the swimmer kicks and presses on their chest, undulating a little underwater, and squeezing the gluteus maximus to prevent the legs and feet from rising out of the water. The swimmer has now returned to the streamlined position, and the cycle starts again.

Incidentally, the wave motion should not be overly emphasized and the swimmer should only rise until the water reaches his biceps, instead of pushing his entire torso out of the water, wasting a great deal of energy.

== Competitions ==
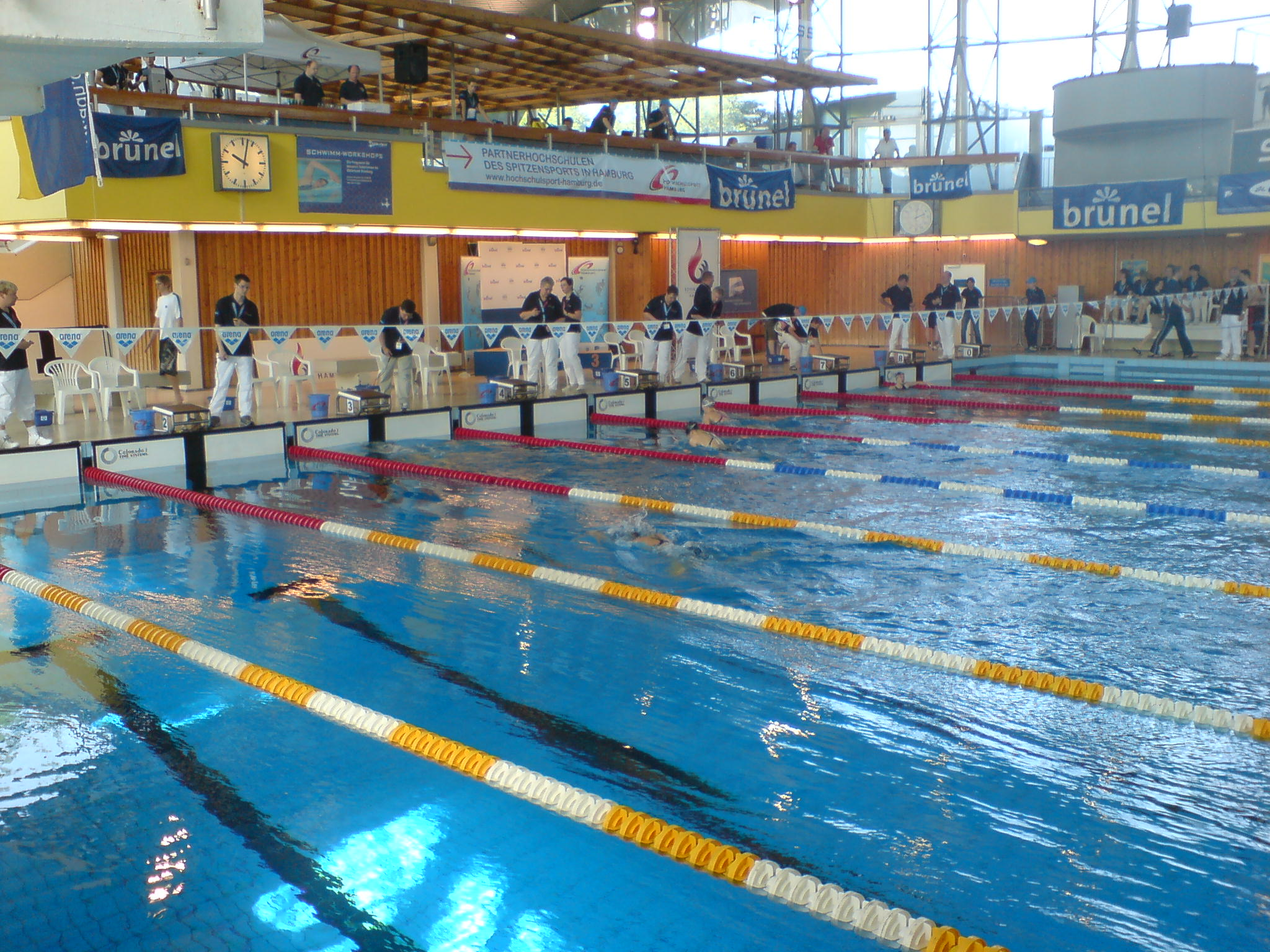
Women's breaststroke at Alsterschwimmhalle during the 2007 German Collegiate Championship

There are eight common distances swum in competitive breaststroke swimming, four in yards and four in meters. Twenty-five-yard pools are common in the United States and are routinely used in age group, high school and college competitions during the winter months.

- 25 yd Breaststroke (age group and club swimming for children 8 and under)
- 50 yd Breaststroke (age group swimming for children 12 and under)
- 100 yd Breaststroke
- 200 yd Breaststroke

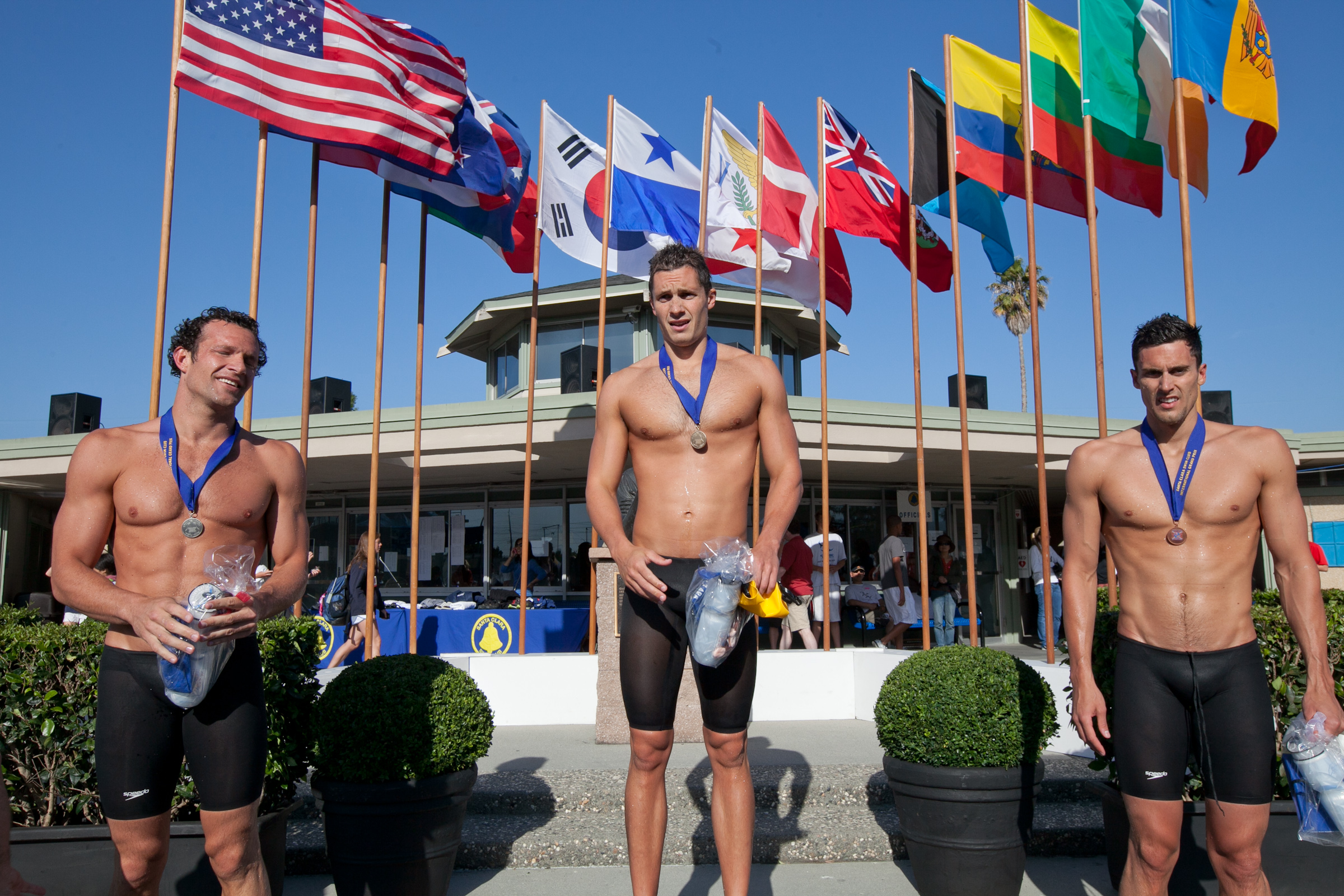
200 meter breaststroke winners at the 2001 Santa Clara Invitational.

Twenty-five meter or 50 meter pool distances

- 25 m Breaststroke (age group and club swimming for children 8 and under, 25 meter pool only, and not swum in year-around swimming)
- 50 m Breaststroke (age group and club swimming for children 12 and under) (and in recent years, World Championships)
- 100 m Breaststroke
- 200 m Breaststroke

Breaststroke is also part of the medley over the following distances:

- 100 yd Individual Medley
- 200 yd Individual Medley
- 400 yd Individual Medley
- 4 × 50 yd Medley Relay
- 4 × 100 yd Medley Relay
- 100 m Individual Medley (short 25 m pool only)
- 200 m Individual Medley
- 400 m Individual Medley
- 4 × 50 m Medley Relay
- 4 × 100 m Medley Relay

== FINA rules ==
These are the official FINA rules. They apply to swimmers during official swimming competitions.

SW 7.1 After the start and after each turn, the swimmer may take one arm stroke completely back to the legs during which the swimmer may be submerged. At any time prior to the first Breaststroke kick after the start and after each turn a single butterfly kick is permitted.

SW 7.2 From the beginning of the first arm stroke after the start and after each turn, the body shall be on the breast. It is not permitted to roll onto the back at any time. From the start and throughout the race the stroke cycle must be one arm stroke and one leg kick in that order. All movements of the arms shall be simultaneous and on the same horizontal plane without alternating movement.

SW 7.3 The hands shall be pushed forward together from the breast on, under, or over the water. The elbows shall be under water except for the final stroke before the turn, during the turn and for the final stroke at the finish. The hands shall be brought back on or under the surface of the water. The hands shall not be brought back beyond the hip line, except during the first stroke after the start and each turn.

SW 7.4 During each complete cycle, some part of the swimmer's head must break the surface of the water. The head must break the surface of the water before the hands turn inward at the widest part of the second stroke. All movements of the legs shall be simultaneous and on the same horizontal plane without alternating movement.

SW 7.5 The feet must be turned outwards during the propulsive part of the kick. A scissors, flutter or downward butterfly kick is not permitted except as in SW 7.1. Breaking the surface of the water with the feet is allowed unless followed by a downward butterfly kick.

SW 7.6 At each turn and at the finish of the race, the touch shall be made with both hands simultaneously at, above, or below the water level. The head may be submerged after the last arm pull prior to the touch, provided it breaks the surface of the water at some point during the last complete or incomplete cycle preceding the touch.

== See also ==
- 50 metres breaststroke
- 100 metres breaststroke
- 200 metres breaststroke
