= Power stroke =

Power Stroke may refer to:

In motoring:

- Power stroke (engine), the stroke of a cyclic motor which generates force
- Power Stroke, a family of Ford diesel engines

Other:

- Power stroke (baseball), a batter who hits for extra bases
- Power stroke (biology), the molecular interactions of muscle contraction
- Power stroke (swimming), a propulsion kick

== See also ==
- Power Stroke Diesel 200, a NASCAR race
