= Swimfin =

Footwear used for personal propulsion through water

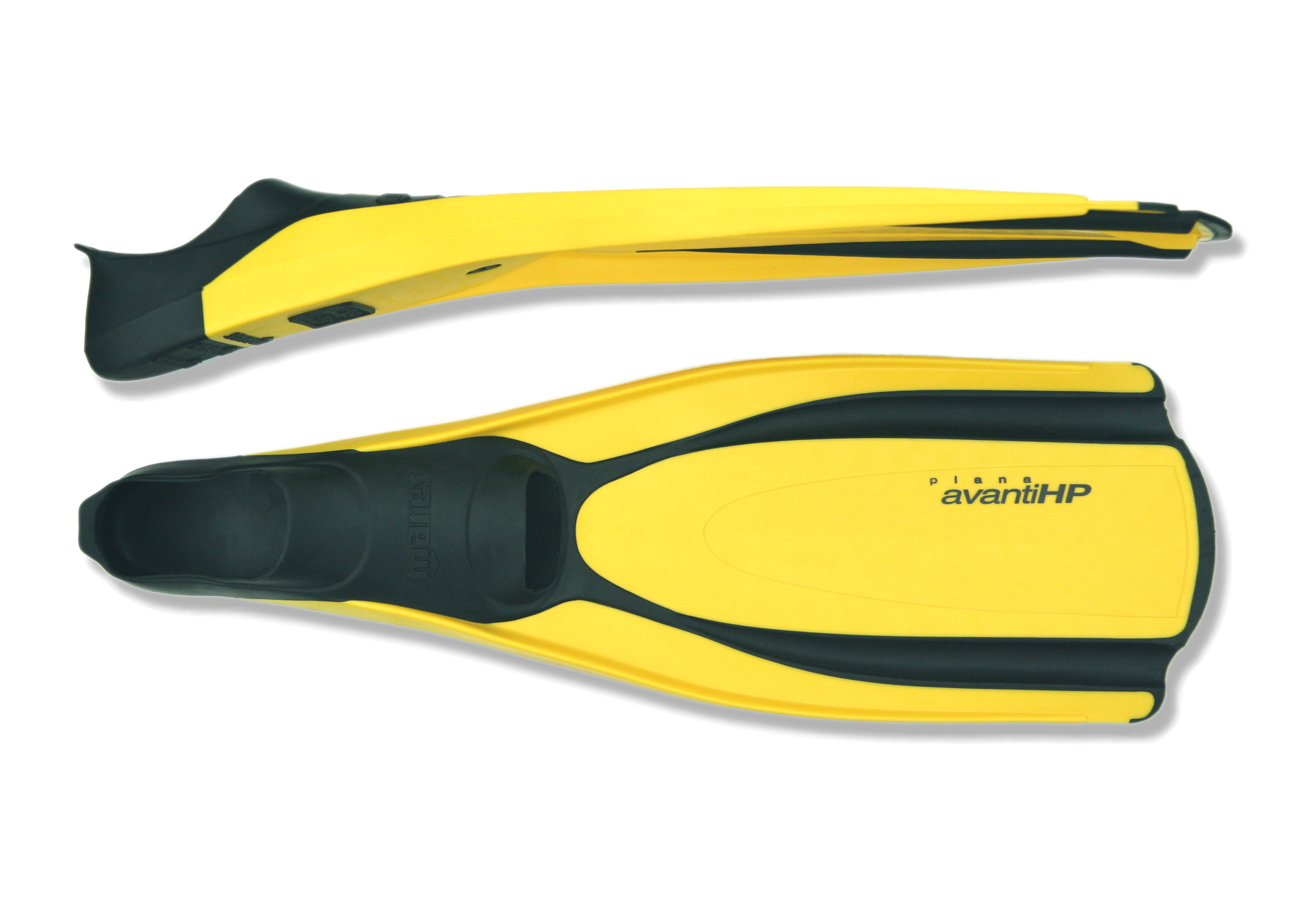
- Full foot fins
- Other names: Fins, flippers
- Uses: Diver and swimmer propulsion

Swimfins, swim fins, diving fins, or flippers are finlike accessories worn on the feet, legs or hands and made from rubber, plastic, carbon fiber or combinations of these materials, to aid movement through the water in water sports activities such as swimming, bodyboarding, bodysurfing, float-tube fishing, kneeboarding, riverboarding, scuba diving, snorkeling, spearfishing, underwater hockey, underwater rugby and various other types of underwater diving.

Swimfins help the wearer to move through water more efficiently, as human feet are too small and inappropriately shaped to provide much thrust, especially when the wearer is carrying equipment that increases hydrodynamic drag. Very long fins and monofins used by freedivers as a means of underwater propulsion do not require high-frequency leg movement. This improves efficiency and helps to minimize oxygen consumption. Short, stiff-bladed fins are effective for short bursts of acceleration and maneuvering, and are useful for bodysurfing.

== History ==
Early inventors, including Leonardo da Vinci and Giovanni Alfonso Borelli, toyed with the concept of swimfins, taking their inspiration from ducks' feet. Benjamin Franklin made a pair of early swimfins (for hands) when he was a young boy living in Boston, Massachusetts near the Charles River; they were two thin pieces of wood, about the shape of an artist's palette, which allowed him to move faster than he usually did in the water.

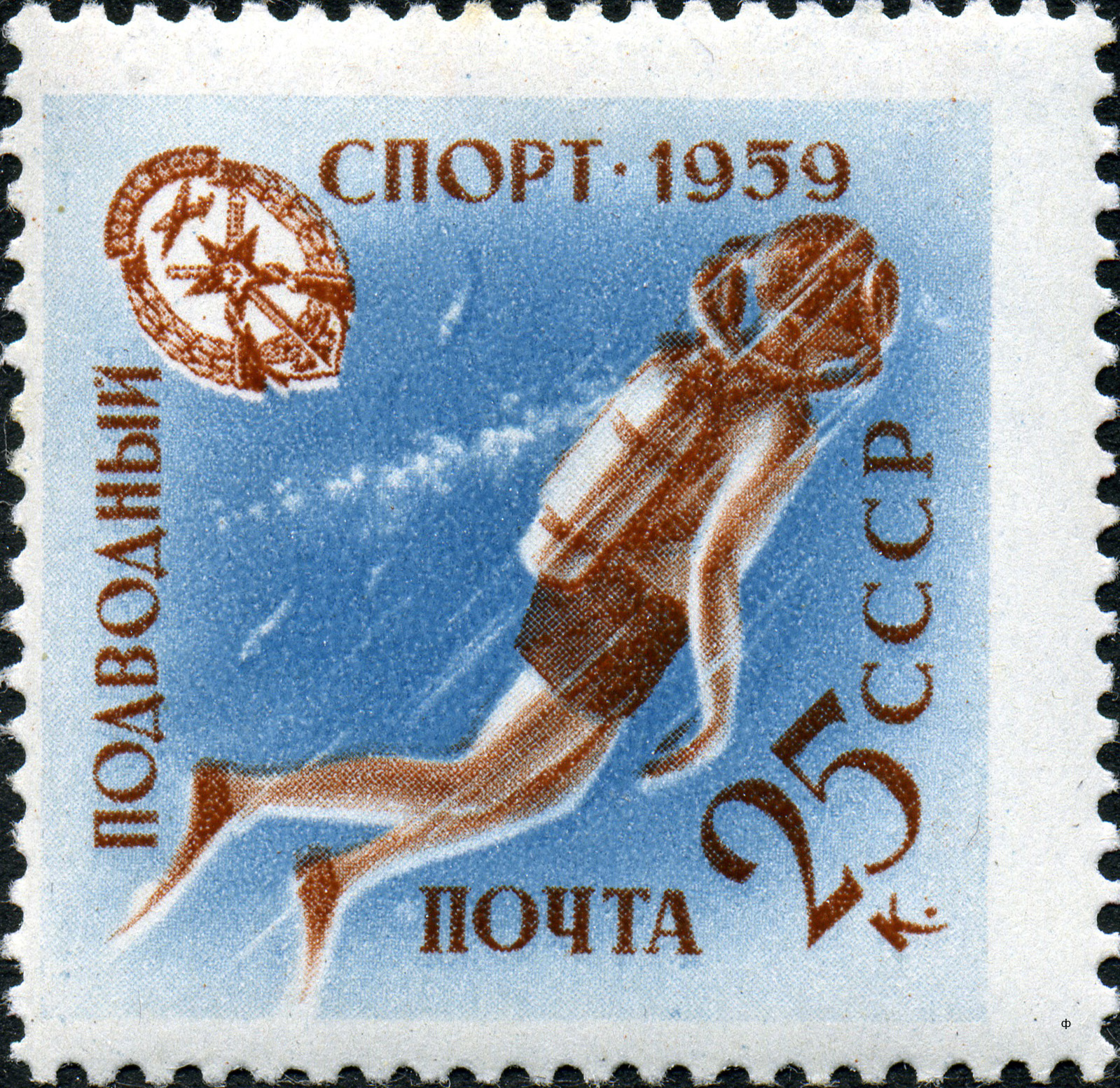
1959 Soviet postage stamp depicting a diver wearing swimfins, issued in connection with DOSAAF, the Soviet paramilitary sports organization

Modern swimfins are an invention by the Frenchman Louis de Corlieu, capitaine de corvette (Lieutenant Commander) in the French Navy. In 1914 Corlieu made a practical demonstration of his first prototype for a group of navy officers, Yves le Prieur among them who, years later in 1926, invented an early model of scuba set. Corlieu left the French Navy in 1924 to fully devote himself to his invention. In April 1933 he registered a patent (number 767013, which in addition to two fins for the feet included two spoon-shaped fins for the hands) and called this equipment propulseurs de natation et de sauvetage (which can be translated literally as "swimming and rescue propulsion device").

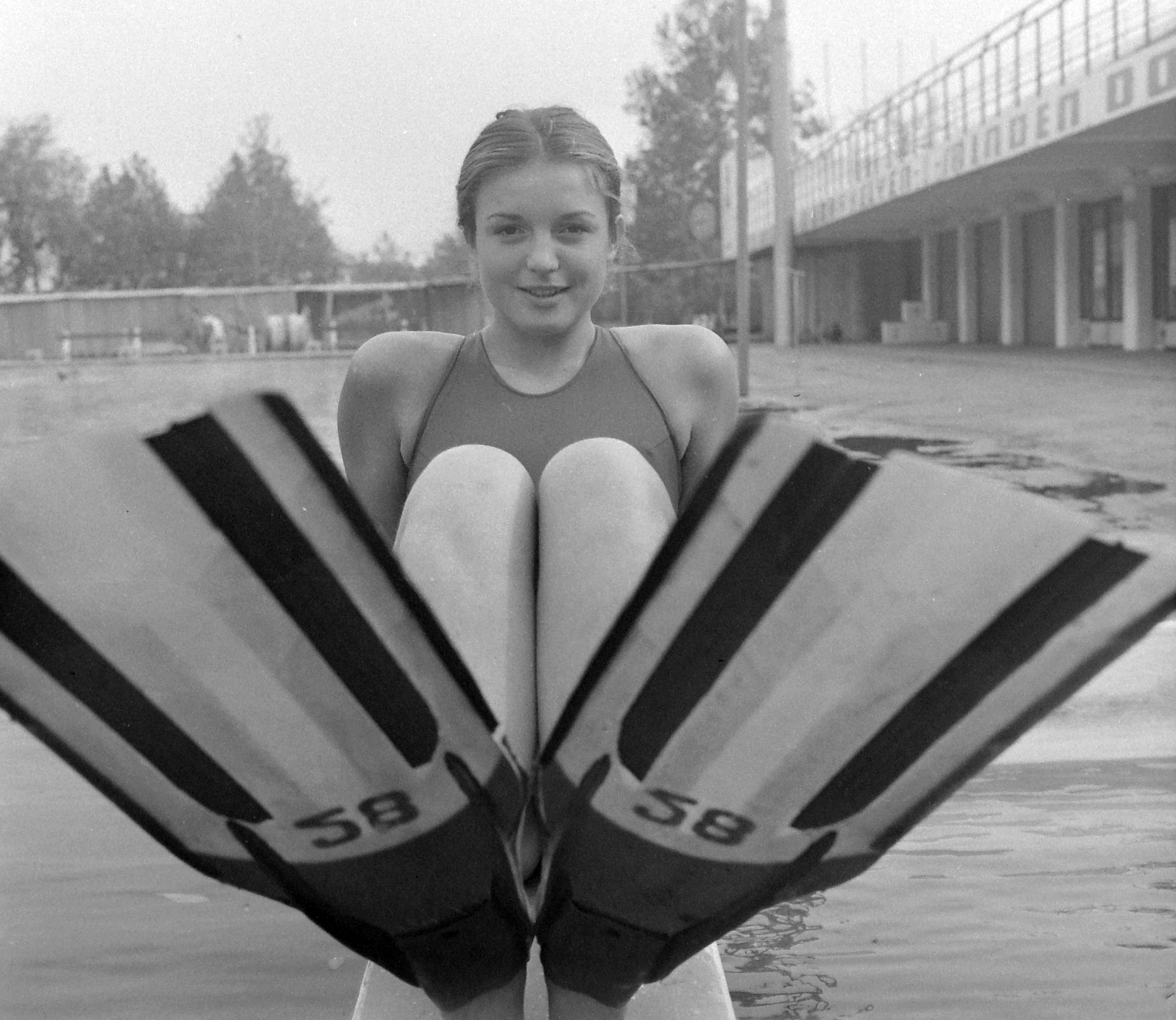
Woman with swimfins at a public pool in Hungary, 1974

After struggling for years, even producing his fins in his own flat in Paris, Louis de Corlieu finally started mass production of his invention in France in 1939. The same year he issued a licence to Owen Churchill for mass production in the United States. To sell his fins in the U.S., Owen Churchill changed the French Corlieu's name (propulseurs) to "swimfins", which is still the common English name. Churchill presented his fins to the US Navy, which decided to acquire them for its Underwater Demolition Team (UDT). American UDT and British COPP frogmen (COPP: Combined Operations Pilotage Parties) used the "Churchill fins" during all prior underwater deminings, thus enabling in 1944 the Normandy landings. During the years after World War II had ended, De Corlieu spent time and efforts struggling in civil procedures, suing others for patent infringement.

In Britain, Dunlop made frogman's fins for World War II, but after the war saw no market for them in peacetime, and, after the first supply of war-surplus frogman's kit was used up, the British public had no access to swimfins (except for home-made attempts such as gluing marine plywood to plimsolls), until Oscar Gugen began importing swimfins and swimming goggles from France.

In 1946 Lillywhites imported about 1,100 pairs of swimfins; they all sold in under 3 months.

In 1948 Luigi Ferraro, collaborating with the Italian diving equipment company Cressi-sub, designed the first full-foot fin, the Rondine, named after the Italian word for swallow. A distinctive feature of Cressi's continuing Rondine full-foot fin line is the embossed outline of the bird on the foot pockets and the blades.

After The Amphibians Club, the UK's first post-war sport diving club, was founded by Ivor Howitt and friends in 1948 in Aberdeenshire, "swim fins were made by wiring stiff rubber piping each side of a flap of inner tube rubber. Very uncomfortable, but they worked. As secretary of The Amphibians, (Howitt) wrote to the Dunlop Rubber Company in February 1949, as they had made the naval frogmen's fins during the war. Incredibly, they replied that they could see no commercial market for swim fins in peacetime. This response reflected the virtual non-existence of sport diving in the UK at that time."

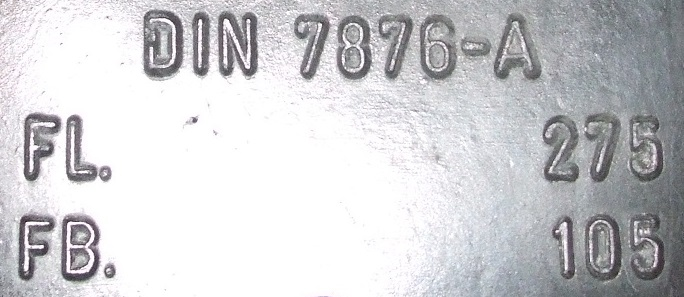
Swim fin sole showing compliance with German standard DIN 7876:1980

=== Standards ===
Seven military, national and international standards relating to swimfins are known to exist: US military standard MIL-S-82258:1965; USSR and CIS standard GOST 22469—77 (Active); German standard DIN 7876:1980; Polish Industry Standard BN-82/8444-17.02. (Active). Austrian standard ÖNORM S 4224:1988; Malaysian standards MS 974:1985; MS 974:2002 (Active); and European standard EN 16804:2015 (Active).

== Types ==
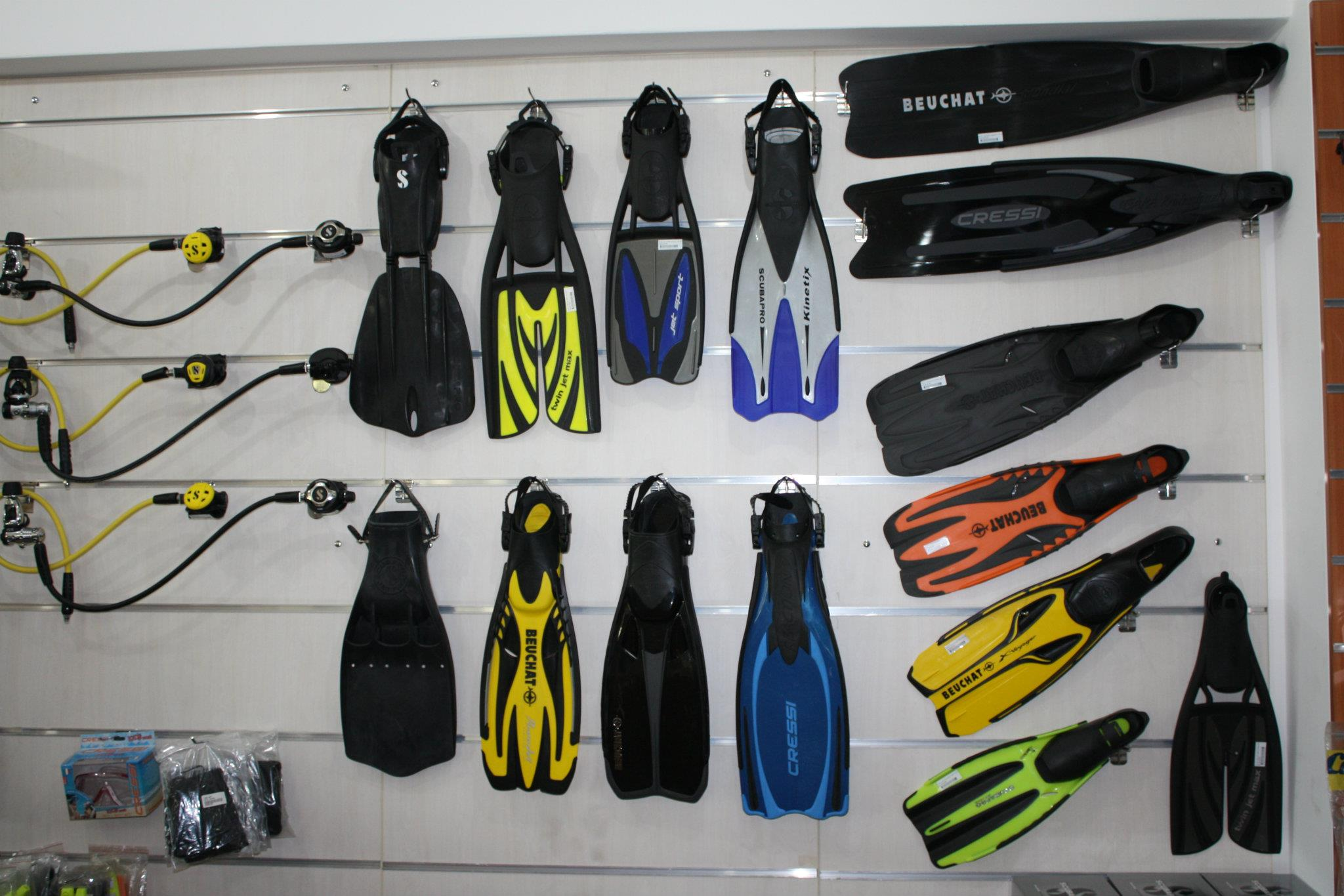
An assortment of fins in a diving shop. Fins on the right are full foot and those in the middle are open heel.

Types of fins have evolved to address the requirements of each community using them. Recreational snorkellers generally use lightweight flexible fins. Free divers favour extremely long fins for efficiency of energy use. Scuba divers need large wide fins to overcome the water resistance caused by their diving equipment, and short enough to allow acceptable maneuvering. Ocean swimmers, bodysurfers, and lifeguards favour smaller designs that stay on their feet when moving through large surf and that make walking on the beach less awkward. Participants in the sports of underwater hockey or underwater rugby use either full-foot or open-heel fins, and the chosen fin style is usually a compromise in performance between straight-line power and turning flexibility - carbon fibre blades are popular at higher levels of competition, but the over-riding requirement is that the fins must not have sharp or unprotected edges or points, nor buckles, which could injure other competitors. Structurally, a swimfin comprises a blade for propulsion and a means of attaching the blade to the wearer's foot.

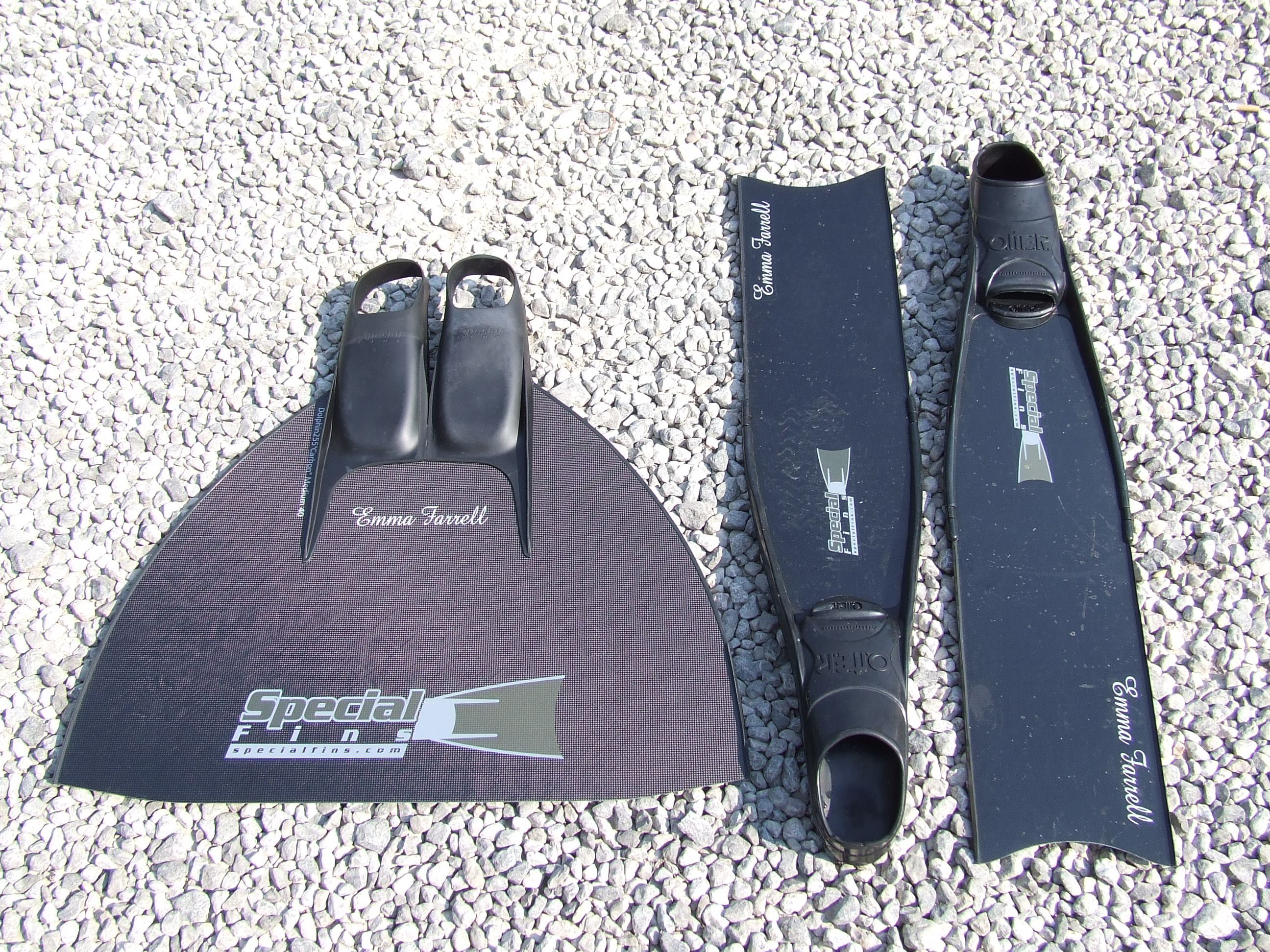
Monofin (left) and pair of freediving bifins (right)

=== Fins vs monofins ===
The vast majority of fins come as a pair, one fin is worn on each foot. This arrangement is also called bifins, to distinguish it from monofins. A monofin is typically used in finswimming and free-diving and it consists of a single fin blade attached to twin foot pockets for both the diver's feet. Monofins and long bifin blades can be made of glass fibre or carbon fibre composites. The diver's muscle power and swimming style, and the type of activity the fins are used for, determine the choice of size, stiffness, and materials.

=== Full-foot vs open-heel ===
Full-foot or closed-heel fins fit like a shoe and are designed to be worn over bare feet or soft neoprene socks; they are sometimes called "slipper" fins. Most fins with complete foot coverage have toe openings for comfort and for ease of water drainage inside the foot pocket. If a larger size is chosen, however, full-foot fins can also be worn over thicker neoprene socks or thin-soled booties. They are commonly used for surface swimming, and come in non-adjustable sizes.

Open-heel fins have a foot pocket with an open heel area, and the fin is held to the foot by springs or straps which are usually adjustable and so will fit a limited range of foot sizes. They can be worn over boots and are common in diving, in particular where a diver has to walk into the water from a shore and requires foot protection. Some manufacturers produce fins with the same blade architecture but a choice of heel type.

=== Paddle vs split ===
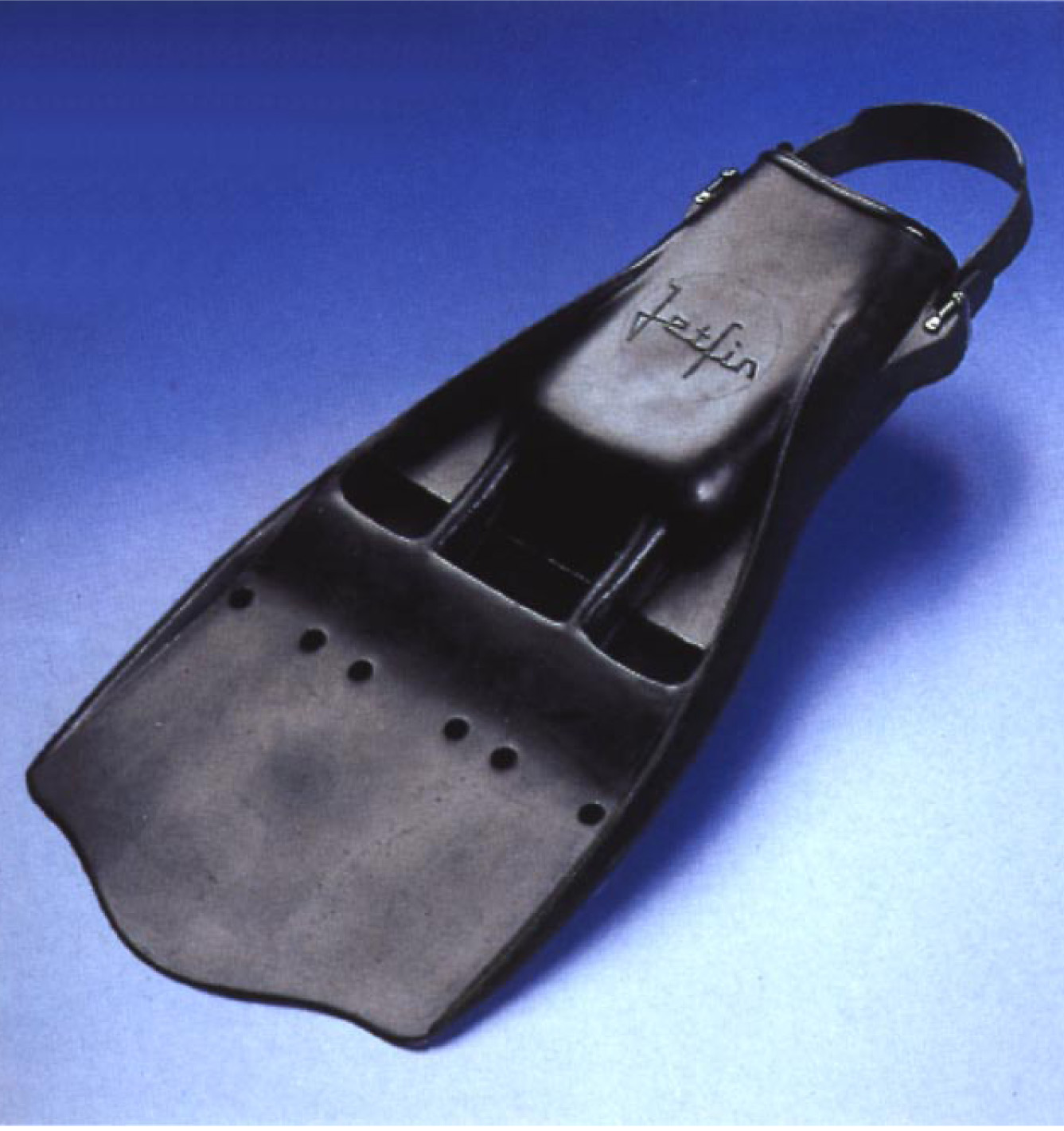
An open-heel vented paddle Jetfin

Paddle fins have simple plastic, composite, or rubber blades that work as extensions of the feet while kicking. Some paddle fins have channels and grooves claimed to improve power and efficiency though it has been shown that the desired effect does not usually occur. Relatively stiff paddle fins are widely believed to be the most versatile and have improved swimming economy in men. Tests in women showed a more flexible fin to be more economical, most likely due to lower leg power. Stiff paddle fins are required for certain types of kicks — such as back kicks and helicopter turns — performed by scuba divers trained in cave diving and wreck diving to avoid stirring up sediment.

Some swimfins have a split along the centreline of the blade. The manufacturers claim that split fins operate similarly to a propeller, by creating lift forces to move the swimmer forwards. The claim is that water flowing toward the center of the fin's "paddle" portion also gains speed as it focuses, creating a "suction" force. A 2003 study by Pendergast et al called this into question by showing that there was no significant change in performance for a particular split fin design when the split was taped over. The technology used in most commercial split fin designs is patented by the industrial design firm Nature's Wing, and is used under license.

=== Paddle variations ===
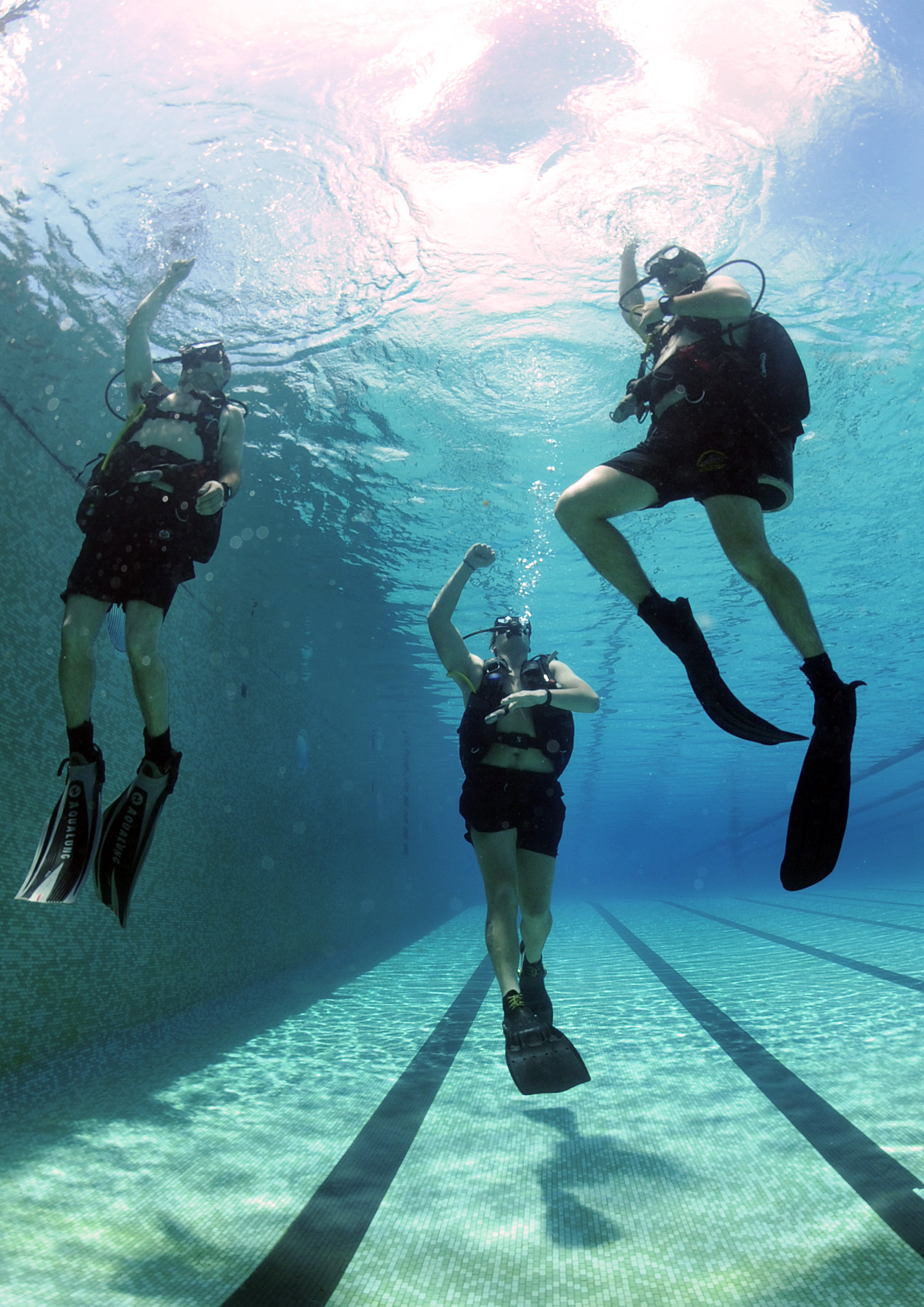
Divers using paddle fins

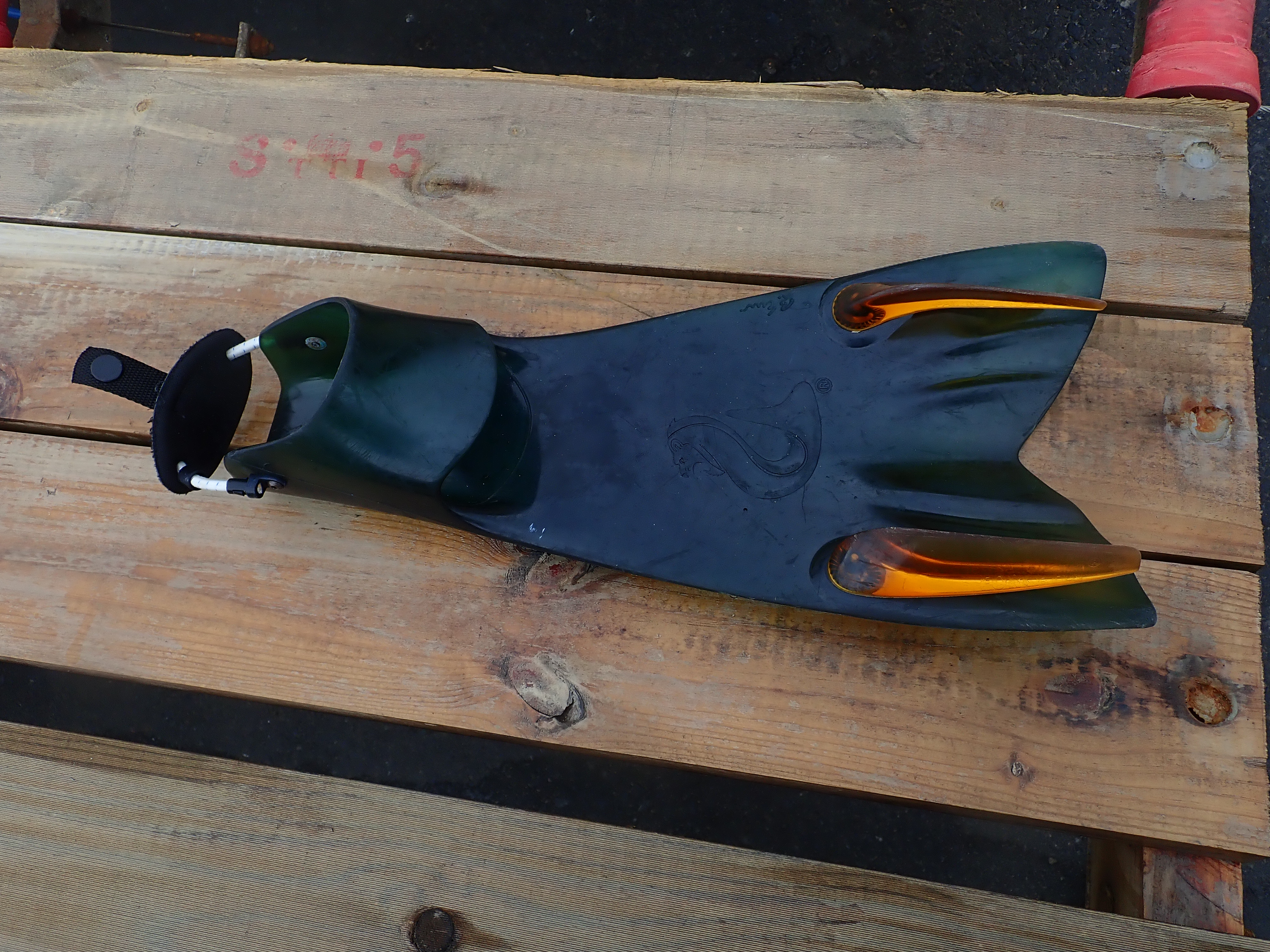
Fin design intended to reduce fatigue

==== Vented ====
Vented fins were first designed in 1964 by Georges Beuchat and commercialised as Jetfins. The Jetfin tradename and design were sold to Scubapro in the 1970s. Vented fins are generally stiff paddle fins that have vents at the base of the foot pocket. The vents are intended to allow for the passage of water during the recovery stroke, but prevent passage during power strokes due to the blade angle, attempting to lessen effort during recovery and improve kick efficiency. A review and study by Pendergast et al in 2003 concluded that vented fins did not improve economy, implying that water does not pass through the vents. The study is only partially significant because it only considers the flutter kick, whereas the jetfin is mostly used with frog kick in the technical diving community. There is a risk of objects snagging in the vents.

==== Freediving ====
These are very similar to paddle fins, except they are far longer, and designed to work with slow stiff-legged kicks that are claimed to conserve oxygen and energy. The vast majority are made in the "full-foot" design with very rigid footpockets, which serves to reduce weight and maximize power transfer from the leg into the fin. Freediving fin blades are commonly made of plastic, but are also often made from composite materials using fibreglass or carbon fibre reinforcement. The composite blades are more resilient and absorb less energy when flexing, but are relatively fragile and more easily damaged.

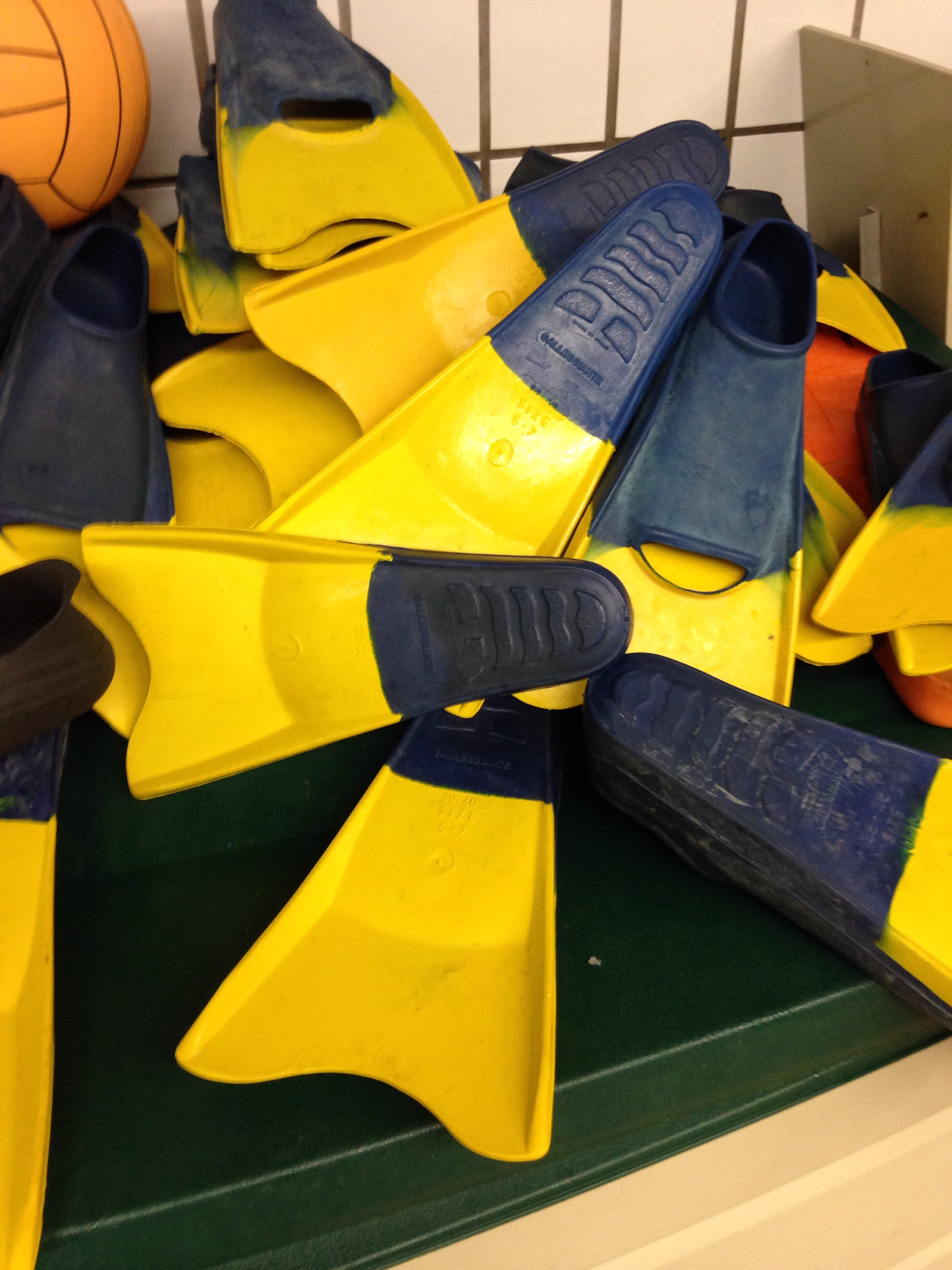
Swimfins designed for swim training.

==== Swimming training ====
The value of fins as an active aid in the teaching, learning and practice of swimming has long been recognised. In the US, as early as 1947, they were used experimentally to build the confidence of reluctant beginners in swimming, while a 1950 YMCA lifesaving and water safety manual reminded swimming instructors how "flippers can be used to great advantage for treading water, surface diving, towing, underwater searching and supporting a tired swimmer". In 1967, research was conducted on fin use in teaching the crawl stroke. During the 1970s, the so-called "flipper-float" method came into vogue in Europe with the aim of helping beginners learn to swim faster and more safely, while the deployment of fins to assist competitive swimmers in building sprint swimming speed skills also came under scrutiny. By 1990, ready-made short-bladed fins such as Marty Hull's "Zoomers" and cut-down longer-bladed fins became popular for lap swimming as swim workouts grew to be more nuanced and less regimented. Training fins, as they are now called, continue to be popular tools in an aquatic athlete's swimbag well into the new millennium, for recreational reasons as well as skill-building purposes.

==== Bodysurfing ====
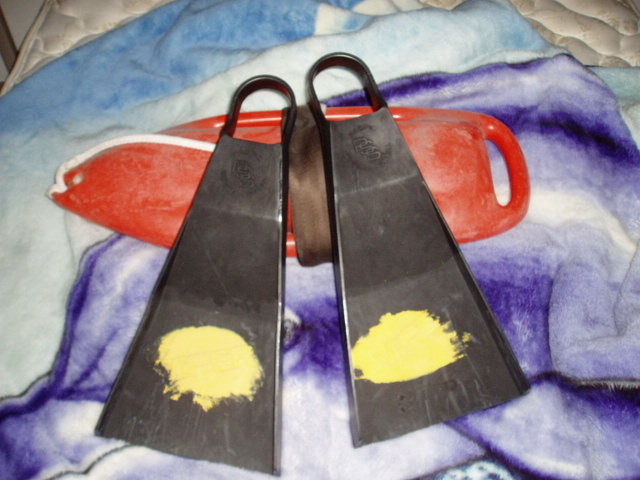
Swimfins designed for bodyboarding or bodysurfing.

Fins intended for bodyboarding or bodysurfing are usually relatively short with a stiff-blade, designed to produce a short burst of power and assist in catching a wave. Some versions have blades which are shorter at the inside edge. They are often made with an integral strap but an open heel, allowing sand to wash out more easily.

== Attachment ==
Open heel fins are secured to the foot by a strap which passes around the back of the ankle. These are usually elastic and may be adjustable. Early fins used rubber straps connected to the fin by a wire buckle, and were not readily adjustable. Later versions incorporated swivels, buckles, quick release connectors and adjustable tension, but the increased complexity and decreased reliability, and tendency of the loose strap ends to hook on things triggered a return by some manufacturers and aftermarket accessory manufacturers to simpler systems. These include stainless steel spring straps and bungee straps, which once set up, are not adjustable, and which reduce the number of potential failure points and places where the fin can snag on obstructions like net, line and seaweed. Some heel straps have a loop for better grip with wet hands or gloves. Some fins designed for surf use have integral straps which can neither be replaced nor adjusted, but are simple and have no projections which can snag or scratch the swimmer's legs. They are much like full foot pocket fins without the back part of the sole, but do not trap as much sand when used in the surf.

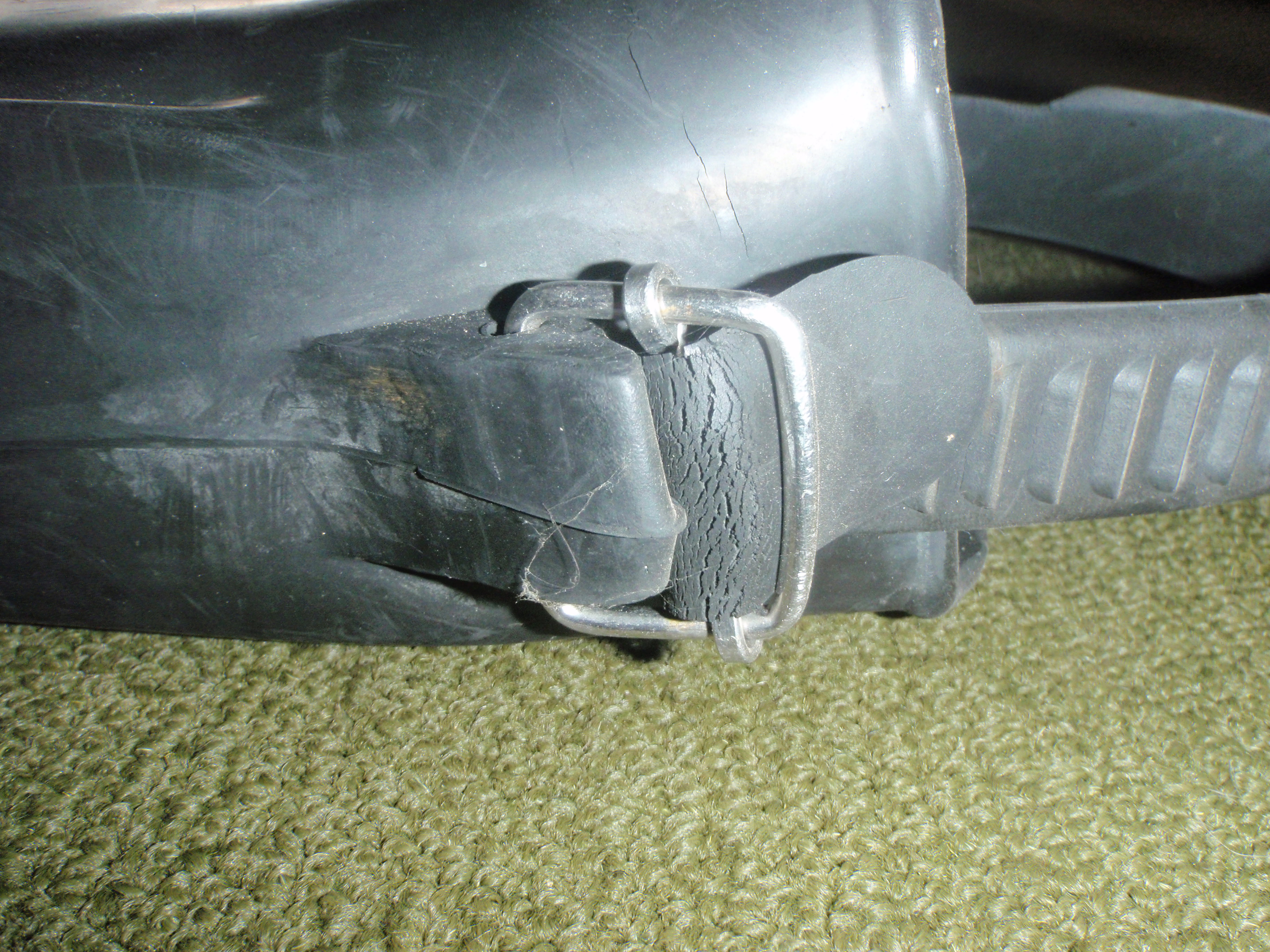
Swim fin strap attachment with simple rubber strap and wire buckle

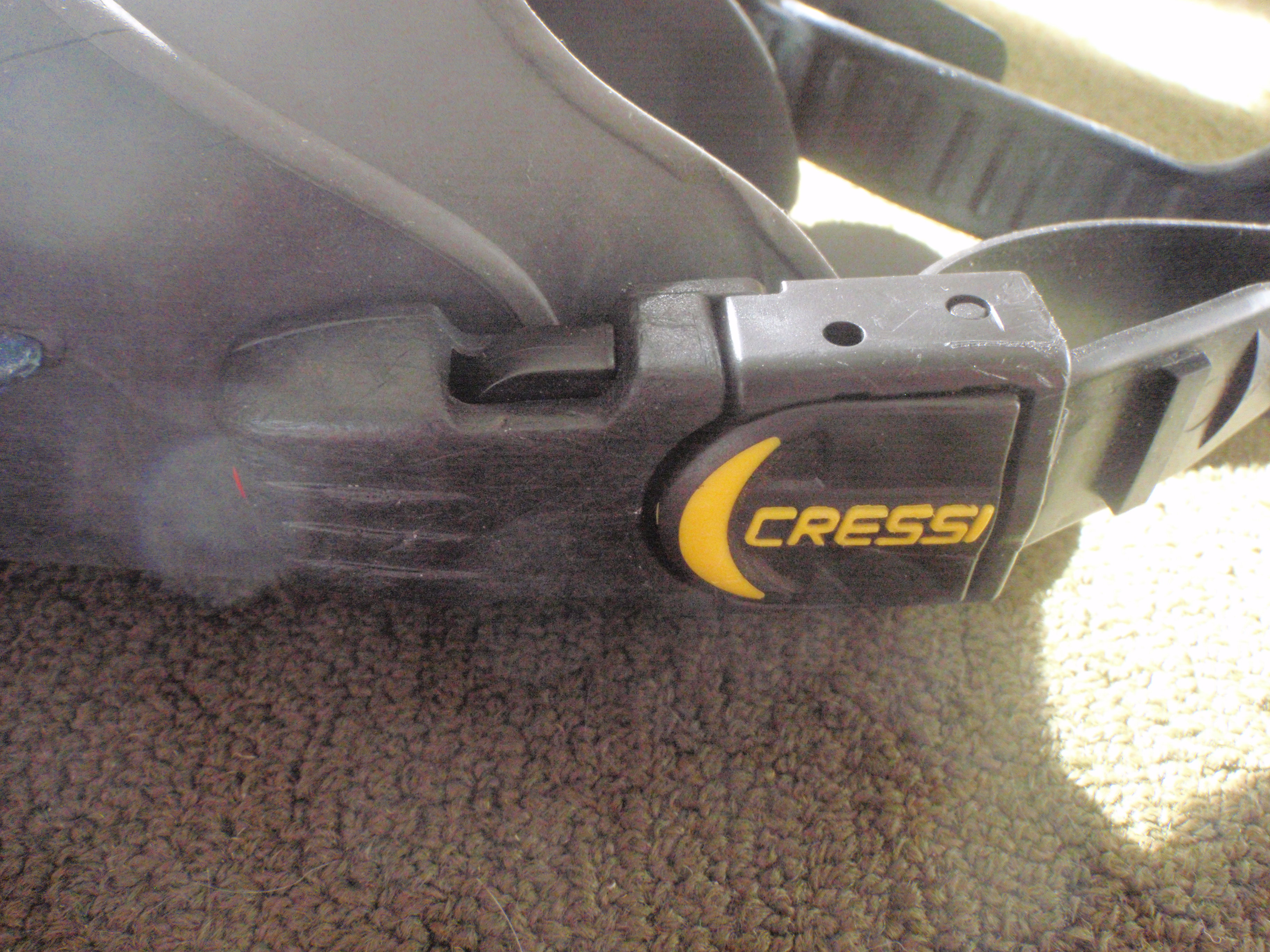
Swim fin strap attachment with swivelling plastic buckle and clip

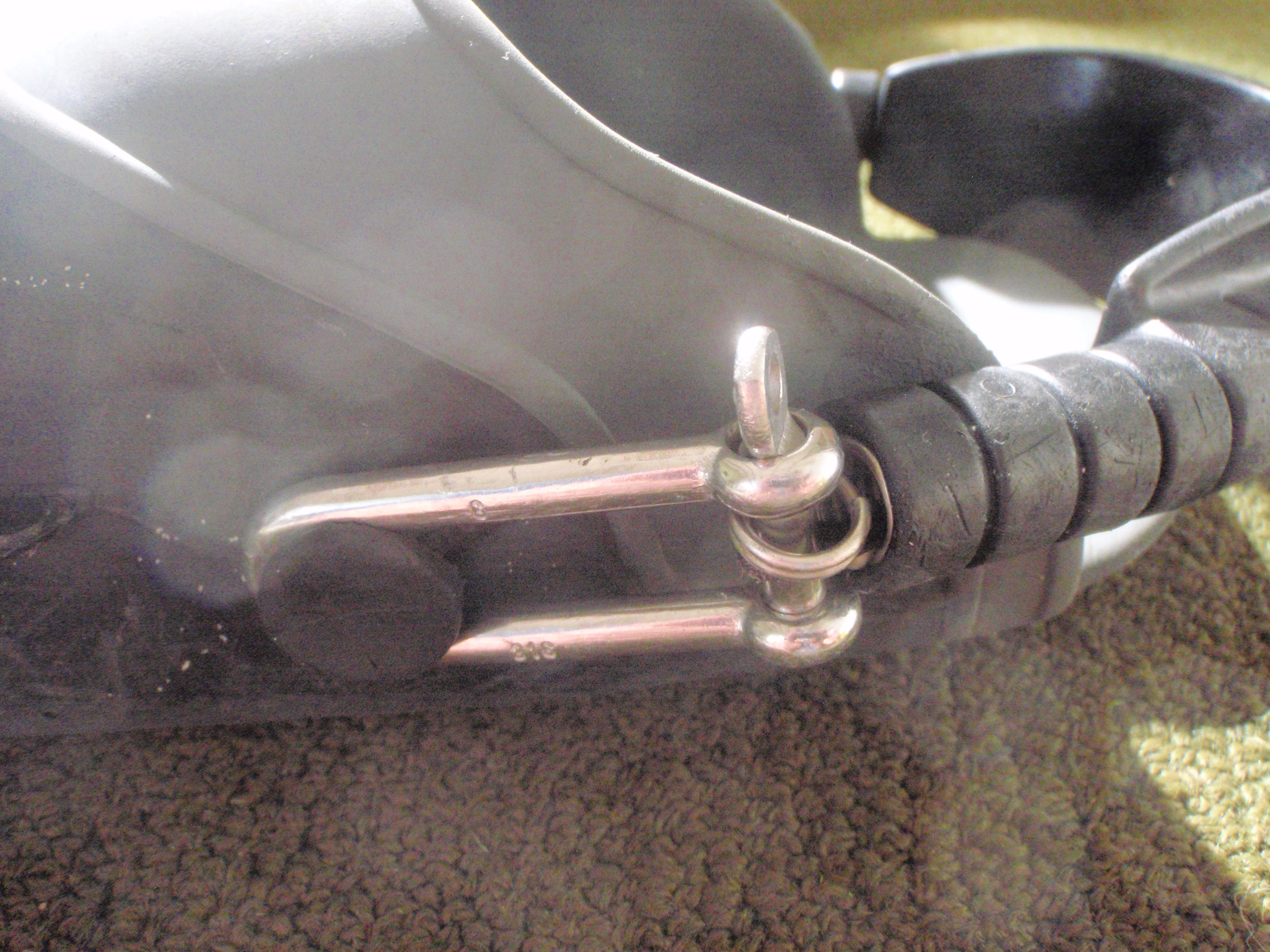
Aftermarket stainless steel spring fin strap attached with long D-shackles for security

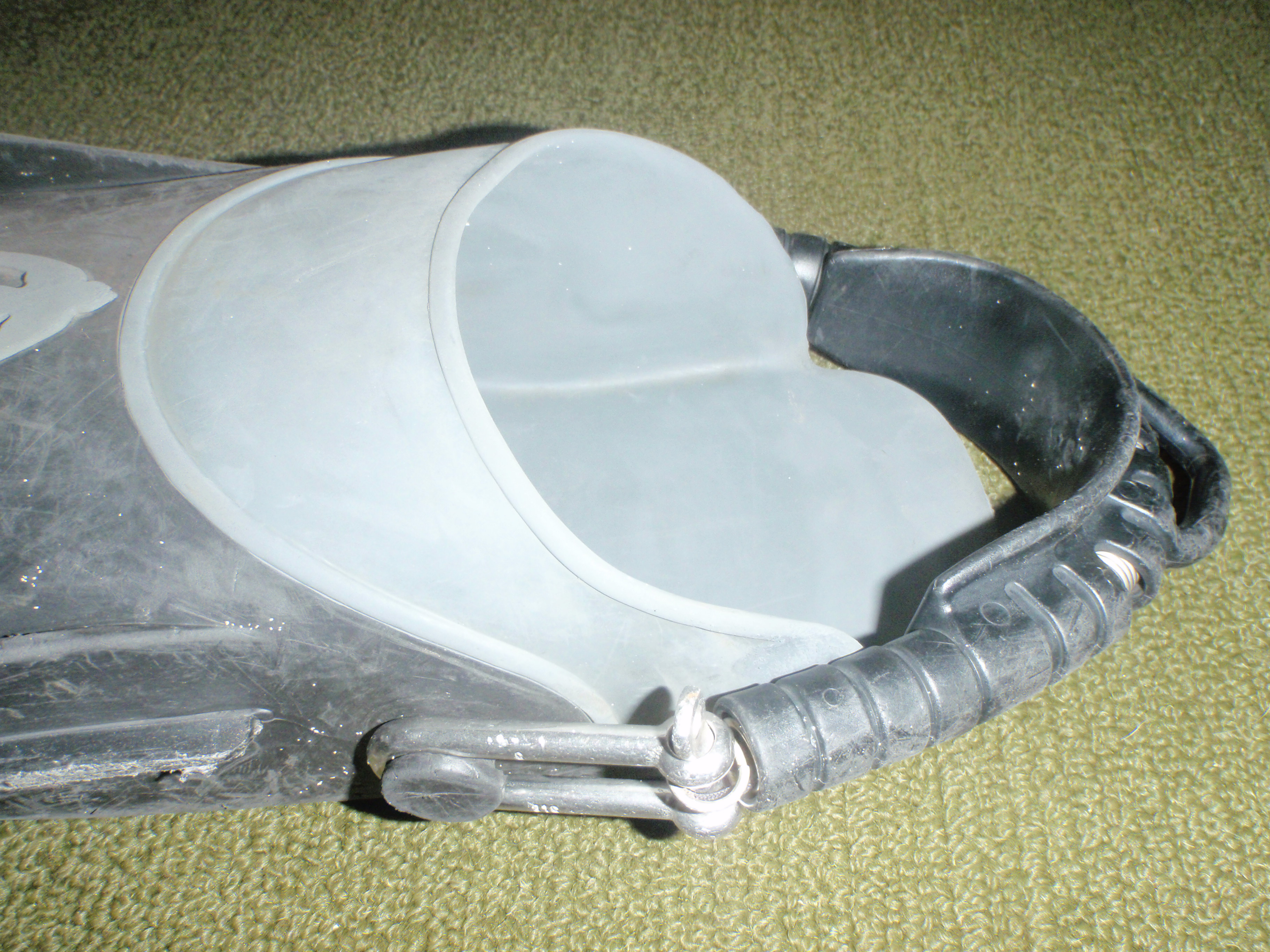
Open heel fin with stainless steel spring strap with rubber padding

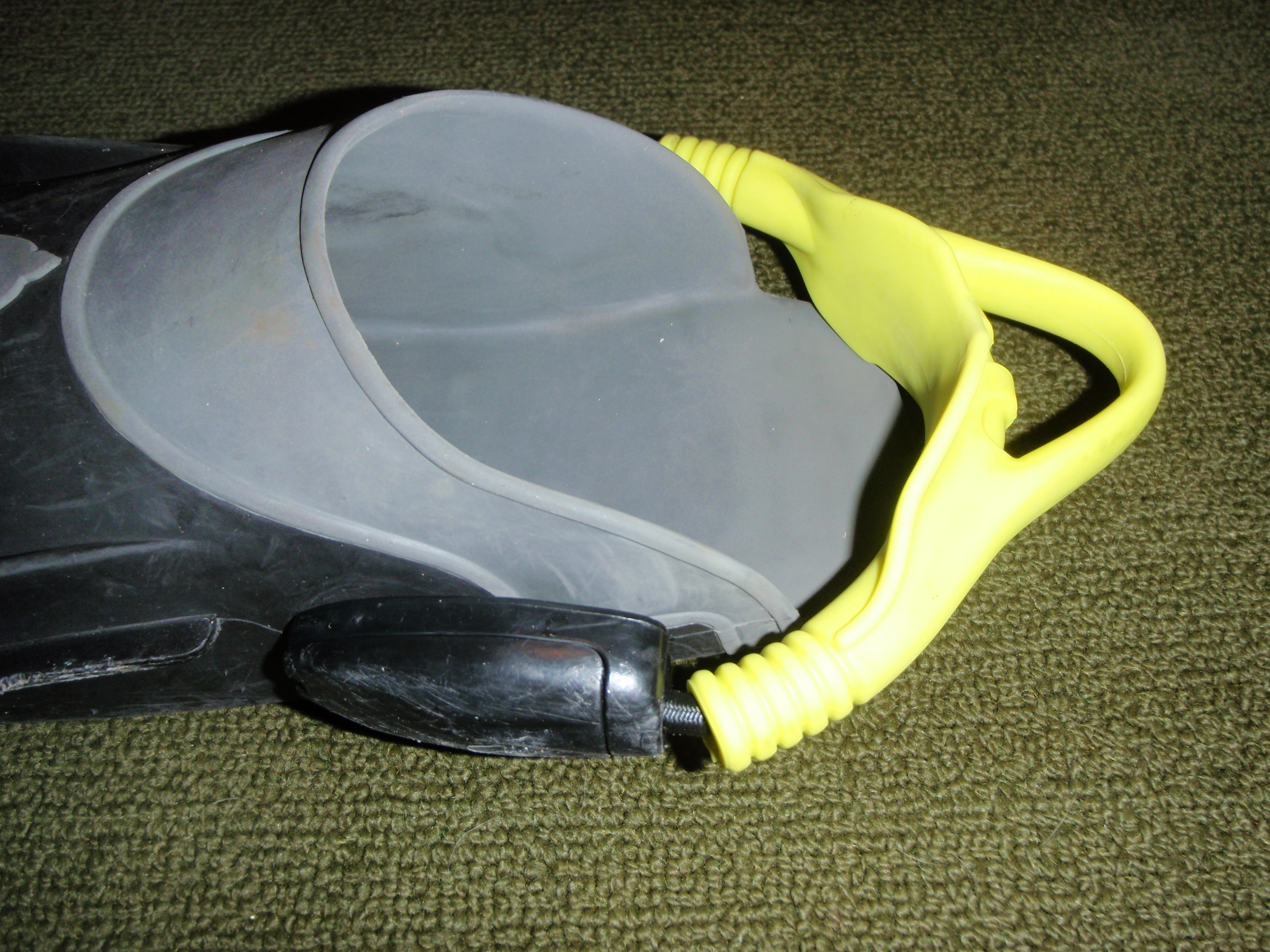
Fin with bungee strap

=== Fin retainers ===
A full-foot swimming fin is designed to be secured on the foot by the elasticity of the fin's heelpiece. If this fin has a slightly oversized foot pocket, it may fall off when the user is swimming in choppy waters, but a pair of fin grips can help avert this mishap. Fixe-palmes, fin retainers, or fin grips, were invented and patented in 1959 by the French diving equipment company Beuchat in Marseille. Widely copied during the 1970s, they are simple flat rings with three loops or straps made from thin high stretch rubber. These Y-shaped anchor straps are worn over the arch, the heel and the instep of each foot in order to secure strapless shoe-fitting (full foot) swim fins (see Figure 3). Although they are not designed to hold open-heel and strap models on, some swimmers and divers use them for this purpose. One loop is pulled over the foot above the ankle and the swim fin fitted to the foot. The second loop is pulled under the heel of the fin, leaving the remaining loop at the back of the heel. This procedure is illustrated in Figures 4–7.

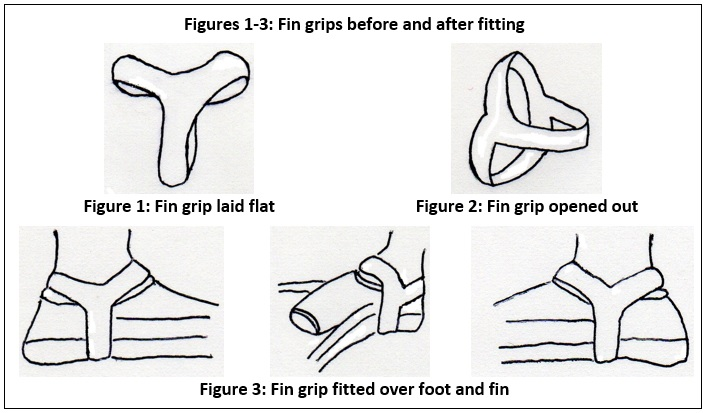
Figures 1–3: Fin grips before and after fitting

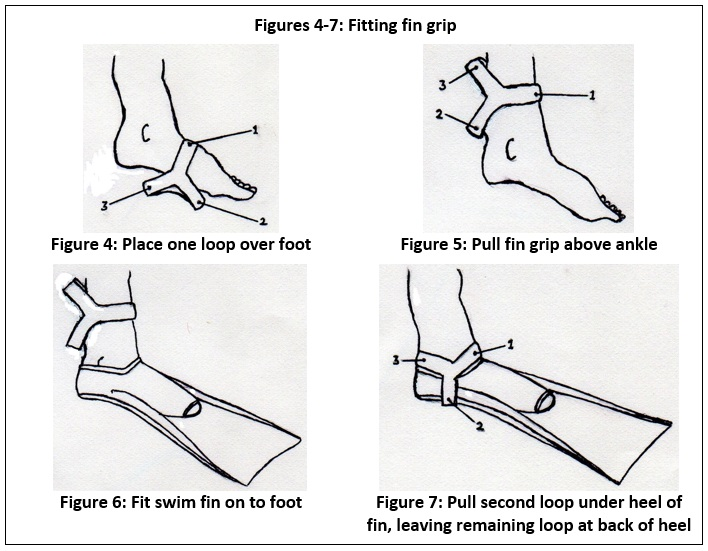
Figures 4–7: How fin grips are fitted on full-foot swimming fins

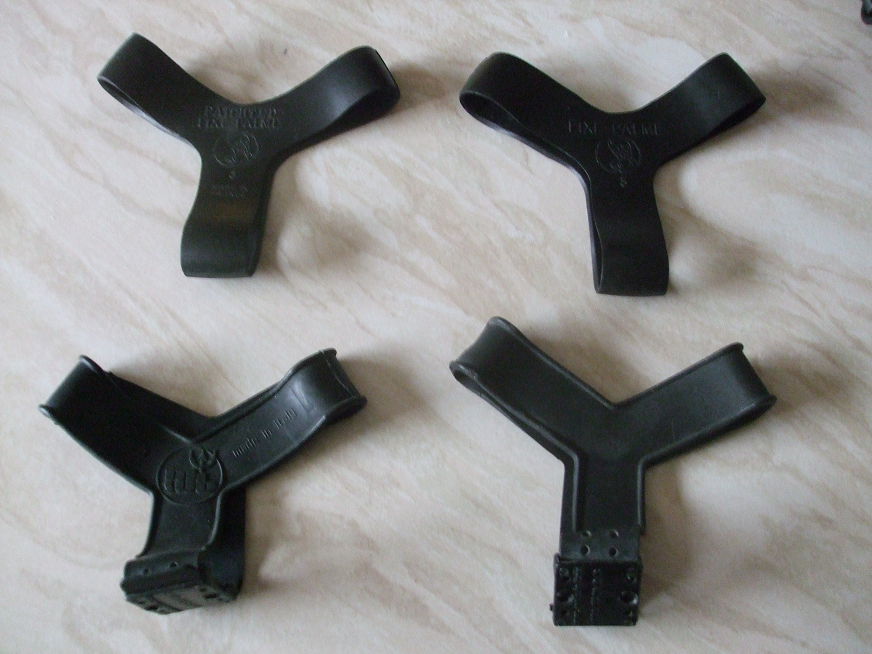
Two pairs of early fin grips: Beuchat Fixe-Palmes and Mares Fissapinne

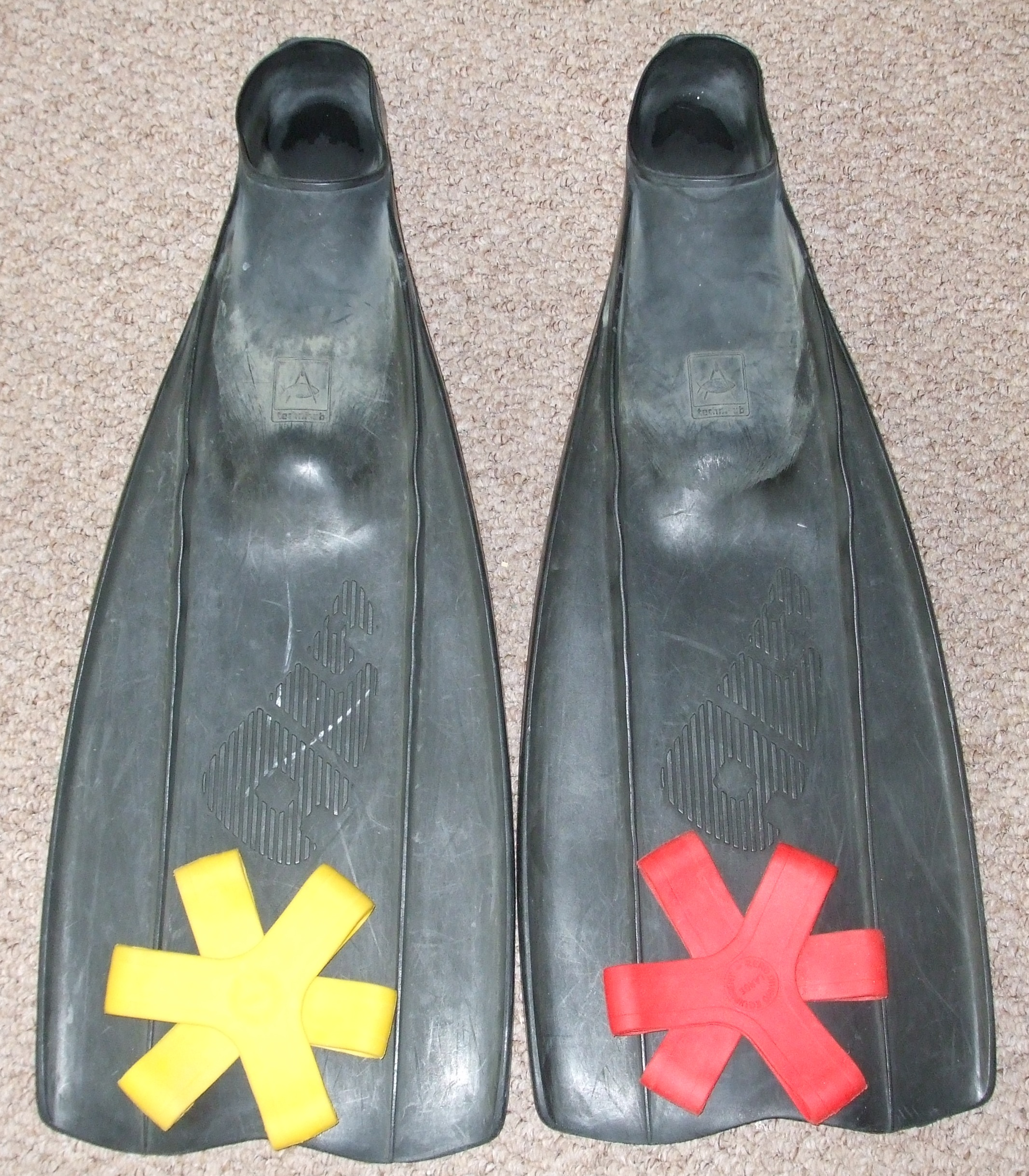
Underwater hockey fins with yellow and red pairs of fin grips

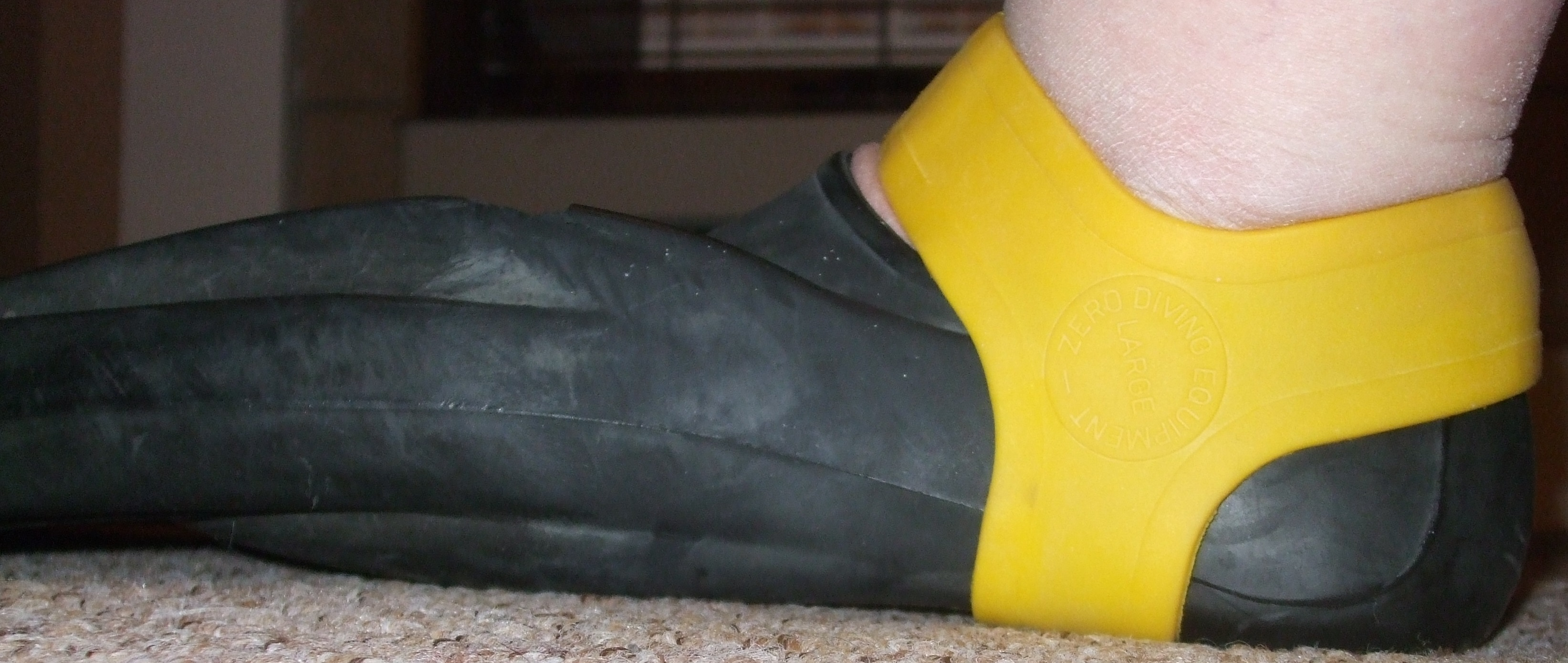
A fin grip positioned to secure a full-foot swimming fin on the foot

== Use ==
A scuba diver using swimfins to move around an aquarium tank

=== Techniques ===
The use of swimfins for propulsion can be divided into propulsion and maneuvering aspects.

==== Propulsion ====
Three basic modes of propulsive finning can be distinguished:

- Scissor or flutter kick involves alternate motion of the fins parallel to the sagittal plane of the swimmer. As the one leg thrusts in the ventral direction in the power stroke, the other performs the return stroke, which provides some thrust, but is significantly less powerful in most cases as the ankle tends to feather the blade. The blade must bend during the power stroke to thrust water away from the diver and thereby provide propulsion along the centreline. Efficient propulsion requires a low drag attitude in the water, and thrust along the direction of movement.
- Frog kick involves the simultaneous and laterally mirrored motion of both legs together, mostly parallel to the frontal plane. The power stroke is provided by thrusting the fins distally and towards the centreline by extending hips, knees and ankles, while rotating the fins to maximise thrust. The recovery stroke pulls the feathered fins towards the centre of mass and apart by flexing the hips, knees and ankles.
- Dolphin kick uses both legs together in a parallel motion. The movements are similar to those of flutter kick, but both legs perform the power and recovery strokes together. There is more use of the back and abdominal muscles, and considerable power can be exerted, but this requires equivalent effort, and can be stressful on people with lower back problems. Dolphin kick can be used with all fin types, and is the only option available when using a monofin.

Modified styles of flutter and frog kick can be used to reduce down-flow of water which can disturb silt and reduce visibility, and are used when finning close to silty surfaces, such as inside caves and wrecks, or near the bottom of quarries, dams, lakes and some harbours.

==== Maneuvering ====
Turning on the spot and reversing are possible with suitable fins and skills.

- The back kick is used to provide thrust along the length of the body, but in the opposite direction to normal propulsion. Back kick reversing is considered maneuvering rather than propulsion as it is relatively very inefficient and only used when necessary.
- A helicopter turn is the rotation of the horizontal swimmer around a vertical axis through the body, by paddling movements of one or both fins, using mostly lower leg and ankle movement. The use of a separate fin on each foot allows far more freedom of motion for manoeuvering, as they can be used independently, in parallel or in opposition to produce thrust in a wide variety of directions. Manoeuvrability with a monofin is relatively restricted.

=== Training ===
Divers are initially taught to fin with legs straight, without excess bending of the knee, the action coming from the hips; a leg action with much upper leg flexion with bent knees like riding a bicycle is inefficient and is a common fault with divers who have not learned properly how to fin swim. This leg action feels easier because it is actually producing less thrust. Fins with differing characteristics (e.g. stiffness) may be preferred, depending on the application, and divers may have to learn a modified finning style to match.

=== Power ===
The upper sustainable limit of a diver's fin-kick thrust force using a stationary-swimming ergometer was shown to be 64 newtons (14 lbf). The maximum thrust averaged over 20 seconds against a strain gauge has been measured as high as 192 newtons (43 lbf). Resistive respiratory muscle training improves and maintains endurance fin swimming performance in divers.

=== Ergonomics ===
Experimental work suggests that larger fin blades are more efficient in converting diver effort to thrust, and are more economical in breathing gas for similar propulsive effect. Larger fins were perceived to be less fatiguing than smaller fins.

== See also ==
- Diving equipment – Equipment used to facilitate underwater diving
- Doing It Right (scuba diving) – Technical diving safety philosophy
- Finswimming – Competitive watersport using swimfins for propulsion
- Freediving – Underwater diving without breathing apparatus
- Human factors in diving equipment design – Influence of the interaction between the user and the equipment on design
- Scuba skills – Skills required to scuba-dive safely
- Underwater orienteering – Underwater compass navigation and speed competition on scuba.
- Underwater hockey – Underwater sport of pushing a puck into the opposing goal
- Underwater rugby – Underwater team sport
