= Finning techniques =

Techniques used by divers and surface swimmers using swimfins

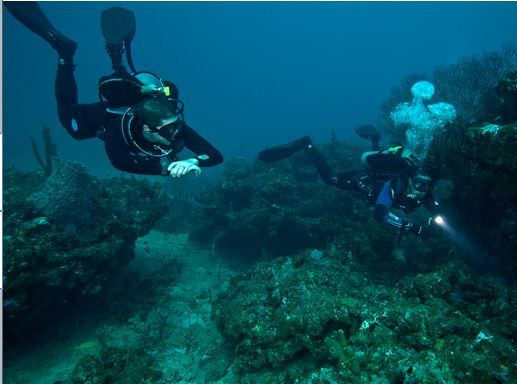
Two divers using frog kicks, in the resting position with bent knees and fins horizontal

Finning techniques are the skills and methods used by swimmers and underwater divers to propel themselves through the water and to maneuver when wearing swimfins. There are several styles used for propulsion, some of which are more suited to particular swimfin configurations. There are also techniques for positional maneuvering, such as rotation on the spot, which may not involve significant locational change. Use of the most appropriate finning style for the circumstances can increase propulsive efficiency, reduce fatigue, improve precision of maneuvering and control of the diver's position in the water, and thereby increase the task effectiveness of the diver and reduce the impact on the environment. Propulsion through water requires much more work than through air due to higher density and viscosity. Diving equipment which is bulky usually increases drag, and reduction of drag can significantly reduce the effort of finning. This can be done to some extent by streamlining diving equipment, and by swimming along the axis of least drag, which requires correct diver trim. Efficient production of thrust also reduces the effort required, but there are also situations where efficiency must be traded off against practical necessity related to the environment or task in hand, such as the ability to maneuver effectively and resistance to damage of the equipment.

Good buoyancy control and trim combined with appropriate finning techniques and situational awareness can minimise the environmental impact of recreational diving.

== Use of swimfins ==
The basic diving skills of finning, buoyancy control, trim and breathing style work in combination for effective diving performance. Swimfins are far more effective and efficient for diver propulsion than arm and hand movement in the water. Swimfins are used to provide propulsion and maneuvering for divers, and may be designed and chosen specifically to emphasise one of these functions. Optimisation for one generally implies degradation of capabilities in the other, and other factors such as durability and cost also influence manufacture and selection.

The effectiveness of finning techniques is partly dependent on the fins used, and partly on the skill and fitness of the diver. Development of effective and efficient finning ability takes practice, and is helped by training, as efficient technique is not always intuitive or obvious.

Fins that are too heavy or buoyant affect the diver's trim. Neutral or slightly negative fins are considered most generally suitable. Ankle weights tend to hold the fins down when there is no excess air in the boots, and the mass of the fin and ankle weight must be accelerated for every fin stroke, which does not add to propulsive force, as only the accelerated water provides thrust, and only when accelerated in a useful direction. Reducing the available volume in the lower leg of the suit limits air volume without adding significant mass, and gaiters can also streamline the fastest moving part of the diver.

A good fit of the foot pocket helps with efficiency and is important for comfort. Closed heel fins are more effective at transferring the power of the leg to the fin than open heel foot pockets, but are less adaptable to foot and boot size, and may be more difficult to put on.

Simple stiff paddle fins are effective for the widest range of strokes, but are not as efficient for thrust production as long fins and monofins, and may be more demanding on the muscles and joints of the legs than more flexible styles.

Split fins, hinged fins and other attempts to lower the muscular and joint load on parts of the legs are not completely effective at eliminating cramps, there is necessarily a muscular work input required to produce thrust.

Monofins are relatively efficient at thrust production for linear motion, but are incompatible with most finning techniques, and when optimised for speed or acceleration, are generally relatively bulky and fragile, and are incompatible with most finning maneuvering techniques, which involve simultaneous different motions for each foot.

== Propulsion ==
Finning for propulsion involves methods of producing thrust with the intention of linear motion through the water on the long axis of the body.

There is a trade-off between speed and energy efficiency for all styles of finning, as drag is proportional to the square of the speed, the drag coefficient, which is affected by streamlining, and the frontal area, which depends largely on trim.

For a given value of drag, diver effort can be minimised by using the kick stroke and fin configuration that has the most efficient conversion of muscular work into thrust. Speed records show that monofins and dolphin kick are the most efficient for propulsion, followed by long, thin and highly elastic-bladed bifins with close-fitting foot pockets.

=== Flutter kick ===
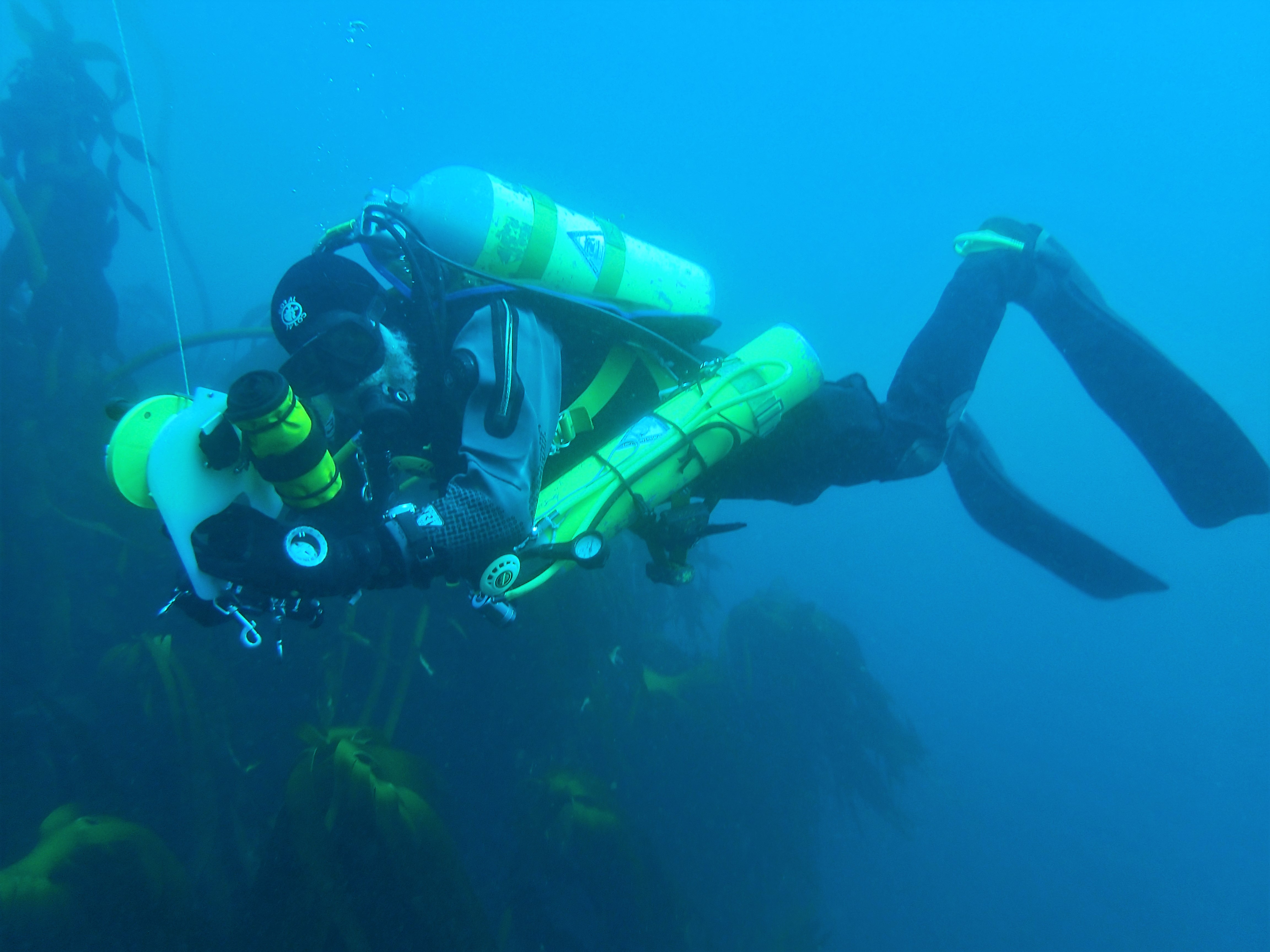
Flutter kick is suitable for long distances at moderate speeds, and long elastic blades are more efficient for converting power into thrust.

Flutter kick is the alternating up and down motion of the legs, either from the hips or as the more restricted movement of the modified flutter kick, and is the most frequently used finning technique. Flutter kick is easy to learn and is the technique most commonly taught to learner divers, but is often applied badly, where the fin is moved in a "pedalling motion", which reduces the effort required to move the feet, at the cost of making the effort largely ineffective for propulsion. Almost all types of fin are at least reasonably effective for flutter kick, with the exception of the monofin.

For maximum power from the flutter kick the full length of the leg from the hip is used, as kicking from the hips uses the largest muscle groups Having one stronger or leading leg tends to propel the diver in a curve, particularly if there is no visual feedback.

Flutter kick is effective for acceleration and sustained speed, particularly over moderate to long distances. It is a strong technique and can produce high thrust, so it is effective when swimming against a current. Sustained moderate to high speeds increase gas consumption due to high energy output.

Forward movement through the water has been used as a substitute for neutral buoyancy, particularly before buoyancy compensators became available, and still is used for this purpose. The flutter kick has a tendency to kick up silt from the bottom from downwash, but is good for avoiding contact with a nearby vertical surface, as when swimming along a wall.

==== Modified flutter kick ====
Modified flutter kick, or high flutter kick, is an adaptation where the knees are bent, so that the fins point slightly upwards, and is suitable for confined spaces and silty conditions, as the thrust is not directed downwards.

=== Dolphin kick ===
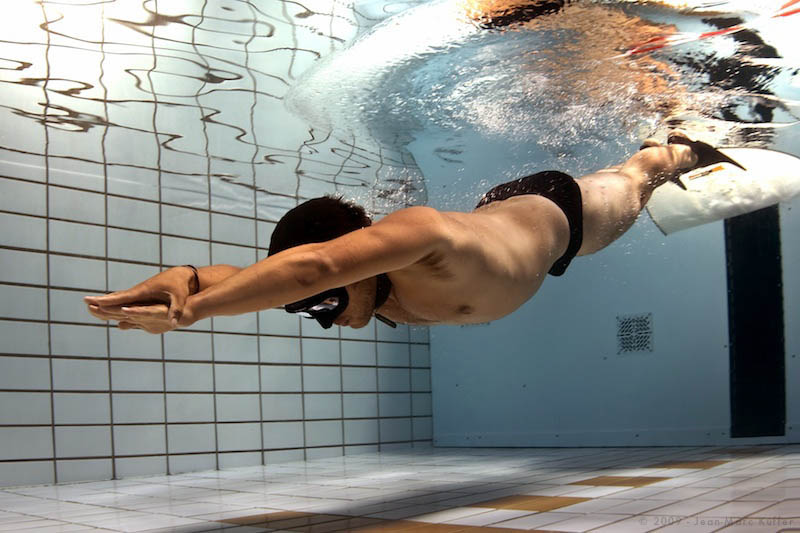
Efficient dolphin kick technique using a monofin

Dolphin kick is the technique where both legs are moved up and down together, and may be done with paired fins or a monofin, which has foot pockets for both feet attached to a single wide blade. Maximum transfer of power from the swimmer to the fin requires a close fit which prevents relative movement between foot and fin. This is less critical for divers with a breathing gas supply. The dolphin kick is the only technique that applies to the monofin. Dolphin kick can also be used with paired fins (bifins), but does not reach the same level of efficiency. Nevertheless, it is a powerful technique and capable of producing high thrust, but this high thrust has a high energy cost when applied by sub-optimal fins and to high-drag scuba diving equipment, so it is often only used for short bursts by scuba divers. The muscle groups used for high efficiency dolphin kick technique are different from those used for other finning techniques. Efficient dolphin kick relies to a large extent on abdominal and back muscles, which are not used much in the other kicks. The efficiency of this style is also improved by extending the arms in front of the swimmer and tucking the head down for reduced drag.

=== Frog kick ===
The frog kick is a propulsion kick used particularly by cave divers, wreck divers, and those who practice the Doing It Right philosophy. It is similar to the swimming action of a frog or the leg action in the breaststroke style of swimming.

Frog kick involves the simultaneous and laterally mirrored motion of both legs together, approximately parallel to the frontal plane. The description assumes that the diver is trimmed horizontal and intends to swim horizontally.

- The power stroke starts with the feet drawn up with knees bent and fins approximately horizontal. The fins are rotated outwards with the soles facing backwards, and toes outwards, then the legs are extended so the fins push water backwards, while extending the ankles to close the gap between the fins, to push backwards a bit more. Incomplete ankle rotation will cause thrust to be exerted partly upwards which would tend to push the feet down.
- The power stroke is followed by a glide, while the diver is in the most streamlined position with the legs nearly straight and the fins feathered. This takes advantage of the momentum produced by the power stroke to gain some distance and rest before starting the next kick, as the recovery stroke will increase drag.
- The recovery stroke pulls the feathered fins towards the centre of mass by flexing the hips, knees and ankles, while rotating the fin blades horizontally to minimize drag. The recovery stroke causes drag by bending the lower legs across and against the flow, so should be delayed until the speed drops and forward motion has slowed. Forward speed varies more during the stages of a frog kick than the relatively constant speed of the flutter kick.

The frog kick pushes water backwards, and to a lesser degree upwards, rather than backwards with alternating up and down component, as with the flutter kick and dolphin kick also used by divers. The dolphin and flutter kicks can be efficiently performed without interruption, but the frog kick must allow a low drag glide period or energy will be wasted.

==== Modified frog kick ====
Modified frog kick, also known as high frog kick, short frog kick, and bent knee cave diver kick, uses smaller movements, mostly of the lower leg and foot, which makes it suitable for use in confined spaces, as it is less likely to damage the environment, but it produces limited thrust It is economical on air consumption over time due to a low energy requirement, and is suitable for relaxed cruising at low speeds and over silt. It is a preferred technique in cave diving. The modified frog kick arches the back and retains slightly bent knees during the power stroke, which keeps the thrust further away from the bottom when swimming above silt.

==== Application ====
Because of the direction of thrust is mostly in line with the diver, or slightly upwards, it is suitable for situations where disturbing the silt on the bottom can cause dramatic loss in visibility, such as inside wrecks and caves, and at any other time when the diver needs to swim close to a silty substrate. Some divers will use it as their standard kick even in more forgiving environments, as the resting position is identical for other kicks that increase underwater mobility, such as the backwards kick and the helicopter turn.

The glide part of the stroke is essential for reasonable efficiency, so to be efficient frog kick requires good buoyancy control, and it is not efficient against a current. Basic frog kick is a stroke with wide action, and is unsuitable for use close to a wall or in narrow spaces. Use of frog kick can reduce gas consumption if speed is not critical.

The muscle combinations used are different from those used for flutter kick, and alternating between the two can reduce the chances of leg cramps.

Most styles of fin can be used with the frog-kick. Only monofins are totally unsuitable. Frog kick is also usefully effective when used without fins. One of the advantages of the frog kick is that it can be used effectively with short, stiff fins, with little blade angle offset, which are also effective for the backward kick and helicopter turns and general maneuvering in confined spaces, but less efficient for the flutter kick and continuous moderate to high speed finning.

Frog kick allows the diver to flare the fins at any time during the stroke to slow down, and can be converted to a backward kick or helicopter turn from some points of the stroke, which can allow more precise maneuvering at close quarters. Frog kick is suitable for relaxed cruising at low speeds

=== Scissor kick ===
This is an asymmetrical stroke also known as split kick, and when rotated 90° at the surface, as side kick. It combines characteristics of the flutter kick, in that the stroke is up and down, and the frog kick, in that most of the power is generated in the closing part of the stroke. At the surface the diver can use the same action rotated 90° as a side kick. It is a powerful thruster, but not very fast. When used as a side kick, one leg performs the upper part of the kick, and the other does the lower part. On the preparatory stroke the upper leg is bent forward at the hip and the lower leg backwards at the hip and the knee. On the power stroke the legs are straightened and brought together with the fins coming together with straight legs at the end of the stroke. It is not convenient to alternate every stroke, but legs can be changed after a few strokes if preferred. The same leg action is used underwater with the body trimmed face down. As for the frog kick, a glide phase may be inserted before the next preparatory stroke.

=== Backward kick ===
Also known as reverse kick, back kick, back finning, reverse fin and reverse frog kick. The backward kick is used for holding position or backing away when too close while taking photos or approaching a reef or other divers, backing out of confined spaces, maintaining distance from the shotline during decompression stops and similar maneuvers. Reverse kick is generally considered an advanced skill, and is not suited to all styles of fin construction, as it requires fairly stiff bladed paddle fins to be reasonably effective. It is a relatively difficult technique to master, and many divers cannot do it at all, and rely on sculling with the arms for these maneuvers. The movements are larger than those of the modified frog and flutter kicks, and the fins are more likely to contact the surroundings in a confined space.

Each stroke starts with the legs extended backward at full stretch, heels together and toes pointed. The power stroke flexes the feet to extend the fins sideways, with feet splayed outward as much as possible. Feet remain close to right angles to the legs, and the diver pulls the fins toward the body by flexing the legs at the knees and hips in a motion that propels the diver backward. Part of the thrust is due to flow across the width of the fins, as they are swept outward and forward. The diver then points the fins backwards to reduce drag, puts heels together, and extends the legs to the start position.

== Maneuvering ==
Maneuvering with fins generally involves production of thrust at an angle to the centre-line for forward motion, and usually a relatively small and controlled thrust for a short period. Fatigue or musculo-skeletal stress is seldom an issue with maneuvering.

=== Helicopter turns ===
Sometimes also called sculling kick, the helicopter turn is useful for turning around and adjusting position in the water without using the hands.

The technique has been described as half frog kick and half reverse kick, using one leg for each. Thrust should be balanced in the axial direction and maximised in the transverse direction for best efficiency. A helicopter turn should rotate the diver about a vertical axis without moving away from the initial position. A variation uses mostly ankle action sculling for relatively fine and precise rotation on a vertical axis.

=== Rolls ===
Rotation about the longitudinal horizontal axis is called rolling, and is can be performed by using opposed leg motions similar to those used for flutter kick, but with the fins spread a bit wider apart and with the fins held straighter, to concentrate thrust vertically on the power stroke, and feathered for the return stroke.

==== Backward and forward rolls ====
It is not often necessary to do a full backward or forward somersault underwater, but when it is necessary, it is often easier to do by coordinated arm movements, which allow a tighter rotation than finning for most people. Nevertheless, it is possible to loop forwards or backwards using only the fins for propulsion. The tightness of the loop when finning depends to a large extent on how tightly the diver can arch over forwards or backwards and how well they can direct fin thrust to provide the turning moment. Changes in attitude from vertical to horizontal, and vice versa, and recovery from an inversion are more common, and involve similar techniques.

=== Surface sculling ===
This is a fin stroke for maintaining position and attitude at the surface, particularly while waiting for a pickup or taking a compass bearing. The fins are sculled from side to side using opening and closing motions of the legs, and the ankles rotated as best suited to the thrust needed to turn or hold the diver steady. It is similar to treading water, but without needing to bend and straighten the legs. Fine control and steadying of which way the diver faces can be achieved.

== Hovering and stabilising attitude ==
It is sometimes useful or necessary to compensate for instability due to misaligned centre of gravity and centre of buoyancy or slight negative buoyancy. A well-trimmed diver should be stable in some attitudes, but may require dynamic compensation to retain an attitude which is temporarily desirable for some transient reason, such as focusing a camera on a specific subject, maneuvering in restricted spaces or performing some other task. This can often be done by a technique similar to surface sculling, using small leg and ankle movements.
