= Jack Sieg =

American swimmer (1914–1968)

Personal information
- Born: December 10, 1914 Kansas City, Missouri, United States
- Died: December 21, 1968 (aged 54) Oklahoma, United States

Sport
- Sport: Swimming
- Club: University of Iowa
- Coach: Dave Armbruster (U. Iowa)

Jack George Sieg (December 10, 1914 – December 21, 1968) was an American swimmer who used the butterfly stroke in 1935, developed by his coach Dave Armbruster. He competed for the University of Iowa and first used the stroke in a breaststroke leg of a medley relay February 25, 1935.

== See also ==
- History of swimming
