= Flutter kick =

Kicking movement used in both swimming and calisthenics

The flutter kick is a kicking movement used in both swimming and calisthenics.

== Swimming ==
In swimming, the flutter kick refers to an alternating up and down movement of the legs. (Note: Some lateral motion is also present, usually in the direction the body is rotated.) It is seen in front crawl and backstroke. The downbeat refers to the portion of each individual kick where the leg moves downwards, and the upbeat refers to the repositioning of the leg upwards. In front crawl, the flutter kick is sometimes referred to as the front crawl kick, and in backstroke it is sometimes called the backstroke kick.

=== Phases ===
The flutter kick in front crawl

In front crawl, the downbeat of each kick is initiated by the simultaneous action of bending the knee and flexing the hip to push down on the water with the thigh. The knee then extends forcefully, pushing the lower leg against the water until the leg is straight. The ankle then extends, pushing the foot into the water until it is inline with the rest of the leg. When the knee extends for the downbeat, it also has the effect of lifting the thigh and initiating the upbeat. Once the leg is straight, flexion at the hip lifts it up to be horizontal with the surface of the water, where it is in position to initiate another downbeat.

The flutter kick in backstroke

In backstroke the movement is similar, but as the swimmer is on their back, their legs face upward. This means the downbeat of the front crawl kick corresponds to the upbeat of the backstroke kick, and that the upbeat of the front crawl kick corresponds to the downbeat of the backstroke kick.

=== Effects ===
==== Propulsion ====
The kick allows the swimmer to propel themselves forward in the water though pushing back on the water with their feet. In his book Swimming Fastest, Ernest Maglischo says that the downbeat of the front crawl kick is "undoubtedly the most propulsive phase" and opines that the upbeat is probably not propulsive at all. This corresponds with the upbeat being the most propulsive phase in the backstroke kick.

Research suggests that in front crawl, the power of the flutter kick produces the strongest propulsive force when no additional propulsion is present, and then decreases relatively proportionally to further increases in propulsion.

In experienced competitive swimmers, the flutter kick can account for approximately 10–30% of propulsion during the front crawl, with the rest being generated by the arm stroke.

==== Rotation and stabilisation ====
In Swimming Fastest, Maglischo writes that the lateral movements of the kick "probably" contribute to rotation and stabilisation in front crawl, aiding the swimmer in maintaining a straight course. Some researchers argued that in front crawl, middle-to-long distance swimmers should use the flutter kick for stabilisation only, saying that the oxygen usage for a propulsive kick outweighs the potential increase in speed over longer distances.

=== Variation ===
==== Depth ====
Maglischo opined that increasing the depth of the kick contributes to propulsion and stabilisation but also increases drag. Kicking with a depth of 30 cm produced more propulsion than kicking with a depth of 15 cm, and research suggests that high level competitive swimmers kick at a depth of around 40 cm. (Note: Referring to swimmers who compete at a national or international level)

==== Foot angle ====
Research suggests that a greater pitch angle (angle between the horizontal and the axis of the foot) increases propulsion by allowing the foot to push back on the water more. Athletes can increase this angle by improving their plantar flexion flexibility.

=== Training ===
The flutter kick can be practised with a kickboard. Maglischo argues that training the flutter kick using a kickboard may neglect the lateral movements of the kick and hence not improve the rotation and stabilisation aspects.

== Underwater diving ==
The flutter kick used with swimfins can be a powerful propulsion technique, and is used by scuba divers and freedivers underwater and at the surface, but there are other finning techniques more appropriate to some underwater environments and some types of fin. Divers in a confined environment or where silting may be a problem may use a modified flutter kick or frog kick, done entirely with bent knees, pushing water up and behind the diver to avoid stirring up sediment on the bottom.

== Calisthenics ==
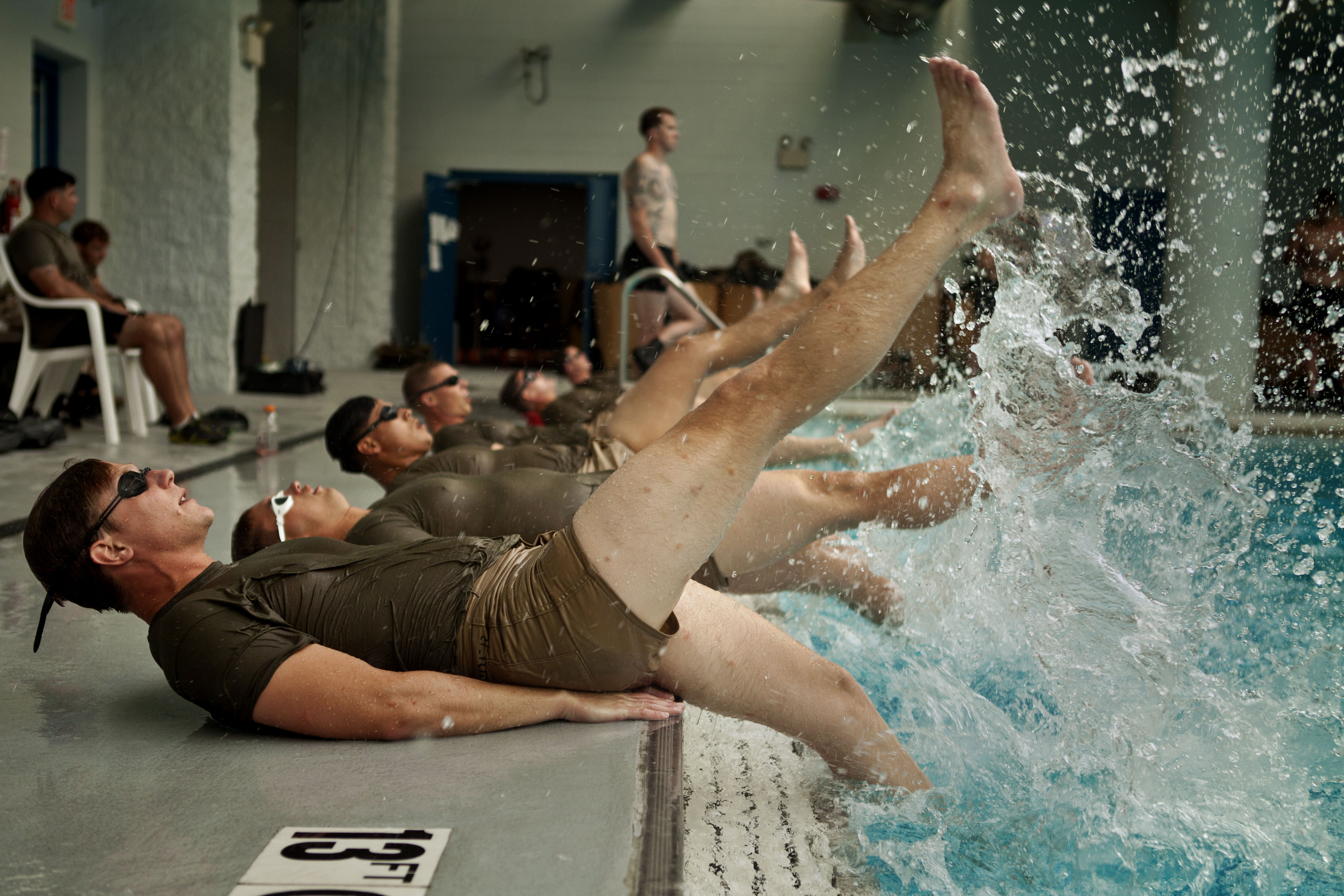
Military personnel doing flutter kicks on the edge of a pool

The calisthenics version of the flutter kick is often used as an intensive training tool in the military. They help to develop the hip flexors, abdominal muscles and leg muscles. Flutter kicks are a four-count exercise. Starting position is lying flat on the back with the feet and head approximately 6 inches (15 cm) off the ground. Hands are under the buttocks to support the lower back. Count one: raise the left leg to a 45-degree angle, keeping the right leg stationary. Count two: raise the right leg off the ground to a 45-degree angle while, at the same time, moving the left leg to the starting position. Counts three and four are repetitions of the same movements. Legs must be locked, with toes pointing away from the body.
