= Dolphin kick =

Swimming style

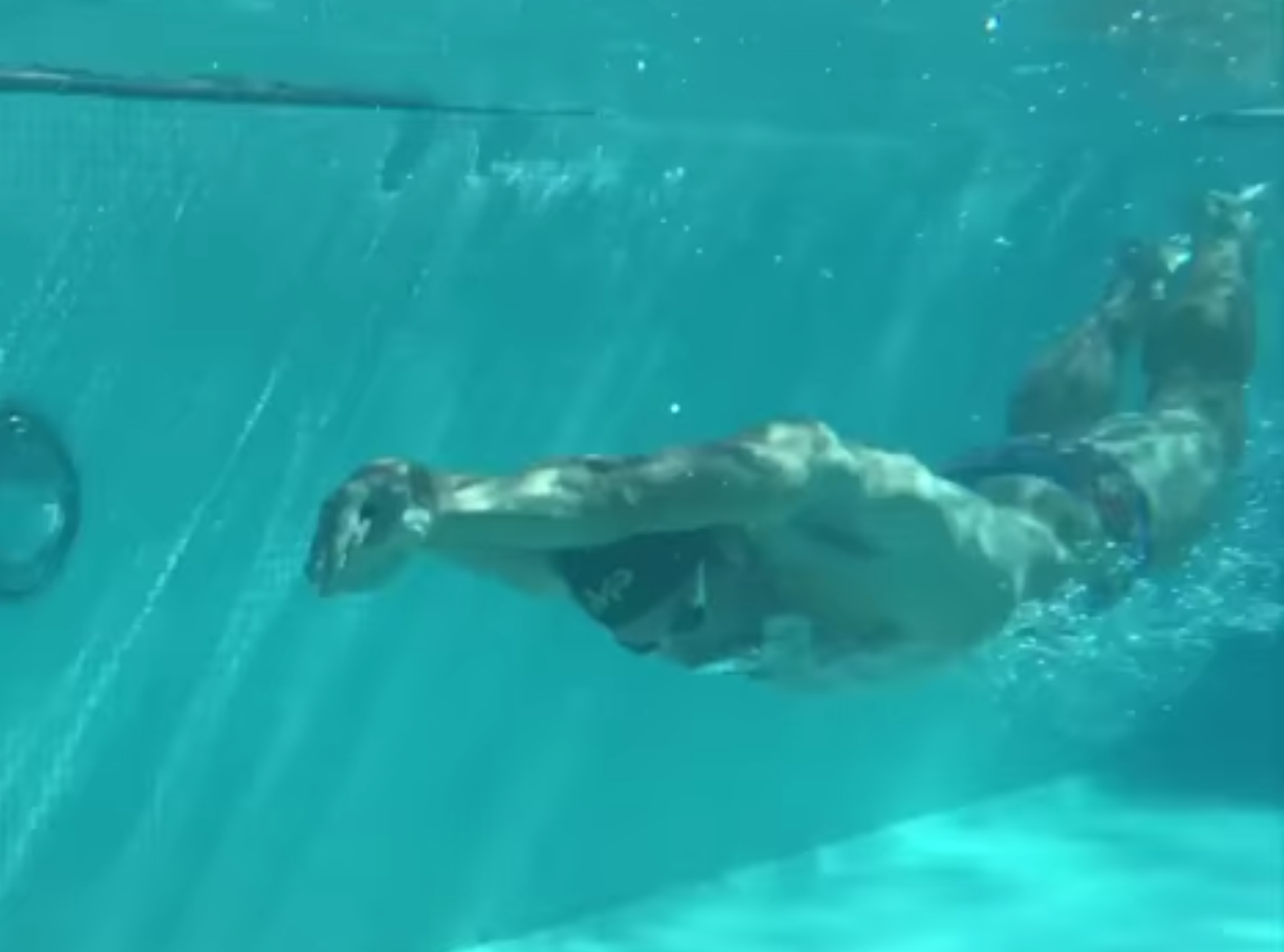
Swimmer Michael Phelps performing a dolphin kick.

The dolphin kick is a kicking movement used in swimming. It is frequently used by competitive swimmers during entry and turns, and as part of the butterfly stroke.

== Description ==
The dolphin kick is named for its resemblance to the motions made by a swimming dolphin. It is typically used in competitive swimming immediately after a swimmer enters the water or after turns. The swimmer performs the kick by moving both legs together, vertically, which sends a wave through the swimmer's body, propelling them forward.

The stroke is useful in competitive swimming for its physical properties: it reduces drag while providing a significant amount of thrust, with comparatively low physical exertion.

In competitive breaststroke swimming, a single dolphin kick is allowed before the breaststroke pullout at the start and each turn, and it must be performed before the first breaststroke kick. This kick should occur after the swimmer leaves the wall and before the hands turn inward at the widest part of the stroke. Additional dolphin kicks during the swim are prohibited and can result in disqualification.

== History ==
The dolphin kick gained prominence during the 1988 Olympics, where many competitors used the dolphin kick extensively at their starts in the 100m backstroke final. In response, the FINA limited the use of the dolphin kick to 15 meters.

== Technique and training ==
A growing body of research has explored the biomechanics and performance characteristics of the dolphin kick, emphasizing the importance of kick timing, undulation, and vertical toe speed for propulsion. Dryland exercises, core training, resisted swimming, and technique-focused sets are commonly used to enhance kick performance.
