= Porpoise (scuba gear) =

Australian scuba manufacturer

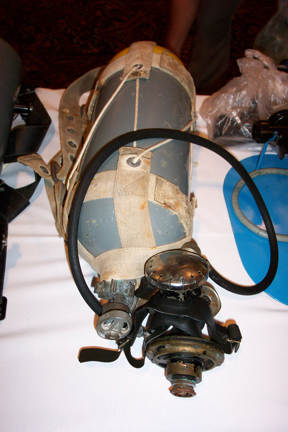
An example of the world's first commercially available, single hose SCUBA unit designed and manufactured by Ted Eldred in 1952.

Porpoise is a tradename for scuba developed by Ted Eldred in Australia and made there from the late 1940s onwards. The first Porpoise was a closed circuit oxygen rebreather, and the following models were all single hose open circuit regulators.

== Rebreather ==
The Porpoise oxygen rebreather was developed by Ted Eldred in the late 1940s and early 1950s. Some were made and used for sport diving, but they did not go into full production. It was worn on the back without a casing. The bag was between the canister and valve assembly and the diver's back. It had two wide breathing tubes running to a mouthpiece, which had a shutoff valve to keep water out when it was not in the mouth. It appeared in three versions: MK1, MK2, MK3. It had a special valve that both breathing tubes ran through that was activated by surrounding pressure; when the diver went deeper than was safe for pure oxygen it restricted (not stopped) the supply of breathing gas, to warn the diver to go to shallower depth. (Before open-circuit scuba was readily available in Australia, many Australian sport divers used war-surplus Siebe Gorman Salvus rebreathers.)

== Single-hose open-circuit scuba regulator ==
This was the first single-hose open-circuit scuba made in the world. Ted Eldred in Melbourne in Australia started designing it in 1948 to "design around" the Cousteau-Gagnan aqua-lung patent, and to get rid of air supply restrictions that affected early Cousteau-Gagnan-type aqua-lungs. He started making it commercially in 1952. The Royal Australian Navy adopted it. It was the origin of single-hose scuba regulators. It was much used by Australian scuba divers. The picture shows the CA-1, a set with one cylinder with its valve at the bottom, strapped directly to the back with rucksack-type straps without backpack plate or buoyancy aid, with a single-hose regulator-mouthpiece which could be strapped in. The tank was inverted so that the diver could reach the regulator mounted reserve handle. The head strap was intended to keep the demand valve from falling well below the diver, if dropped from the mouth. The high-pressure regulator screwed into the side of the cylinder valve like welding equipment of today; there was no A-clamp. Versions of it were made for the Australian Navy until 1976, and the last one known to be sold to the public was sold in that year. About 12,000 Porpoise units of all models were produced. About 50 Porpoises still exist. Only a few of these early models are known today, the rarest being the CA-2, made for use with two tanks.

== See also ==
- Rebreather – Portable apparatus to recycle breathing gas
- Diving regulator – Mechanism that controls the pressure of a breathing gas supply for diving
- Scuba set – Self-contained underwater breathing apparatus
