= Diving regulator =

Mechanism that controls the pressure of a breathing gas supply for diving

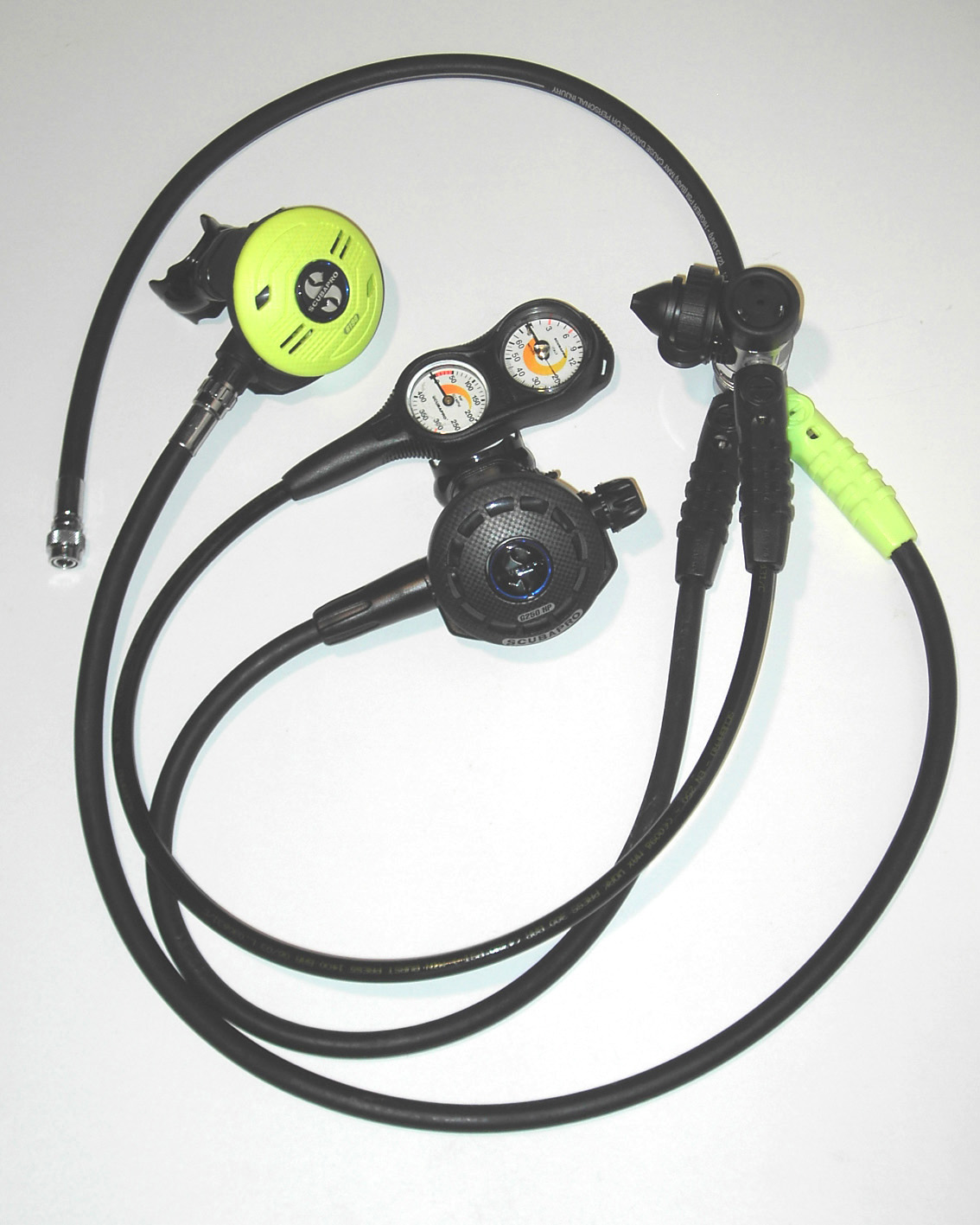
- Diving regulator: The most familiar type is the single-hose open circuit scuba regulator, with first and second stages, low pressure inflator hose and submersible pressure gauge
- Other names: Demand valve
- Uses: Reduces pressurized breathing gas to ambient pressure and delivers it to the diver
- Inventor: Manuel Théodore Guillaumet (1838), Benoît Rouquayrol (1860), Jacques-Yves Cousteau and Émile Gagnan (1942), Ted Eldred (1950)
- Related items: Lightweight demand helmet Full-face mask Diving cylinder Buoyancy compensator

A diving regulator or underwater diving regulator is a pressure regulator that controls the pressure of breathing gas for underwater diving. The most commonly recognised application is to reduce pressurized breathing gas to ambient pressure and deliver it to the diver, but there are also other types of gas pressure regulator used for diving applications. The gas may be air or one of a variety of specially blended breathing gases. The gas may be supplied from a scuba cylinder carried by the diver, in which case it is called a scuba regulator, or via a hose from a compressor or high-pressure storage cylinders at the surface in surface-supplied diving. A gas pressure regulator has one or more valves in series which reduce pressure from the source, and use the downstream pressure as feedback to control the delivered pressure, or the upstream pressure as feedback to prevent excessive flow rates, lowering the pressure at each stage.

The terms "regulator" and "demand valve" (DV) are often used interchangeably, but a demand valve is the final stage pressure-reduction regulator that delivers gas only while the diver is inhaling and reduces the gas pressure to approximately ambient. In single-hose demand regulators, the demand valve is either held in the diver's mouth by a mouthpiece or attached to the full-face mask or helmet. In twin-hose regulators the demand valve is included in the body of the regulator which is usually attached directly to the cylinder valve or manifold outlet, with a remote mouthpiece supplied at ambient pressure.

A pressure-reduction regulator is used to control the delivery pressure of the gas supplied to a free-flow helmet or full-face mask, in which the flow is continuous, to maintain the downstream pressure which is limited by the ambient pressure of the exhaust and the flow resistance of the delivery system (mainly the umbilical and exhaust valve) and not much influenced by the breathing of the diver. Diving rebreather systems may also use regulators to control the flow of fresh gas, and demand valves, known as automatic diluent valves, to maintain the volume in the breathing loop during descent. Gas reclaim systems and built-in breathing systems (BIBS) use a different kind of regulator to control the flow of exhaled gas to the return hose and through the topside reclaim system, or to the outside of the hyperbaric chamber, these are of the back-pressure regulator class.

The performance of a regulator is measured by the cracking pressure and added mechanical work of breathing, and the capacity to deliver breathing gas at peak inspiratory flow rate at high ambient pressures without excessive pressure drop, and without excessive dead space. For some cold water diving applications the capacity to deliver high flow rates at low ambient temperatures without jamming due to regulator freezing is important.

== Purpose ==
The diving regulator is a mechanism which reduces the pressure of the supply of breathing gas and provides it to the diver at approximately ambient pressure. The gas may be supplied on demand, when the diver inhales, or as a constant flow past the diver inside the helmet or mask, from which the diver uses what is necessary, while the remainder goes to waste.

The gas may be provided directly to the diver, or to a rebreather circuit, to make up for used gas and volume changes due to depth variations. Gas supply may be from a high-pressure scuba cylinder carried by the diver, or from a surface supply through a hose connected to a compressor or high pressure storage system.

== Types ==
An open circuit demand valve provides gas flow only while the diver inhales, a free flow regulator provides a constant flow rate at the delivery pressure, reclaim and built-in-breathing-systems regulators allow exhaust outflow only during exhalation. Rebreathers use demand regulators to make up a volume deficit in the loop, and may use constant mass flow regulators to refresh the oxygen content of the loop gas mixture. A scuba diving regulator is used to supply a scuba diver from a scuba cylinder, while a diving helmet demand valve may supply gas from surface supply or a bailout scuba cylinder.

=== Open circuit demand valve ===
A demand valve detects the pressure drop when the diver starts inhaling and supplies the diver with a breath of gas at ambient pressure. When the diver stops inhaling, the demand valve closes to stop the flow. The demand valve has a chamber, which in normal use contains breathing gas at ambient pressure, which is connected to a bite-grip mouthpiece, a full-face mask, or a diving helmet, either direct coupled or connected by a flexible low-pressure hose. On one side of the chamber is a flexible diaphragm to sense the pressure difference between the gas in the chamber on one side and the surrounding water on the other side, and control the operation of the valve which supplies pressurised gas into the chamber.

This is done by a mechanical system linking the diaphragm to a valve which is opened to an extent proportional to the displacement of the diaphragm from the closed position. The pressure difference between the inside of the mouthpiece and the ambient pressure outside the diaphragm required to open the valve is known as the cracking pressure. This cracking pressure difference is usually negative relative to ambient, but may be slightly positive on a positive pressure regulator (a regulator that maintains a pressure inside the mouthpiece, mask or helmet, which is slightly greater than the ambient pressure). Once the valve has opened, gas flow should continue at the smallest stable pressure difference reasonably practicable while the diver inhales, and should stop as soon as gas flow stops. Several mechanisms have been devised to provide this function, some of them extremely simple and robust, and others somewhat more complex, but more sensitive to small pressure changes. The diaphragm is protected by a cover with holes or slits through which outside water can enter freely. This cover reduces sensitivity of the diaphragm to water turbulence and dynamic pressure due to movement, which might otherwise trigger gas flow when it is not needed.

When the diver starts to inhale, the removal of gas from the casing lowers the pressure inside the chamber, and the external water pressure moves the diaphragm inwards operating a lever which lifts the valve off its seat, releasing gas into the chamber. The inter-stage gas, at about 8 to 10 bars (120 to 150 psi) over ambient pressure, expands through the valve orifice as its pressure is reduced to ambient and supplies the diver with more gas to breathe. When the diver stops inhaling the chamber fills until the external pressure is balanced, the diaphragm returns to its rest position and the lever releases the valve to be closed by the valve spring and gas flow stops.

When the diver exhales, one-way valves made from a flexible air-tight material flex outwards under the pressure of the exhalation, letting gas escape from the chamber. They close, making a seal, when the exhalation stops and the pressure inside the chamber reduces to ambient pressure.

The vast majority of demand valves are used on open circuit breathing apparatus, which means that the exhaled gas is discharged into the surrounding environment and lost. Reclaim valves can be fitted to helmets to allow the used gas to be returned to the surface for reuse after removing the carbon dioxide and making up the oxygen. This process, referred to as "push-pull", is technologically complex and expensive and is only used for deep commercial diving on heliox mixtures, where the saving on helium compensates for the expense and complications of the system, and for diving in contaminated water, where the gas is not reclaimed, but the system reduces the risk of contaminated water leaking into the helmet through an exhaust valve.

=== Open circuit free-flow regulator ===
These are generally used in surface supply diving with free-flow masks and helmets. They are usually a large high-flow rated industrial gas regulator that is manually controlled at the gas panel on the surface to the pressure required to provide the desired flow rate to the diver. Free flow is not normally used on scuba equipment as the high gas flow rates are inefficient and wasteful.

In constant-flow regulators the pressure regulator provides a constant reduced pressure, which provides gas flow to the diver, which may be to some extent controlled by an adjustable orifice controlled by the diver. These are the earliest type of breathing set flow control. The diver must physically open and close the adjustable supply valve to regulate flow. Constant flow valves in an open circuit breathing set consume gas less economically than demand valve regulators because gas flows even when it is not needed, and must flow at the rate required for peak inhalation. Before 1939, self contained diving and industrial open circuit breathing sets with constant-flow regulators were designed by Le Prieur, but did not get into general use due to very short dive duration. Design complications resulted from the need to put the second-stage flow control valve where it could be easily operated by the diver.

=== Reclaim regulators ===
The cost of breathing gas containing a high fraction of helium is a significant part of the cost of deep diving operations, and can be reduced by recovering the breathing gas for recycling. A reclaim helmet is provided with a return line in the diver's umbilical, and exhaled gas is discharged to this hose through a reclaim regulator, which ensures that gas pressure in the helmet cannot fall below the ambient pressure. The gas is processed at the surface in the helium reclaim system by filtering, scrubbing and boosting into storage cylinders until needed. The oxygen content may be adjusted when appropriate. The same principle is used in built-in breathing systems used to vent oxygen-rich treatment gases from a hyperbaric chamber, though those gases are generally not reclaimed. A diverter valve is provided to allow the diver to manually switch to open circuit if the reclaim valve malfunctions, and an underpressure flood valve allows water to enter the helmet to avoid a squeeze if the reclaim valve fails suddenly, allowing the diver time to switch to open circuit without injury. Reclaim valves for deep diving may use two stages to give smoother flow and lower work of breathing. The reclaim regulator works on a similar principle to the demand regulator, in that it allows flow only when the pressure difference between the interior of the helmet and the ambient water opens the valve, but uses the upstream over-pressure to activate the valve, where the demand valve uses downstream underpressure.

Reclaim regulators are also sometimes used for hazmat diving to reduce the risk of backflow of contaminated water through the exhaust valves into the helmet. In this application there would not be an underpressure flood valve, but the pressure differences and the squeeze risk are relatively low. The breathing gas in this application would usually be air and would not actually be recycled.

=== Built-in breathing systems ===
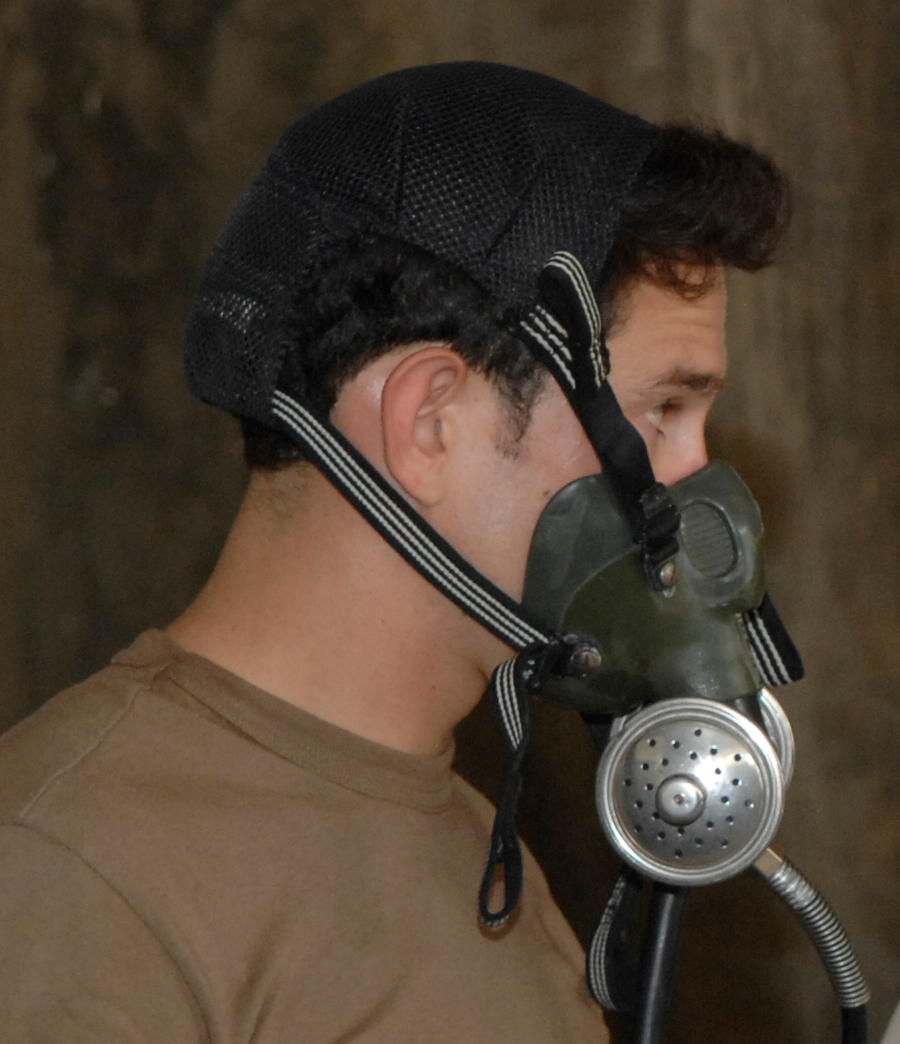
Side view of BIBS mask supported by straps

BIBS regulators for hyperbaric chambers have a two-stage system at the diver similar to reclaim helmets, though for this application the outlet regulator dumps the exhaled gas through an outlet hose to the atmosphere outside the chamber.

These are systems used to supply breathing gas on demand in a chamber which is at a pressure greater than the ambient pressure outside the chamber. The pressure difference between chamber and external ambient pressure makes it possible to exhaust the exhaled gas to the external environment, but the flow must be controlled so that only exhaled gas is vented through the system, and it does not drain the contents of the chamber to the outside. This is achieved by using a controlled exhaust valve which opens when a slight over-pressure relative to the chamber pressure on the exhaust diaphragm moves the valve mechanism against a spring. When this over-pressure is dissipated by the gas flowing out through the exhaust hose, the spring returns this valve to the closed position, cutting off further flow, and conserving the chamber atmosphere. A negative or zero pressure difference over the exhaust diaphragm will keep it closed. The exhaust diaphragm is exposed to the chamber pressure on one side, and exhaled gas pressure in the oro-nasal mask on the other side. The supply of gas for inhalation is through a demand valve which works on the same principles as a regular diving demand valve second stage. Like any other breathing apparatus, the dead space must be limited to minimise carbon dioxide buildup in the mask.

In some cases the outlet suction must be limited and a back-pressure regulator may be required. This would usually be the case for use in a saturation system. Use for oxygen therapy and surface decompression on oxygen would not generally need a back-pressure regulator. When an externally vented BIBS is used at low chamber pressure, a vacuum assist may be necessary to keep the exhalation backpressure down to provide an acceptable work of breathing.

The major application for this type of BIBS is supply of breathing gas with a different composition to the chamber atmosphere to occupants of a hyperbaric chamber where the chamber atmosphere is controlled, and contamination by the BIBS gas would be a problem. This is common in therapeutic decompression, and hyperbaric oxygen therapy, where a higher partial pressure of oxygen in the chamber would constitute an unacceptable fire hazard, and would require frequent ventilation of the chamber to keep the partial pressure within acceptable limits. Frequent ventilation is noisy and expensive, but can be used in an emergency.

=== Rebreather regulators ===
Rebreather systems used for diving recycle most of the breathing gas, but are not based on a demand valve system for their primary function. Instead, the breathing loop is carried by the diver and remains at ambient pressure while in use. Regulators may be used in scuba rebreathers to make up a deficit in loop gas volume, and to provide oxygen-rich gas to compensate for metabolic use.

The automatic diluent valve (ADV) is used in a rebreather to add gas to the loop to compensate automatically for volume reduction due to pressure increase with greater depth or to make up gas lost from the system by the diver exhaling through the nose while clearing the mask or as a method of flushing the loop. They are often provided with a purge button to allow manual flushing of the loop. The ADV is similar in concept and function to the open circuit demand valve and may use many similar components, but does not have an integral exhaust valve. An equivalent function to the exhaust valve is provided by the loop overpressure valve. Some passive semi-closed circuit rebreathers use the ADV to add gas to the loop to compensate for a portion of the gas discharged automatically during the breathing cycle as a way of maintaining a suitable oxygen concentration.

The bailout valve (BOV) is an open circuit demand valve built into a rebreather mouthpiece or other part of the breathing loop. It can be isolated while the diver is using the rebreather to recycle breathing gas, and opened, while at the same time isolating the breathing loop, when a problem causes the diver to bail out onto open circuit. The main distinguishing feature of the BOV is that the same mouthpiece is used for open and closed-circuit, and the diver does not have to shut the dive/surface valve (DSV), remove it from their mouth, and find and insert the bailout demand valve in order to bail out onto open circuit. Although costly, this reduction in critical steps makes the integrated BOV a significant safety advantage, particularly when there is a high partial pressure of carbon dioxide in the loop, as hypercapnia can make it difficult or impossible for the diver to hold their breath even for the short period required to swap mouthpieces.

Constant mass flow addition valves are used to supply a constant mass flow of fresh gas to an active type semi-closed rebreather to replenish the gas used by the diver and to maintain an approximately constant composition of the loop mix. Two main types are used: the fixed orifice and the adjustable orifice (usually a needle valve). The constant mass flow valve is usually supplied by a gas regulator that is isolated from the ambient pressure so that it provides an absolute pressure regulated output (not compensated for ambient pressure). This limits the depth range in which constant mass flow is possible through the orifice, but provides a relatively predictable gas mixture in the breathing loop. An over-pressure relief valve in the first stage is used to protect the output hose. Unlike most other diving gas supply regulators, constant mass flow orifices do not control the downstream pressure, but they do regulate the flow rate.

Manual and electronically controlled addition valves are used on manual and electronically controlled closed circuit rebreathers (mCCR, eCCR) to add oxygen to the loop to maintain oxygen partial pressure set-point. A manually or electronically controlled valve is used to release oxygen from the outlet of a standard scuba regulator first stage into the breathing loop. An over-pressure relief valve on the first stage is necessary to protect the hose in case of first stage leaks. Strictly speaking, these are not pressure regulators, they are flow control valves.

== History ==
The first recorded demand valve was invented in 1838 in France and forgotten in the next few years; another workable demand valve was not invented until 1860. On 14 November 1838, Dr. Manuel Théodore Guillaumet of Argentan, Normandy, France, filed a patent for a twin-hose demand regulator; the diver was provided air through pipes from the surface to a back mounted demand valve and from there to a mouthpiece. The exhaled gas was vented to the side of the head through a second hose. The apparatus was demonstrated to and investigated by a committee of the French Academy of Sciences:

On 19 June 1838, in London, William Edward Newton filed a patent (no. 7695: "Diving apparatus") for a diaphragm-actuated, twin-hose demand valve for divers. However, it is believed that Mr. Newton was merely filing a patent on behalf of Dr. Guillaumet.

In 1860 a mining engineer from Espalion (France), Benoît Rouquayrol, invented a demand valve with an iron air reservoir to let miners breathe in flooded mines. He called his invention régulateur ('regulator'). In 1864 Rouquayrol met the French Imperial Navy officer Auguste Denayrouze and they worked together to adapt Rouquayrol's regulator to diving. The Rouquayrol-Denayrouze apparatus was mass-produced with some interruptions from 1864 to 1965. As of 1865 it was acquired as a standard by the French Imperial Navy, but never was entirely accepted by the French divers because of a lack of safety and autonomy.

In 1926 Maurice Fernez and Yves Le Prieur patented a hand-controlled constant flow regulator (not a demand valve), which used a full-face mask (the air escaping from the mask at constant flow).

In 1937 and 1942 the French inventor, Georges Commeinhes from Alsace, patented a diving demand valve supplied with air from two gas cylinders through a full-face mask. Commeinhes died in 1944 during the liberation of Strasbourg and his invention was soon forgotten. The Commeinhes demand valve was an adaptation of the Rouquayoul-Denayrouze mechanism, not as compact as was the Cousteau-Gagnan apparatus.

It was not until December 1942 that the demand valve was developed to the form which gained widespread acceptance. This came about after French naval officer Jacques-Yves Cousteau and engineer Émile Gagnan met for the first time in Paris. Gagnan, employed at Air Liquide, had miniaturized and adapted a Rouquayrol-Denayrouze regulator used for gas generators following severe fuel restrictions due to the German occupation of France; Cousteau suggested it be adapted for diving, which in 1864 was its original purpose.

The single hose regulator, with a mouth held demand valve supplied with low pressure gas from the cylinder valve mounted first stage, was invented by Australian Ted Eldred in the early 1950s in response to patent restrictions and stock shortages of the Cousteau-Gagnan apparatus in Australia. In 1951 E. R. Cross invented the "Sport Diver," one of the first American-made single-hose regulators. Cross' version is based on the oxygen system used by pilots. Other early single-hose regulators developed during the 1950s include Rose Aviation's "Little Rose Pro," the "Nemrod Snark" (from Spain), and the Sportsways "Waterlung," designed by diving pioneer Sam LeCocq in 1958. In France, in 1955, a patent was taken out by Bronnec & Gauthier for a single hose regulator, later produced as the Cristal Explorer. The "Waterlung" would eventually become the first single-hose regulator to be widely adopted by the diving public. Over time, the convenience and performance of improved single hose regulators would make them the industry standard. Performance still continues to be improved by small increments, and adaptations have been applied to rebreather technology.

The single hose regulator was later adapted for surface supplied diving in lightweight helmets and full-face masks in the tradition of the Rouquayrol-Denayrouze equipment to economise on gas usage. By 1969 Kirby-Morgan had developed a full-face mask - the KMB-8 Bandmask - using a single hose regulator. This was developed into the Kirby-Morgan SuperLite-17B by 1976, making use of the neck dam seal invented by Joe Savoie.

Secondary (octopus) demand valves, submersible pressure gauges and low pressure inflator hoses were added to the first stage.

In 1994 a reclaim system was developed in a joint project by Kirby-Morgan and Divex to recover expensive helium mixes during deep operations.

== Mechanism and function ==
Both free-flow and demand regulators use mechanical feedback of the downstream pressure to control the opening of a valve which controls gas flow from the upstream, high-pressure side, to the downstream, low-pressure side of each stage. Flow capacity must be sufficient to allow the downstream pressure to be maintained at maximum demand, and sensitivity must be appropriate to deliver maximum required flow rate with a small variation in downstream pressure, and for a large variation in supply pressure. Open circuit scuba regulators must also deliver against a variable ambient pressure. They must be robust and reliable, as they are life-support equipment which must function in the relatively hostile seawater environment.

Diving regulators use mechanically operated valves. In most cases there is ambient pressure feedback to both first and second stage, except where this is avoided to allow constant mass flow through an orifice in a rebreather, which requires a constant upstream pressure.

The parts of a regulator are described here as the major functional groups in downstream order as following the gas flow from the diving cylinder to its final use.

=== Connection to the diving cylinder ===
The first-stage of the scuba regulator will usually be connected to the cylinder valve by one of two standard types of fittings. The CGA 850 connector, also known as an international connector, which uses a yoke clamp, or a DIN screw fitting. There are also European standards for scuba regulator connectors for gases other than air, and adapters to allow use of regulators with cylinder valves of a different connection type.

CGA 850 Yoke connectors (sometimes called A-clamps from their shape) are the most popular regulator connection in North America and several other countries. They clamp the high pressure inlet opening of the regulator against the outlet opening of the cylinder valve, and are sealed by an O-ring in a groove in the contact face of the cylinder valve. The user screws the clamp in place finger-tight to hold the metal surfaces of cylinder valve and regulator first stage in contact, compressing the o-ring between the radial faces of valve and regulator. When the valve is opened, gas pressure presses the O-ring against the outer cylindrical surface of the groove, completing the seal. The diver must take care not to screw the yoke down too tightly, or it may prove impossible to remove without tools. Conversely, failing to tighten sufficiently can lead to O-ring extrusion under pressure and a major loss of breathing gas. This can be a serious problem if it happens when the diver is at depth. Yoke fittings are rated up to a maximum of 240 bar working pressure.

The DIN fitting is a type of screw-in connection to the cylinder valve. The DIN system is less common worldwide, but has the advantage of withstanding greater pressure, up to 300 bar, allowing use of high-pressure steel cylinders. They are less susceptible to blowing the O-ring seal if banged against something while in use. DIN fittings are the standard in much of Europe and are available in most countries. The DIN fitting is considered more secure and therefore safer by many technical divers. It is more compact than the yoke fitting and less exposed to impact with an overhead.

==== Conversion kits ====
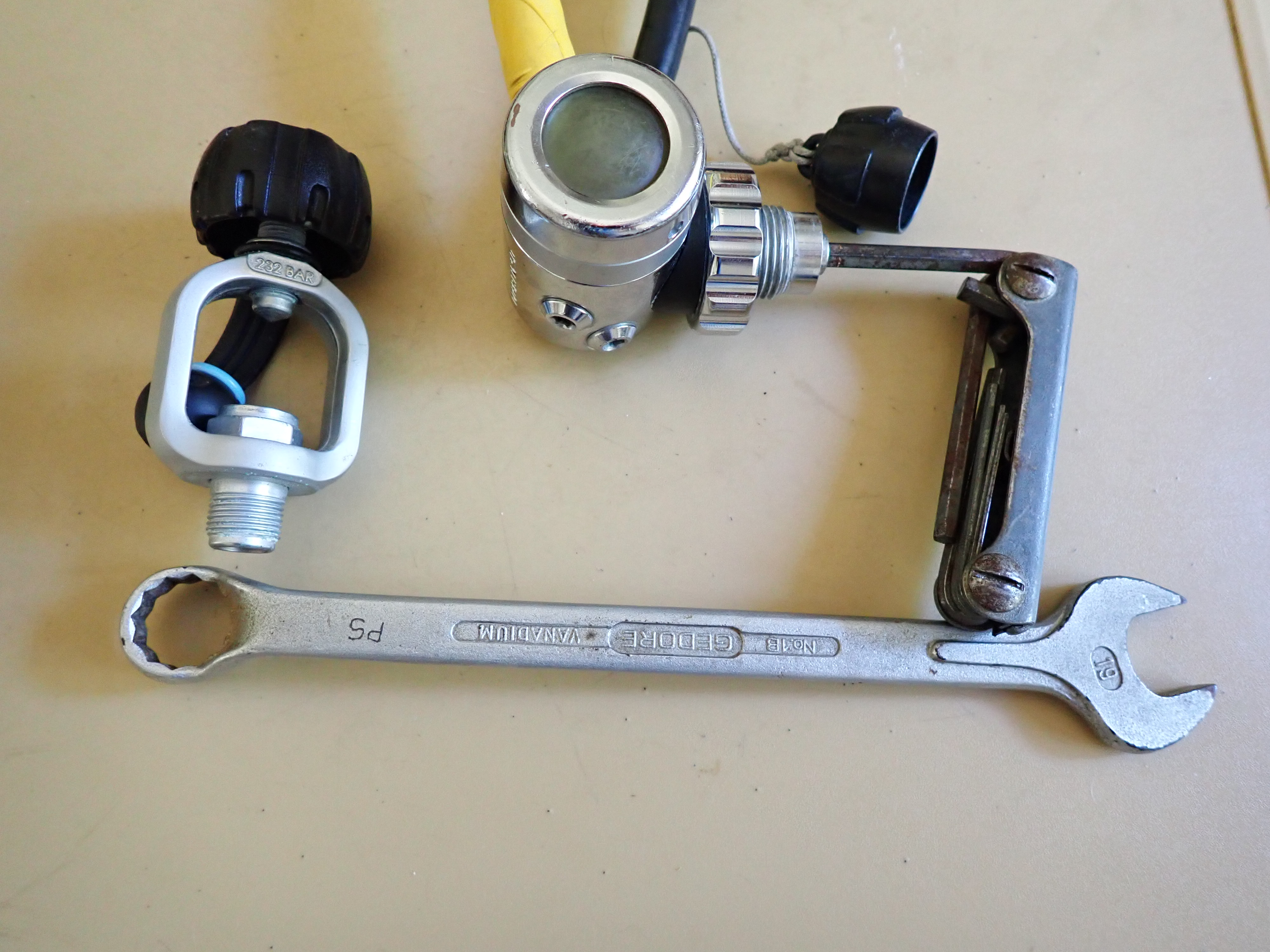
Parts and tools to convert an Apeks first stage diving regulator from DIN to Yoke connector

Several manufacturers market an otherwise identical first stage varying only in the choice of cylinder valve connection. In these cases it may be possible to buy original components to convert yoke to DIN and vice versa. The complexity of the conversion may vary, and parts are not usually interchangeable between manufacturers. The conversion of Apeks regulators is particularly simple and only requires an Allen key and a ring spanner.

==== Adaptors ====
Adaptors are available to allow connection of DIN regulators to yoke cylinder valves (A-clamp or yoke adaptor), and to connect yoke regulators to DIN cylinder valves. There are two types of adaptors for DIN valves: plug adaptors and block adaptors. Plug adaptors are screwed into a 5-thread DIN valve socket, are rated for 232/240 bar, and can only be used with valves which are designed to accept them. These can be recognised by a dimple recess opposite to the outlet opening, used to locate the screw of an A-clamp. Block adaptors are generally rated for 200 bar, and can be used with almost any 200 bar 5-thread DIN valve. A-clamp or yoke adaptors comprise a yoke clamp with a DIN socket in line. They are slightly more vulnerable to O-ring extrusion than integral yoke clamps, due to greater leverage on the first stage regulator.

=== Single-hose demand regulators ===
Most contemporary diving regulators are single-hose two-stage demand regulators. They consist of a first-stage regulator and a second-stage demand valve connected by a low pressure hose to transfer breathing gas, and allow relative movement within the constraints of hose length and flexibility.

The first stage is mounted to the cylinder valve or manifold via one of the standard connectors (Yoke or DIN), and reduces cylinder pressure to an intermediate pressure, usually about 8 to 11 bars (120 to 160 psi) higher than the ambient pressure, also called interstage pressure, medium pressure or low pressure.

A balanced regulator first stage automatically keeps a constant pressure difference between the interstage pressure and the ambient pressure even as the tank pressure drops with consumption. The balanced regulator design allows the first stage orifice to be as large as needed without incurring performance degradation as a result of changing tank pressure.

The first stage regulator body generally has several low-pressure outlets (ports) for second-stage regulators and BCD and dry suit inflators, and one or more high-pressure outlets, which allow a submersible pressure gauge (SPG), gas-integrated diving computer or remote pressure tranducer to read the cylinder pressure. One low-pressure port with a larger bore may be designated for the primary second stage as it will give a higher flow at maximum demand for lower work of breathing.

The mechanism inside the first stage can be of the diaphragm or piston type, and can be balanced or unbalanced. Unbalanced regulators produce an interstage pressure which varies slightly as the cylinder pressure changes and to limit this variation the high-pressure orifice size is small, which decreases the maximum capacity of the regulator. A balanced regulator maintains a constant interstage pressure difference for all cylinder pressures.

The second stage, or demand valve reduces the pressure of the interstage air supply to ambient pressure on demand from the diver. The operation of the valve is triggered by a drop in downstream pressure as the diver breathes in. In an upstream valve, the valve is held closed by the interstage pressure and opens by moving into the flow of gas. They are often made as tilt-valves, which are mechanically extremely simple and reliable, but are not amenable to fine tuning.

Most modern demand valves use a downstream valve mechanism, where the valve poppet moves in the same direction as the flow of gas to open and is kept closed by a spring. The poppet is lifted away from the crown by a lever operated by the diaphragm. Two patterns are commonly used. One is the classic push-pull arrangement, where the actuating lever goes onto the end of the valve shaft and is held on by a nut. Any deflection of the lever is converted to an axial pull on the valve shaft, lifting the seat off the crown and allowing air to flow. The other is the barrel poppet arrangement, where the poppet is enclosed in a tube which crosses the regulator body and the lever operates through slots in the sides of the tube. The far end of the tube is accessible from the side of the casing and a spring tension adjustment screw may be fitted for limited diver control of the cracking pressure. This arrangement also allows relatively simple pressure balancing of the second stage.

A downstream valve will function as an over-pressure valve when the inter-stage pressure is raised sufficiently to overcome the spring pre-load. If the first stage leaks and the inter-stage over-pressurizes, the second stage downstream valve opens automatically. If the leak is bad this could result in a "freeflow", but a slow leak will generally cause intermittent "popping" of the DV, as the pressure is released and slowly builds up again.

If the first stage leaks and the inter-stage over-pressurizes, the second stage upstream valve will not release the excess pressure, This might hinder the supply of breathing gas and possibly result in a ruptured hose or the failure of another second stage valve, such as one that inflates a buoyancy device. When a second stage upstream valve is used a relief valve will be included by the manufacturer on the first stage regulator to protect the hose.

If a shut-off valve is fitted between the first and second stages, as is found on scuba bailout systems used for commercial diving and in some technical diving configurations, the demand valve will normally be isolated and unable to function as a relief valve. In this case an overpressure valve must be fitted to the first stage. They are available as aftermarket accessories which can be screwed into any available low pressure port on the first stage.

Some demand valves use a small, sensitive pilot valve to control the opening of the main valve. The Poseidon Jetstream and Xstream and Oceanic Omega second stages are examples of this technology. They can produce very high flow rates for a small pressure differential, and particularly for a relatively small cracking pressure. They are generally more complicated and expensive to service.

Exhaled gas leaves the demand valve housing through one or two exhaust ports. Exhaust valves are necessary to prevent the diver inhaling water, and to allow a negative pressure difference to be induced over the diaphragm to operate the demand valve. The exhaust valves should operate at a very small positive pressure difference, and cause as little resistance to flow as reasonably possible, without being cumbersome and bulky. Elastomer mushroom valves serve the purpose adequately. Where it is important to avoid leaks back into the regulator, such as when diving in contaminated water, a system of two sets of valves in series can reduce the risk of contamination. A more complex option which can be used for surface supplied helmets, is to use a reclaim exhaust system which uses a separate flow regulator to control the exhaust which is returned to the surface in a dedicated hose in the umbilical. The exhaust manifold (exhaust tee, exhaust cover, whiskers) is the ducting that protects the exhaust valve(s) and diverts the exhaled air to the sides so that it does not bubble up in the diver's face and obscure the view.

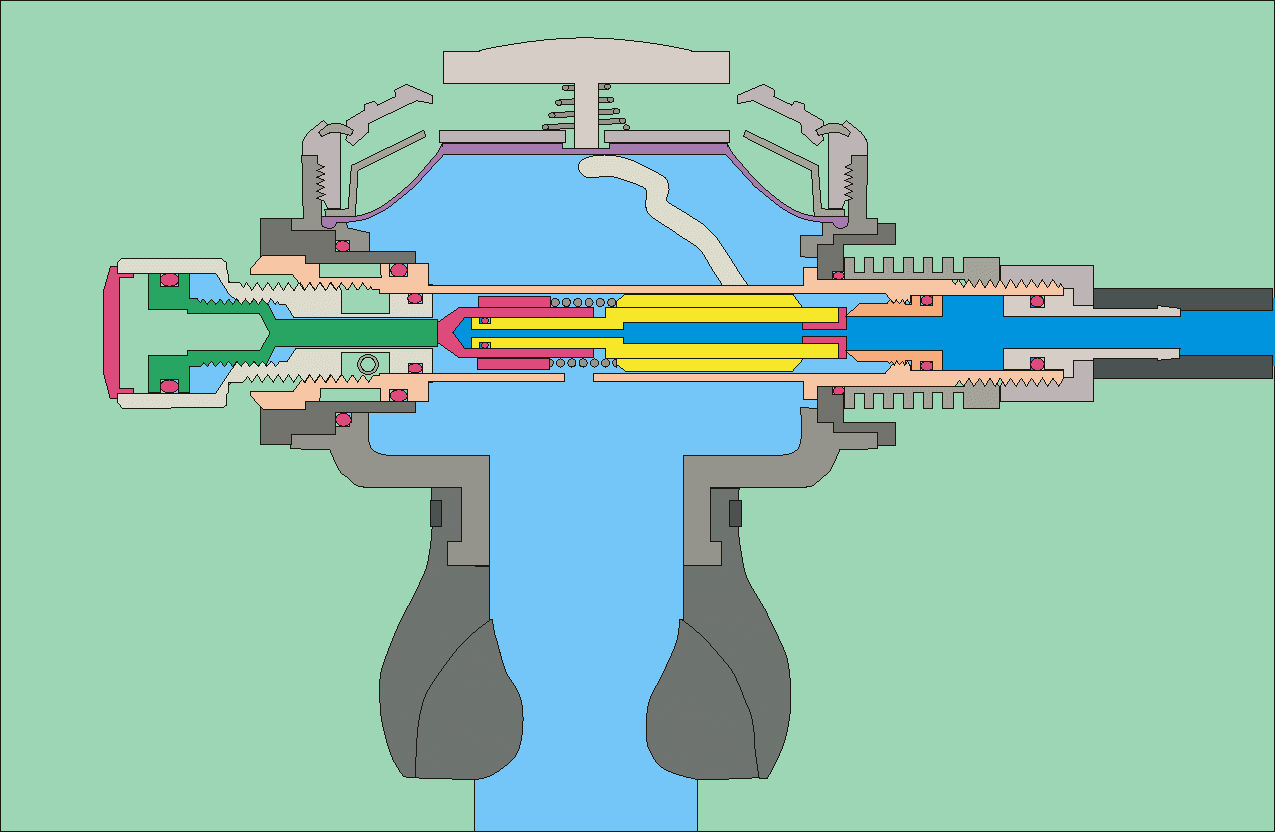
The purge button (top-centre) is held away from the diaphragm by a spring. The valve is closed.

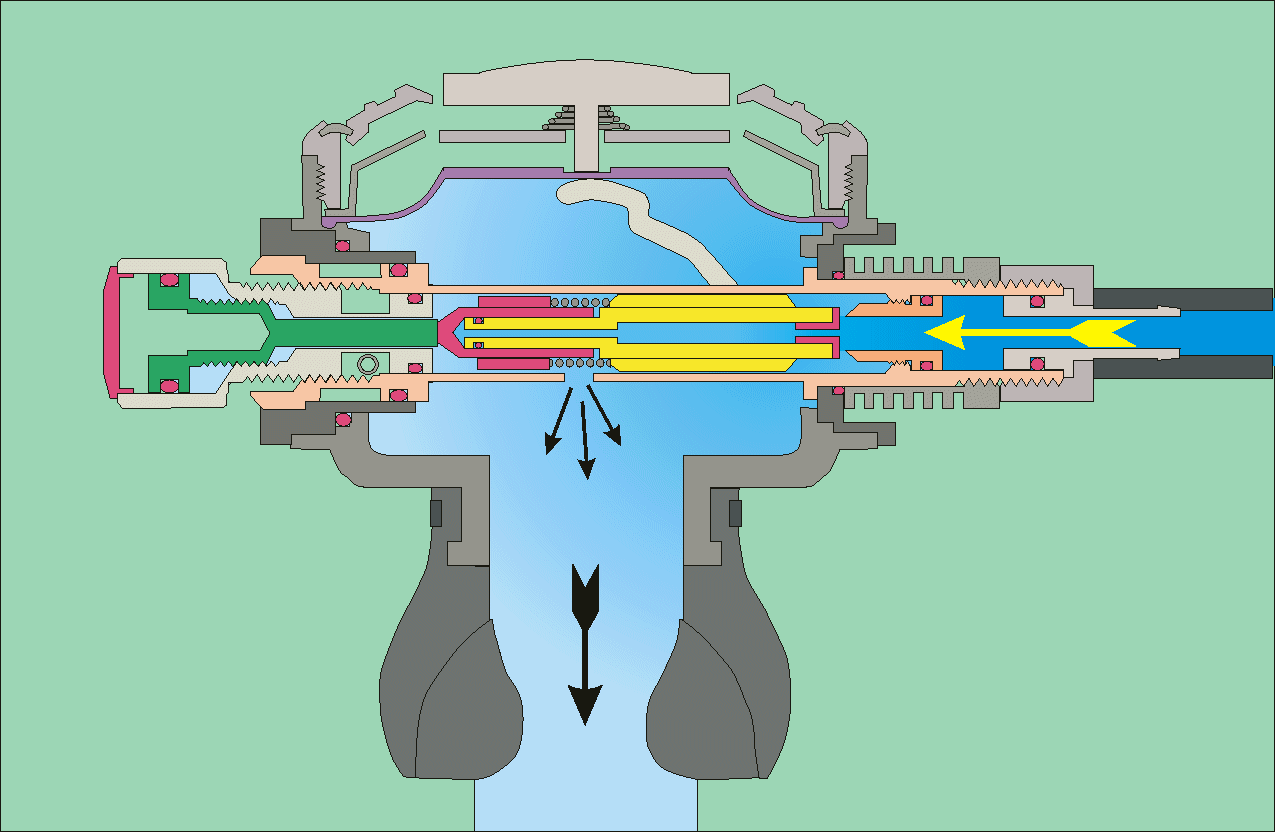
The purge button (top-centre) is depressed. The valve is partially open.

A standard fitting on single-hose second stages, both mouth-held and built into a full-face mask or demand helmet, is the purge-button, which allows the diver to manually deflect the diaphragm to open the valve and cause air to flow into the casing. This is usually used to purge the casing or full-face mask of water if it has flooded. This will often happen if the second stage is dropped or removed from the mouth while under-water. It is either a separate part mounted in the front cover or the cover itself may be made flexible and serves as the purge button. Depressing the purge button presses against the diapragm directly over the lever of the demand valve, and this movement of the lever opens the valve to release air through the regulator. The tongue may be used to block the mouthpiece during purging to prevent water or other matter in the regulator from being blown into the diver's airway by the air blast. This is particularly important when purging after vomiting through the regulator. The purge button is also used by recreational divers to inflate a delayed surface marker buoy or lifting bag. Any time that the purge button is operated, the diver must be aware of the potential for a freeflow and be ready to deal with it.

It may be desirable for the diver to have some manual control over the flow characteristics of the demand valve. The usual adjustable aspects are cracking pressure and the feedback from flow rate to internal pressure of the second stage housing. The inter-stage pressure of surface supplied demand breathing apparatus is controlled manually at the control panel, and does not automatically adjust to the ambient pressure in the way that most scuba first stages do, as this feature is controlled by feedback to the first stage from ambient pressure. This has the effect that the cracking pressure of a surface supplied demand valve will vary slightly with depth, so some manufacturers provide a manual adjustment knob on the side of the demand valve housing to adjust spring pressure on the downstream valve, which controls the cracking pressure. The knob is known to commercial divers as "dial-a-breath". A similar adjustment is provided on some high-end scuba demand valves, to allow the user to manually tune the breathing effort at depth

Scuba demand valves which are set to breathe lightly (low cracking pressure, and low work of breathing) may tend to free-flow relatively easily, particularly if the gas flow in the housing has been designed to assist in holding the valve open by reducing the internal pressure. The cracking pressure of a sensitive demand valve is often less than the hydrostatic pressure difference between the inside of an air-filled housing and the water below the diaphragm when the mouthpiece is pointed upwards. To avoid excessive loss of gas due to inadvertent activation of the valve when the DV is out of the diver's mouth, some second stages have a desensitising mechanism which causes some back-pressure in the housing, by impeding the flow or directing it against the inside of the diaphragm.

=== Twin-hose demand regulators ===
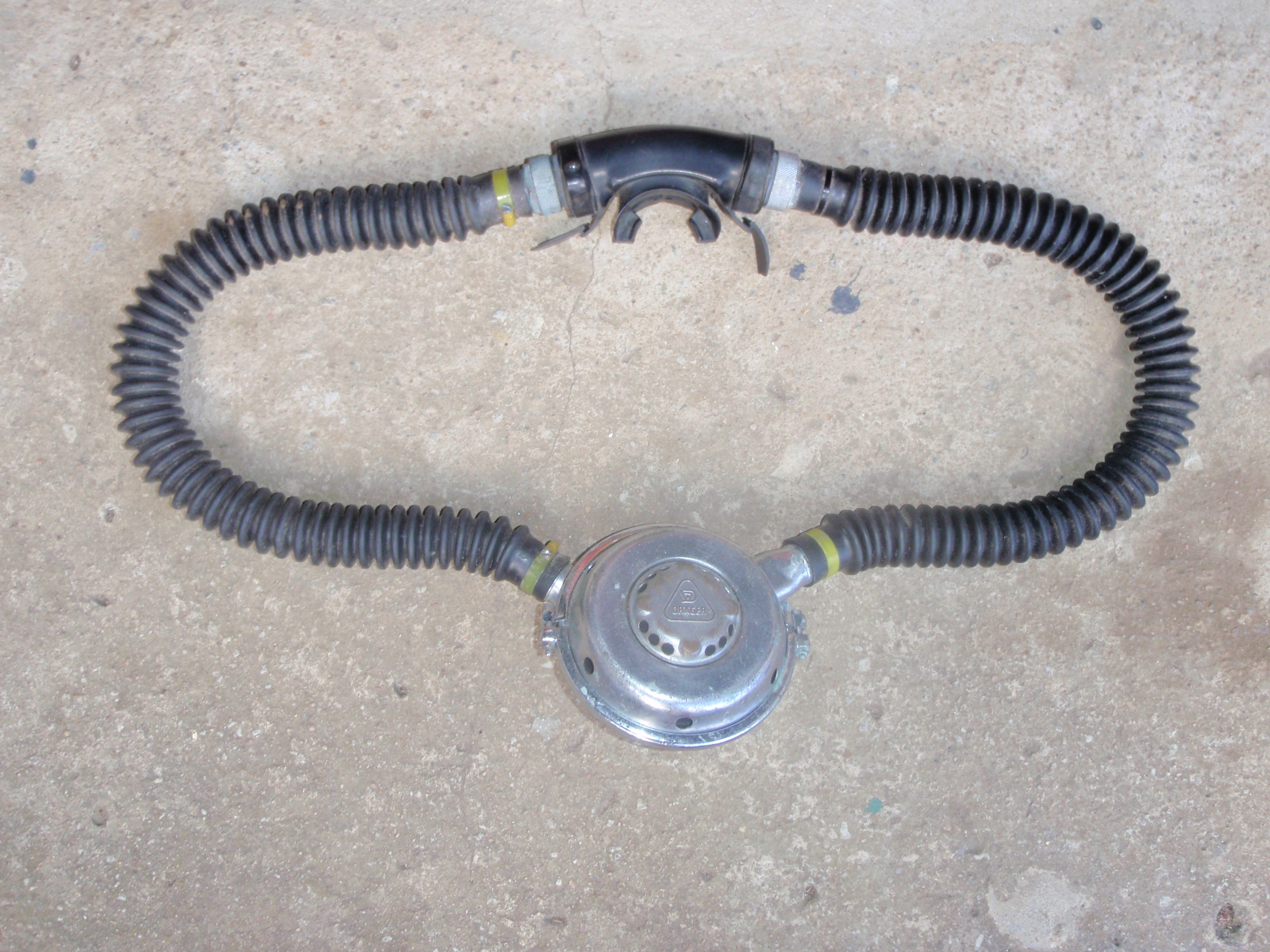
A Dräger two-stage twin-hose regulator

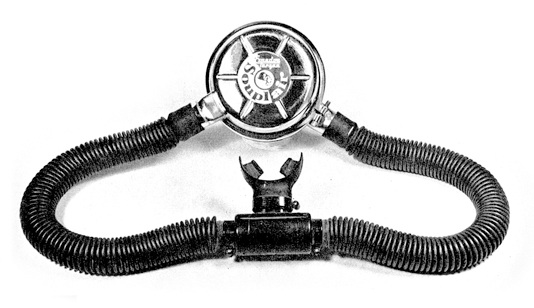
Beuchat "Souplair" single stage twin hose regulator

The "twin", "double" or "two" hose configuration of scuba demand valve was the first in general use. This type of regulator has two large bore corrugated breathing tubes. One tube is to supply air from the regulator to the mouthpiece, and the second tube delivers the exhaled gas to a point near the demand diaphragm where the ambient pressure is the same, and where it is released through a rubber duck-bill one-way valve, to escape out of the holes in the cover. Advantages of this type of regulator are that the bubbles leave the regulator behind the diver's head, increasing visibility, reducing noise and producing less load on the diver's mouth, They remain popular with some underwater photographers and Aqualung brought out an updated version of the Mistral in 2005.

The mechanism of the twin hose regulator is packaged in a usually circular metal housing mounted on the cylinder valve behind the diver's neck. The demand valve component of a two-stage twin hose regulator is thus mounted in the same housing as the first stage regulator, and in order to prevent free-flow, the exhaust valve must be located at the same depth as the diaphragm, and the only reliable place to do this is in the same housing. The air flows through a pair of corrugated rubber hoses to and from the mouthpiece. The supply hose is connected to one side of the regulator body and supplies air to the mouthpiece through a non-return valve, and the exhaled air is returned to the regulator housing on the outside of the diaphragm, also through a non-return valve on the other side of the mouthpiece and usually through another non-return exhaust valve in the regulator housing - often a "duckbill" type.

A non-return valve is usually fitted to the breathing hoses where they connect to the mouthpiece. This prevents any water that gets into the mouthpiece from going into the inhalation hose, and ensures that once it is blown into the exhalation hose that it cannot flow back. This slightly increases the flow resistance of air, but makes the regulator easier to clear.

Ideally the delivered pressure is equal to the resting pressure in the diver's lungs as this is what human lungs are adapted to breathe. With a twin hose regulator behind the diver at shoulder level, the delivered pressure changes with diver orientation. if the diver rolls on his or her back the released air pressure is higher than in the lungs. Divers learned to restrict flow by using their tongue to close the mouthpiece. When the cylinder pressure was running low and air demand effort rising, a roll to the right side made breathing easier. The mouthpiece can be purged by lifting it above the regulator (shallower), which will cause a free flow. Twin hose regulators have been superseded almost completely by single hose regulators and became obsolete for most diving since the 1980s. Raising the mouthpiece above the regulator increases the delivered pressure of gas and lowering the mouthpiece reduces delivered pressure and increases breathing resistance. As a result, many aqualung divers, when they were snorkeling on the surface to save air while reaching the dive site, put the loop of hoses under an arm to avoid the mouthpiece floating up causing free flow.

The original twin-hose regulators usually had no ports for accessories, though some had a high pressure port for a submersible pressure gauge. Some later models have one or more low-pressure ports between the stages, which can be used to supply direct feeds for suit or BC inflation and/or a secondary single-hose demand valve, and a high pressure port for a submersible pressure gauge. The new Mistral is an exception as it is based on the Aqualung Titan first stage. which has the usual set of ports.

Some early twin hose regulators were of single-stage design. The first stage functions in a way similar to the second stage of two-stage demand valves, but would be connected directly to the cylinder valve and reduced high pressure air from the cylinder directly to ambient pressure on demand. This could be done by using a longer lever and larger diameter diaphragm to control the valve movement, but there was a tendency for cracking pressure, and thus work of breathing, to vary as the cylinder pressure dropped.

The twin-hose arrangement with a bite-grip mouthpiece or full-face mask is common in rebreathers, but as part of the breathing loop, not as part of a regulator. The associated demand valve comprising the open-circuit bail-out valve is a second stage single hose regulator.

== Performance ==
The breathing performance of regulators is a measure of the ability of a breathing gas regulator to meet the demands placed on it at varying ambient pressures and under varying breathing loads, for the range of breathing gases it may be expected to deliver. Performance is an important factor in design and selection of breathing regulators for any application, but particularly for underwater diving, as the range of ambient operating pressures and variety of breathing gases is broader in this application. It is desirable that breathing from a regulator requires low effort even when supplying large amounts of breathing gas as this is commonly the limiting factor for underwater exertion, and can be critical during diving emergencies. It is also preferable that the gas is delivered smoothly without any sudden changes in resistance while inhaling or exhaling. Although these factors may be judged subjectively, it is convenient to have a standard by which the many different types and manufactures of regulators may be compared.

The original Cousteau twin-hose diving regulators could deliver about 140 litres of air per minute at continuous flow and that was officially thought to be adequate, but divers sometimes needed a higher instantaneous rate and had to learn not to "beat the lung", i.e. to breathe faster than the regulator could supply. Between 1948 and 1952 Ted Eldred designed his Porpoise single hose regulator to supply up to 300 liters per minute.

Various breathing machines have been developed and used for assessment of breathing apparatus performance. ANSTI Test Systems Ltd (UK) has developed a testing machine that measures the inhalation and exhalation effort in using a regulator at all realistic water temperatures. Publishing results of the performance of regulators in the ANSTI test machine has resulted in big performance improvements.

At higher gas densities associated with greater depth and pressure, breathing may be physiologically limited by the capacity of the diver to move gas through the breathing passages of the lungs against dynamic airway compression.

=== Ergonomics ===
Several factors affect the comfort and effectiveness of diving regulators. Work of breathing has been mentioned, and can be critical to diver performance under high workload and when using dense gas at depth.

Mouth-held demand valves may exert forces on the teeth and jaws of the user that can lead to fatigue and pain, occasionally repetitive stress injury, and early rubber mouthpieces often caused an allergic reaction of contact surfaces in the mouth, which has been largely eliminated by the use of hypoallergenic silicone rubber. Various designs of mouthpiece have been developed to reduce this problem. The feel of some mouthpieces on the palate can induce a gag reflex in some divers, while in others it causes no discomfort. The style of the bite surfaces can influence comfort and various styles are available as aftermarket accessories. Personal testing is the usual way to identify what works best for the individual, and in some models the grip surfaces can be moulded to better fit the diver's bite. The lead of the low-pressure hose can also induce mouth loads when the hose is of an unsuitable length or is forced into small radius curves to reach the mouth. This can usually be avoided by careful adjuctment of hose lead and sometimes a different hose length.

Regulators supported by helmets and full-face masks eliminate the load on the lips, teeth and jaws, but add mechanical dead space, which can be reduced by using an orinasal inner mask to separate the breathing circuit from the rest of the interior air space. This can also help reduce fogging of the viewport, which can seriously restrict vision. Some fogging will still occur, and a means of defogging is necessary. The internal volume of a helmet or full-face mask may exert unbalanced buoyancy forces on the diver's neck, or if compensated by ballast, weight loads when out of the water. The material of some orinasal mask seals and full-face mask skirts can cause allergic reactions, but newer models tend to use hypoallegenic materials and are seldom a problem.

=== Malfunctions and failure modes ===
Most regulator malfunctions involve improper supply of breathing gas or water leaking into the gas supply. There are two major gas supply failure modes, where the regulator shuts off delivery, which is extremely rare, and free-flow, where the delivery will not stop and can quickly exhaust a scuba supply. Various lesser malfunctions mostly involve partial reductions in supply, non-catastrophic leaks, and ergonomic faults that make the regulator difficult, uncomfortable, or dangerous to use. Some malfunctions can be quickly and easily corrected by the user if they know what to do, others may require professional servicing, troubleshooting, or replacement of parts. Some may simply be the consequence of using it beyond its specified operating range.

Inlet filter blockage
The inlet to the first stage is usually protected by a filter to prevent corrosion products or other contaminants in the cylinder from getting into the fine between moving parts of the first and second stage and jamming them, either open or closed. If enough dirt gets into these filters, they themselves can be blocked sufficiently to reduce performance, but are unlikely to result in a total or sudden catastrophic failure. Sintered bronze filters can also gradually clog with corrosion products if they get wet. Inlet filter blockage will become more noticeable as the cylinder pressure drops or depth increases.
Sticking valves
The moving parts in first and second stages have fine tolerances in places, and some designs are more susceptible to contaminants causing friction between the moving parts. this may increase cracking pressure, reduce flow rate, increase work of breathing or induce free-flow, depending on what part is affected.
Free-flow
Either of the stages may get stuck in the open position, causing a continuous flow of gas from the regulator known as a free-flow. This can be triggered by a range of causes, some of which can be easily remedied, others not. Possible causes include incorrect interstage pressure setting, incorrect second stage valve spring tension, damaged or sticking valve poppet, damaged valve seat, valve freezing, wrong sensitivity setting at the surface and in Poseidon servo-assisted second stages, low interstage pressure.
Freezing
In cold conditions the cooling effect of gas expanding through a valve orifice may cool either first or second stage sufficiently to cause ice to form. External icing may lock up the spring and exposed moving parts of first or second stage, and freezing of moisture in the stored gas may cause icing on internal surfaces. Either may cause the moving parts of the affected stage to jam open or closed. If the valve freezes closed, it will usually defrost quite rapidly and start working again, and may freeze open soon after. Freezing open is more of a problem, as the valve will then free-flow and cool further in a positive feedback loop, which can normally only be stopped by closing the cylinder valve and waiting for the ice to thaw. If not stopped, the cylinder will rapidly be emptied.
Intermediate pressure creep
This is a slow leak of the first stage valve, often caused by a worn, damaged or dirty valve seat. The effect is for the interstage pressure to rise until either the next breath is drawn, or the pressure exerts more force on the second stage valve than can be resisted by the spring, and the valve opens briefly, often with a popping sound, to relieve the pressure. the frequency of the popping pressure relief depends on the flow in the second stage, the back pressure, the second stage spring tension and the magnitude of the leak. It may range from occasional loud pops to a constant hiss.
Gas leaks
Gas leaks can be caused by burst or leaky hoses, defective or blown o-rings, particularly in yoke connectors, loose connections, and several of the previously listed malfunctions. Low pressure inflation hoses may fail to connect properly, or the non-return valve may leak. A relatively common o-ring failure occurs when the yoke clamp seal extrudes due to insufficient clamp force or elastic deformation of the clamp by impact with the surroundings.
Wet breathing
Wet breathing is caused by water getting into the regulator and compromising breathing comfort and safety. Water can leak into the second stage body through damaged soft parts like torn mouthpieces, damaged exhaust valves and perforated diaphragms, through cracked housings, or through poorly sealing or fouled exhaust valves.
Excessive work of breathing
High work of breathing can be caused by high inhalation resistance, high exhalation resistance or both. High inhalation resistance can be caused by high cracking pressure, low inter-stage pressure, friction in second stage valve moving parts, excessive spring loading, or sub-optimum valve design. It can usually be improved by servicing and tuning, but some regulators cannot deliver high flow at great depths without high work of breathing. High exhalation resistance is usually due to a problem with the exhaust valves, which can stick, stiffen due to deterioration of the materials, or may have an insufficient flow passage area for the service. Work of breathing increases with gas density, and therefore with depth. Total work of breathing for the diver is a combination of physiological work of breathing and mechanical work of breathing. It is possible for this combination to exceed the capacity of the diver, who can then suffocate due to carbon dioxide toxicity.
Juddering, shuddering and moaning
This is caused by an irregular and unstable flow from the second stage, It may be caused by an unstable feedback between flow rate in the second stage body and diaphragm deflection opening the valve, which is not sufficient to cause free-flow, but enough to cause the system to hunt. Juddering may also be caused by excessive but irregular friction of valve moving parts.
Physical damage to the housing or components
Damage such as cracked housings, torn or dislodged mouthpieces, damaged exhaust fairings, can cause gas flow problems or leaks, or can make the regulator uncomfortable to use or difficult to breathe from. Use of a contaminated or non-compatible regulator with high oxygen fraction gas at high pressure can lead to internal ignition, which may merely destroy a seal or other minor component, or burn up a significant part of the equipment and surroundings.

== Accessories and special features ==
A variety of accessories may be fitted to most diving regulators, some of which are considered standard equipment. Many of them are attached to a port on the first stage. Two types of port are provided – high pressure ports for pressure measurement, with a 7/16" UNF thread and O-ring seal, and low-pressure ports to supply gas to the accessory, which are usually 3/8" UNF with O-ring seal, but a few models used 1/2" UNF for the primary regulator. When not used these ports are sealed by screw-in plugs.

=== Anti-freezing modification ===
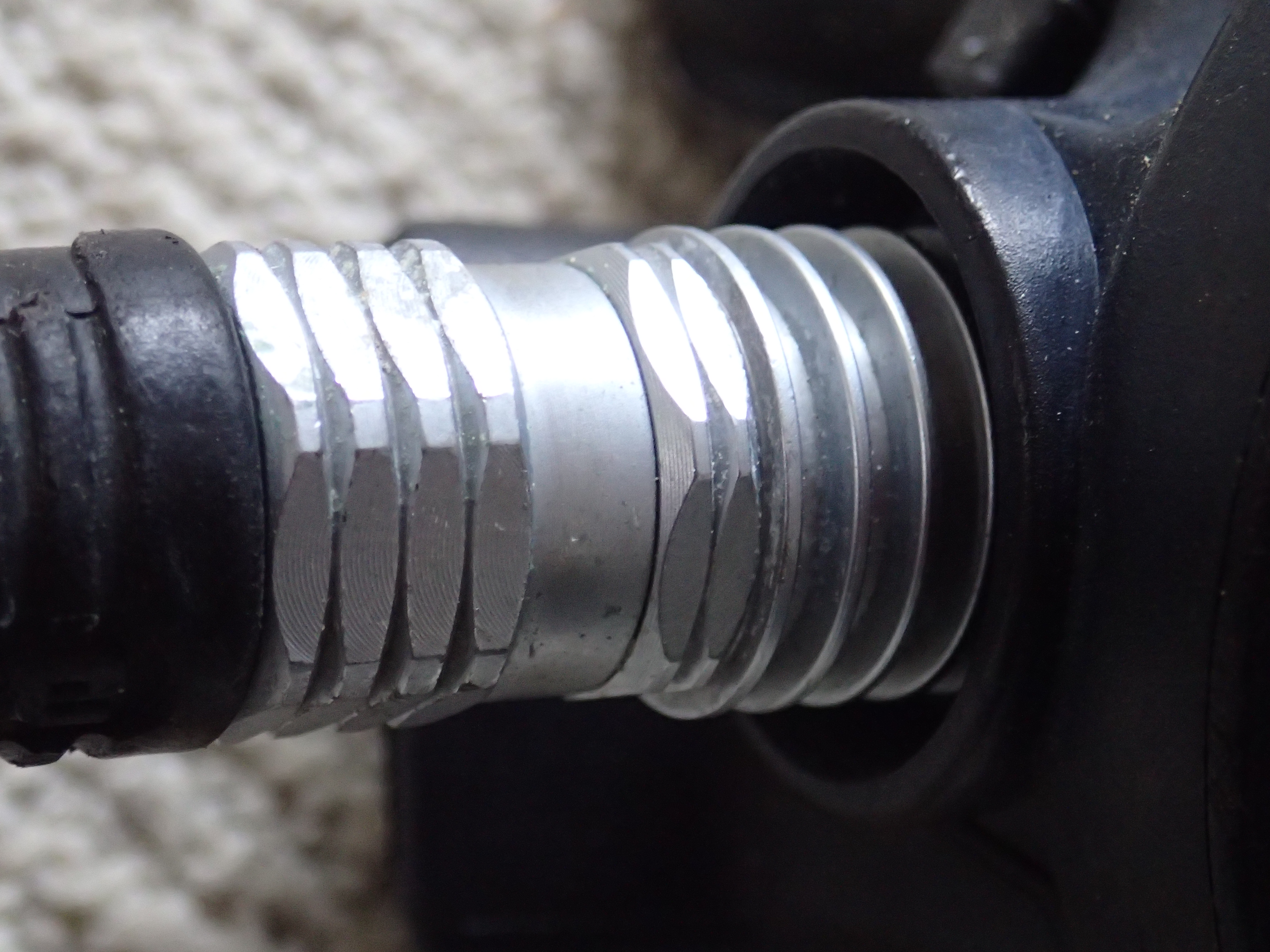
Apeks TX100 second stage showing heat exchange fins on chromed brass demand valve seat housing

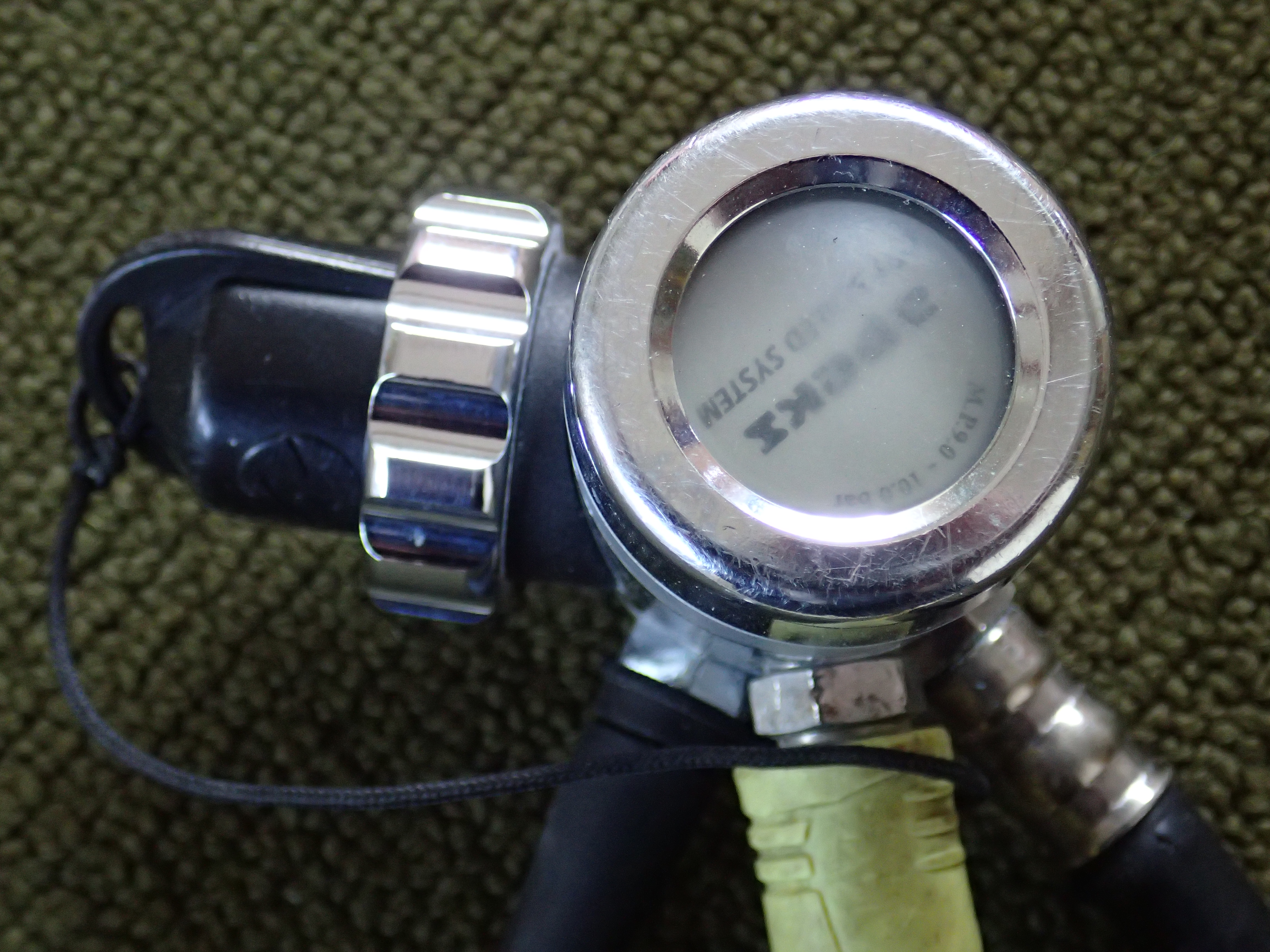
Apeks first stage showing environmental sealing diaphragm

As gas leaves the cylinder it decreases in pressure in the first stage, becoming very cold due to adiabatic expansion. Where the ambient water temperature is less than 5 °C any water in contact with the regulator may freeze. If this ice jams the diaphragm or piston spring, preventing the valve closing, a free-flow may ensue that can empty a full cylinder within a minute or two, and the free-flow causes further cooling in a positive feedback loop. Generally the water that freezes is in the ambient pressure chamber around a spring that keeps the valve open and not moisture in the breathing gas from the cylinder, but that is also possible if the air is not adequately filtered. The modern trend of using plastics to replace metal components in regulators encourages freezing because it insulates the inside of a cold regulator from the warmer surrounding water. Some regulators are provided with heat exchange fins in areas where cooling due to air expansion is a problem, such as around the second stage valve seat on some regulators.

Cold water kits can be used to reduce the risk of freezing inside the regulator. Some regulators come with this as standard, and some others can be retrofitted. Environmental sealing of the diaphragm main spring chamber using a soft secondary diaphragm and hydrostatic transmitter or a silicone, alcohol or glycol/water mixture antifreeze liquid in the sealed spring compartment can be used for a diaphragm regulator. Silicone grease in the spring chamber can be used on a piston first stage. The Poseidon Xstream first stage insulates the external spring and spring housing from the rest of the regulator, so that it is less chilled by the expanding air, and provides large slots in the housing so that the spring can be warmed by the water, thus avoiding the problem of freezing up the external spring.

Kirby Morgan have developed a stainless steel tube heat exchanger ("Thermo Exchanger") to warm the gas from the first stage regulator to reduce the risk of second stage scuba regulator freeze when diving in extremely cold water at temperatures down to −2.2 °C (28.0 °F). The length and relatively good thermal conductivity of the tubing, and the thermal mass of the block allows sufficient heat from the water to warm the air to within one to two degrees of the surrounding water.

=== Shut-off valve ===
Some divers install a sliding sleeve type shut-off valve between the low-pressure hose and the demand valve, so they can shut off the flow to a free-flowing second stage, usually when it ices up. This prevents the pressure relief function of the second stage, so a pressure relief valve must be fitted to the first stage to prevent the hose from bursting as pressure increases. Interstage pressure can rise to cylinder pressure if the first stage does not seal.

=== Pressure relief valve ===
A downstream demand valve serves as a fail safe for over-pressurization: if a first stage with a demand valve malfunctions and jams in the open position, the demand valve will be over-pressurized and will "free flow". Although it presents the diver with an imminent "out of air" crisis, this failure mode lets gas escape directly into the water without inflating buoyancy devices. The effect of unintentional inflation might be to carry the diver quickly to the surface causing the various injuries that can result from an over-fast ascent. There are circumstances where regulators are connected to inflatable equipment such as a rebreather's breathing bag, a buoyancy compensator, or a drysuit, but without the need for demand valves. Examples of this are argon suit inflation sets and "off board" or secondary diluent cylinders for closed-circuit rebreathers. When no demand valve is connected to a regulator, it should be equipped with a pressure relief valve, unless it has a built in over pressure valve, so that over-pressurization does not inflate any buoyancy devices connected to the regulator or burst the low-pressure hose.

=== Pressure monitoring ===
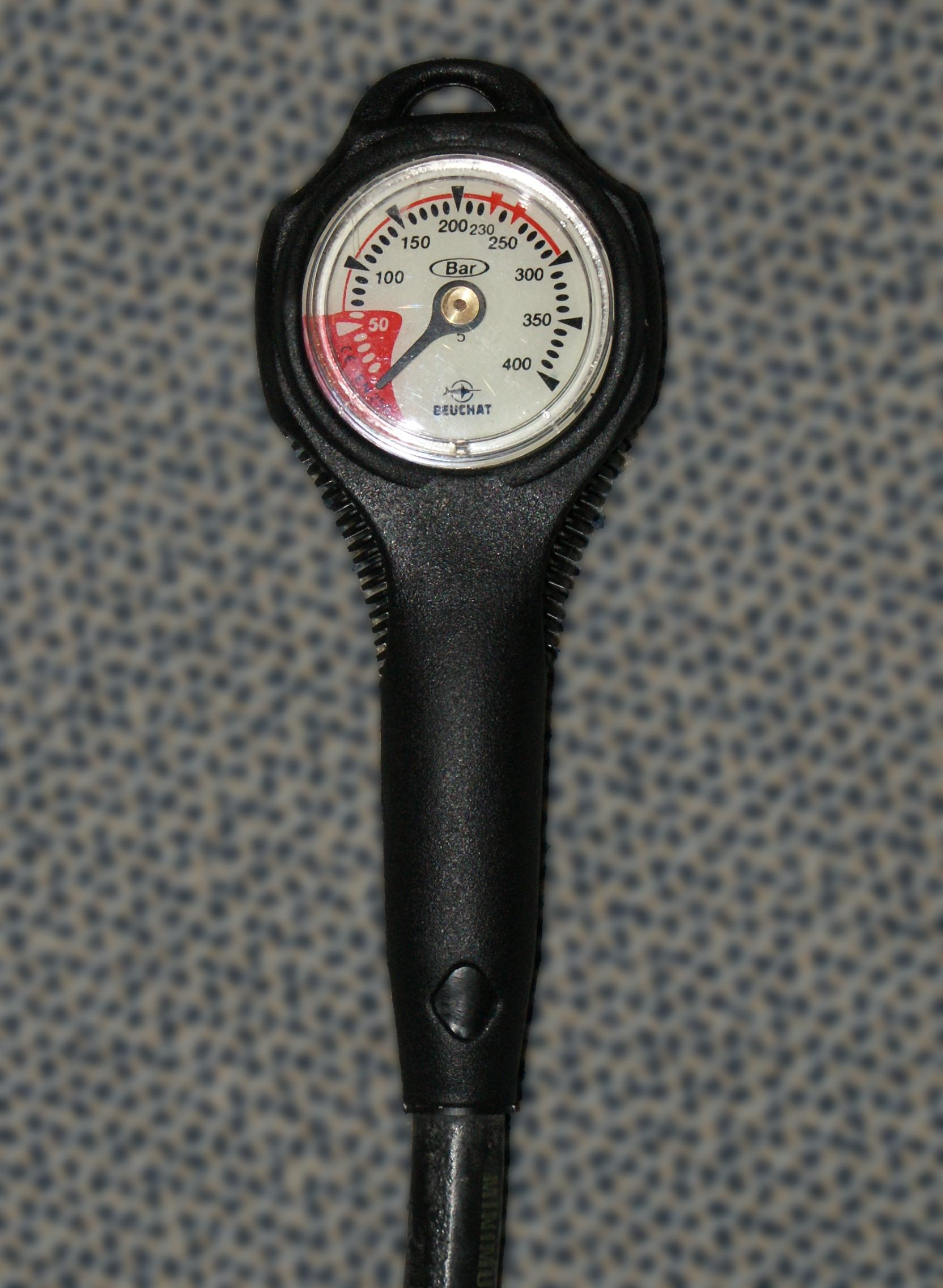
Submersible pressure gauge

A scuba regulator first stage has one or two high pressure ports upstream of all pressure-reducing valves to monitor the gas pressure remaining in the diving cylinder, provided that the valve is open. The standard connection is an O-ring sealed 7/16" UNF inside thread. There are several types of pressure gauge.

==== Standard submersible pressure gauge ====
The standard arrangement has a high pressure hose leading to a submersible pressure gauge (SPG) (also called a contents gauge). This is an analog mechanical gauge, usually with a Bourdon tube mechanism. It displays with a pointer moving over a dial, usually about 50 millimetres (2.0 in) diameter. Sometimes they are mounted in a console, which is a plastic or rubber case that holds the breathing gas pressure gauge and other instruments such as a depth gauge, dive computer and/or compass. The high pressure port usually has 7/16"-20 tpi UNF internal thread with an O-ring seal. This makes it impossible to connect a low pressure hose to the high pressure port. Early regulators occasionally used other thread sizes, including 3/8" UNF and 1/8" BSP (Poseidon Cyklon 200), and some of these allowed connection of low-pressure hose to high pressure port, which is dangerous with an upstream valve second stage or a BC or dry suit inflation hose, as the hose could burst under pressure.

The first commercially available SPGs were on the US market by the early 1960s. The Sortsways "Sea Vue" pressurge gauge was advertised in 1961. They were initially mounted axially on the HP hose, and later a swivel was added for convenience. Similar gauges had been available on some firefighting SCBA sets earlier (1945?).

==== High pressure hose ====
The high pressure hose is a small bore flexible hose with permanently swaged end fittings that connects the submersible pressure gauge to the HP port of the regulator first stage. The HP hose end that fits the HP port usually has a very small bore orifice to restrict flow. This both reduces shock loads on the pressure gauge when the cylinder valve is opened, and reduces the loss of gas through the hose if it bursts or leaks for any reason. This tiny hole is vulnerable to blocking by corrosion products if the regulator is flooded, or by dust particles or corrosion products from a contaminated cylinder. At the other end of the hose the fitting to connect to the SPG usually has a swivel, allowing the gauge to be rotated on the hose under pressure. The seal between hose and gauge uses a small component generally referred to as a spool, which seals with an O-ring at each end that fits into the hose end and gauge with a barrel seal. This swivel can leak if the O-rings deteriorate, which is quite common, particularly with oxygen-rich breathing gas. The failure is seldom catastrophic, but the leak will get worse over time. High pressure hose lengths vary from about 150 millimetres (6 in) for sling and side-mount cylinders to about 750 millimetres (30 in) for back mounted scuba. Other lengths may be available off the shelf or made to order for special applications such as rebreathers or back mount with valve down.

==== Button gauges ====
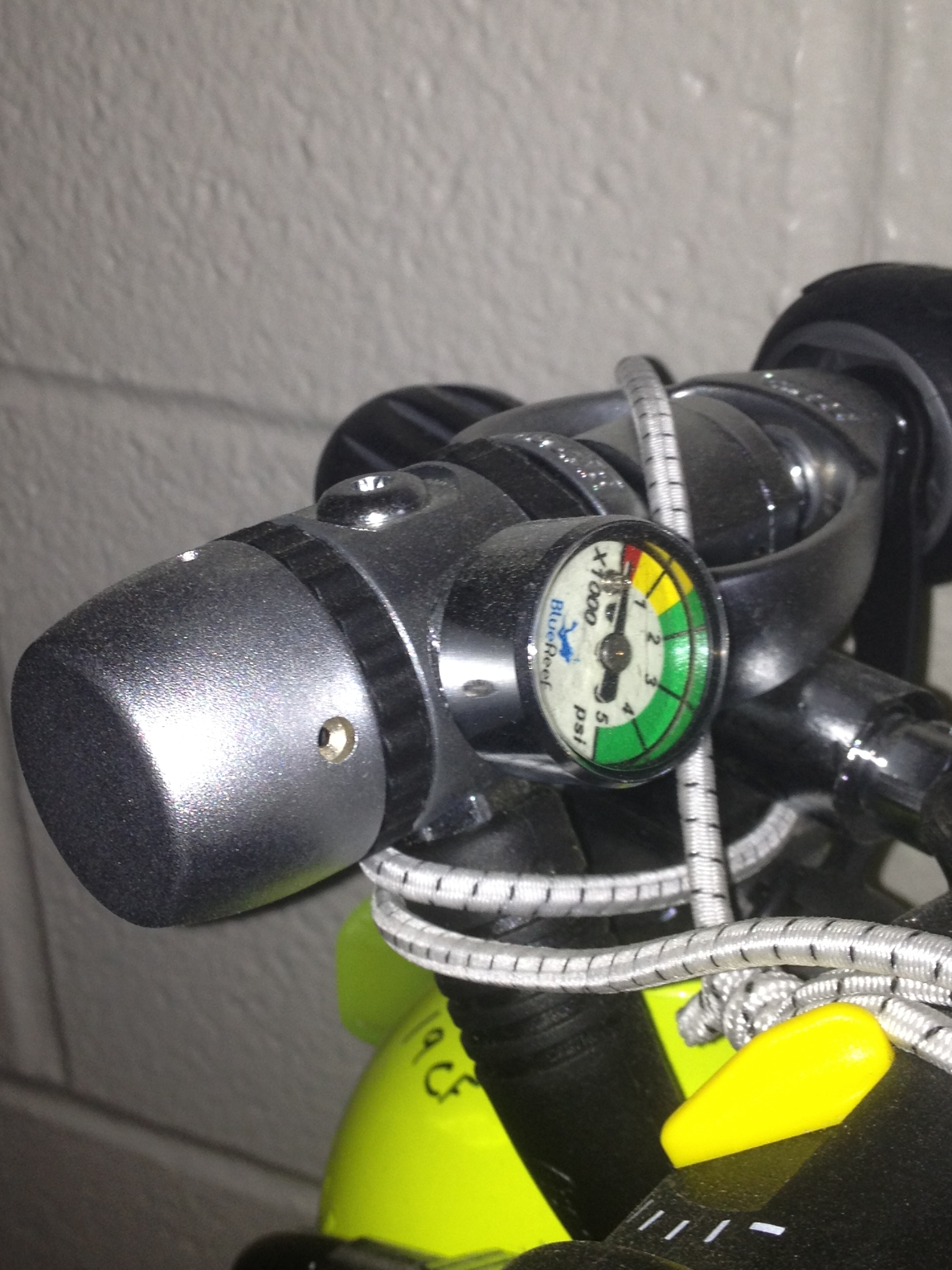
Button gauge

These are coin-sized analog pressure gauges directly mounted to a high-pressure port on the first stage. They are compact, have no dangling hoses, and few points of failure. They are generally not used on back mounted cylinders because the diver cannot see them there when underwater. They are sometimes used on side slung stage cylinders. Due to their small size, it can be difficult to read the gauge to a resolution of less than 20 bars (300 psi). As they are rigidly mounted to the first stage there is no flexibility in the connection, and they may be vulnerable to impact damage.

==== Air integrated computers ====
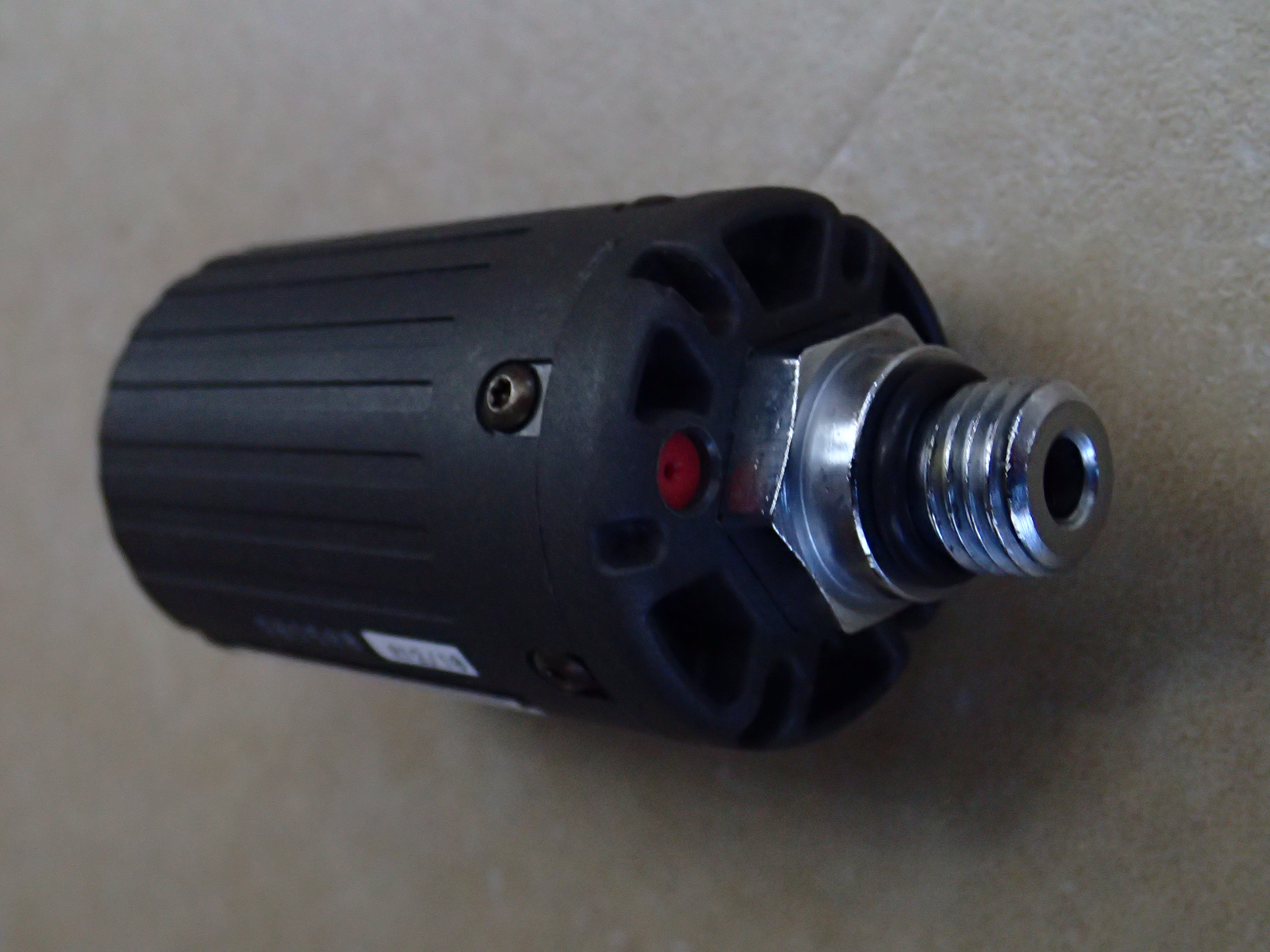
Submersible wireless pressure transducer for remote dive computer display

Some dive computers are designed to measure, display, and monitor pressure in the diving cylinder. This can be very beneficial to the diver, but if the dive computer fails the diver can no longer monitor his or her gas reserves. Most divers using a gas-integrated computer will also have a standard air pressure gauge, though, the SPG and hose have several potential points of failure. The computer is either connected to the first stage by a high pressure hose, or has two parts - the pressure transducer on the first stage and the display at the wrist or console, which communicate by wireless data transmission link; the signals are encoded to eliminate the risk of one diver's computer picking up a signal from another diver's transducer or radio interference from other sources. Some dive computers can receive a signal from more than one remote pressure transducer. The Ratio iX3M Tech and others can process and display pressures from up to 10 transmitters.

=== Handedness ===
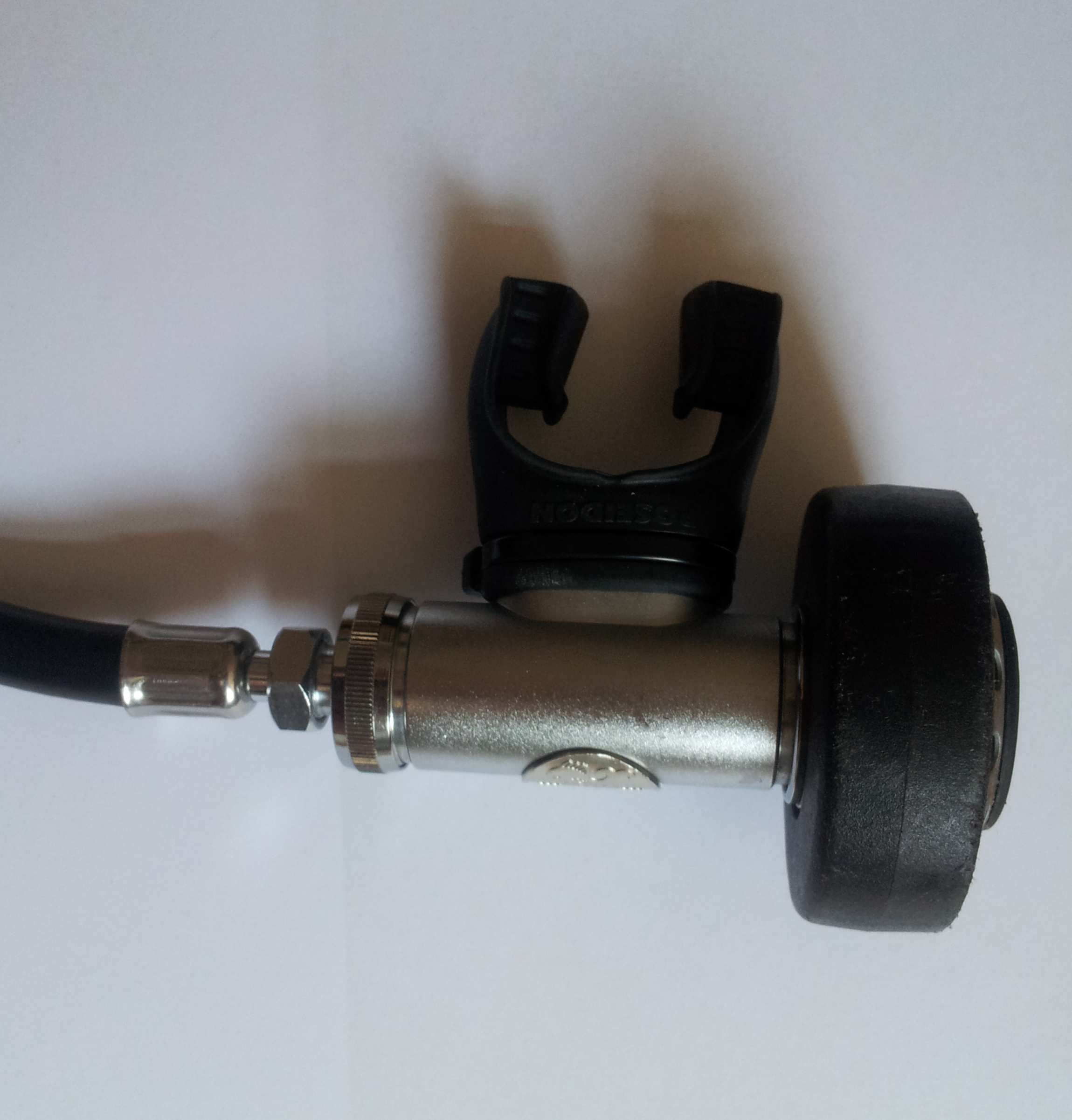
Poseidon Cyclon 5000 second stage has a side exhaust which allows it to be used with the hose approaching from either side.

Almost all single hose demand regulators are designed to be used with the hose approaching the mouth from the right hand side. In this orientation the exhaust ports are at the lowest point and drainage is effective. There are a few models, notably those made by Poseidon Diving Systems AB, but historically also from other manufacturers, which have side exhausts and work equally well in either orientation. In effect they have no functional top or bottom. They are more sensitive to lateral tilt, which can affect drainage, but is seldom a problem in practice. A few earlier models were left handed, and at least one Apeks model can be modified for left handed use by rebuilding using the original components. The Mares Loop 15x is unique in having the low pressure hose enter the second stage from the bottom, which allows it to be used with the hose routed under either arm.

=== Secondary demand valve (Octopus) ===
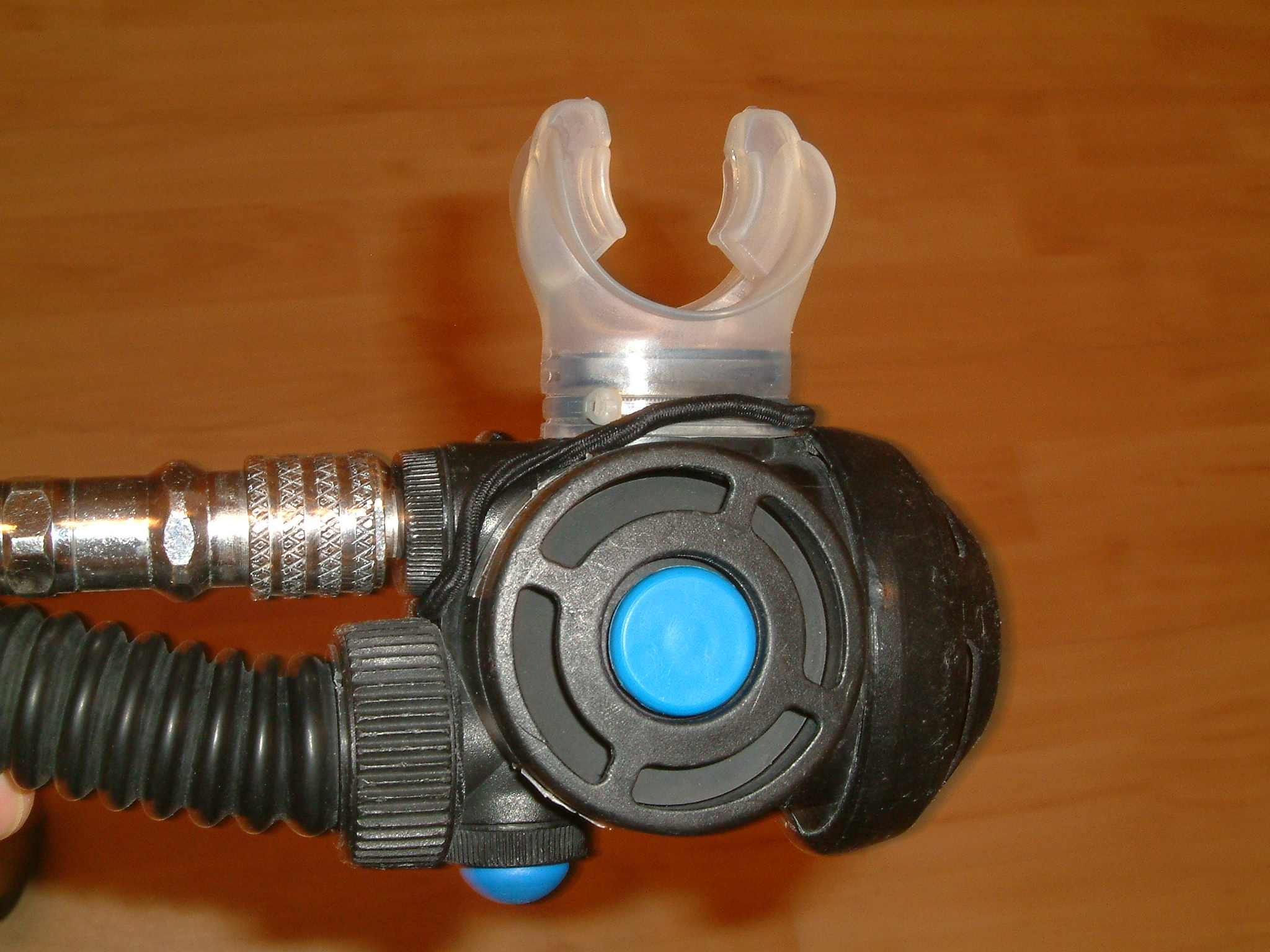
A combined diving regulator demand valve and buoyancy compensator inflation valve

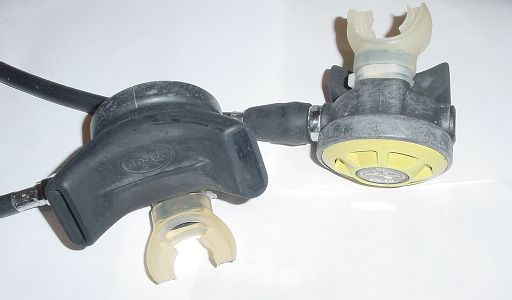
Primary and secondary (yellow) demand valves.

As a nearly universal standard practice in modern recreational diving, the typical single-hose regulator has a second demand valve fitted for emergency use, mainly for the diver's buddy, typically referred to as the octopus because of the extra hose, or secondary demand valve. The origins of the secondary demand valve are obscure, and it may have been independently invented several times, but it was used by Dave Woodward at UNEXSO around 1965–6 to support the freedive attempts of Jacques Mayol. Woodward believed that having the safety divers carry two second stages would be a safer and more practical approach than buddy breathing in the event of an emergency.

The secondary demand valve can be a hybrid of a demand valve and a buoyancy compensator inflation valve. Both types may be called alternate air sources. When the secondary demand valve is integrated with the buoyancy compensator inflation valve, since the inflation valve hose is short (usually just long enough to reach mid-chest), in the event of a diver running out of air, the diver with air remaining would give their primary second stage to the out-of-air diver, and switch to their own integrated inflation valve.

A demand valve on a regulator connected to a separate independent diving cylinder can also be called an alternate air source, and is also a fully redundant air source, as it is totally independent of the primary air source, which has safety advantages.

==== Configuration ====
The low pressure hose on the secondary demand valve is usually longer than the low pressure hose on the primary DV that the diver uses, and the secondary DV and/or its hose may be colored yellow to aid in locating it in an emergency. The secondary regulator should be clipped to the diver's harness in a position where it can be easily seen and reached by both the diver and the potential sharer of air, with a breakaway connection. The longer hose is used for convenience when sharing air, so that the divers are not forced to stay in an awkward position relative to each other. Technical divers frequently extend this feature and use a 5-foot or 7-foot (1.5 m or 2 m) hose, which allows divers to swim in single file while sharing air, which may be necessary in restricted spaces inside wrecks or caves.

In the most common recreational configuration, divers wear the secondary demand valve on the right side, ready for rapid deployment if the buddy runs out of breathing gas. According to an article on the Divers Alert website, the arrangement was originally for the secondary DV to be worn and be deployed on the left side, which allows a standard right handed DV to be used by the recipient without a reverse bend in the hose, which takes maximum advantage of hose length. There is little reliable documentation on whether this was the case, and if so, why it was changed. A comparison of the left and right mountings with reference to the primary function as an emergency gas supply shows some ergonomic advantages the left mount option. These comparisons do not apply with the long hose and necklace or with BCD inflator integrated systems, or with DVs with side exhaust which work upside down.

Advantages claimed for the left side mounting are: It is easier to hand off to another diver, using the left hand, and leaving the right hand free, it does not put an additional bend in the hose, which makes better use of the available length, and gives a smooth unstressed lead for face to face sharing and receiver to the left parallel positioning. Face to face positioning allows eye contact, which is useful during ascent, and side by side is useful if the return requires horizontal travel. The purge button is more accessible to the rescuer, as it is on the thumb side of the donating hand. Disadvantages are that it is an awkward arrangement if the diver needs to use it themself, as the hose then needs to be routed round the back of the head, or it may develop a tight bend putting stress on the jaw. It may also lead to confusion if the receiver has only been exposed to right handed donation.

=== Mouthpiece ===
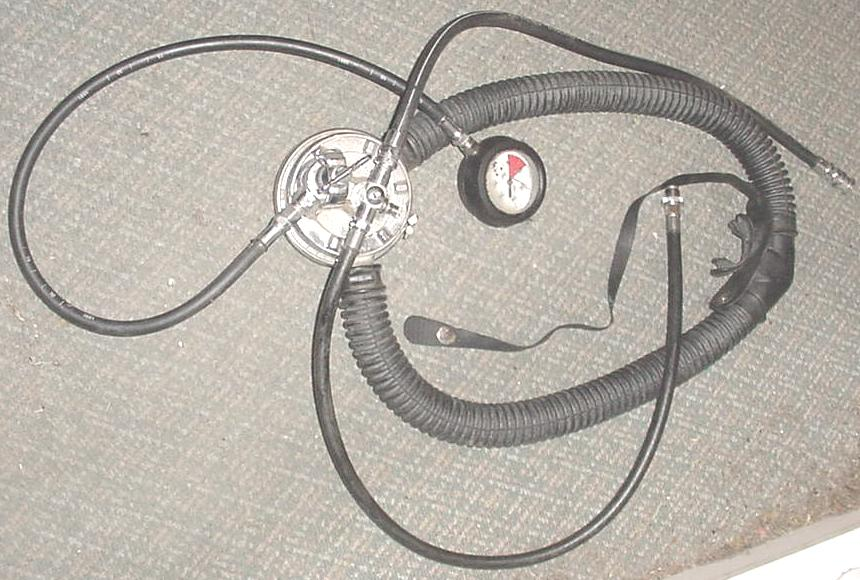
Nemrod twin-hose diving regulator made in the 1980s. Its mouthpiece is fitted with a neck strap.

The mouthpiece is a part that the user grips in the mouth to make a watertight seal. It is a short flattened-oval tube that goes in between the lips, with a curved flange that fits between the lips and the teeth and gums, and seals against the inner surface of the lips. On the inner ends of the flange there are two tabs with enlarged ends, which are gripped between the teeth. These tabs also keep the teeth apart sufficiently to allow comfortable breathing through the gap. Most recreational diving regulators are fitted with a mouthpiece. In twin-hose regulators and rebreathers, "mouthpiece" may refer to the whole assembly between the two flexible tubes. A mouthpiece prevents clear speech, so a full-face mask is preferred where voice communication is needed.

In a few models of scuba regulator the mouthpiece also has an outer rubber flange that fits outside the lips and extends into two straps that fasten together behind the neck. This helps to keep the mouthpiece in place if the user's jaws go slack through unconsciousness or distraction. The mouthpiece safety flange may also be a separate component. The attached neck strap also allows the diver to keep the regulator hanging under the chin where it is protected and ready for use. Recent mouthpieces do not usually include an external flange, but the practice of using a neck strap has been revived by technical divers who use a bungee or surgical rubber "necklace" which can come off the mouthpiece without damage if pulled firmly.

The original mouthpieces were usually made from natural rubber and could cause an allergic reaction in some divers. This has been overcome by the use of hypo-allergenic synthetic elastomers such as silicone rubbers.

=== Swivel hose adaptors ===
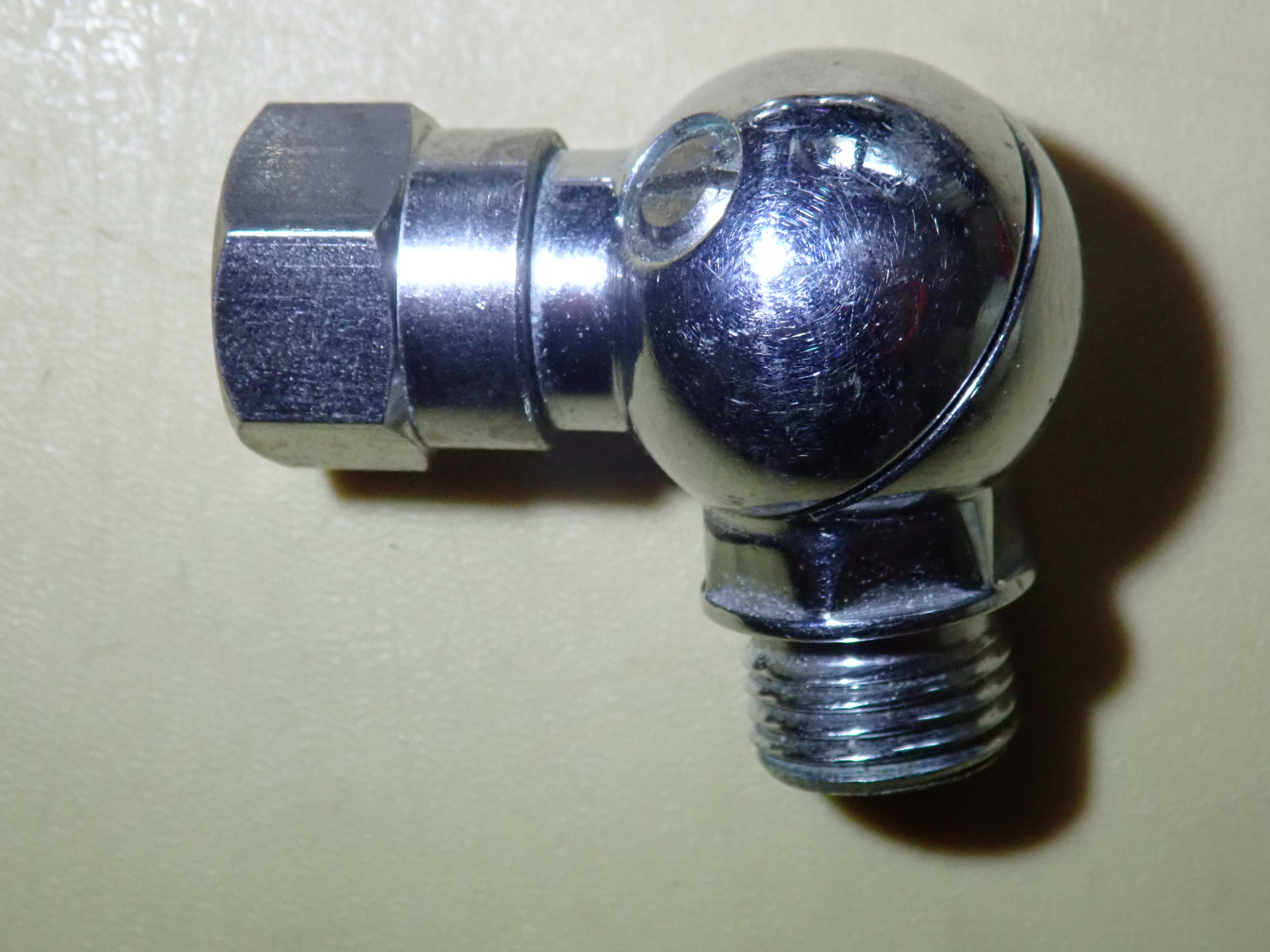
Hose adaptor to allow adjustable sharp bend at connection to demand valve

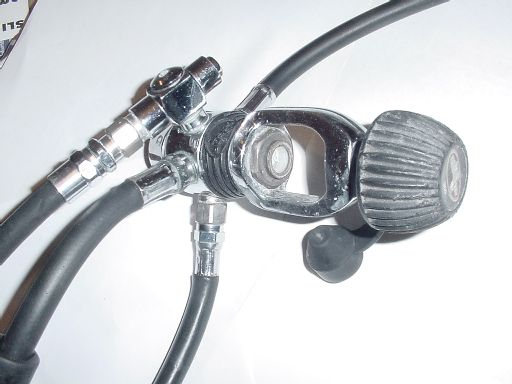
A diving regulator first stage with A-clamp connector and 90-degree swivel on one hose

Adaptors are available to modify the lead of the low pressure hose where it attaches to the demand valve. There are adaptors which provide a fixed angle and those which are variable while in use. Other swivel adaptors are made to be fitted between the low pressure hose and low pressure port on the first stage to provide hose leads otherwise not possible for the specific regulator. As with all additional moving parts, they are an additional possible point of failure, so should only be used where there is sufficient advantage to offset this risk. They are mainly useful to improve the hose lead on regulators used with sidemount and sling mounted cylinders.

=== Full-face mask or helmet ===
This is stretching the concept of accessory a bit, as it would be equally valid to call the regulator an accessory of the full face mask or helmet, but the two items are closely connected and generally found in use together.

Most full face masks and probably most diving helmets currently in use are open circuit demand systems, using a demand valve (in some cases more than one) and supplied from a scuba regulator or a surface supply umbilical from a surface supply panel using a surface supply regulator to control the pressure of primary and reserve air or other breathing gas.

Lightweight demand diving helmets are almost always surface supplied, but full face masks are used equally appropriately with scuba open circuit, scuba closed circuit (rebreathers), and surface supplied open circuit.

The demand valve is usually firmly attached to the helmet or mask, but there are a few models of full face mask that have removable demand valves with quick connections allowing them to be exchanged under water. These include the Dräger Panorama and Kirby-Morgan 48 Supermask.

==== Positive pressure ====
For some applications it is desirable for the gas inside the mask or helmet to remain at a pressure slightly above ambient at all times while in the water, as this will prevent any contamination from leaking into the gas space during inhalation if the face or neck seal, or the exhaust valve system, does not seal perfectly. In clean water such a leak is a minor problem, but leaks of contaminated water can be a hazard to health, and even life-threatening. A positive pressure inside a free-flow helmet is easily achieved by slightly increasing the opening pressure of the exhaust valve, provided it is adjustable, but for a demand system the cracking pressure of the demand valve must also be adjusted, so that it delivers gas before the internal pressure drops below external ambient pressure. This is not difficult, as a slight adjustment to second stage valve spring pressure is all that is required. The problem is that when the mask or helmet is off the diver, and the gas supply is pressurised, the demand valve will leak continuously, and a large amount of gas can be lost. The Interspiro Divator Mk II mask has a second stage regulator which has a manual lock on the demand valve to prevent free-flow when the mask is not in use, which unlocks when a breath is taken, and must be reset when the mask is taken off.

=== Buoyancy compensator and dry suit inflation hoses ===
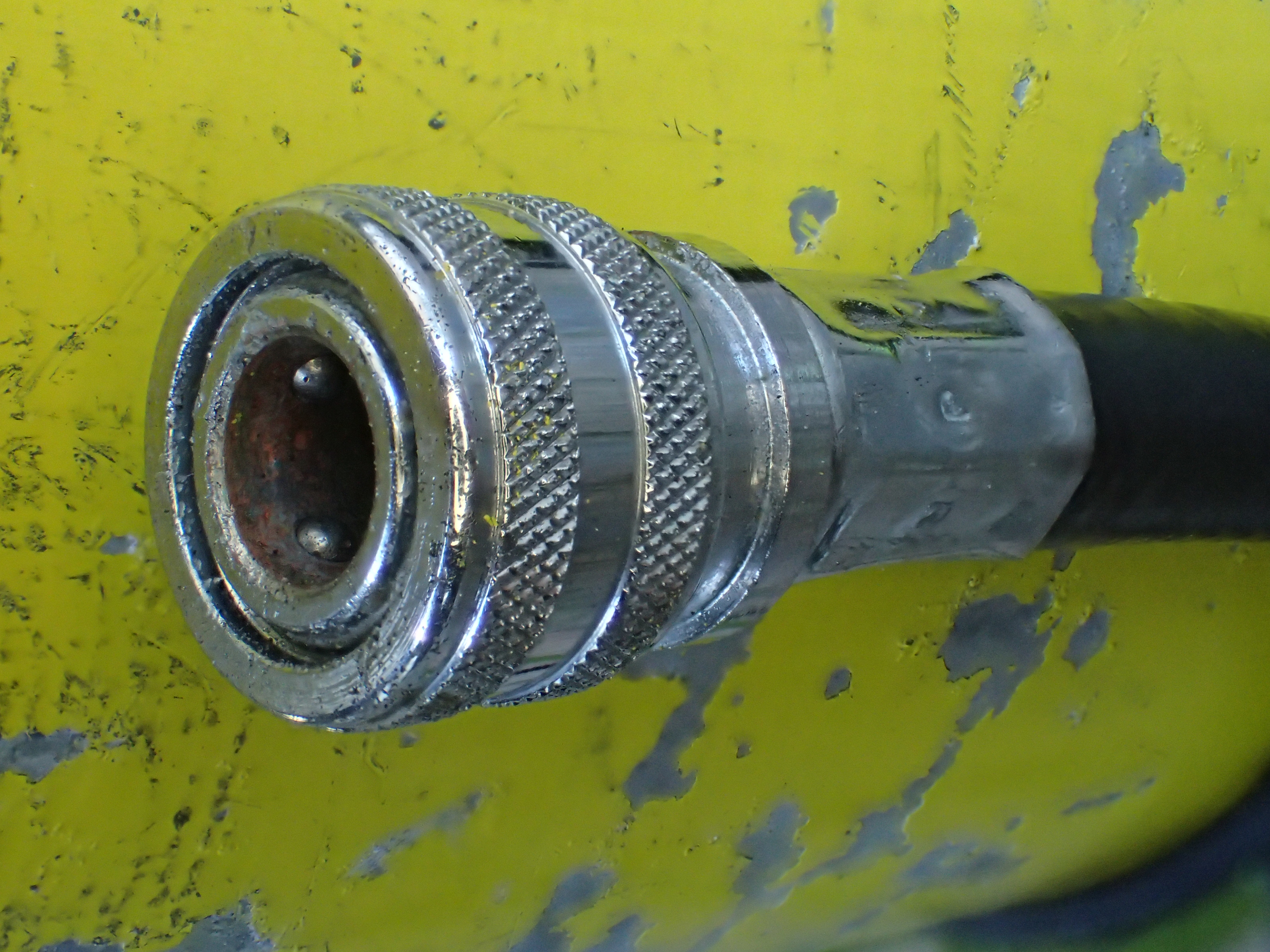
Seatec quick disconnect end fitting commonly used for dry-suit and buoyancy compensator inflation

Low pressure inflation hose with CEJN 221 connector (right) used for some dry suits

Hoses may be fitted to low pressure ports of the regulator first stage to provide gas for inflating buoyancy compensators and/or dry suits. These hoses usually have a quick-connector end with an automatically sealing valve which blocks flow if the hose is disconnected from the buoyancy compensator or suit. There are two basic styles of connector, which are not compatible with each other. The high flow rate CEJN 221 fitting has a larger bore and allows gas flow at a fast enough rate for use as a connector to a demand valve. This is sometimes seen in a combination BC inflator/deflator mechanism with integrated secondary DV (octopus), such as in the AIR II unit from Scubapro. The low flow rate Seatec connector is more common and is the industry standard for BC inflator connectors, and is also popular on dry suits, as the limited flow rate reduces the risk of a blow-up if the valve sticks open. The high flow rate connector is used by some manufacturers on dry suits.

Various minor accessories are available to fit these hose connectors. These include interstage pressure gauges, which are used to troubleshoot and tune the regulator (not for use underwater), noisemakers, used to attract attention underwater and on the surface, and valves for inflating tires and inflatable boat floats, making the air in a scuba cylinder available for other purposes.

=== Instrument consoles ===
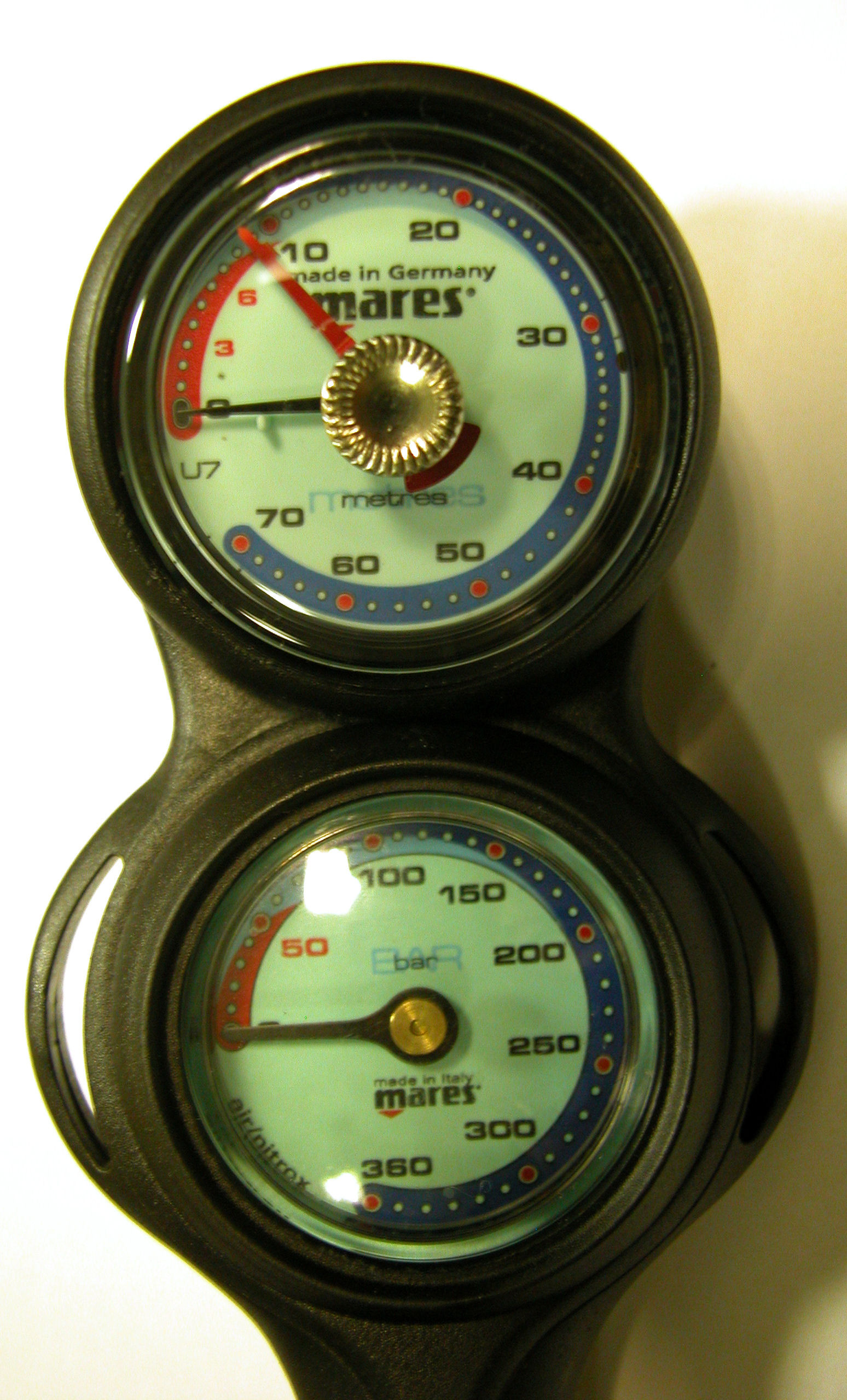
Console with pressure gauge and analog depth gauge

Also called combo consoles, these are usually hard rubber or tough plastic moldings which enclose the submersible pressure gauge and have mounting sockets for other diver instrumentation, such as decompression computers, underwater compass, timer and/or depth gauge and occasionally a small plastic slate on which notes can be written either before or during the dive. These instruments would otherwise be carried somewhere else such as strapped to the wrist or forearm or in a pocket and are only regulator accessories for convenience of transport and access, and at greater risk of damage during handling.

=== Automatic closure device ===
The auto-closure device (ACD) is a mechanism for closing off the inlet opening of a regulator first stage when it is disconnected from a cylinder. A spring-loaded plunger in the inlet is mechanically depressed by contact with the cylinder valve when the regulator is fitted to the cylinder, which opens the port through which air flows into the regulator. In the normally closed condition when not mounted, this valve prevents ingress of water and other contaminants to the first stage interior which could be caused by negligent handling of the equipment or by accident. This is claimed by the manufacturer to extend the service life of the regulator and reduce risk of failure due to internal contamination. However, it is possible for an incorrectly installed ACD to shut off gas supply from a cylinder still containing gas during a dive, and water or other contaminants held in the cylinder valve outlet will not be prevented from entering the first stage.

=== Breathing gas heating ===
Surface supplied divers operating for long periods in cold water, or using helium based breathing gas mixtures, commonly use a hot-water suit to maintain body temperature. Part of the water used to heat the suit can be routed through a water jacket (shroud) around part of the breathing gas supply tubing on the helmet, typically the metal tube between the bailout valve block and the demand valve inlet. This heats the gas just before delivery through the demand valve, and as a large part of body heat loss is in heating the inspired air to body temperature on every breath, which is proportional to breathing rate and gas density, this can reduce heat loss significantly on deep dives in cold water.

== Gas compatibility ==
=== Recreational scuba nitrox service ===
Standard air regulators are considered to be suitable for nitrox mixtures containing 40% or less oxygen by volume, both by NOAA, which conducted extensive testing to verify this, and by most recreational diving agencies.

=== Surface supplied nitrox service ===
When surface supplied equipment is used the diver does not have the option of simply taking out the DV and switching to an independent system, and gas switching may be done during a dive, including use of pure oxygen for accelerated decompression. To reduce the risk of confusion or getting the system contaminated, surface supplied systems may be required to be oxygen clean for all services except straight air diving.

=== Oxygen service ===
Regulators to be used with pure oxygen and nitrox mixtures containing more than 40% oxygen by volume should use oxygen compatible components and lubricants, and be cleaned for oxygen service.

=== Helium service ===
Helium is an exceptionally nonreactive gas and breathing gases containing helium do not require any special cleaning or lubricants. However, as helium is generally used for deep dives, it will normally be used with high performance regulators, with low work of breathing at high ambient pressures when the gas is relatively dense.

== Manufacturers and their brands ==
- Air Liquide: La Spirotechnique (now Aqualung, under the Head Sport group)
- American Underwater Products (ROMI Enterprises, of San Leandro, Calif.): Aeris (scuba), which has merged with Oceanic in 2014.Hollis Gear and Oceanic Worldwide
- Atomic Aquatics, American manufacturer of diving regulators and basic diving equipment. The company was acquired by Huish Outdoors in September 2011.
- Beuchat – French manufacturer of underwater diving equipment
- Cressi-Sub – Italian manufacturer of water sports equipment
- Dive Rite
- Dräger – German manufacturer of breathing equipment
- Halcyon Diving System
- Head Sport: Apeks, Aqualung, Dacor (discontinued) and Mares
- Poseidon Diving Systems AB
- ScubaPro – American manufacturer of scuba equipment
- Seac Sub
- Tusa
- Tecline
- Zeagle

== See also ==
- Breathing performance of regulators – Capacity of breathing regulators to function as specified
- Built-in breathing system – System for supply of breathing gas on demand within a confined space
- Diving helmet – Rigid head enclosure for underwater diving
- Full-face diving mask – Diving mask that covers the mouth as well as the eyes and nose
- Human factors in diving equipment design – Influence of the interaction between the user and the equipment on design
- Mechanism of diving regulators – Arrangement and function of the components of regulators for underwater diving
