= Freeflow =

Continuous flow of breathing gas in an underwater breathing apparatus

Freeflow (also free flow and free-flow) in underwater diving apparatus is a continuous flow of gas from a storage or supply unit. In scuba diving it is usually undesirable and considered a malfunction and a hazard, while in surface supplied diving it may be a malfunction or a user selected option in demand systems, or the standard mode of operation in freeflow systems.

== Freeflow systems ==
A freeflow diving gas supply has a continuous flow of breathing gas to the diver's helmet, or in some cases, full-face mask. The gas flows regardless of whether the diver breathes it, and most of the gas supply is not used. This is wasteful, so is generally only used when the breathing gas is air, which is cheap, and can be supplied from a low pressure compressor. Freeflow helmets were used in early diving apparatus, such as the historically important standard diving dress with the copper helmet. The system is simple and robust, and relatively safe in contaminated water as the internal pressure of the helmet can be maintained at a slightly higher setting than the external pressure to prevent leaks back through the exhaust valve.

== Demand surface supplied systems ==
Lightweight diving helmets and bandmasks usually use a demand controlled breathing gas supply as the standard mode, as it is more economical on gas consumption - the amount of gas supplied is the amount needed for the diver's respiratory requirements. However, there may be a freeflow valve to provide gas at a constant flow at a rate determined by the valve which is operated by the diver. One of the functions of freeflow supply is to defog the faceplate. Another is for breathing gas supply in case of demand valve malfunction, and a third is to assist with clearing water from a leaking helmet, or to prevent inflow through a leaking exhaust port or neck seal. The demand valve of a lightweight helmet can also freeflow for some of the same reasons as can happen with a scuba demand valve.

== Open circuit scuba ==
In scuba diving, a freeflow occurs when the diving regulator continues to supply air instead of cutting off the supply when the diver stops inhaling, or starts to flow when out of the diver's mouth due to a pressure difference over the diaphragm or a bump to the purge button, and continues to flow due to the "venturi effect" of reduced internal pressure caused by high flow velocity of the escaping air. If the freeflow is caused by a "venturi effect", simply closing the mouthpiece over will stop it immediately.

Sometimes the freeflow will not stop when the backpressure is increased. This may be caused by very cold water freezing the first or second stage valve open, or a malfunction of either the first or second stages. If the freeflow is caused by freezing it will generally not be corrected except by closing the cylinder valve and allowing the ice to thaw, which requires an alternative air supply to breathe from while the valve is closed. As long as the freeflow continues, the refrigerating effect of the air expanding through the valves will keep the ice frozen, and air will continue to escape until either the cylinder valve is closed, or the cylinder is empty.

In demand valves where the cracking pressure is adjustable by the diver, it may also occur as a result of maladjustment of the cracking pressure ("dial a breath") knob. In these cases the freeflow can usually be eliminated by adjusting the setting.

Other freeflows may be caused by the second stage valve jamming due to grit or corrosion products fouling the movement of the valve poppet, or the purge button sticking in the depressed position. These can sometimes be stopped by pressing the purge button a few times to free up the works. If all else fails, the diver can breathe from a freeflowing demand valve by allowing excess air to escape from the sides of the mouth and the exhaust valve, which may allow a safe ascent, or at least the use of as much remaining gas as possible. When a full-face mask is used, excess gas will be vented through the exhaust valve and around the mask skirt, usually allowing the diver to continue to breathe without difficulty during the freeflow. This does not help after the cylinder has emptied.

If the diver can comfortably reach the cylinder valve, which is usually the case for side mount or sling cylinders, the cylinder valve can be opened and closed manually to control air flow while breathing during the ascent or exit, which will allow more of it to be breathed, and less wasted. This procedure is known as feather breathing.

== See also ==
- Purge button – Manual activation control of the demand valve
- Mechanism of diving regulators – Arrangement and function of the components of regulators for underwater diving
- Regulator freezing – Locking of a diving regulator by ice formation
