= Ted Eldred =

Australian inventor of the single hose diving regulator

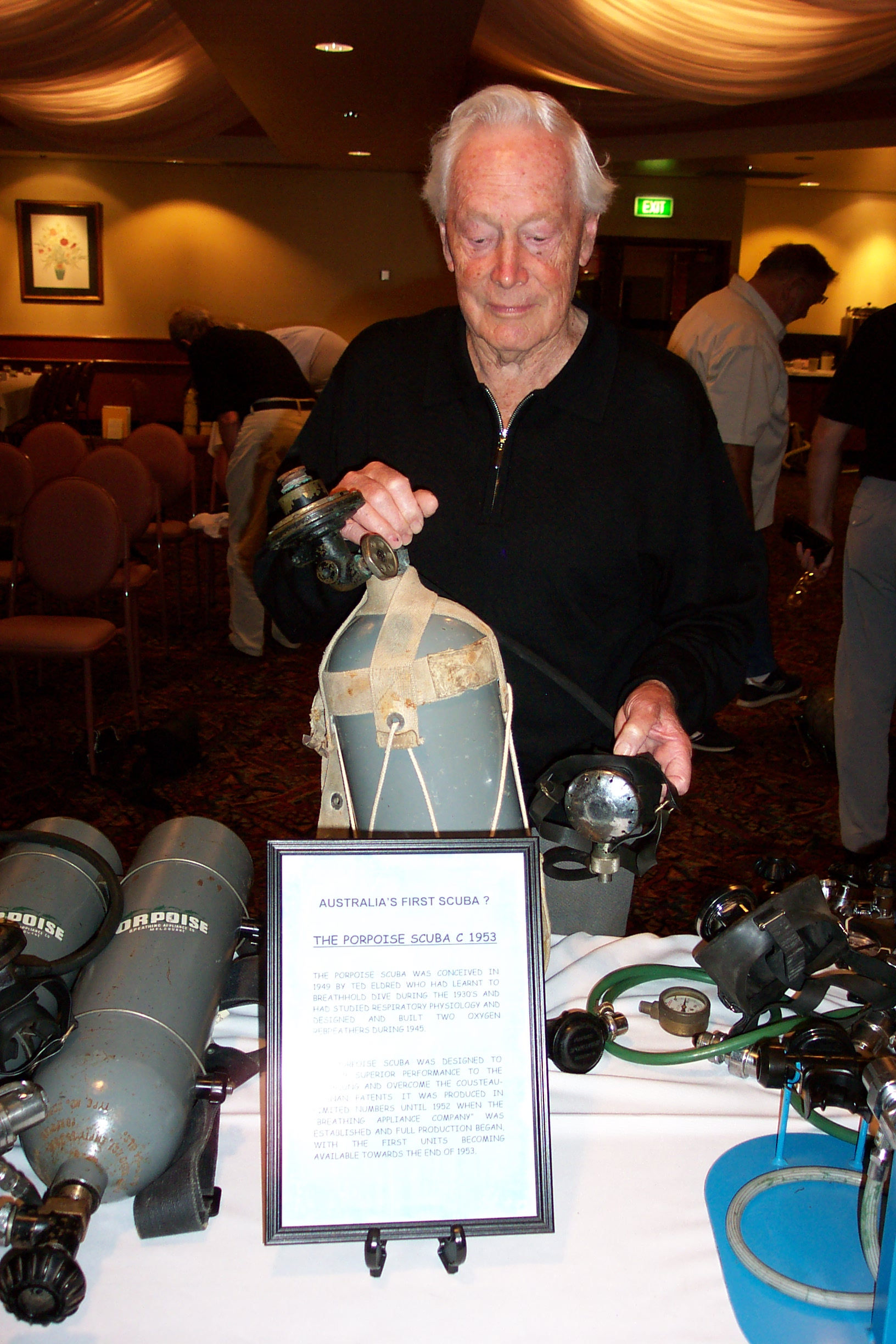
- Ted Eldred in 2003 with an example of the world's first commercially available, single hose scuba unit, which was released early in 1952.
- Born: Edward Francis Eldred; 16 December 1920; Melbourne, Victoria, Australia
- Died: August 2005 (aged 84); Yarck, Victoria, Australia

Edward Francis Eldred (16 December 1920 to August 2005) was a pioneer of scuba diving in Australia. He invented Porpoise scuba gear.

== Early years ==
Eldred was born in Melbourne in 1920. As a young man he lived by the sea near Sorrento on the Mornington Peninsula south of Melbourne. He started snorkelling as soon as mask, fins and snorkel were available, and wished that he could make or obtain some sort of free-swimming breathing set, until World War II intervened. After World War II in the late 1940s he designed a sport diving oxygen rebreather. Eldred said he had never dived with the Cousteau-Gagnan model of the Aqua Lung, but knew of its existence and its principle. The Aqua Lung was protected by patent and difficult to obtain in Australia. Siebe Gorman had the license to manufacture for Commonwealth countries and could not meet demands. When Eldred decided that rebreathers were not suitable for general sport use, he shifted his focus to developing the world's first single-hose open-circuit scuba set, both with tradename "Porpoise".

== Closed-circuit oxygen rebreathers ==
Eldred's initial efforts were to make an oxygen rebreather safe for sporting use. Pure oxygen used in early rebreathers causes CNS poisoning below 6 msw. Eldred reasoned that the rebreather should be designed to stop flowing oxygen when the diver descended below that depth. At a demonstration by the Flinders pier, on Western Port Bay, south east of Melbourne, a diver passed out because he failed to purge the system of air. This failure to purge had resulted in a nitrogen build up. Eldred realised at this point that he needed to turn his efforts toward open circuit compressed air breathing apparatus. He was accompanied on this demonstration by Bob Wallace-Mitchell, who would become his distributor.

== Open-circuit compressed air ==
The French-designed open circuit scuba, called the Aqua-Lung, was protected by US and international patents, so Eldred set about designing the Porpoise CA (a prototype), the world's first single hose regulator. Eldred referred to the French model as the Gagnan Aqua Lung, as designer Émile Gagnan was the Frenchman who actually designed the device for Jacques Cousteau. This new design was superior to the Aqua-Lung, and did not violate any of the existing patents. Eldred's regulator was never patented as his business was too small for the expense. The first production model was designated the CA-1. (C A for compressed air, 1 for single cylinder) He began using an oxygen welding reduction valve for his prototype. His chief design effort was developing the demand valve which people now call the second stage. It was sold as a complete single cylinder, single hose scuba early in 1952. The cylinder was inverted so the diver could reach the innovative regulator mounted reserve. Only about a dozen of these exist and are now in the hands of scuba collectors. Eldred also made the CA-2, which was a double cylinder model. Only two CA-2 Porpoises are still known to exist. About three quarters of the Porpoises made were surface supplied 'hookah' units. The 'hookah' was the device which started the demise of the standard dress helmet diving equipment. The Porpoise single hose scuba found its initial international praise in Arthur C. Clarke's 1955 book Coast of Coral. Clarke brought two French Mistrals to Australia, but set them aside when he was loaned two Porpoises for his Australian adventure by Eldred. They are illustrated in Clarke's book.

Eldred's company was called Breathing Appliances Pty Ltd and located at 70 Abbotsford St., North Melbourne. His marketing was done by his friend Bob Wallace-Mitchell. It was difficult for Wallace-Mitchell to market in those early days, as compressed air was not readily available. His first task was to locate a compressor with a sales point in each of the Australian capital cities. Once this was done, dealers could stock his scuba and refill the cylinders. In 1954 Eldred also created the Porpoise Universal, which had a high supply rate of over 300 liters per minute. The Universal used the same demand valve and was modular in design. The reduction valve was a balanced diaphragm type, which was modified to become a piston type. It became his flagship model. Eldred also made a cheaper model, called the Sportsman. The Sportsman was a very compact regulator with innovative features now found on regulators of today. It was made of plastic and had an unbalanced first stage. Market needs made this model necessary, but Eldred did not like it.

The Royal Australian Navy (RAN) supported Eldred's efforts and adopted the Porpoise Universal for military use. The RAN became the first navy to be equipped with single hose scuba. Eldred's diving school was established by RAN Commander Maurice "Batts" Batterham, GM. It was the first SCUBA diving school in Australia and the first in the world to teach with the single hose regulator — it was located at the Melbourne City Baths. It was a course designed to promote the new Porpoise, but later other brands of scuba were also used. The school continued for about ten years, later sending its students to the newer Associated Divers Academy which taught at the YMCA. The Australian government was still sensitive about the attempted invasion by the Japanese. They supported the course by allowing Batterham to conduct it and they kept a record of those who attended. This gave them a conscription base should hostilities ever occur again.

In 1960 the French firm L'Air Liquide, which owned U.S. Divers Corp., and the patent to the Aqua-Lung, bought Eldred out, under threat of flooding his market with their products. The Porpoise continued to be marketed under the name Australian Divers Spiro Pty. Ltd. Eldred worked for them for a time, but eventually left diving behind, discouraged by this experience. Later Australian Divers Spiro ceased production of all of the Porpoise models, but had to continue to supply the RAN because of an existing contract. The last Porpoise sold was the RAN variation of the Porpoise Universal in 1976. About 12,000 Porpoise units were produced, but only a few dozen of all models are known to exist today. The more common French Aqua-Lung was produced in far larger numbers, with 12,000 being made in a single month. Today the French design is considered obsolete, while the Australian concept is made and used world wide.

Ted Eldred was recognised in later life, by the Historical Divers Society (South-East Asia Pacific), as the inventor of the first successful commercially produced single hose SCUBA. Eldred made his last dive with his grandson Adam, at an event in Ted Eldred's honor. The single hose SCUBA is the type in use around the world today. Eldred was presented the first "Ted Eldred Award" for significant contributions to diving by the Historical Diving Society (SEAP). When Eldred died, he did not have a single complete Porpoise left. The Historical Diving Society (SEAP), presented a working Porpoise to Eldred's son Tony, so that the family would have an example of Ted Eldred's achievements.

Ted Eldred died of cardiac arrest at his Yarck, Victoria country home, in August 2005. He was survived by a son and a daughter.
