= Snorkel (swimming) =

Tube for breathing face down at the surface of the water

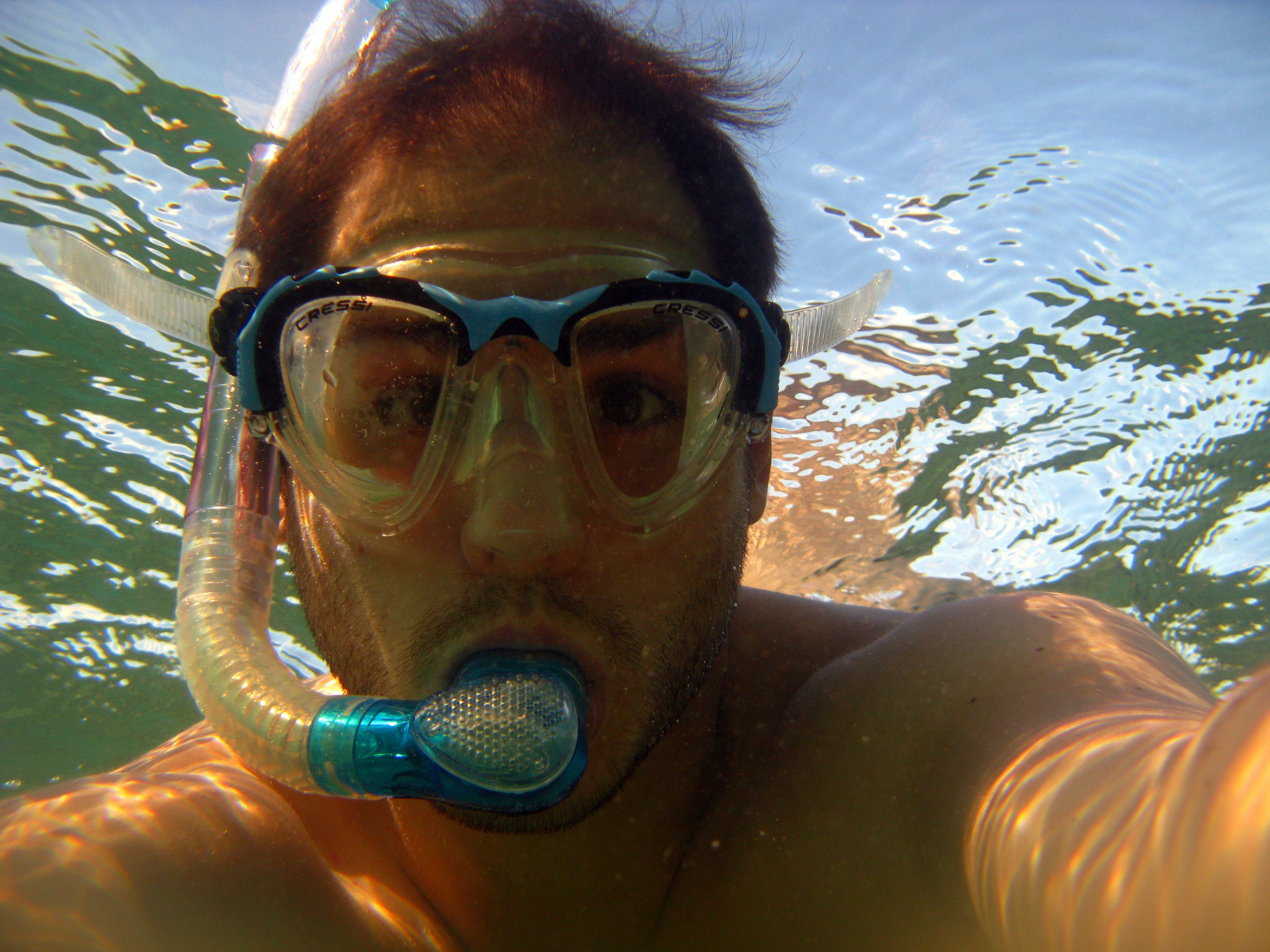
- Snorkel, worn with diving half mask
- Uses: Breathing while face down at the surface of the water
- Related items: Diving mask, Swimming goggles

A snorkel is a device used for breathing atmospheric air when the wearer's head is face downward in the surface water with the mouth and the nose submerged. It may be either a separate unit, or integrated into a swimming or diving mask. The integrated version is only suitable for surface snorkeling, while the separate device may also be used for surface breathing during breathhold underwater activities such as spearfishing, freediving, finswimming, underwater hockey, underwater rugby and for surface breathing while wearing scuba equipment. A standard snorkel is a curved tube with a shape usually resembling the letter "L" or "J", fitted with a mouthpiece at the lower end and made from plastic, synthetic elastomers, rubber, or light metal. The snorkel may have a loop or a clip to attach it to the head strap of the diving mask or swimming goggles, or may be tucked between the mask-strap and the head, or may be provided with its own head strap. Some snorkels are fitted with a float valve at the top to prevent flooding if the top opening is immersed, and some are fitted with a water trap and purge valve, intended for draining water from the tube.

The current European Standard specifies limits for length, bore and internal volume for separate snorkels. Some types of integrated mask-snorkel combinations and anti-flooding valves are banned from manufacture and sale in some countries as unsafe.

Snorkels constitute respiratory dead space. When the user takes in a fresh breath, some of the previously exhaled air which remains in the snorkel is inhaled again, reducing the amount of fresh air in the inhaled volume, and increasing the risk of a buildup of carbon dioxide in the blood, which can result in hypercapnia. The greater the volume of the tube, and the smaller the tidal volume of breathing, the more this problem is exacerbated. Including the internal volume of the mask in the breathing circuit greatly increases the dead space unless a one-way circuit is used. Occasional exhalation through the nose while snorkeling with a separate snorkel will slightly reduce the buildup of carbon dioxide, and may help in keeping the mask clear of water, but in cold water it will increase fogging of the mask's viewport. To some extent the effect of dead space can be counteracted by breathing more deeply, as this reduces the dead space ratio.

== History ==
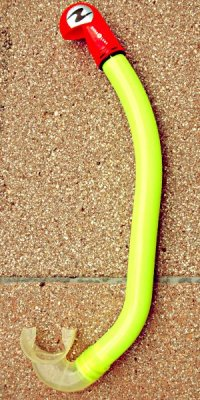
Side-mounted underwater swimmer's snorkel

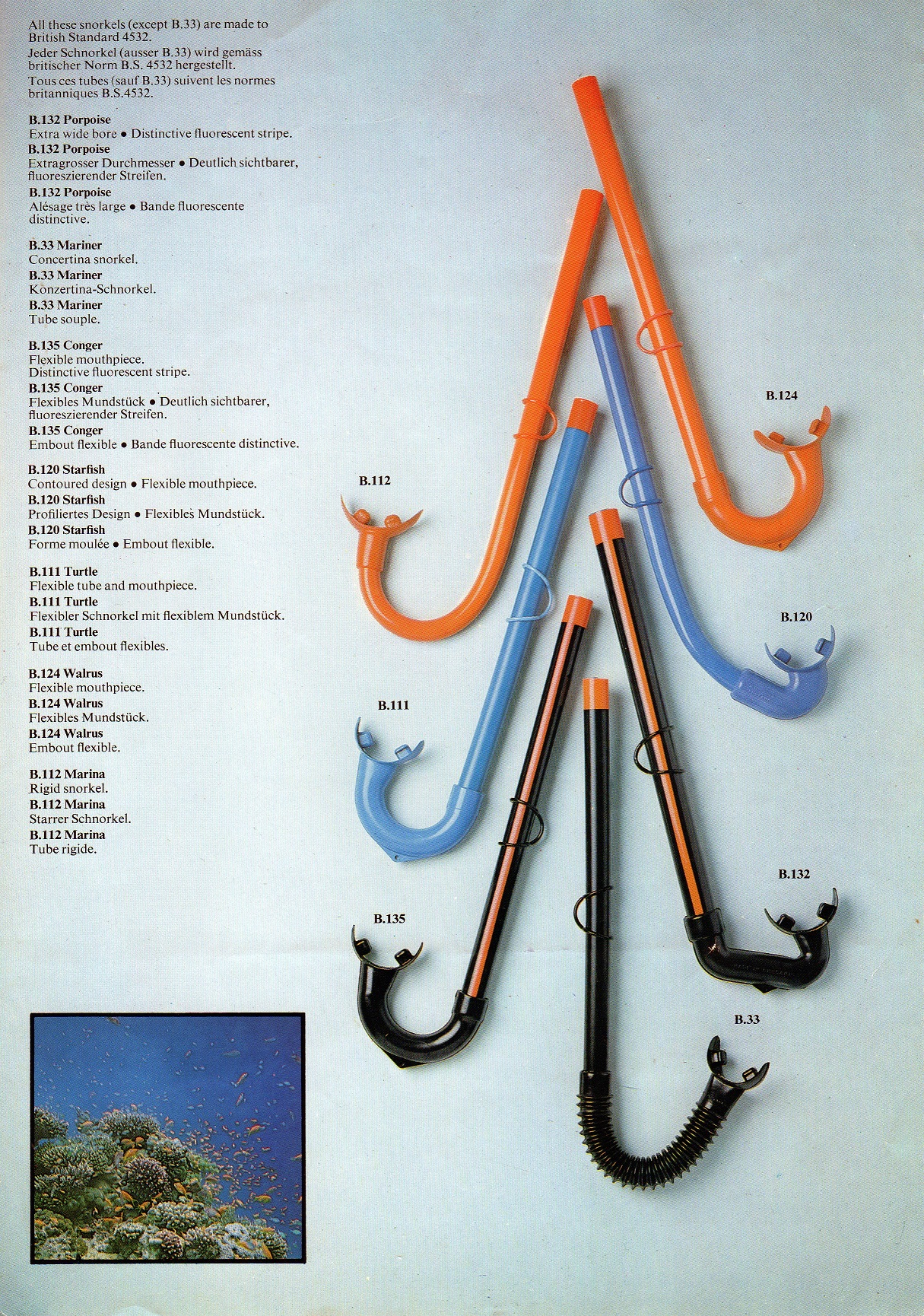
A range of 1970s snorkels made to British Standard BS 4532

Breathing surface air through a tube was mentioned by Aristotle in his Parts of Animals. He referred to divers using "instruments for respiration" resembling the elephant's trunk. Some evidence suggests that snorkeling may have originated in Crete some 5,000 years ago as sponge divers used hollowed out reeds to submerge and retrieve natural sponge for use in trade and commerce, though more recent breathhold sponge-diving practice used the skandalopetra diving weight system. In the fifteenth century, Leonardo da Vinci drew designs for an underwater breathing device consisting of cane tubes with a mask to cover the mouth at the diver end and a float to keep the tubes above water at the surface end. The following timeline traces the history of the swimmers' snorkel during the twentieth and twenty-first centuries.

1927
First use of swimmer's breathing tube and mask. According to Gilbert Doukan's 1957 World Beneath the Waves and cited elsewhere, "In 1927, and during each summer from 1927 to 1930, on the beach of La Croix-Valmer, Jacques O'Marchal [sic] ( "Jacques Aumaréchal" is the name of a 1932 French swim mask patentee) could be seen using the first face mask and the first breathing tube. He exhibited them, in fact, in 1931, at the International Nautical Show. On his feet, moreover, he wore the first 'flippers' designed by Louis de Corlieu, the use of which was to become universal."
1929
First swimmers' breathing tube patent application filed. On 9 December 1929, Barney B. Girden filed a patent application for a "swimming device" enabling a swimmer under instruction to be supplied with air through a tube to the mouth "whereby the wearer may devote his entire time to the mechanics of the stroke being used." His invention was registered as US patent 1,845,263 on 16 February 1932. On 30 July 1932, Joseph L. Belcher filed a patent application for "breathing apparatus" delivering air to a submerged person by suction from the surface of the water through hoses connected to a float; US patent 1,901,219 was awarded on 14 March 1933.
1938
First swimmers' mask with integrated breathing tubes. In 1938, French naval officer Yves Le Prieur introduced his "Nautilus" full-face diving mask with hoses emerging from the sides and leading upwards to an air inlet with a ball valve which opens when it is above water and closes when it is submerged. In November 1940 American spearfisherman Charles H. Wilen filed his "swimmer's mask" invention, which was granted US patent 2,317,237 of 20 April 1943. The device resembles a full-face diving mask incorporating two breathing tubes topped with valves projecting above the surface for inhalation and exhalation purposes. On 11 July 1944 he obtained US design patent 138,286 for a simpler version of this mask with a flutter valve at the bottom and a single breathing tube with a ball float valve at the top. Throughout their heyday of the 1950s and early 1960s, masks with integrated tubes appear in the inventories of American, Australian, British, Danish, French, German, Greek, Hong Kong, Israeli, Italian, Japanese, Polish, Spanish, Taiwanese, Turkish and Yugoslav swimming and diving equipment manufacturers. Meanwhile, in 1957, the US monthly product-testing magazine Consumer Reports concludes that "snorkel-masks have some value for swimmers lying on the surface while watching the depths in water free of vegetation and other similar hazards, but they are not recommended for a dive 'into the blue'". According to an underwater swimming equipment review in the British national weekly newspaper The Sunday Times in December 1973, "the mask with inbuilt snorkel is doubly dangerous (...) A ban on the manufacture and import of these masks is long overdue in Britain". In a decree of 2 August 1989, the French government suspended the manufacture, importation and marketing of ball-valve snorkel-masks. By the 2000s, just two swim masks with attached breathing tubes remained in production worldwide: the Majorca sub 107S single-snorkel model, and the Balco 558 twin-snorkel full-face model, both manufactured in Greece. In May 2014, the French Decathlon company filed its new-generation full-face snorkel-mask design, which was granted US design patent 775,722. on 3 January 2017, entering production as the "Easybreath" mask designated for surface snorkeling only.
1938
First front-mounted swimmer's breathing tube patent was filed. In December 1938, French spearfisherman Maxime Forjot and his business partner Albert Méjean filed a patent application in France for a breathing tube worn on the front of the head over a single-lens diving mask enclosing the eyes and the nose and it was granted French patent 847848 on 10 July 1939. In July 1939 Popular Science magazine published an article containing illustrations of a spearfisherman using a curved length of hosepipe as a front-mounted breathing tube and wearing a set of swimming goggles over his eyes and a pair of swimming fins on his feet. In the first French monograph on spearfishing La Chasse aux Poissons (1940), medical researcher and amateur spearfisherman Raymond Pulvénis illustrates his "Tuba", a breathing tube he designed to be worn on the front of the head over a single-lens diving mask enclosing the eyes and the nose. Francophone swimmers and divers have called their breathing tube "un tuba" ever since. In 1943, Raymond Pulvénis and his brother Roger obtain a Spanish patent for their improved breathing tube mouthpiece design. In 1956, the UK diving equipment manufacturer E. T. Skinner (Typhoon) marketed a "frontal" breathing tube with a bracket attachable to the screw at the top of an oval diving mask. Although it eventually fell out of favour with underwater swimmers, the front-mounted snorkel remains the breathing tube of choice in competitive swimming and finswimming because it improves the swimmer's hydrodynamic profile.
1939
First side-mounted swimmers' breathing tube patent filed. In December 1939, expatriate Russian spearfisherman Alexandre Kramarenko filed a patent in France for a breathing tube worn at the side of the head with a ball float valve at the top to exclude water and a flutter valve at the bottom. Kramarenko and his business partner Charles H. Wilen refiled the invention in March 1940 with the United States Patent Office, where their "underwater apparatus for swimmers" was granted US patent 2,317,236 on 20 April 1943; after entering production in France, the device was called "Le Respirator". The co-founder of Scubapro Dick Bonin is credited with the introduction of the flexible-hose snorkel in the mid-1950s and the exhaust valve to ease snorkel clearing in 1980. In 1964, US Divers marketed an L-shaped snorkel intended to outperform J-shaped models by increasing breathing ease, cutting water drag and eliminating the "water trap". In the late 1960s, Dacor launched a "wraparound big-barrel" contoured snorkel, which closely follows the surface of the wearer's head and has a wider bore to improve airflow. The findings of the 1977 report "Allergic reactions to mask skirts, regulator mouthpieces and snorkel mouthpieces" encouraged diving equipment manufacturers to fit snorkels with hypoallergenic gum rubber and medical-grade silicone mouthpieces. For underwater swimming and diving, the side-mounted snorkel has long been the norm, although new-generation full-face swim masks with integrated snorkels are beginning to grow in popularity for use while floating and swimming at the surface.
1950
First use of the word "snorkel" to denote a breathing device for swimmers. The German word Schnorchel and its English derivatives "snorkle" and "snorkel" originally referred to an air intake used to supply air to the diesel engines of U-boats, invented during World War II to enable them to operate just below the surface at periscope depth and recharge batteries while keeping a low profile. First recorded in 1940–45. In April 1950, a West-Coast American newspaper showcased the work of The Spearfisherman diving equipment company, listing "snorkles (rubber breathing tubes)" among the manufacturer's underwater hunting products. In November of the same year, the Honolulu Sporting Goods Co. introduced a "swim-pipe" resembling Kramarenko and Wilen's side-mounted ball-float- and flutter-valve breathing tube design, urging children and adults to "try the human version of the submarine snorkel and be like a fish". Every advertisement in the first issue of Skin Diver magazine in December 1951 used the alternative spelling "snorkles" to denote swimmers' breathing tubes. In 1955, Albert VanderKogel classed stand-alone breathing tubes and swim masks with integrated breathing tubes as "pipe snorkels" and "mask snorkels" respectively. In 1957, the British Sub-Aqua Club journal features a lively debate about the standardisation of diving terms in general and the replacement of the existing British term "breathing tube" with the American term "snorkel" in particular. The following year saw the première of the 1958 British thriller film The Snorkel, whose title references a diving mask topped with two built-in breathing tubes. To date, every national and international standard on snorkels uses the term "snorkel" exclusively.
1969
First national standard on snorkels. In December 1969, the British Standards Institution published British Standard BS 4532 entitled "Specification for snorkels and face masks" and prepared by a committee on which the British Rubber Manufacturers' Association, the British Sub-Aqua Club, the Department for Education and Science, the Federation of British Manufacturers of Sports and Games, the Ministry of Defence Navy Department and the Royal Society for the Prevention of Accidents were represented. This British standard sets different maximum and minimum snorkel dimensions for adult and child users, specifies materials and design features for tubes and mouthpieces and requires a warning label and a set of instructions to be enclosed with each snorkel. In February 1980 and June 1991, the Deutsches Institut für Normung published the first and second editions of German Standard DIN 7878 on snorkel safety and testing. This German standard sets safety and testing criteria comparable to British standard BS 4532 with an additional requirement that every snorkel must be topped with a fluorescent red or orange band to alert other water users of the snorkeller's presence. In November 1988, Austrian Standards International published Austrian standard ÖNORM S 4223 entitled "Tauch-Zubehör; Schnorchel; Abmessungen, sicherheitstechnische Anforderungen, Prüfung, Normkennzeichnung" in German, subtitled "Diving accessories; snorkel; dimensions, safety requirements, testing, marking of conformity" in English and closely resembling German Standard DIN 7878 of February 1980 in specifications. The first and second editions of European Standard EN 1972 on snorkel requirements and test methods appeared in July 1997 and December 2015. This European standard refines snorkel dimension, airflow and joint-strength testing and matches snorkel measurements to the user's height and lung capacity. The snorkels regulated by these British, German, Austrian and European standards exclude combined masks and snorkels in which the snorkel tubes open into the mask. With respect to the latter, the British Standards Institution published British Standard BS 8647 entitled "Respiratory equipment – Full-face snorkel masks – Specification" in October 2024.

== Types and nomenclature ==
The basic snorkel types are those which are completely separate from the mask, which are variously called "separate", "simple", "plain", "tube", "pipe", or "independent" snorkels, or just "snorkels", and which are curved tubes with a bite-grip mouthpiece, and "integrated" snorkels, which are part of a "snorkel mask", which can be a half mask covering the eyes and nose, or more often, a full-face mask covering the eyes, nose and mouth.

== Function ==
A snorkel is used to allow the user to breathe atmospheric air when their face is immersed in water while swimming or floating at the surface. To work effectively, the snorkel must allow the user to inhale and exhale comfortably over an extended period, and provide a sufficient volume of air with appropriate oxygen and carbon dioxide content to maintain a sufficient and comfortable respiratory gas exchange in the lungs. Atmospheric air has a very consistent composition, so variations of inhaled air quality are almost entirely a consequence of how much exhaled air is inhaled on the next breath. The volume of air exchanged during a breathing cycle is called the tidal volume, and the volume of exhaled air that is inhaled on the next breath is called the dead space or dead volume.

Dead space reduces the amount of fresh air which reaches the alveoli during each breath. This reduces the oxygen available for gas exchange, and the amount of carbon dioxide that can be removed. The buildup of carbon dioxide is usually the more noticeable effect. The body can compensate to some extent by increasing the volume of inspired gas, but this also increases work of breathing, and is only effective when the ratio of dead space to tidal volume is reduced sufficiently to compensate for the additional carbon dioxide produced due to the increased work of breathing. Continued buildup of carbon dioxide will lead to hypercapnia and respiratory distress.

A longer tube would not allow breathing when snorkeling deeper, since it would place the lungs in deeper water where the surrounding water pressure is higher requiring significantly greater effort to inhale, and overtaxing the muscles that expand the lungs. The pressure difference across the tissues in the lungs, between the blood capillaries and air spaces during negative pressure breathing would increase the risk of pulmonary edema.

== Operation ==
The simplest type of snorkel is a plain tube that is held in the mouth, and allowed to flood when underwater. The snorkeler expels water from the snorkel either with a sharp exhalation on return to the surface (blast clearing) or by tilting the head back shortly before reaching the surface and exhaling until reaching or breaking the surface (displacement clearing) and facing forward or down again before inhaling the next breath. The displacement method expels water by filling the snorkel with air; it is a technique that takes practice but clears the snorkel with less effort, but only works when surfacing. Clearing splash water while at the surface requires blast clearing.

Experienced users tend to develop a breathing style which minimises work of breathing, carbon dioxide buildup and risk of water inspiration, while optimising water removal. This involves a sharp puff in the early stage of exhalation, which is effective for clearing the tube of remaining water, and a fairly large but comfortable exhaled volume, mostly fairly slowly for low work of breathing, followed by an immediate slow inhalation, which reduces entrainment of any residual water, to a comfortable but relatively large inhaled volume, repeated without delay. Elastic recoil of the lungs is used to assist with the initial puff, which can be made sharper by controlling the start of exhalation with the tongue. This technique is most applicable to relaxed cruising on the surface. Racing finswimmers may use a different technique as they need a far greater level of ventilation when working hard.

Single snorkels and two-way twin snorkels constitute respiratory dead space. Including the internal volume of the mask in the breathing circuit greatly increases the dead space. When the user inhales, some of the previously exhaled air which remains in the dead space is inhaled again, reducing the amount of fresh air in the inhaled volume, which increases the risk of hypercapnia, a buildup of carbon dioxide in the blood. The greater the volume of the dead space, and the smaller the tidal volume of breathing, the more this problem is exacerbated. A smaller diameter tube reduces the dead space, but also increases resistance to airflow and so increases the work of breathing. Occasional exhalation through the nose while snorkeling with a separate snorkel will slightly reduce the buildup of carbon dioxide, and may help in keeping the mask clear of water, but in cold water it will increase fogging of the inside of the mask. Twin integrated snorkels with one-way valves eliminate the dead-space of the snorkels themselves, but are usually used on a full-face mask, and even if it has an inner orinasal section, there will be some dead space, and the valves will impede airflow through the loop to some extent. Integrated two-way snorkels include the internal volume of the mask as dead space in addition to the volume of the snorkels unless there is a one way flow enforced by non-return valves and internal ducting. To some extent the effect of dead space can be counteracted by breathing more deeply, as this reduces the dead space ratio. Slower breathing will reduce the effort needed to move the air through the circuit. There is a danger that a snorkeler who can breathe comfortably in good conditions will be unable to ventilate adequately under stress or when working harder, leading to hypercapnia and possible panic, and could get into serious difficulties if they are unable to swim effectively if they have to remove the snorkel or mask to breathe without restriction.

Some snorkels have a sump at the lowest point to prevent a small volume of water remaining in the snorkel from being inhaled when the snorkeler breathes. Most of these also have a non-return drain valve in the sump, to drain water from the tube when the diver exhales. The water is pushed out through the valve when the tube is blocked by water and the exhalation pressure exceeds the water pressure on the outside of the valve. This is similar to the mechanism of blast clearing which does not require the valve, but the pressure required is slightly less, and effective blast clearing may require a higher flow rate. When the water level in the snorkel drops sufficiently for exhaled air to bypass over the water, much of the effectiveness of the drain valve is lost, and the remaining water may not all be ejected. The full-face snorkel mask may have a double airflow passage with non-return valves to reduce dead space in the tubes, one tube providing inflow and the other for outflow, but the interior of the mask remains a large dead space unless an orinasal pocket is included. The full-face mask encloses the nose and mouth in the same volume which is connected to the snorkel tube or tubes, which allows breathing through the nose in addition to the mouth. A few "dry" models of separate snorkel have float-operated valves attached to the top end of the tube to keep water out when a wave passes, but these cause problems when diving as the snorkel must then be equalized during descent, using part of the diver's inhaled air supply. Some recent "semi-dry" designs come with a splash deflector on the top end to reduce entry of water that splashes over the top of the tube, thereby keeping it relatively free from water at the surface.

A common problem with all mechanical clearing mechanisms is their tendency to fail if infrequently used, or if stored for long periods, or through environmental fouling, or owing to lack of maintenance. Many also either slightly increase the flow resistance of the snorkel, or provide a small water trap, which retains a little water in the tube after clearing, or both.

Modern snorkels use silicone rubber in the mouthpiece and valves due to its resistance to degradation and its long service life. Natural rubber was formerly used, but slowly oxidizes and breaks down due to ultraviolet light exposure from the sun. It eventually loses its flexibility, becomes brittle and cracks, which can cause clearing valves to stick in the open or closed position, and float valves to leak due to a failure of the valve seat to seal. Natural rubber can also cause an allergic reaction in some people. In older designs, some snorkels were made with small "ping pong" balls in a cage mounted to the upper open end of the tube to prevent water ingress. These are no longer sold or recommended because they are unreliable and considered hazardous, and are illegal to manufacture or sell in some countries.

Diving masks with a built-in snorkel are not used for scuba diving. The snorkel is useless during the dive and increases the risk of dislodging and flooding the mask.

== Applications ==
=== Surface snorkelling ===
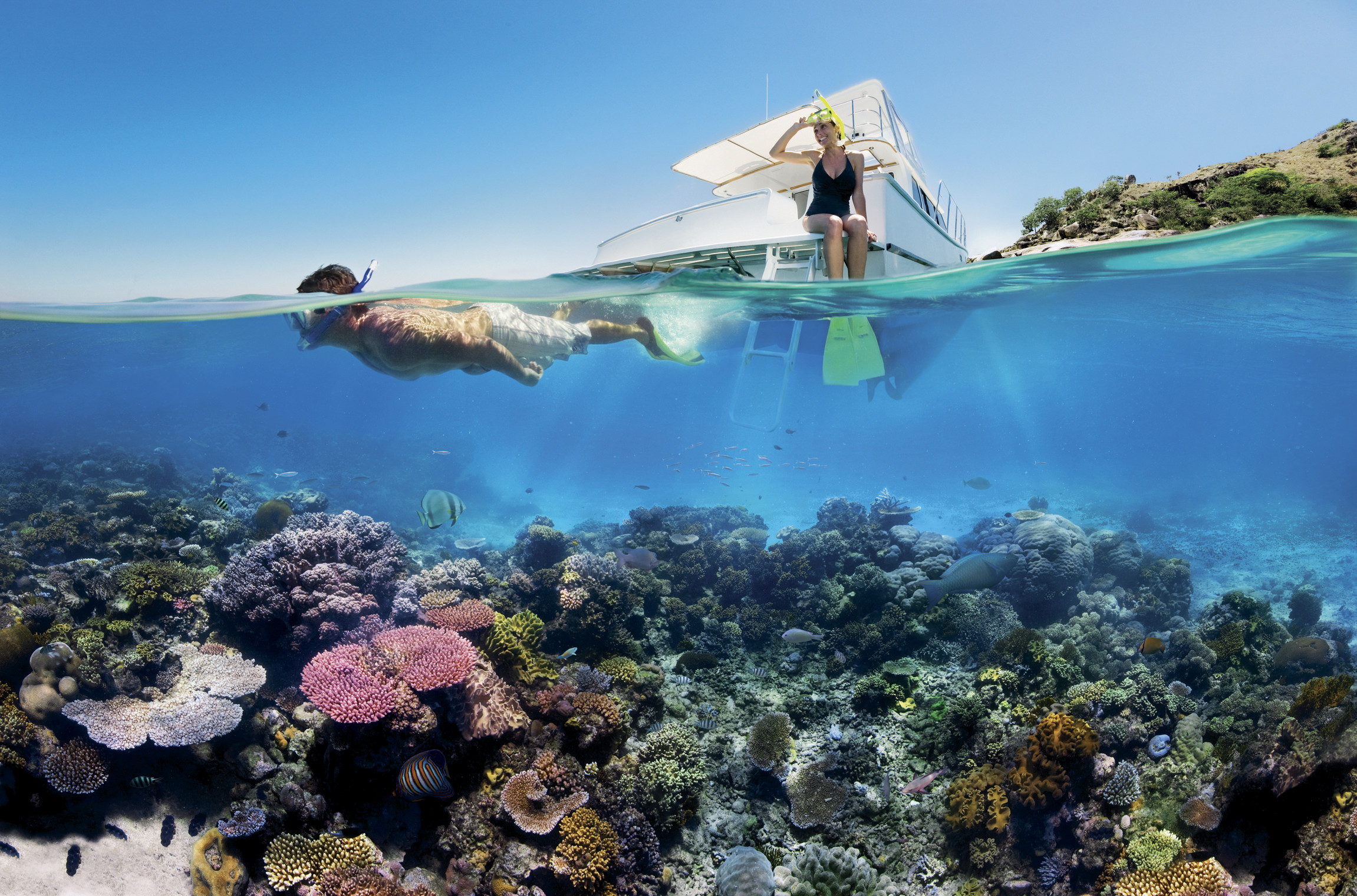
Reef Snorkelling on the Great Barrier Reef

Snorkelling is the practice of swimming face down on or through a body of water while breathing the ambient air through a snorkel, usually with swimming goggles or a diving mask, and swimfins. In cooler waters, a wetsuit may also be worn. The snorkel may be an independent item or integrated with the mask. The use of this equipment allows the snorkeler to observe the underwater environment for extended periods with relatively little effort, and to breathe while face-down at the surface.

Snorkeling is a popular recreational activity, particularly at tropical resort locations. It provides the opportunity to observe underwater life in a natural setting without the complicated equipment and training required for scuba diving. It appeals to all ages because of how little effort is involved.

=== Finswimming ===
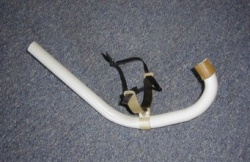
Front-mounted competitive swimmer's snorkel

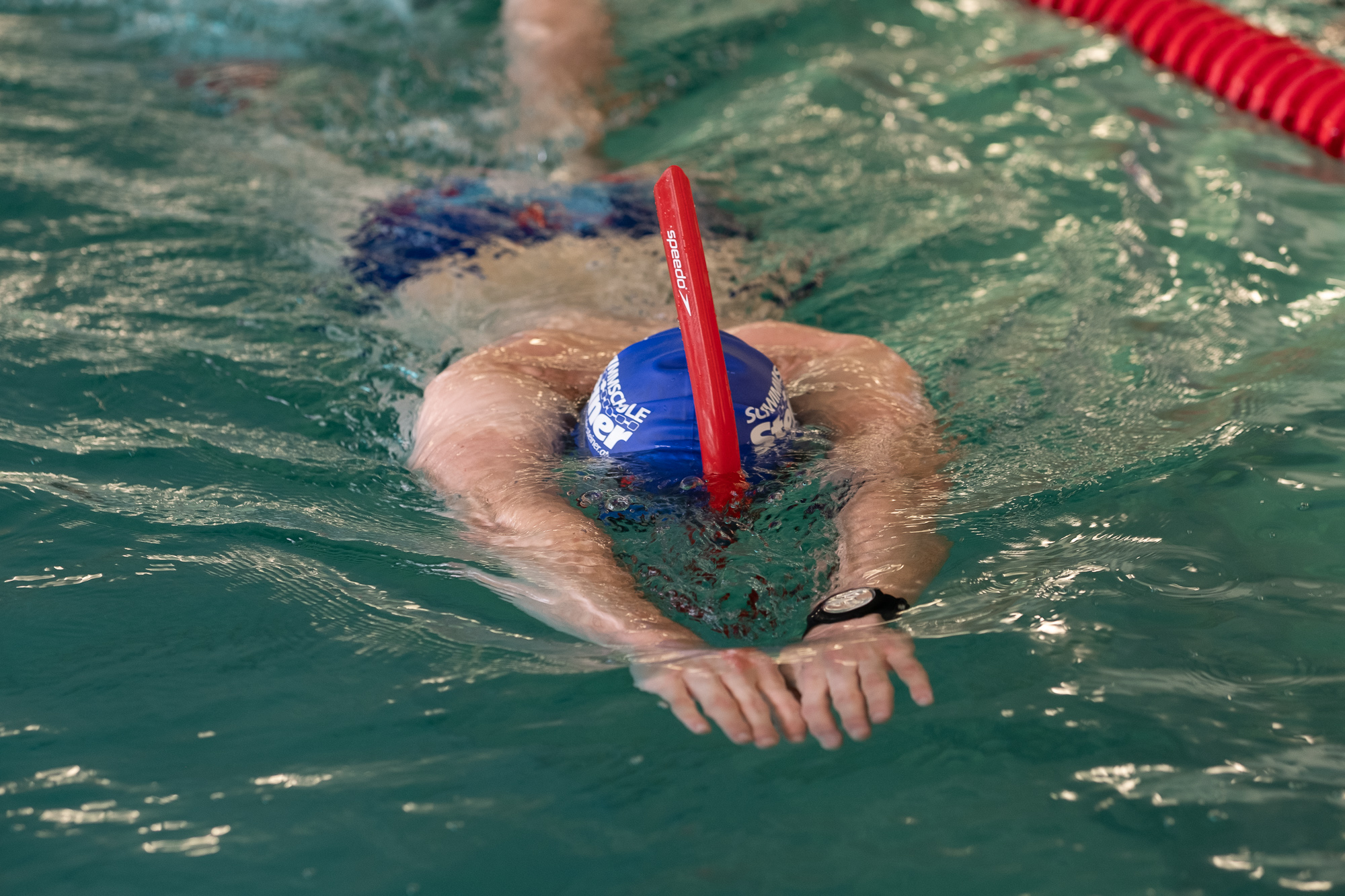
Finswimmer using front-mounted snorkel

Finswimming is competitive swimming using fins. The surface disciplines also use a snorkel. Finswimmers generally use a front-mounted snorkel for lower drag and stability at speed. The rigid forehead bracket and central position minimise off-centre loads and keep the snorkel stable at relatively high speeds. They do not normally use snorkels with a sump valve, as they learn to blast clear the tube on most if not all exhalations, which keeps the water content in the tube to a minimum, and the tube can be shaped for lower work of breathing, and elimination of water traps, allowing greater speed and lowering the stress of eventual swallowing of small quantities of water, which would impede their competition performance.

=== Freediving ===
Freediving is a form of underwater diving that relies on breath-holding until resurfacing rather than the use of breathing apparatus. A snorkel is not generally used for competitive freediving, as the additional work of breathing and dead space reduce performance, but they are normally used for non-competitive snorkel-diving, spearfishing and breathhold underwater sports like underwater hockey where the ability to breathe while viewing the underwater scene from the surface is a big advantage for planning the next descent.

=== Scuba diving ===
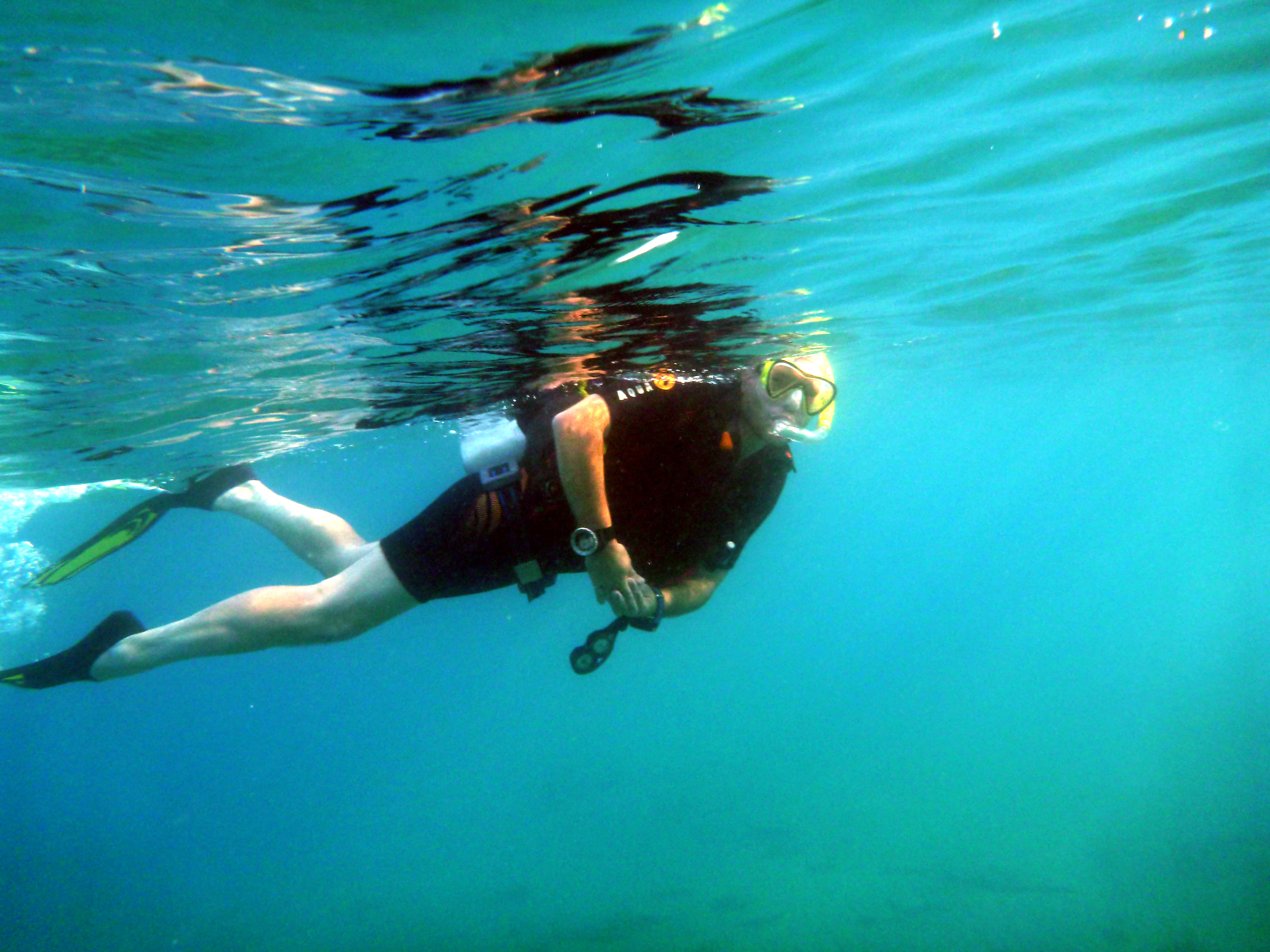
Scuba diver snorkeling

A snorkel can be useful when scuba diving as it is a convenient way to conserve the compressed breathing gas supply while swimming face down at the surface for extended periods, or for use in a contingency situation at the surface when there is a problem with either gas supply or diving regulator. Many dives do not require the use of a snorkel at all, and some scuba divers do not consider a snorkel a necessary or even useful piece of equipment, and it can be a snagging hazard in some environments, so the usefulness of a snorkel depends on the dive plan and the dive site. If there is no requirement to swim face down at the surface and see what is happening underwater, then a snorkel is not useful. If it is necessary to swim over heavy seaweed which can entangle the pillar valve and regulator if the diver swims face upward, to get to and from the dive site, then a snorkel is useful to conserve breathing gas. A scuba diver may carry a collapsible snorkel in a pocket to keep it safely out of the way when not in use during a dive.

== Separate snorkels ==
A snorkel may be either separate from, or integrated into, a swim or dive mask. A separate snorkel, or tube snorkel, typically comprises a tube for breathing and a means of attaching the tube to the head of the wearer. The tube has an opening at the top and a mouthpiece at the bottom. Some tubes are topped with a valve to prevent water from entering the tube when it is submerged.

Although snorkels come in many forms, they are primarily classified by their dimensions and secondarily by their orientation and shape. The length and the inner diameter (or inner volume) of the tube are important ergonomic considerations when matching a snorkel to the requirements of its user. The orientation and shape of the tube must also be taken into account when matching a snorkel to its use while seeking to optimise ergonomic factors such as streamlining, airflow, water retention, interrupting the field of vision, and work of breathing.

=== Dimensions ===
The total length, inner diameter and internal volume of a snorkel tube are important because they affect the user's ability to breathe normally and ventilate adequately through the tube. Internal volume represents the dead space of the snorkel, and inside diameter and length are used as proxies for the internal volume. These dimensions also have implications for the user's ability to blow residual water out of the tube when surfacing. A long or narrow snorkel tube, or a tube with abrupt changes in direction, or internal surface irregularities will have greater breathing resistance due to friction, while a wide tube will have a larger dead space for the same length and may be hard to clear of water. A short tube or a tube aligned at the wrong angle, will be more susceptible to swamping by waves.

To date, all national and international standards on snorkels specify two ranges of tube dimensions to meet the health and safety needs of their end-users, whether young or old, short or tall, with low or high lung capacity. These dimensions are the total length, the inner diameter and/or the inner volume of the tube. The specifications of the standardisation bodies are tabulated below.

Snorkel standards and rules	Total length	Inner diameter	Total inner volume
British Standard: BS 4532 (1969)	500 mm – 600 mm	15 mm – 18 mm	
British Standard: BS 4532 (1977)	300 mm – 600 mm	15 mm – 22.5 mm. An inner diameter exceeding 20 mm is child-inappropriate.	
German Standard: DIN 7878 (1980)	Form A (Children): 300 mm max. Form B (Adults): 350 mm max.	Form A (Children): 15 mm – 18 mm. Form B (Adults): 18 mm – 25 mm.	Form A (Children): 120 cc max. Form B (Adults): 150 cc max.
Austrian Standard: ÖNORM S 4223 (1988)	Form A (Children): 300 mm max. Form B (Adults): 350 mm max.	Form A (Children): 15 mm – 18 mm. Form B (Adults): 18 mm – 25 mm.	Form A (Children): 120 cc max. Form B (Adults): 150 cc max.
German Standard: DIN 7878 (1991)	Form A (Users over ten years of age): 350 mm max. Form C (Ten-year-olds and younger): 300 mm max.	Form A (Users over ten years of age): 18 mm min. Form C (Ten-year-olds and younger): 18 mm min.	Form A (Users over ten years of age): 180 cc max. Form C (Ten-year-olds and younger): 120 cc max.
European Standard: EN 1972 (1997)	Type 1 (Users 150 cm or less in height): 350 mm max. Type 2 (Users exceeding 150 cm in height): 380 mm max. Competitive finswimming: 480 mm max.		Type 1 (Users 150 cm or less in height): 150 cc max. Type 2 (Users exceeding 150 cm in height): 230 cc max. Competitive finswimming: 230 cc max.
European Standard: EN 1972 (2015)	Class A (Users with larger lung capacity): 380 mm max. Class B (Users with smaller lung capacity, e.g. children): 350 mm max.		Class A (Users with larger lung capacity): 230 cc max. Class B (Users with smaller lung capacity, e.g. children): 150 cc max.
World Underwater Federation (CMAS) Surface Finswimming Rules (2017)	430 mm – 480 mm.	15 mm – 23 mm. Tube cross-section to be circular.	

The table above shows how snorkel dimension limits have changed over time in response to better understanding of the effects of dead space and breathing resistance on carbon dioxide retention.

- Maximum tube length has almost halved (from 600 to 380 mm).
- Maximum bore (inner diameter) has increased (from 18 to 25 mm).
- Capacity (or inner volume) has partly replaced inner diameter when dimensioning snorkels.
- Different snorkel dimension limits have evolved for different users (first specified as adults/children; then taller/shorter heights; then larger/smaller lung capacities, all of them used as proxies for expected tidal volume, as the ratio of tidal volume to dead space controls the amount of carbon dioxide in the inhaled air of each breath).

=== Orientation and shape ===
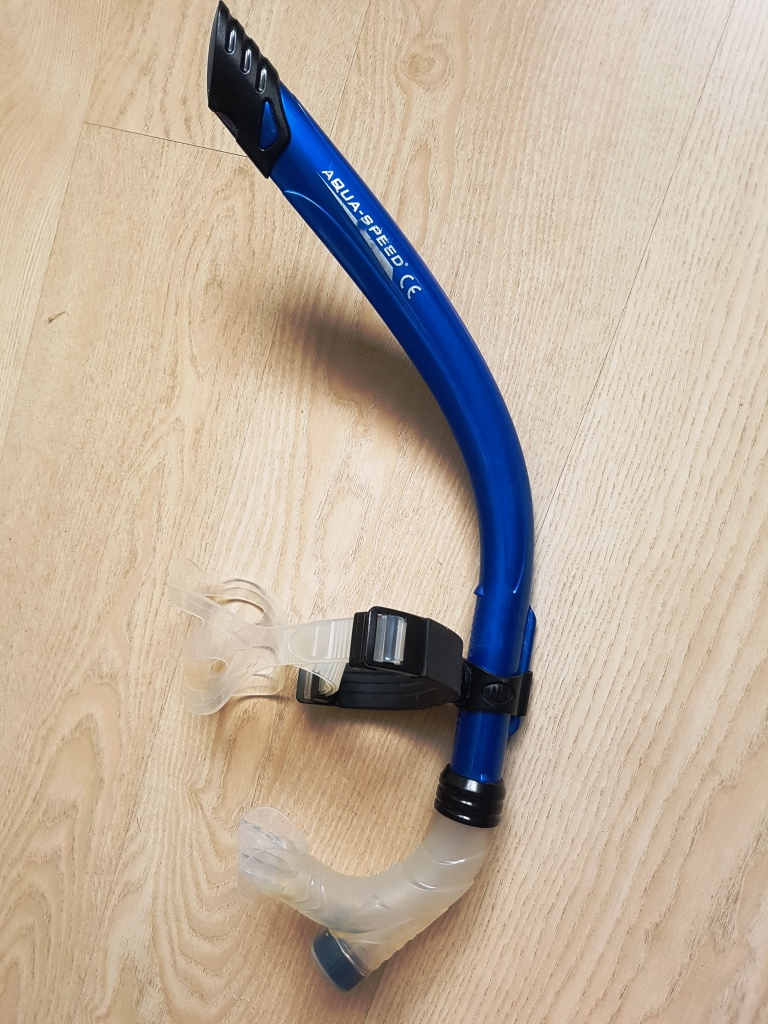
Front mounted snorkel

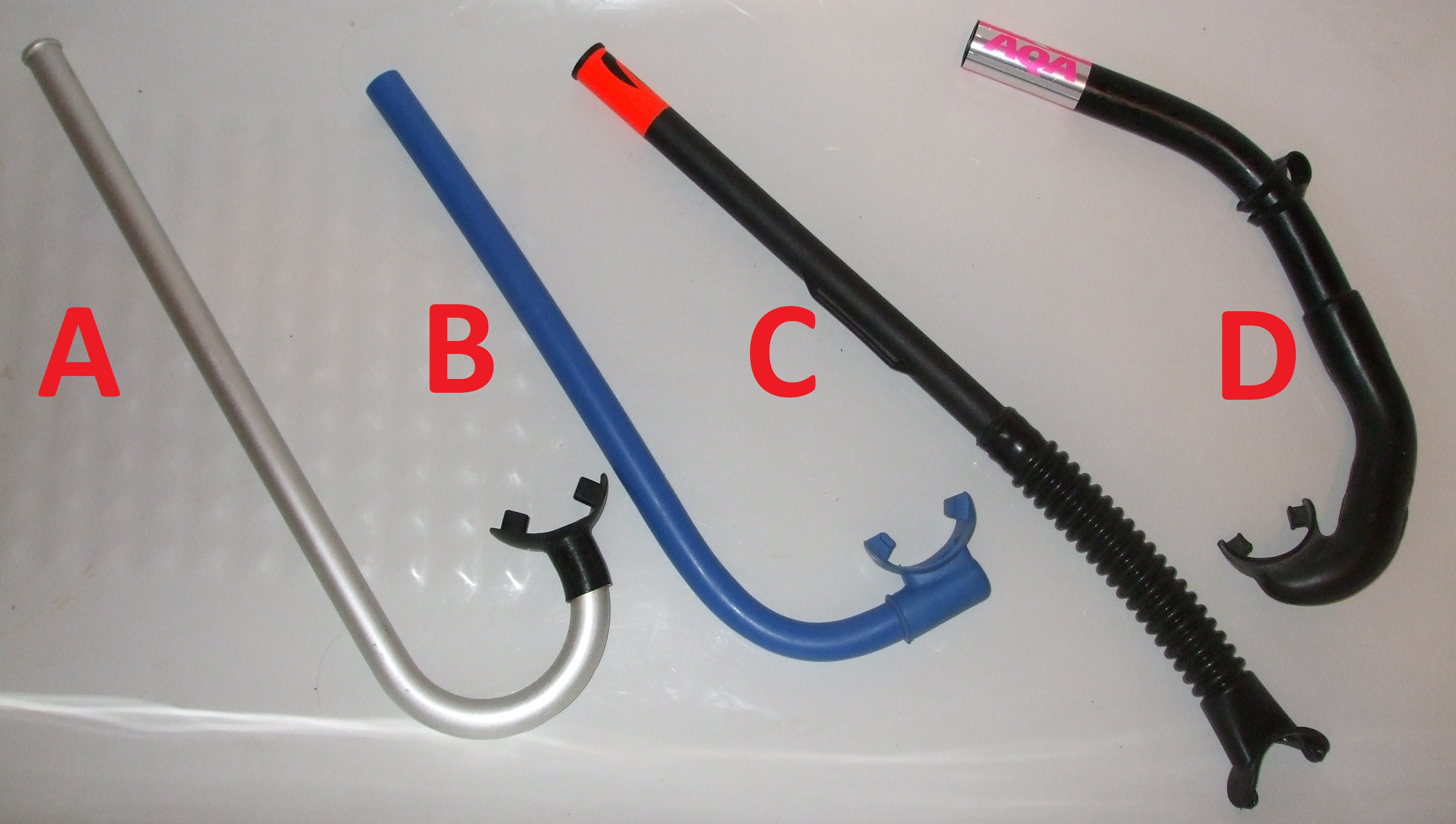
Basic side mounted snorkel shapes

Snorkels are made for two orientations: Front-mounted and side-mounted. The first snorkel to be patented in 1938 was front-mounted, worn with the tube over the front of the face and secured with a bracket to the diving mask. Front-mounted snorkels were popular in European snorkeling until the late 1950s, when they were largely superseded by side-mounted snorkels for general use. Front-mounted snorkels experienced a comeback a decade later as competitive swimming equipment to be used in pool workouts and in finswimming races, where they outperform side-mounted snorkels in streamlining and load balance. Front-mounted snorkels are attached to the head with a forehead bracket fitted with adjustable straps to be buckled around the head.

Side-mounted snorkels are generally worn by scuba divers on the left-hand side of the head because the scuba regulator hose is routed over the right shoulder. They come in at least four basic shapes: J-shaped; L-shaped; flexible-hose; contour.

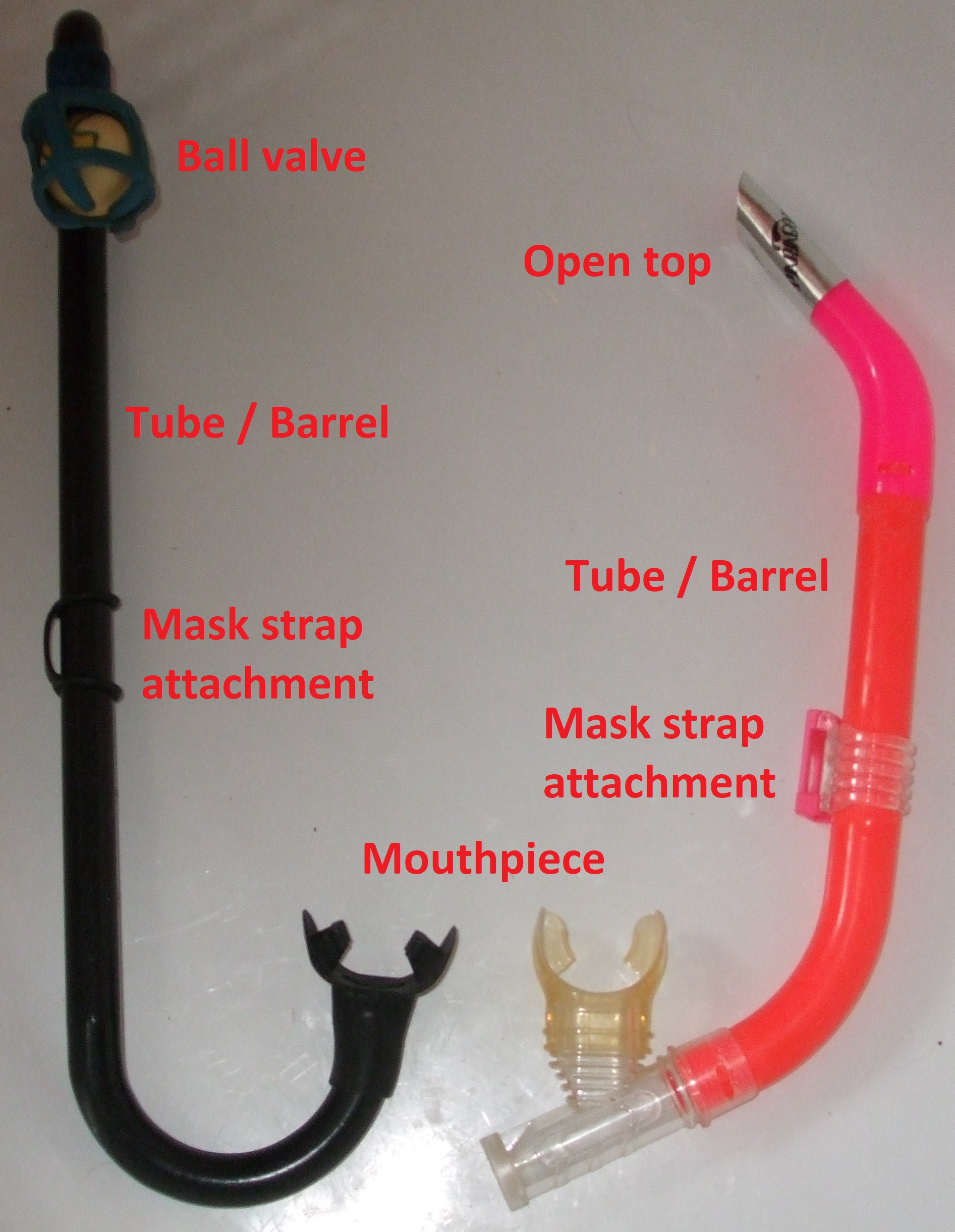
Snorkel parts

- A. J-shaped snorkels represent the original side-mounted snorkel design, cherished by some for their simplicity but eschewed by others because water accumulates in the U-bend at the bottom. They project further away from the face, which causes more drag load on the jaw to hold them in place.
- B. L-shaped snorkels represent an improvement on the J-shaped style. They are claimed to reduce breathing resistance, to cut water drag and to remove the "water trap".
- C. Flexible-hose snorkels are preferred by some scuba divers because the flexible hose between the tube and the mouthpiece causes the lower part of the snorkel to drop out of the way of the demand valve when it is not in use. However, a freediver equipped with this snorkel design must have a hand free to replace the mouthpiece when it falls out of the mouth.
- D. Contour snorkels represent the most recent design development. They have a "wraparound" shape with smooth curves closely following the outline of the wearer's head, which improves wearing comfort, because the lower hydrodynamic drag reduces the support loads.

=== Independent snorkel construction ===
An independent snorkel consists essentially of a curved tube with a mouthpiece to be inserted between the lips and gripped by the teeth.

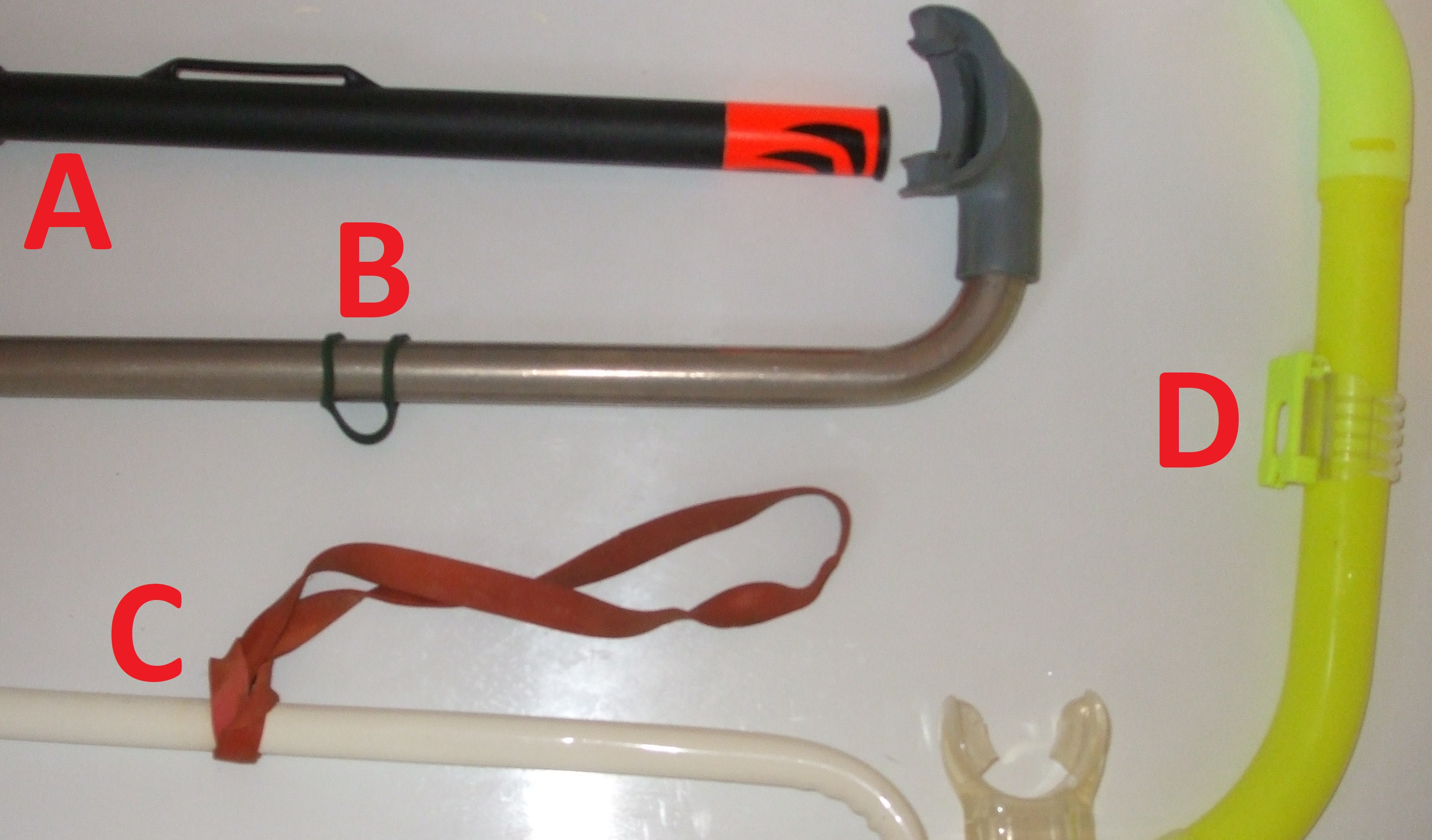
Snorkel attachment methods

The barrel is the hollow tube leading from the supply end at the top of the snorkel to the demand end at the bottom where the mouthpiece is attached. The barrel is made of a relatively rigid material such as plastic, light metal or hard rubber. The bore is the interior chamber of the barrel; bore length, diameter and curvature all affect breathing resistance.

The top of the barrel may be open to the elements or fitted with a valve designed to shut off the air supply from the atmosphere when the top is submerged. There may be a red or orange band around the top to alert other water users of the snorkeller's presence. The simplest way of attaching the snorkel to the head is to slip the top of the barrel between the mask strap and the head. This may cause the mask to leak if done carelessly, and alternative means of attachment of the barrel to the head can be seen in the illustration of connection methods.

- A. The mask strap is threaded through the loop moulded on to the barrel.
- B. The mask strap is threaded through the separable rubber loop or plastic clip slid over the barrel and held in place by friction.
- C. The rubber band knotted to this 1950s American snorkel barrel is stretched over the head above the mask.
- D. The mask strap is threaded through the rotatable plastic snorkel keeper positioned about halfway up the barrel.

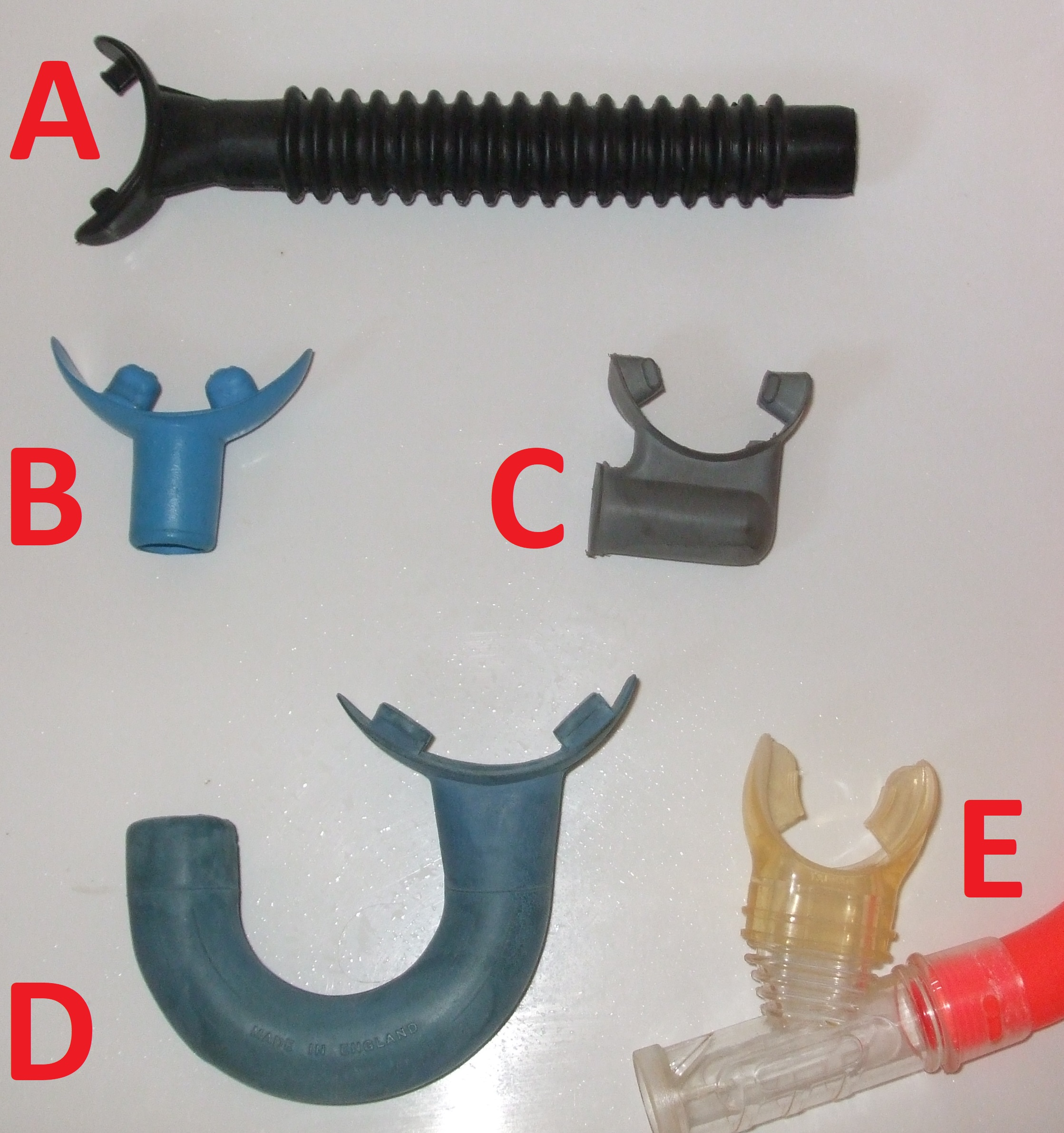
Snorkel mouthpieces

Attached to the demand end of the snorkel at the bottom of the barrel, the mouthpiece serves to keep the snorkel in the mouth. It is made of soft and flexible material, typically natural rubber and latterly silicone or PVC. The commonest of the multiple designs available features a curved flange with two lugs to be gripped between the teeth:

- A. Flanged mouthpiece with twin lugs at end of length of flexible corrugated hose designed for flexible-hose snorkel.
- B. Flanged mouthpiece with twin lugs at the end of short neck designed for J-shaped snorkel.
- C. Flanged mouthpiece with twin lugs positioned at a right angle and designed for an L-shaped snorkel.
- D. Flanged mouthpiece with twin lugs at the end of a flexible U-shaped elbow designed to be combined with a straight barrel to create a J-shaped snorkel.
- E. Flanged mouthpiece with twin bite lugs offset at an angle with a drain valve at the low point.

A disadvantage of mouthpieces with lugs is the presence of the teeth when breathing. The tighter the teeth grip the mouthpiece lugs, the smaller the air gap between the teeth and the harder it will be to breathe. The lugs are meant to hold the teeth apart allowing the passage of air through the gap.

Among recent innovations is the "collapsible snorkel", which can be folded up in a pocket for emergencies for scuba divers who may not need a snorkel on every dive. One for competitive swimmers is a lightweight training snorkel with twin inlet tubes, which exhausts through a valve underwater, similar to the exhaust valve of a diving demand valve, so the dead space is restricted to the mouthpiece volume; another is a "restrictor cap" placed inside a snorkel barrel "restricting breathing by 40% to increase cardiovascular strength and build lung capacity". Some additional snorkel features such as shut-off and drain valves fell out of favour decades ago, only to return in the contemporary era as more reliable devices for incorporation into "dry" and "semi-dry" snorkels.

== Integrated snorkels ==
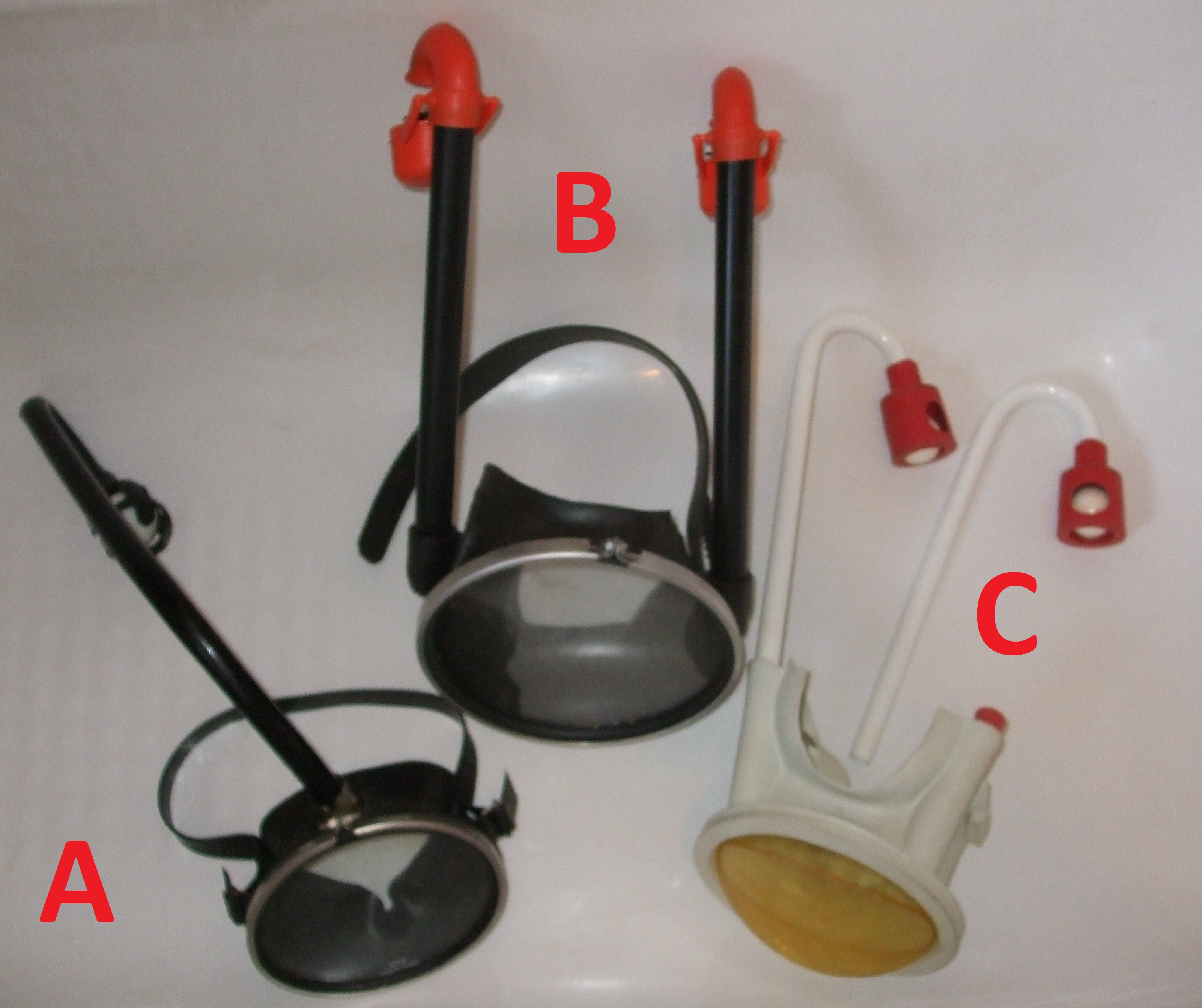
Older swim masks with integrated snorkels

Integrated snorkels are single or multiple tubular devices integrated with, and opening into, a swim or dive mask, and a snorkel-mask is a swim or dive mask with single or multiple integrated snorkels. The integrated snorkel mask may be a half-mask, which encloses the eyes and nose but excludes the mouth, or a full-face snorkel mask, which covers the eyes, nose, and mouth. Early designs of snorkel-mask typically comprised a tube for breathing with an immersion-activated shut-off valve at the top, and the bottom opening into the mask, which might cover the mouth as well as the nose and eyes. Such snorkels tended to be permanent fixtures, but a minority could be detached from their sockets and replaced with plugs allowing the masks to be used without their snorkels.

The 1950s were the heyday of older-generation snorkel-masks, first for the pioneers of underwater hunting and then for the general public who swam in their wake. One authority of the time declared that "the advantage of this kind of mask is mainly from the comfort point of view. It fits snugly to one's face, there is no mouthpiece to bite on, and one can breathe through either nose or mouth". Another concluded that "built-in snorkel masks are the best" and "a must for those who have sinus trouble." Yet others, including a co-founder of the British Sub-Aqua Club, deemed masks with integrated snorkels to be complicated and unreliable: "Many have the breathing tube built in as an integral part of the mask. I have never seen the advantage of this, and this is the opinion shared by most experienced underwater swimmers I know". These designs tend to have a large dead space in the mask in addition to the dead space of the snorkels. Six decades on, a new generation of snorkel-masks has come to the marketplace.

Like separate snorkels, integrated snorkels come in a variety of forms. The assortment of older-generation masks with integrated snorkels highlights certain similarities and differences:

- A. A model enclosing the eyes and the nose only. A permanent single snorkel emerges from the top of the mask and terminates above with a ball float shut-off valve.
- B. A model with a chinpiece to enclose the eyes, the nose and the mouth. Permanent twin snorkels emerge from either side of the mask and terminate above with "gamma" shut-off valves.
- C. A model enclosing the eyes and nose only. Removable twin snorkels emerge from either side of the mask and terminate above with ball float shut-off valves. Supplied with plugs for use without snorkels, as illustrated.

Integrated snorkels are tentatively classified here by their tube configuration and by the face coverage of the masks to which they are attached.

Early manufacturers and retailers generally classed integrated snorkel masks by the number of breathing tubes projecting from their tops and sides. Their terse product descriptions often read: "single snorkel mask", "twin snorkel mask", "double snorkel mask" or "dual snorkel mask".

=== Integrated snorkel construction ===
An integrated snorkel consists essentially of a tube topped with a shut-off valve to block water ingress during immersion, and opening at the bottom into the interior of a modified diving mask via sockets moulded into the rubber of the skirt or the plastic of the frame.

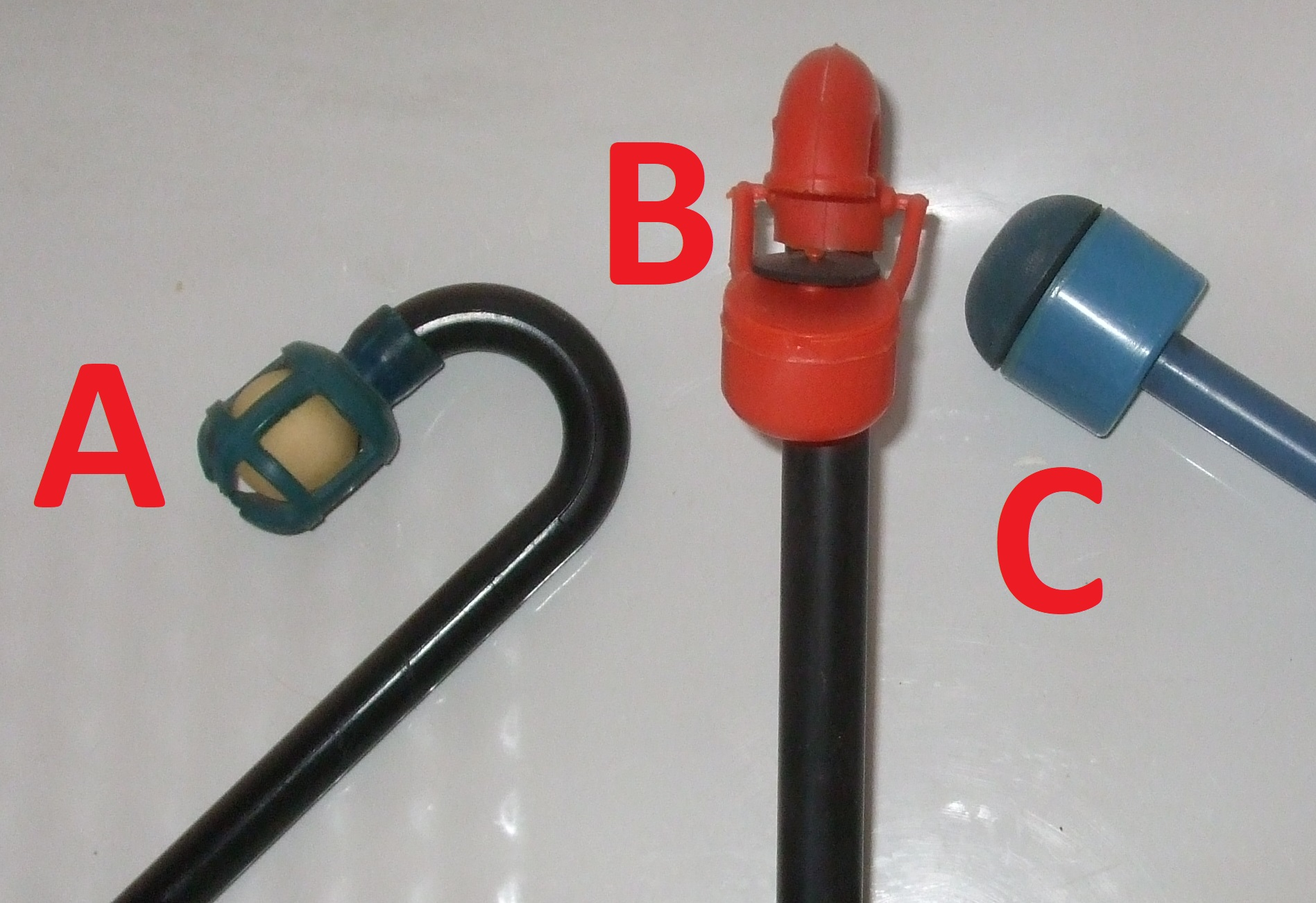
Shut-off valves fitted to older snorkels

Integrated snorkel tubes are made of strong but lightweight rigid materials, usually a tough plastic. At the top end, they are fitted with valves made of plastic, rubber, or more recently, silicone. Three typical first generation shut-off valves are illustrated.

- A. Ball valve using a ping-pong ball in a cage to prevent water ingress when submerged. This device may be the most common and familiar valve used on first-generation snorkels, whether separate or integrated.
- B. Hinged "gamma" valve to prevent water ingress when submerged. This device was invented in 1954 by Luigi Ferraro, fitted as standard on every Cressi-sub mask with integrated breathing tubes and granted US patent 2,815,751 on 10 December 1957.
- C. Sliding float valve to prevent water ingress when submerged. This device was used on Britmarine brand snorkels manufactured by the Haffenden company in Sandwich, Kent during the 1960s.

Integrated snorkels must be fitted with valves to shut off the snorkel's air inlet when submerged or water will pour into the opening at the top and flood the interior of the mask. Snorkels are attached to sockets on the top or the sides of the mask.

The skirt of the diving mask attached to the snorkel is made of rubber, a synthetic elastomer, or latterly a silicone elastomer. First-generation snorkel masks have a single oval, round or rounded triangular lens retained in a groove in the skirt of the mask by a metal clamp. An adjustable head strap or harness ensures a snug fit on the wearer's face. The body of a mask with full-face coverage is fitted with a chinpiece to enable a complete leak-tight enclosure of the face, and to prevent the buoyancy of the mask from lifting it up the face and exposing the mouth.

Some designs had unusual features. One design separated the eyes and the nose into separate mask compartments to reduce fogging and dead space. Others enabled the user to remove integrated snorkels and insert plugs instead, converting the snorkel-mask into an ordinary diving mask. Second generation snorkel-masks may enclose the nose and the mouth within an inner orinasal pocket which may be directly connected to the single snorkel with its float valve at the upper end.

=== Half-face snorkel masks ===
Half-face snorkel-masks, or integrated snorkel half-masks, are based on standard diving half-masks with built-in breathing tubes topped with float valves. They cover the eyes and the nose only, excluding the mouth altogether. The integral snorkels enable swimmers to keep their mouths closed, inhaling and exhaling air through their noses instead, while they are at, or just below, the surface of the water. When the snorkel tops submerge, their float activated valves are supposed to shut off automatically, blocking nasal respiration and preventing mask flooding.

Apart from the integral tubes and their sockets, older snorkel-half-masks generally used the same lenses, skirts and straps used for standard diving masks without snorkels. Several models of this kind could be converted to standard masks by replacing their detachable tubes with air- and water-tight plugs. Conversely, the 1950s Typhoon Super Star and the modern-retro Fish Brand M4D diving half-masks came with sealed but snorkel-ready sockets at the top of the skirt moulding. The 1950s US Divers "Marino" hybrid comprised a single snorkel mask with eye and nose coverage only and a separate snorkel for the mouth. There are numerous mid-twentieth-century examples of commercially available snorkel-masks covering the eyes and the nose only, requiring the user to breathe through the nose while face down on the surface, but allowing immediate mouth breathing in an emergency if the head is lifted so that the mouth clears the water. New-generation versions remain relatively rare commodities in the early twenty-first century.

=== Full-face snorkel masks ===
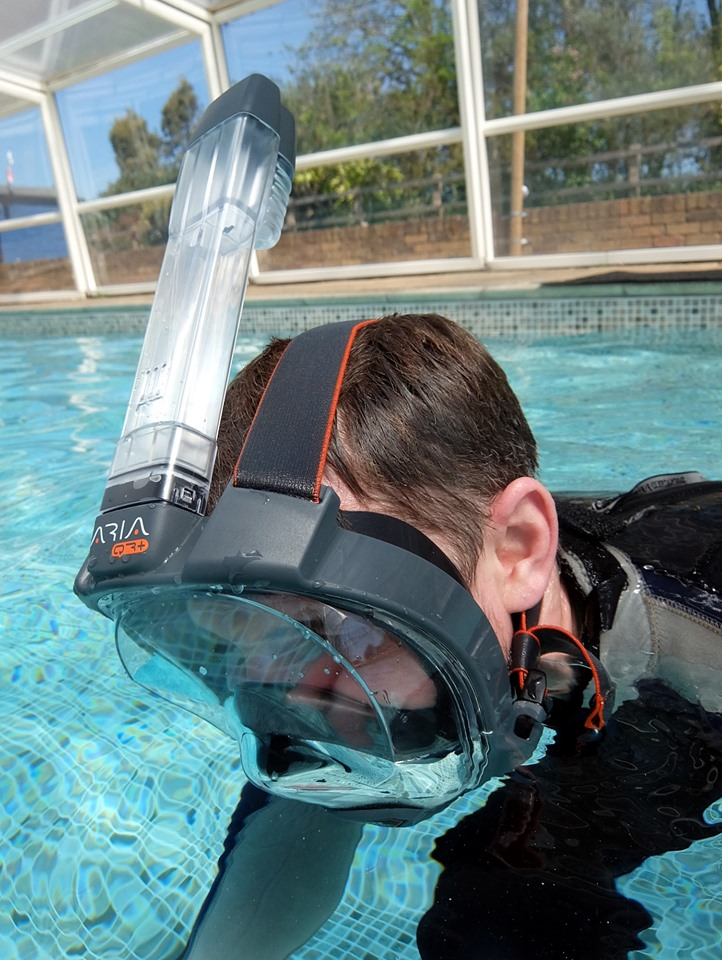
Ocean Reef snorkel mask

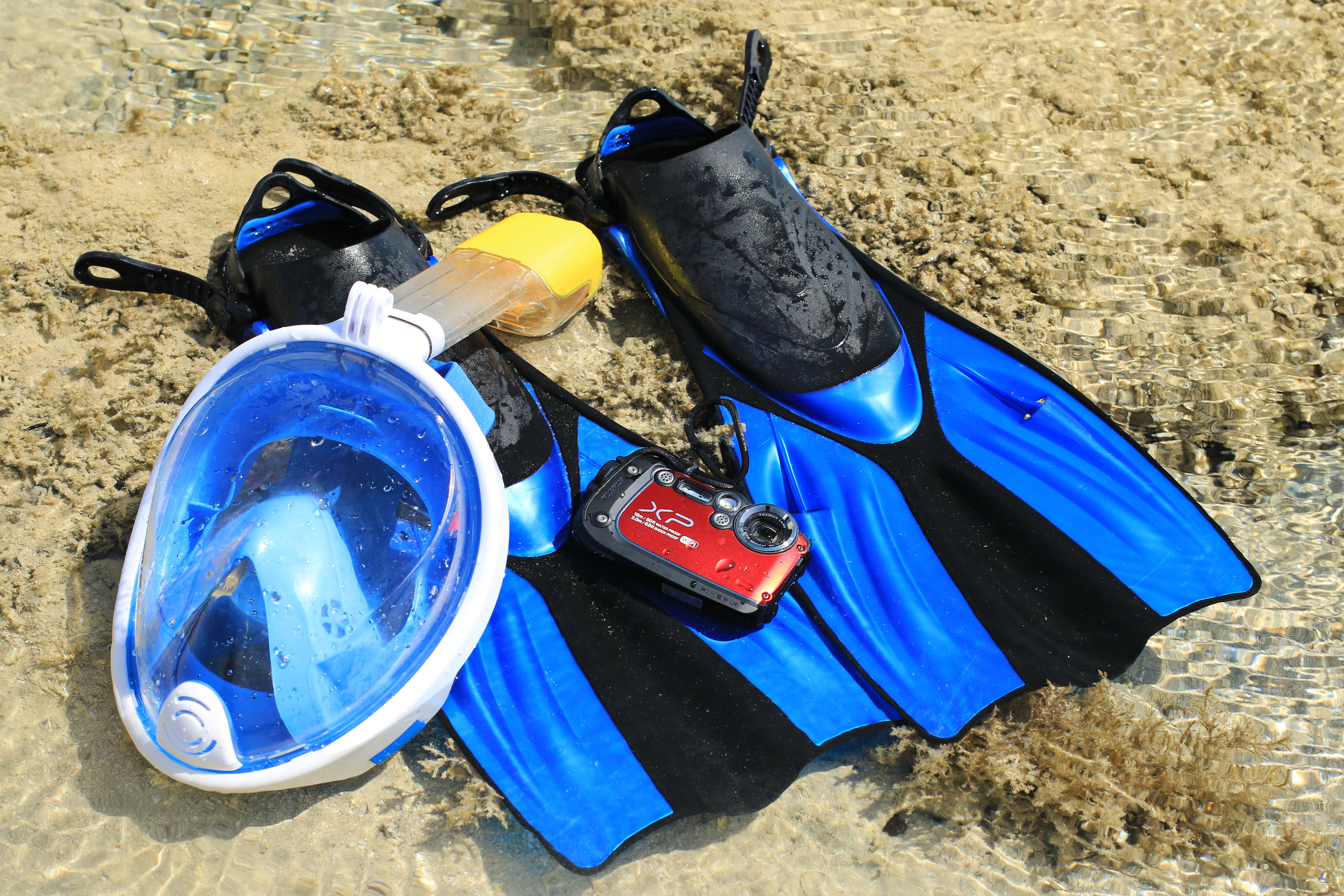
Snorkelling equipment: FFSM, fins and underwater camera

Full-face snorkel masks (FFSMs) allow users to breathe nasally or orally and can avoid gag reflex in response to standard snorkel mouthpieces. The breathing air path through a full-face snorkel mask can vary depending on basic layout and internal details.

Some first-generation snorkel masks were full-face masks covering the eyes, nose and mouth, while others excluded the mouth, covering the eyes and the nose only. They did not use an orinasal pocket, and had a two-directional airflow, with a large dead space, and mixing of fresh and exhaled air in the mask volume. Most second-generation snorkel-masks are full-face masks covering the eyes, nose and mouth. The integral snorkel of a second generation full-face snorkel mask may have separate channels for inhaled and exhaled air to minimise mechanical dead space, which is the volume of exhaled air inhaled on the next breath. It is not practicable to eliminate all mechanical dead space.

In all cases fresh air enters through the snorkel tube at the top of the mask when the user inhales. This passes into the upper part of the mask and over the inner face of the viewport. If there is an inner divider isolating an orinasal pocket, air from the upper section will pass into it via holes provided for that purpose. These holes may be fitted with non-return valves. The air then enters the user's nose or mouth into the anatomical air passages, and some reaches the alveoli of the lungs, where gas exchange with the blood occurs. On exhalation, air passes back into the orinasal pocket, and if there are non-return valves on the inlet ports, and the orinasal pocket seals correctly against the user's face, it is constrained to pass through the exhaust ducting, either to an alternative exhaust tube in the snorkel, or to exhaust ports in the body of the mask, and out into the surroundings, either above or into the water. If there are functioning non-return valves in the exhaust ducting at any point, and no leaks to other air spaces, the exhaled air will not return to the orinasal pocket by this route on inhalation. The exact positioning of the non-return valves in the inhalation and exhalation parts of the circuit may affect the effective dead space to some extent, but their presence in both parts, and a small orinasal pocket volume, are critical to minimising carbon dioxide buildup, and consequent hypercapnia. It is also necessary that the orinasal pocket skirt seal against the face between the two inner compartments is effective if the mask relies on non-return valves in the orinasal moulding to prevent backflow to the upper compartment.

The orinasal pocket and one way airflow prevent warm, moisture saturated, exhaled air from flowing over the inside surface of the viewport, which reduces the amount of fogging. The exhaust ports lead from the orinasal pocket to the outside of the mask, either directly, or through ducting in the sides of the mask. An exhaust port at the bottom of the orinasal pocket can drain moderate quantities of water from inside the orinasal chamber. Other positions for exhaust ports have been through alternative snorkel channels, and at the temples, which reduce hydrostatic back pressure at the cost of a longer flow path with more frictional resistance. Manually blocking temple exhaust ports and forcibly exhaling will drain water from the mask interior through a chin drain port. Design details of ducting and valves will affect breathing effort at different flow rates. Variations on this system are used by several manufacturers with a history of manufacturing breathing apparatus for scuba diving and industrial breathing apparatus. They generally provide warnings that the masks are not suitable for freediving or extended exertion.

Unless the snorkeler is able to equalize their ears without pinching their nose, a full-face snorkel mask can only be used at or near the surface, since the design makes it impossible to pinch the nose. A full-face snorkel mask with an orinasal pocket using non-return valves in the ports between the orinasal and main chambers to force a one-way flow of air to minimise dead space cannot be equalised by partially exhaling through the nose or mouth during descent, so will cause mask squeeze if used for diving.

A problem with all full-face breathing masks is that the skirt must fit around the whole face well enough to form a reliable watertight seal, and since no two faces are the same shape, it is necessary for each user to test each model of mask for a good fit. Small amounts of water can be purged through the lower exhaust port where present, but in the event of major flooding, the whole mask must be removed to continue breathing, which requires quick release straps.

Full-face masks are easy to use in ideal conditions, without special knowledge or training, so the user may not learn the skills of quick removal and clearing which may be necessary when conditions are less ideal, and the mask floods or necessary exertion increases carbon dioxide levels. Under these conditions the untrained and unskilled user may react inappropriately or panic, with a risk of drowning. FFSMs are considerably bulkier than half masks, and quite light for their size because of the tough plastic viewport, but the viewport is also easily scratched. Some models can be fitted with optional frames with corrective lenses, and wireless voice communications systems.

As a result of an unusually high number of snorkeling deaths in Hawaii in 2019, there is some suspicion that the design of the masks can result in buildup of excess carbon dioxide, particularly in cheaper versions of full-face snorkel masks marketed by manufacturers with no track record in breathing equipment. High carbon dioxide levels are known to induce discomfort, a feeling of suffocation, an urgent need to breathe, and panic, which may be combined with irrational responses and a high risk of drowning. It is not certain that the masks are at fault, or which models, but the state of Hawaii has begun to track the equipment being used in cases of snorkeling fatalities. Besides the possibility that the masks, or at least some makes of the masks, have excessive dead space and are difficult to quickly remove in an emergency, other theories include the possibility that the masks make snorkeling accessible to people who have difficulty with traditional snorkeling equipment, and that ease of access may result in more snorkelers who lack basic skills and experience or have underlying medical conditions, possibly exacerbating problems that are unrelated to the type of equipment being used.

During the 2019–20 coronavirus pandemic related shortages, some full-face snorkel masks were adapted to use as oxygen dispensing emergency respiratory masks by using 3D printed adaptors and carrying out minimal modifications to the original mask. French sportwear and snorkel masks producer Decathlon temporarily discontinued its sale of snorkel masks, redirecting them toward medical staff, patients and 3D printer operations.

== Associated equipment ==
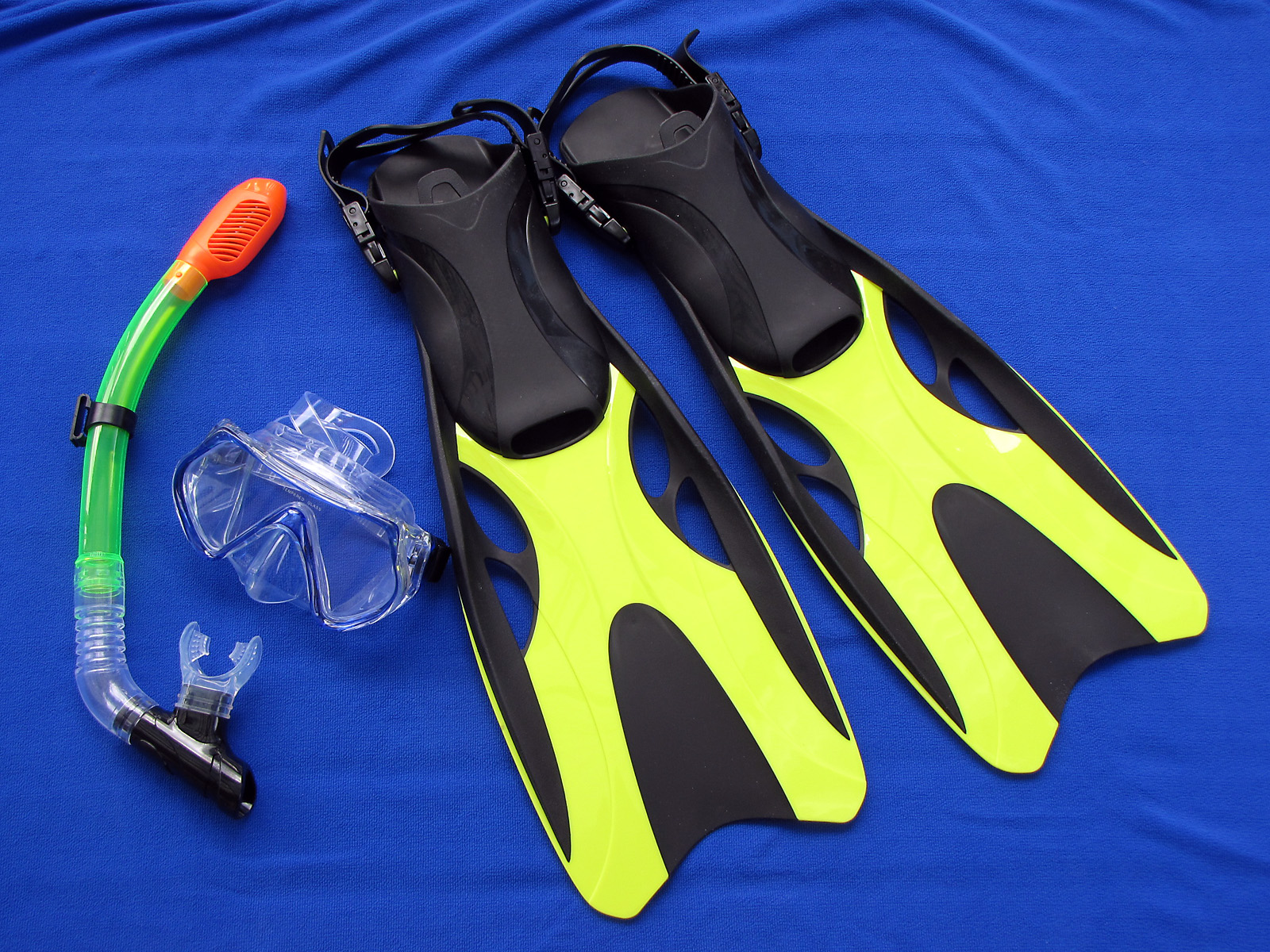
Typical snorkeling equipment: snorkel, diving mask and swimfins.

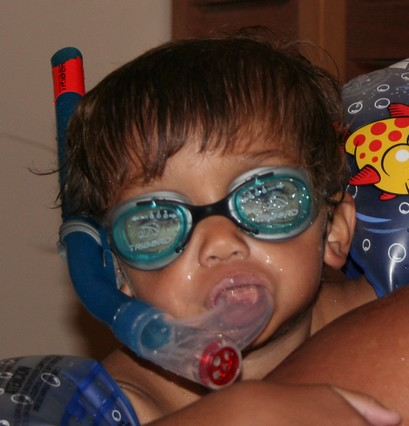
Child's snorkel, worn with swim goggles

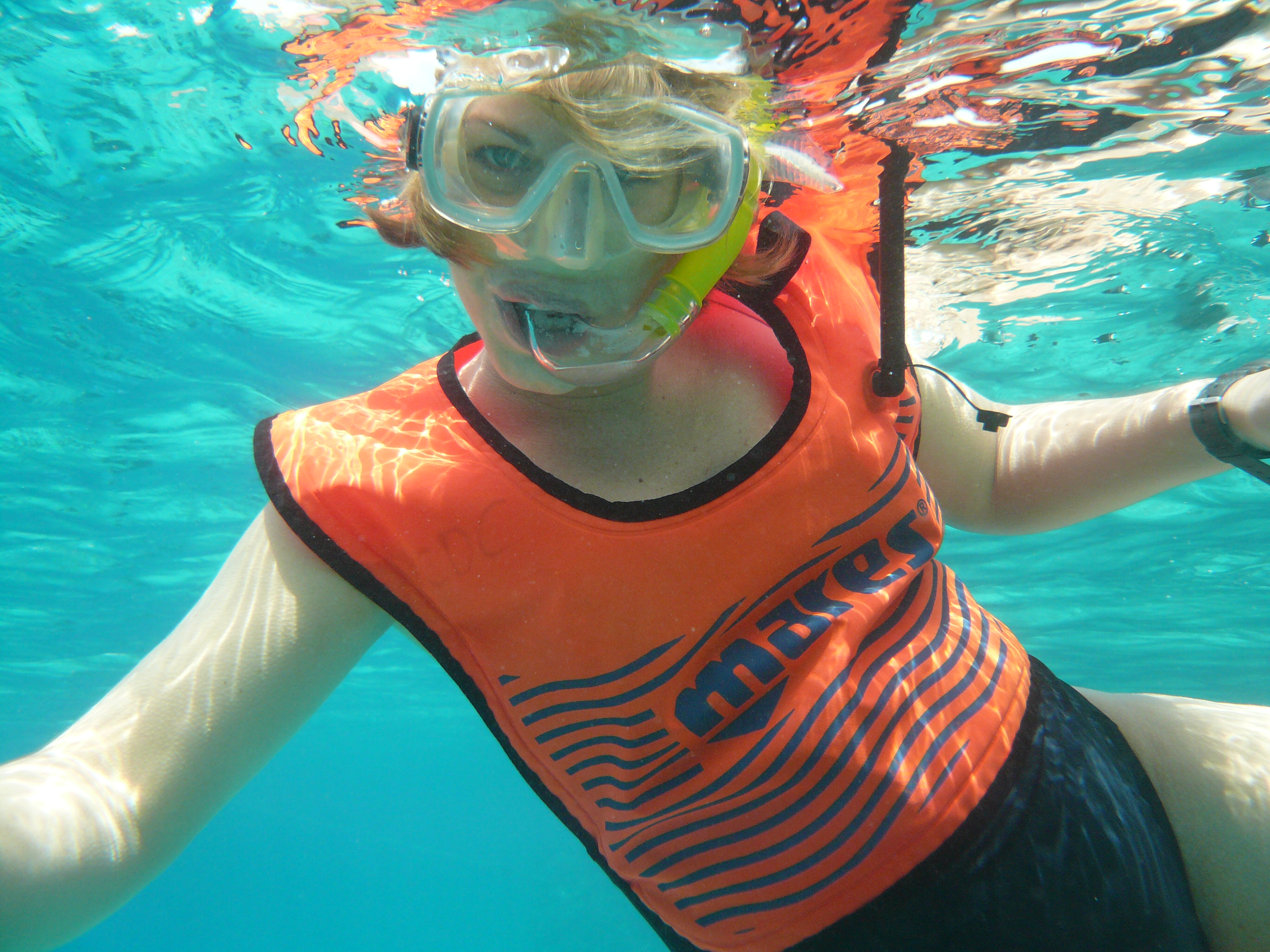
Woman wearing snorkeling vest

Vision aids

If a separate snorkel is used, the user will usually wear a diving half mask or swimming goggles to improve underwater vision. By creating an airspace in front of the cornea, the mask enables the snorkeler to see clearly underwater. Scuba- and freediving masks consist of flat lenses, also known as a faceplate, a soft rubber skirt, which encloses the nose and seals against the face, and a head strap to hold the mask in place. There are different styles and shapes, which range from oval shaped models to lower internal volume masks and may be made from different materials; common choices are silicone and rubber. A snorkeler who remains at the surface can use swimmer's goggles which do not enclose the nose, as there is no need to equalise the internal pressure. In this case a nose clip may be used if needed.

Swimming aids

The most common swimming aids used by snorkellers are swimfins. A snorkelling vest may be used for buoyancy.

Environmental protection

It is common for snorkellers to wear protection against exposure to cold water and the ultra-violet in sunlight. A wetsuit is most popular for thermal protection, and a wetsuit, diving skins or a rash vest provide various levels of UV protection. Often worn by snorkellers during the 1950s and early 1960s, dry suits have seen something of a resurgence in the new millennium for surface snorkelling in lakes and rivers.

== Safety and competition standards ==
To comply with the current European standard EN 1972 (2015), a tube snorkel for users with larger lung capacities should not exceed 38 centimeters (15 in) in length and 230 cubic centimeters (14 cu. in.) in internal volume, while the corresponding figures for users with smaller lung capacities are 35 cm (14 in) and 150 cc (9¼ cu. in.) respectively.

Integrated snorkel masks were specifically excluded from the scope of the world's first national standard on snorkels and face masks, British Standard BS 4532 of 1969: "Combined masks and snorkels in which the snorkel tubes open into the face masks are not acceptable under the terms of this specification". There is currently (2023) no definitive standard for performance of full-face snorkel masks or other forms of integrated mask and snorkel, but there are standards for similar equipment which may be partially applicable, and may be useful to estimate probable safety in the absence of legal requirements.

Current World Underwater Federation (CMAS) Surface Finswimming Rules (2017) require snorkels used in official competitions to have a total length between 43 and 48 cm (17 and 19 in) and to have an inner diameter between 1.5 and 2.3 cm (1/2 and 1 in).

A full-face snorkel mask may be considered as combining the technology of tube snorkels and gas masks, and to a considerably lesser extent, of full-face scuba masks, which combine the technology of gas masks and scuba regulators, but the snorkel mask does not contain a pressure reducing mechanism for breathing gas, and is not intended for use at significant depths underwater. The safety and ergonomic requirements for gas masks are logically the most directly applicable, and some of the requirements for snorkels, such as EN 1972 (Diving equipment – Snorkels – Requirements and test methods), will also apply. Specifically, the maximum dead space volume of 230 cc is relevant, as tube bore and length are not relevant if the breathing passage is a one-way circuit for the tube component, and breathing effort limit of 10 mbar (100 mm water column, 0.1 msw) for both inhalation and exhalation is relevant.

Most functional requirements for compressed air breathing apparatus, such as specified in EN 250 (Respiratory equipment. Open-circuit self-contained compressed air diving apparatus. Requirements, testing, marking), are not logically relevant as the snorkel mask does not use compressed air or supply air at raised ambient pressures.

EN 136 (Respiratory protective devices – Full-face masks – Requirements, testing and marking) has relevance for some aspects of performance, and gives a maximum limit for concentration of carbon dioxide in masks with orinasal pockets of 1% at a ventilation rate of 50 litres per minute The carbon dioxide limit is the same for EN 1972 and EN 136. This criterion has been used by at least one manufacturer of FFSMs.

For comparison, the US Occupational Safety and Health Administration (OSHA) has set limits for the acceptable concentration of carbon dioxide in workplace environments. These are 0.5% by volume (5000 ppm) for continuous exposure, (10-hour shift periods in 40-hour working weeks), and a short term exposure limit of 3% (for periods of up to 15 minutes).

The British Standards Institution published British Standard BS 8647 entitled "Respiratory equipment – Full-face snorkel masks – Specification" in October 2024. This publication is the world's first Standard, national or international, dedicated to regulating snorkel-masks with full-face coverage and enabling the user to breathe through the nose and the mouth.
