= Voit =

Sporting goods manufacturer

Voit (Industrias Voit S.A. de C.V.)
- Trade name: Voit
- Type: S.A.
- Industry: Textile, sports equipment
- Founded: 1922; 104 years ago
- Founder: William J. Voit
- Headquarters: Mexico City, Mexico
- Area served: Worldwide
- Products: Sports equipment, sportswear
- Website: voit.com

Voit (official name: "Industrias Voit S.A. de C.V.") is a sports equipment manufacturing company based in Mexico. The company was founded by German American entrepreneur William J. Voit (1880–1946) of Worthington, Indiana. The current range of products by Voit includes balls (for association and American football, basketball and volleyball), and also goalkeeper gloves, tennis rackets, football uniforms, shin guards, and swimming equipment (suits, goggles, caps, and fins) and accessories (backpacks, bags).

== History ==
Voit began in Los Angeles in 1922 as a tire retreading products factory. In the late 1920s Voit developed and patented the first full-molded, all-rubber inflatable ball and the first needle-type air retention valves. They also developed highly accurate pocket and wrist watches during this period.

Voit V-Shock digital watch

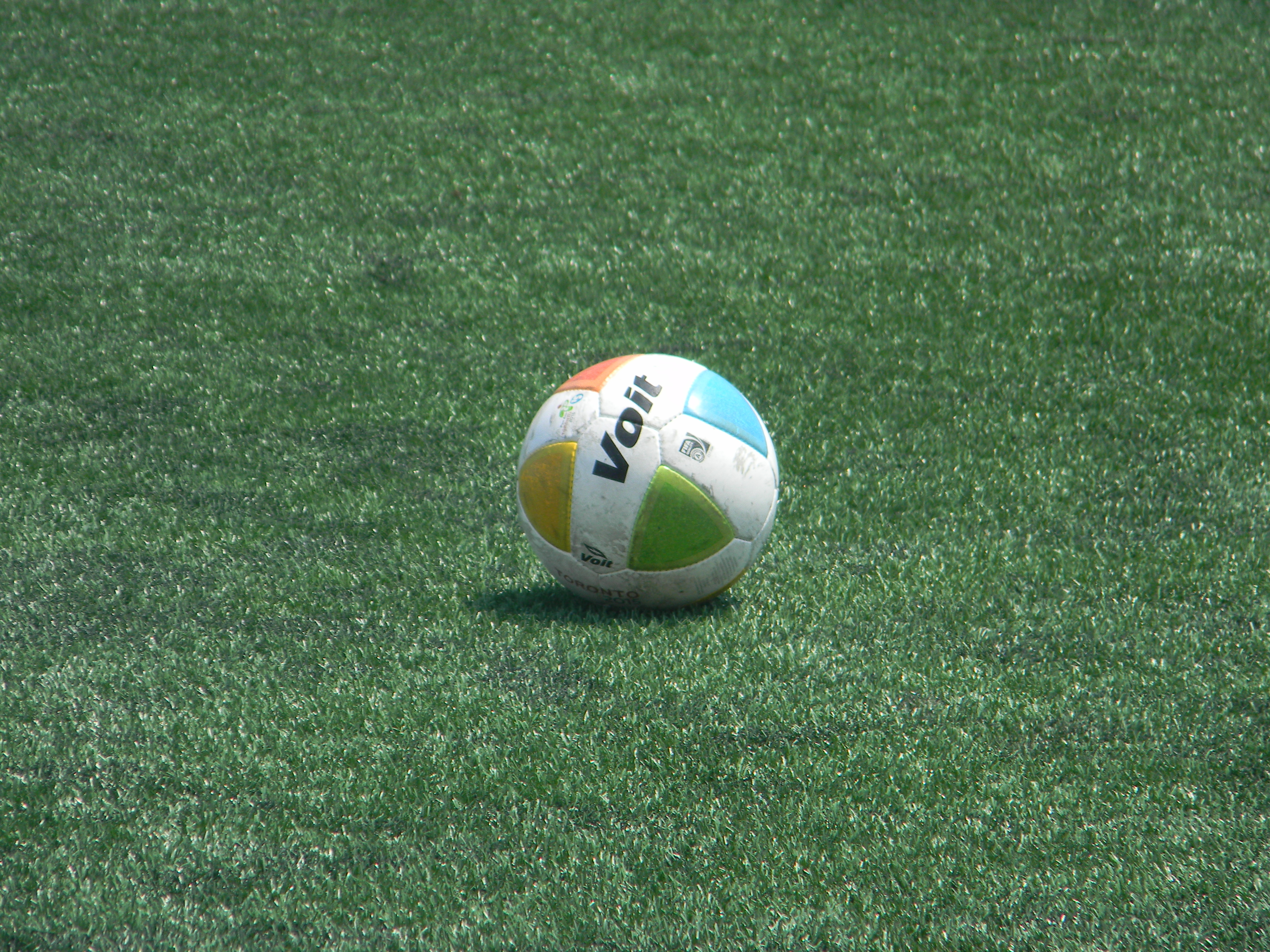
Voit soccerball on Pan Am games 2015

In 1931, Voit developed and patented the first all-rubber athletic balls, including the process of vulcanization which allowed a material to be fixed onto a separate rubber bladder. In the same year, it changed names from the W. J. Voit Corporation to Voit Rubber Corporation.

Later in the 1930s, Voit developed the process of icosahedron winding, which allowed balls to be machine wound with nylon threads over the bladder, providing both strength and consistency in shape and permitting mass production by a machine process.

Those Voit patents and products made possible greatly increased athletic and recreation activity in the school systems, and led to universal use of a new type of product that now dominates sales in its field.

In 1957, the company was purchased by AMF.

Other developments and patents later in the 1950s and 1960s included:

- The Swimaster line of professional dive equipment. Voit was one of the five original American diving gear makers: U.S. Divers, Healthways, "Voit", Dacor, Swimaster.
- The Equi Staff line of professional golf equipment (which included the innovation of the "Power Plugs" or screws to adjust the balance of golf clubs).
- The first rubber-bodied water polo ball (which was adopted as the official ball of college, international and Olympic competitions).

V-Shock, introduced in the late 1990s, was Voit's inexpensive alternative to the Casio G-Shock watches. They have since been discontinued.

== Sponsorships ==
Voit has sponsored the following association football events and athletes:

- (Mexico) Liga MX – official game ball and referee kits
- (Mexico) Necaxa – official kit maker beginning Apertura 2026
- (Costa Rica) Liga FPD – official game ball
- (Guatemala) Liga Nacional (until 2021)
- (Mexico) Óscar Pérez Rojas
