= Dacor (scuba diving) =

Former American diving equipment manufacturer

DIVE DACOR The Professional's Choice
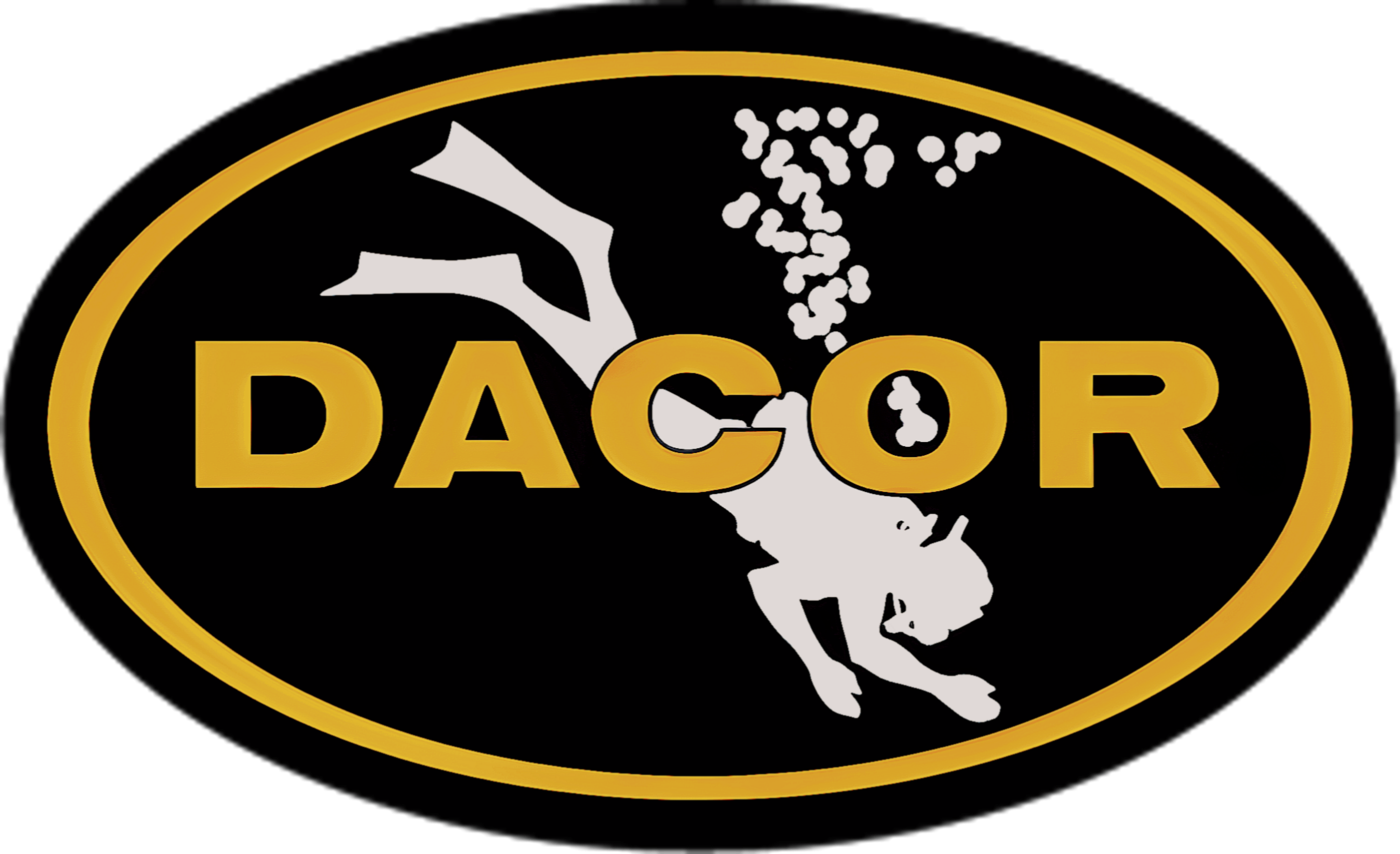
- Genre: Diving equipment
- Founded: 1954 | Evanston, Illinois, United States
- Founder: Jr Samuel M Davison
- Headquarters: Evanston (1955-1959) Skokie (1959-1970) Northfield (1970 - Last), United States
- Key people: Samuel Davison, Donald Davison, Robert Oslon, Wallace Mitchell, Doug McNeal, Gordie Shearer, Jerry Warner, Eric Johnson, Frank Fuentez, Vern Pedersen. Lenny Dwarkins.
- Products: Scuba Equipment: Scuba Regulators, Aluminum Cylinders, Steel Cylinders, Stainless Steel Cylinders (innovation never released), Masks, Snorkels, Fins, Backpacks, Wetsuits, Drysuits, Seachute Jackets, B.C Vests, Nautilus CVS, Lights, Instrumentation Consoles, DIve Watches, Photo Equipment, Knives, Stingray Spearguns, Polespears, Merchandise, Bags, Flags/Floats/Lift Bags, Weight Belts, Books, Schematics, Accessories,
- Website: Domain Not Operational divedacor.com

DACOR Corporation was an American manufacturer of scuba diving equipment which was founded in 1954 by Sam Davison Jr. in Evanston, Illinois as "The Davison Corporation". Since its foundation. DACOR was one of the five early American diving equipment manufacturers.

Together, they were:

- DACOR
- U.S. Divers (Now Aqua-Lung)
- Healthways (Sold to Scubapro in the early 60's)
- Swimaster (Sold to Voit in the early 60's)
- Voit (Sold to AMF somewhere in the late 50's to early 60's)

Star Wars sound designer Ben Burtt around 1977 used a Dacor Dart scuba regulator to create the heavy breathing of the notorious antagonist Darth Vader.
