= Aqua Lung/La Spirotechnique =

French company manufacturing breathing apparatus and diving equipment

Aqualung Group
- Type: Private
- Genre: Diving equipment
- Founded: 1946
- Founder: Jacques-Yves Cousteau and Émile Gagnan
- Headquarters: Sophia Antipolis, France
- Owner: Head Sport GmbH
- Divisions: Aqualung America
- Website: aqualung-group.com

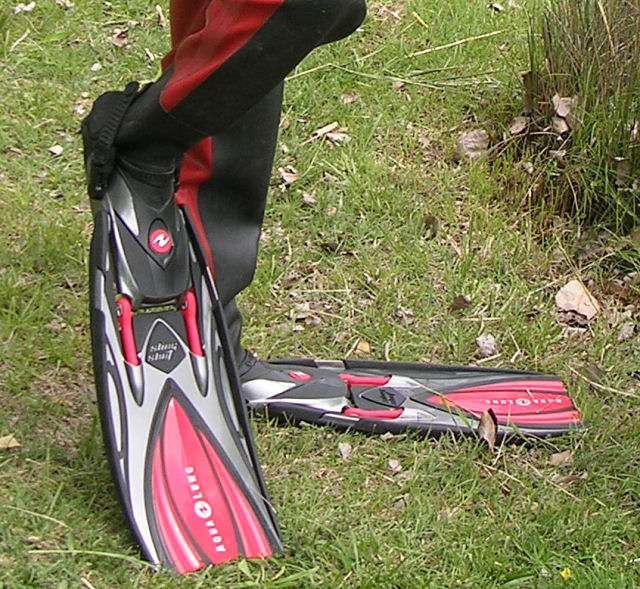
Swimfin from Aqualung

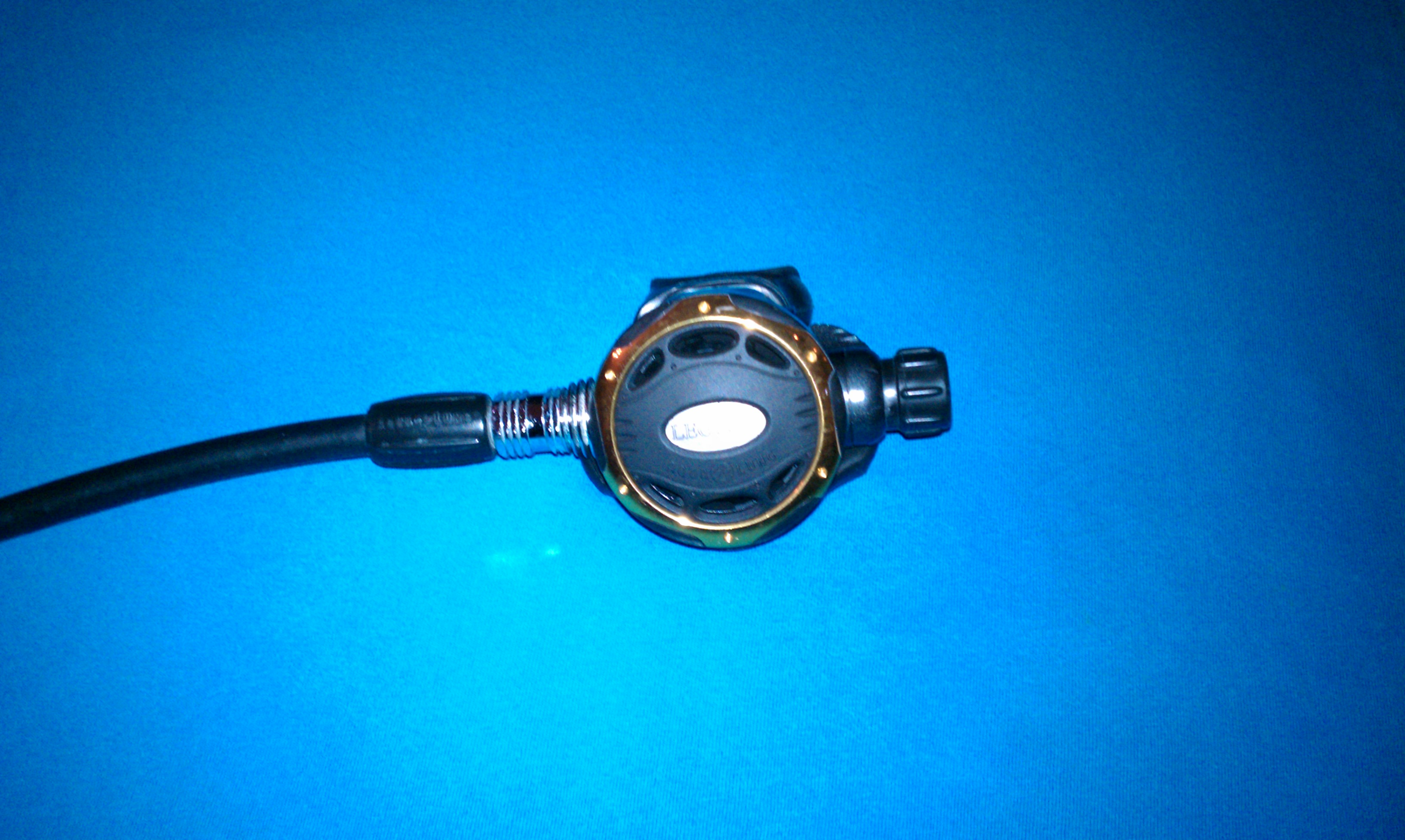
Diving regulator Aqualung Legend (2010)

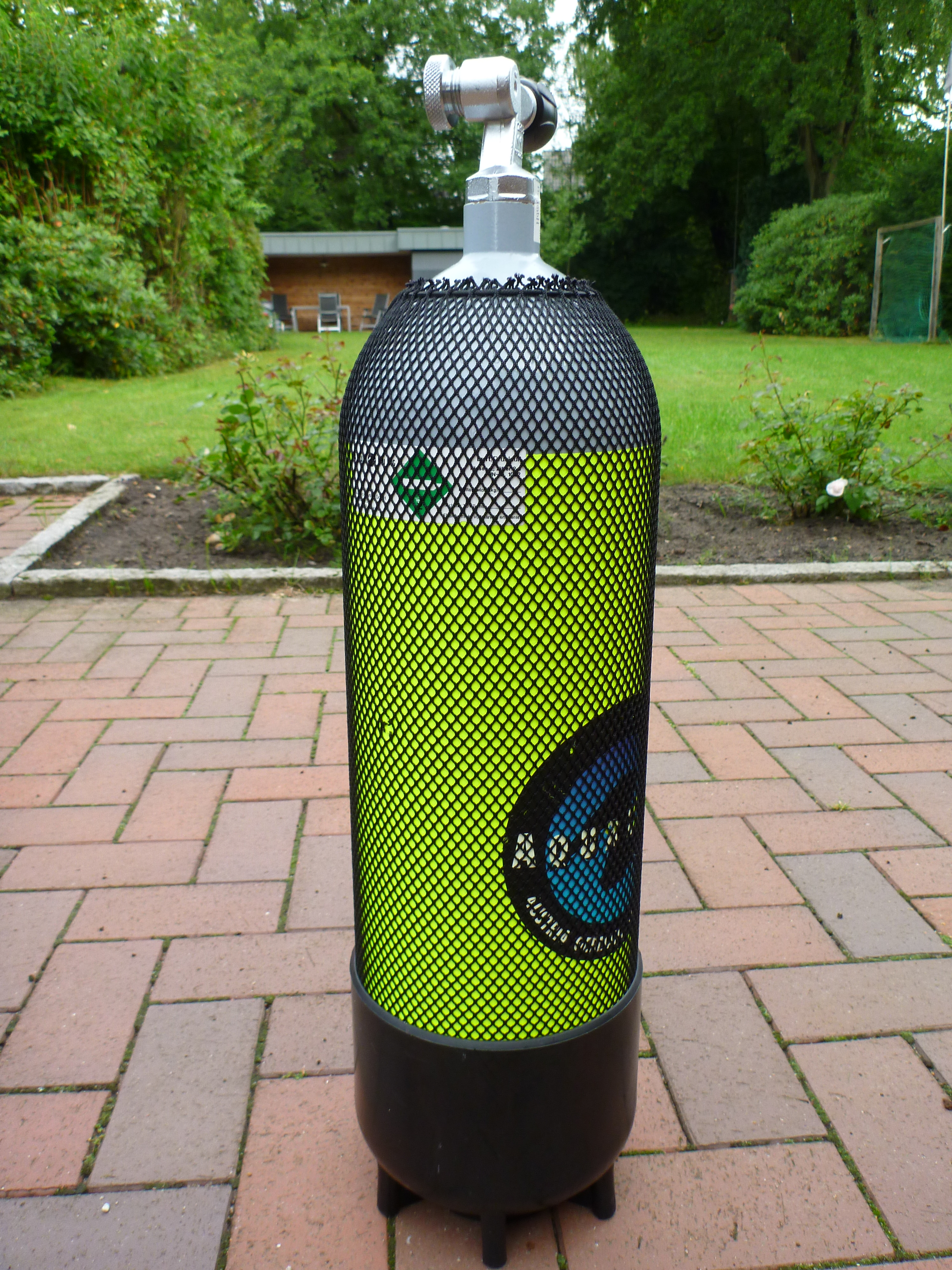
Diving cylinder for 200 Bar with DIN cylinder valve from Aqualung

Aqualung Group (formerly Aqua Lung International, and prior to that La Spirotechnique) is a manufacturer of self-contained breathing apparatus and other diving equipment. It produced the Aqua-Lung line of regulators, including the CG45 (1945) and the Mistral (1955). From its founding in 1946 until 2016, the company was a division of Air Liquide. The company was sold to Montagu Private Equity in 2016, and subsequently acquired by Barings LLC in 2023. In June 2025, Aqualung Group was acquired by Head Group.

== History ==
In December 1942, lieutenant de vaisseau (ship-of-the-Line Lieutenant) Jacques-Yves Cousteau met in Paris for the first time the engineer Émile Gagnan, employee at Air Liquide, a French company specialising in compressed gas. Because of severe fuel restrictions due to the German occupation of France, Gagnan had miniaturized and adapted to gas generators a Rouquayrol-Denayrouze-type regulator. Invented in 1860, adapted to diving in 1864 and mass-produced as of 1865 (when the Ministry of the French Navy ordered the first apparatuses), the Rouquayrol-Denayrouze regulator was being commercialized in 1942 by the Bernard Piel Company, who had inherited the patent. Cousteau requested Gagnan to adapt his new own regulator to diving and both men patented in 1943 the first modern diving regulator.

Early in 1943 Cousteau and Gagnan ordered Air Liquide to make at its factory in Boulogne-Billancourt two scuba set prototypes that Cousteau and Frédéric Dumas used to shoot the underwater film Épaves (Shipwrecks), directed by Cousteau the same year. They were the first modern diving regulators to be made.

In 1946 Air Liquide founded La Spirotechnique, its own division destined to design and mass-produce regulators and other diving equipment. In 1946 La Spirotechnique also launched the CG45, the first modern regulator to be commercialized. The year 1946 represents thus the beginning of the popularisation of scuba diving.

In English-speaking countries the CG45 was commercialized under the name of Aqua-Lung, a word coined by Cousteau himself for that purpose.

In the USA during World War II the American military physician Christian J. Lambertsen designed a wartime frogman's rebreather which in 1952 came to be called the SCUBA (acronym for Self-Contained Underwater Breathing Apparatus), and later the name (changing to 'scuba' and treated as a word) was used to mean any underwater breathing set.

In Britain the word "aqualung" became a generic trademark for open-circuit underwater breathing sets and remained so for many years. The word "scuba" became the generic word quickly in the US and eventually in Britain. For more information see Aqua-lung#Trademark issues.

From 1946 to 1955 La Spirotechnique sold only one model of regulator, the CG45.

In April 1955 it launched the Mistral, a single-stage regulator that was cheaper to build and easier to breathe than the CG45. The Mistral became the brand's spearhead and set off to establish scuba diving across the world. The CG45 and the Mistral were twin-hose regulators, but La Spirotechnique wanted to create a single-hose regulator, to let divers exchange their mouthpieces in narrow underwater caves and hollows, not knowing that in 1952 the Australian Ted Eldred had started to sell the first single-hose regulator, the Porpoise.

In 1955 La Spirotechnique launched its first single hose regulator. Designed by Jean Bronnec and Raymond Gauthier, this regulator was the Cristal, named the Aquamatic in English-speaking countries.

The first American branch of La Spirotechnique was U.S. Divers Company, which first sold aqualungs (CG45, Mistral), Aquamatic (Cristal) and other La Spirotechnique regulators in the United States. At some point La Spirotechnique used the word Aqua Lung to change its name, or to use it as an alternate name.

In 2021, Aqua Lung International became Aqualung Group.

Aqualung Group is based in Carros, near Nice and owns its own international branches around the world, like Aqua Lung America.

Spirotechnique produced the DC55 passive addition sem-closed rebreather.

== Brands and associated product lines ==
- Apeks 1997
- Aqualung
- Aquasphere
- Deep See 1992
- Gorski
- Fenzy 1976
- Omersub 2014
- Pelagic Pressure Systems 2016
- SeaQuest 1990
- Squale
- Technisub 1962/1979
- Whites 2010

FROGS (Full Range Oxygen Gas System) is a model of chest mounted oxygen rebreather for shallow water and special forces operation, which has been used by the French Navy and the Commando Hubert since 15 October 2002. It is made by the diving gear manufacturers Aqualung.

Its working parts are in a dark-blue streamlined rounded shell. It can be worn on the front or on the back. It is rated as duration on a filling: oxygen 4 hours or more, soda-lime 7 hours at 21.1 °C (70 °F). Operational depth range is 0-7m or 0-10m depending on the organisation's code of practice.

It is 48 cm = 19.2 inches high, 30 cm = 12 inches wide, 19 cm = 7.6 inches thick. It weighs 14.2kg = 31.3 pounds out of water.

If the rebreathing loop fails, it can be switched into open-circuit mode bypassing the breathing bag, as bailout.

== Companies ==
- Apeks Marine Equipment Ltd.
- G2000SS, Inc. (Gorski helmets)
- Pelagic Pressure Systems
- White's Manufacturing Ltd.
