= Spearfisherman (company) =

American diving equipment manufacturer

Spearfisherman was a company that made dry suits and fins. Located in Huntington Beach, California, Arthur Brown started it in or before 1945 and sold it to Swimaster in about 1955, which, in turn, was sold to the Voit Rubber Company in the early 1960s.

Swimaster was one of the five original United States diving equipment manufacturers: U.S. Divers, Healthways, Voit, Dacor, and Swimaster.
