= Aqua Lung America =

American company manufacturing recreational diving equipment

Aqualung America
- Type: Subsidiary
- Genre: Diving equipment
- Founded: 1952 (as U.S. Divers Company)
- Founder: René Bussoz, Jacques-Yves Cousteau and Émile Gagnan
- Headquarters: Doral, Florida, United States
- Key people: Don Rockwell (President and CEO)
- Owner: Head Sport GmbH
- Parent: Aqualung Group
- Website: us.aqualung.com

Aqualung America (formerly U.S. Divers Company) is an American company based in Doral, Florida which makes scuba equipment. The company is a division of the Aqualung Group, which was, until 2016, a division of Air Liquide. Aqualung Group was sold by Air Liquide to Montagu Private Equity by the end of 2016. It was acquired by Barings LLC in December 2023.

After U.S. Divers Company was renamed Aqualung America, the name U.S. Divers was retained as a trademark for Aqua Lung's line of snorkelling equipment. In 2024, the U.S. Divers brand was sold to a California-based company called Aqua Master Sporting Technology.

== History ==
The "Aqua-Lung" regulator was created by Jacques-Yves Cousteau and Émile Gagnan in 1943. In 1946, the company known as La Spirotechnique (now Aqua Lung International) was established by both men together with Jean Delorme, CEO of Air Liquide, as a division of Air Liquide to sell the Aqua-Lung regulators.

In the United States, the Aqua-Lung regulator was first sold in the late 1940s by René Sporting Goods, a sporting goods store in Los Angeles, California owned by René Bussoz. He soon obtained a contract with La Spirotechnique to import Aqua-Lung equipment into the United States for sale on the Pacific coast (Spaco, Inc. had the contract for the Atlantic coast).

In 1952, Bussoz changed the name of his company to "U.S. Divers Company" and registered the Aqua-Lung trademark in the United States. In 1957, Bussoz sold the company and the trade names to La Spirotechnique.

Around 2003, U.S. Divers Company was renamed Aqua Lung America after La Spirotechnique changed its name to Aqua Lung International. The U.S. Divers name is maintained as a trademark for Aqua Lung's line of snorkelling equipment.
