= Cerberus (disambiguation) =

Cerberus is a mythical multi-headed dog.

Cerberus may also refer to:

== Arts, entertainment and media ==
=== Fictional entities ===
- Cerberus, in the video game Blood
- Cerberus, a Cardcaptor Sakura character
- Cerberus (Devil May Cry), in the video game Devil May Cry 3: Dante's Awakening
- Cerberus, an Eyeshield 21 character
- Cerberus, in the video game Final Fantasy XIII and Final Fantasy XIII-2
- Cerberus, a group led by the Illusive Man in the video game franchise Mass Effect
- Cerberus, in the film Olympus Has Fallen

=== Works ===
- Cerberus (board game), 1979
- Cerberus (film), a 2005 science fiction movie
- "Cerberus", a song by Amon Düül II from the 1970 album Yeti
- "Cerberus", a 2021 song by Pentagon
- Cerberus: A Wolf in the Fold, a 1982 science fiction novel by Jack L. Chalker

== Military ==
- HMAS Cerberus, the name of several Australian naval bases and ships
- HNLMS Cerberus, the name of several ships of the Royal Netherlands Navy
  - Cerberus-class diving support vessel
- HMS Cerberus, the name of several Royal Navy ships
- HMVS Cerberus, an 1871 warship under various British Commonwealth aegises
  - Cerberus-class monitor
- Operation Cerberus, German codename for a World War II naval engagement in the English Channel
- Project Cerberus, an airborne early warning capability on Royal Navy Westland Sea King helicopters

== Science and technology ==
=== Astronomy ===
- Cerberus (constellation), a group of stars
- Cerberus (Mars), a dark spot on Mars
- 1865 Cerberus, an asteroid

=== Biology ===
- Cerberus (protein), involved in embryological development
- Cerberus (snake), a genus of snakes
- Cerberus (virus) (BQ.1.1), a variant of the SARS-CoV-2 Omicron virus variant

=== Technology ===
- Cerberus (Android), a trojan horse targeting mobile phone banking credentials
- Cerberus (sonar), a diver detection device
- Cerberus FTP Server, file transfer software

== Other uses ==
- Cerberus (mythology), multiple figures from Greek mythology
- Cerberus Capital Management, a private equity investment firm

== See also ==
- Cerebus the Aardvark, a comic book series
- Kerberos (disambiguation)
