= HNLMS Triton =

Several ships of the Royal Netherlands Navy have been named HNLMS Triton:

- HNLMS Triton (A828), a former auxiliary ship that served between 1948 and 1953
- HNLMS Triton (A848), an Triton-class diving support vessel
