= Saturation diving system =

Facility for supporting saturation diving projects

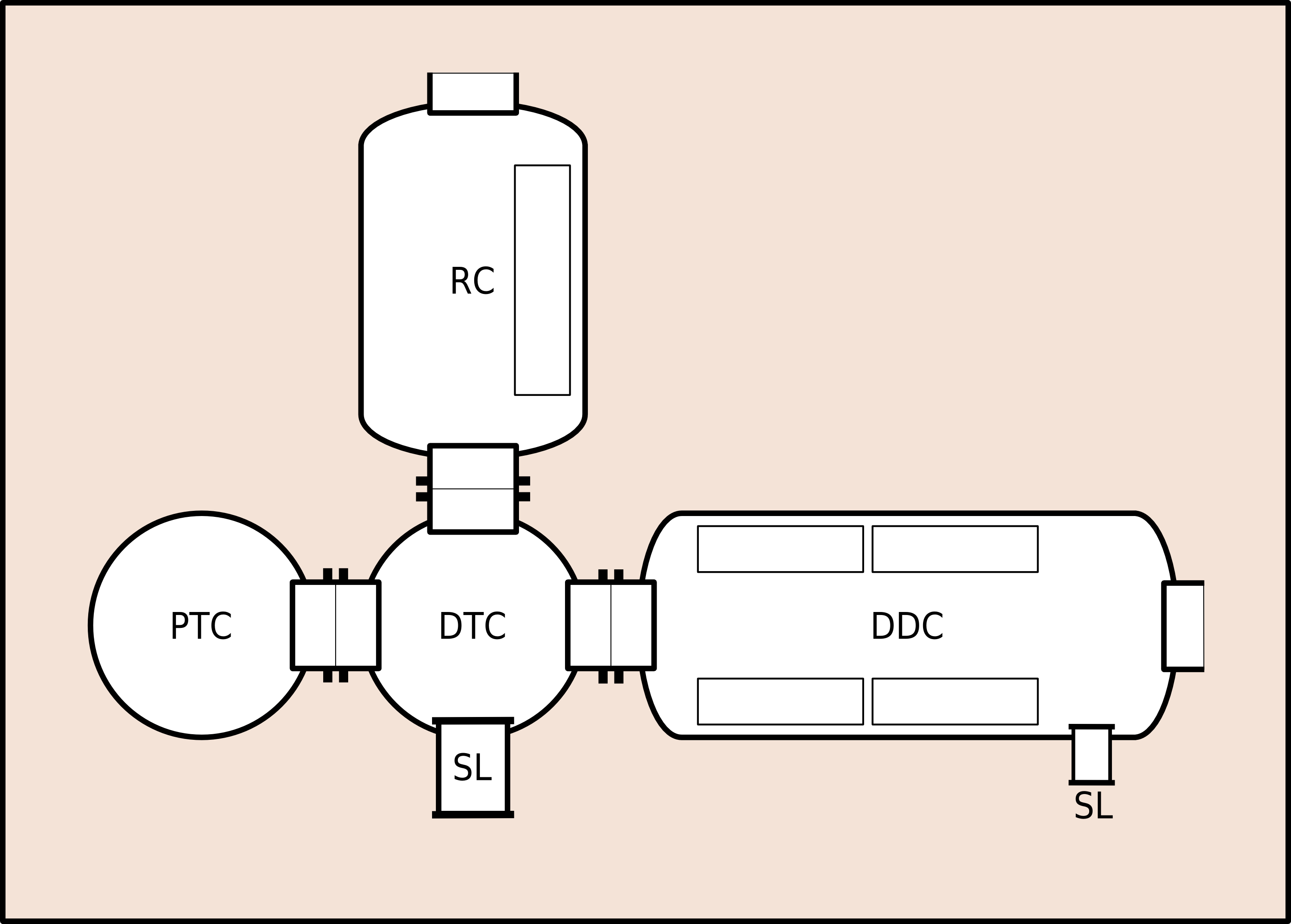
Schematic plan of a simple saturation system showing the main pressure vessels for human occupation DDC – Living chamber DTC – Transfer chamber PTC – Personnel transfer chamber (bell) RC – Recompression chamber SL – Supply lock

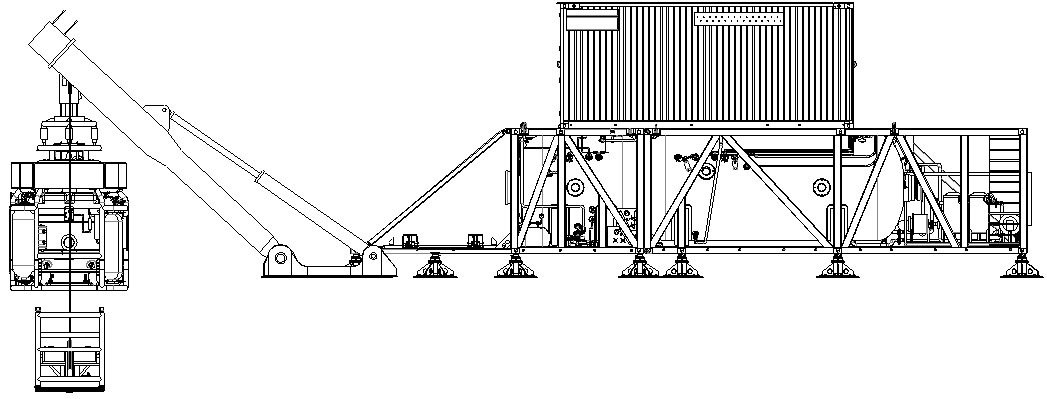
Illustration of US Navy Saturation Fly-away Decompression System

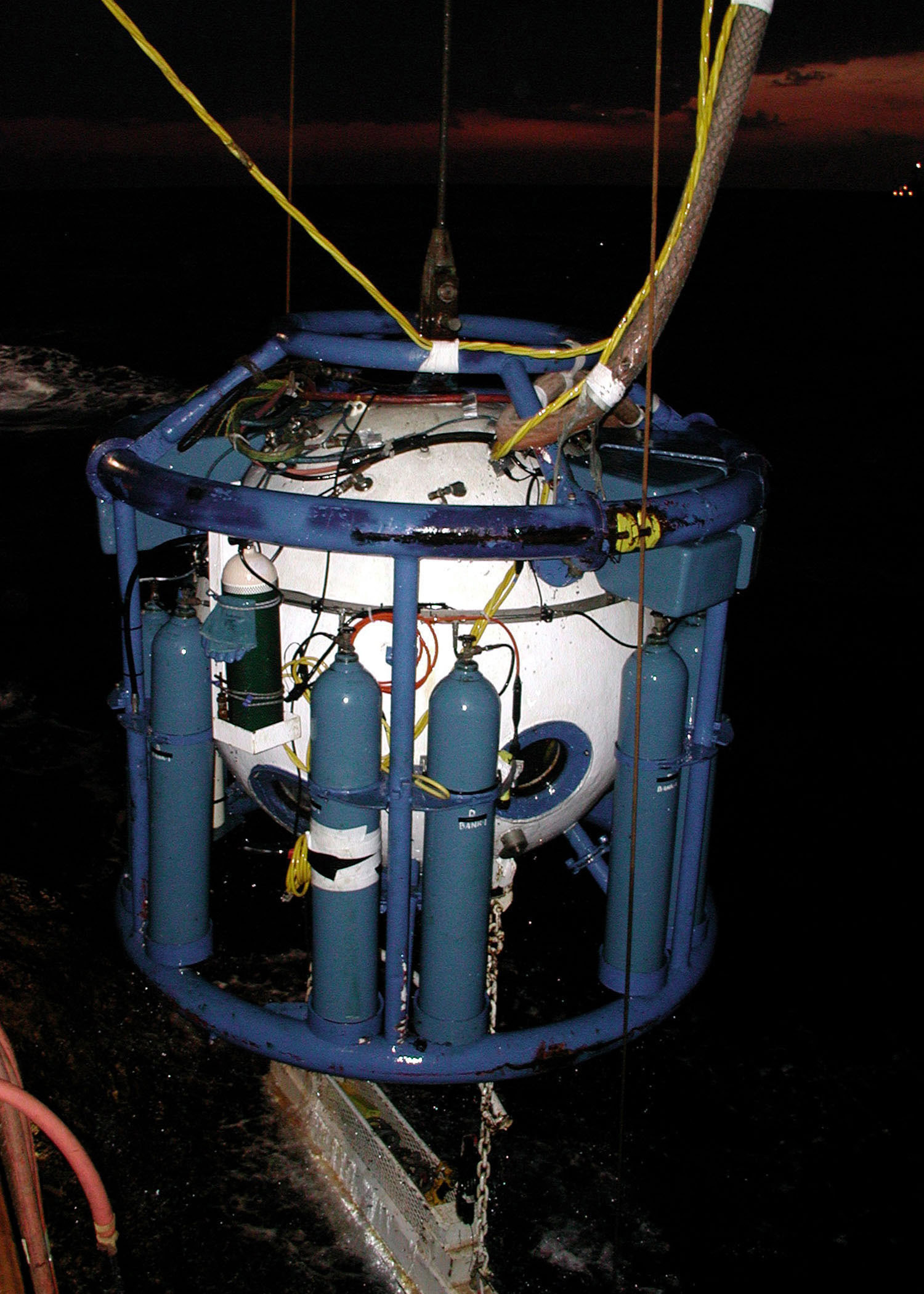
Personnel Transfer Capsule.

A saturation diving system is the combined and installed equipment required to support a saturation diving operation. It may be an underwater habitat, or more commonly for commercial diving operations, a hyperbaric habitat complex, known in the industry as a saturation spread, assembled on a surface platform, supported by a range of surface support equipment, some of which is common to other surface-supplied diving activities, and some of which is used mostly or only for saturation diving. Much of the equipment can be classed as life-support equipment, and some of it is required for emergency and rescue functions.

The basic components include living space accommodations for the divers when they are not diving, with sanitation facilities and a means of providing supplies to the occupants. There are also facilities for compression and decompression, treatment of dysbaric maladies, transfer under pressure between accommodation and closed bell transportation modules for transport between the accommodation and workplace, and for emergency evacuation. Units are interconnected by trunking and can be isolated by airlock doors.

Auxiliary and support equipment includes:

- The hyperbaric life support systems
  - Breathing gas supply and distribution, and recycling and purification. The divers use surface-supplied umbilical diving equipment, using a breathing gas suitable for the depth, such as helium and oxygen mixtures, stored in large capacity, high pressure gas storage cylinders.
  - Thermal management and climate control: heating and cooling for the chambers and the divers in the water.
- Diving bell launch and recovery system
- Control rooms for diving operations and saturation system life support
- Diver voice communications systems, which may include helium speech unscramblers
- Built-in breathing systems
- Fire suppression systems
- Hyperbaric evacuation and rescue systems

== Saturation diving ==
Saturation diving is an ambient pressure diving technique which allows a diver to remain at working depth for extended periods during which the body tissues become saturated with metabolically inert gas from the breathing gas mixture. Once saturated, the time required for decompression to surface pressure will not increase with longer exposure. The diver undergoes a single decompression to surface pressure at the end of the exposure of several days to weeks duration. The ratio of productive working time at depth to unproductive decompression time is thereby increased, and the health risk to the diver incurred by decompression is minimised. Unlike other ambient pressure diving modes, the saturation diver is only exposed to external ambient pressure while at diving depth. The divers operate in teams comprising one or two working divers and a bellman, for shifts (bell runs) which may be up to 8 hours in duration. A saturation system provides the infrastructure to support this mode of diving, and comprises a combination of special purpose equipment operated by a team of specialist personnel.

Besides the divers in saturation, the diving team includes diving supervisors, surface standby divers and their dive tenders, gas panel operators, life support technicians, and other diving systems technicians. medical support. food and laundry are usually provided by ship's services if available, and locked in and out of the accommodation.

== Architecture of a surface saturation facility ==
Saturation diving systems are made up from a group of pressure vessels for human occupancy, and their support systems. The pressure chambers are subject to rules for life support, operations, maintenance, and structural design. The "saturation system", "saturation complex" or "saturation spread" typically comprises either an underwater habitat or a surface complex which includes one or more living chambers, a transfer chamber, at least one supply lock, and a submersible decompression chamber, which is commonly referred to in commercial diving and military diving as the diving bell, personnel transfer capsule (PTC), or submersible decompression chamber (SDC). The system can be permanently installed on a ship or ocean platform, but is more commonly capable of being moved from one vessel to another by crane. To facilitate transportation of the components, it is standard practice to construct the components as modular units based on the intermodal container system, some of which may be stackable to save deck space. The entire system is managed from a control room ("van"), where pressure (depth), chamber atmosphere and other system parameters are monitored and controlled. The diving bell is the elevator or lift that transfers divers from the accommodations to the work site. Typically, it is mated to the system utilizing a removable clamp and is separated from the transfer chamber shell by a trunking spool through which the divers transfer between bell and transfer chamber. At the completion of a contract or mission, the saturation divers are decompressed gradually back to atmospheric pressure by the slow release of system pressure. The process normally involves only one decompression, thereby mitigating the time-consuming and comparatively risky process of in-water staged decompression, or surface decompression (sur-D O_{2}) operations normally associated with non-saturation mixed gas diving. More than one living chamber can be linked to the transfer chamber through trunking so that diving teams can be stored at different depths where this is a logistical requirement. Extra chambers can be fitted to transfer personnel into and out of the system while under pressure and to treat divers for decompression sickness if this should be necessary.

The divers use surface-supplied umbilical diving equipment, usually utilizing deep diving breathing gas, such as helium and oxygen mixtures, stored in large capacity, high pressure gas storage cylinders. The gas supplies are plumbed to the control room, from where they are routed to supply the system components. The bell is fed via a large, multi-part umbilical that supplies breathing gas, electricity, communications and hot water. The bell is also fitted with externally mounted breathing gas cylinders for emergency use.

While in the water the divers will often use a hot water suit to protect against the cold. The hot water comes from heaters at the surface and is pumped down to the diver via the bell's umbilical and then through the diver's umbilical.

=== Accommodation chambers ===
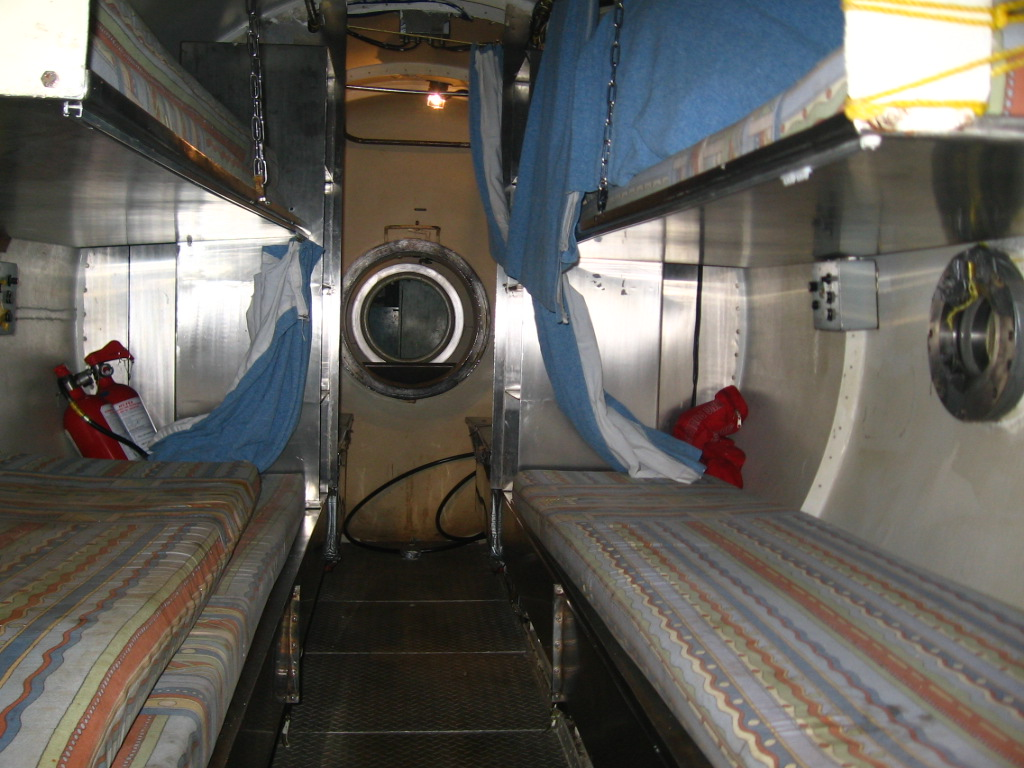
Accommodation chamber of a saturation spread

The accommodation chambers are where the divers live when they are not diving. They include facilities for eating, personal hygiene, sleeping and recreation. It is also where the divers are compressed and decompressed, and where they prepare for diving and clean up after diving. An accommodation chamber may be as small as 100 square feet, but the chamber size of modular systems is mainly constrained by the space available in a 40 ft intermodal container frame for each modular component. The accommodation area is generally made of multiple compartments, each separate unit joined to the rest of the system by short lengths of cylindrical trunking (manways) for access. It is usually possible to isolate each compartment from the others using internal pressure doors at each manway and at each external access point. Catering and laundry are provided from outside the system and locked in and out as required. A modular chamber may be 2.3m diameter or less. Accommodation may be provided for up to 24 divers in a large system, which would probably have two 3-diver bells and allow for split level diving. Where a hyperbaric lifeboat or escape module is provided there will be escape trunking fitted between the accommodation and the rescue and escape system module. The rescue and escape module or modules must be sufficient for all divers in saturation, so there may be more than one of them.

=== Transfer chamber ===
The transfer chamber, also known as a wet pot, is where the bell is mated to the surface saturation system for transfer under pressure (TUP). It is a wet surface chamber where divers prepare for a dive and strip off and clean their gear after return. Connection to the bell may be overhead, through the bottom hatch of the bell, or lateral, through a side door. The transfer chamber may also serve as a shower and toilet compartment in a small system. In a more complex system each living chamber may have its own wet pot shower and toilet chamber, which makes split level diving more convenient. A large system with two bells may have two transfer chambers, which can be isolated from each other and used simultaneously at different storage pressures.

=== Personnel transfer capsule ===
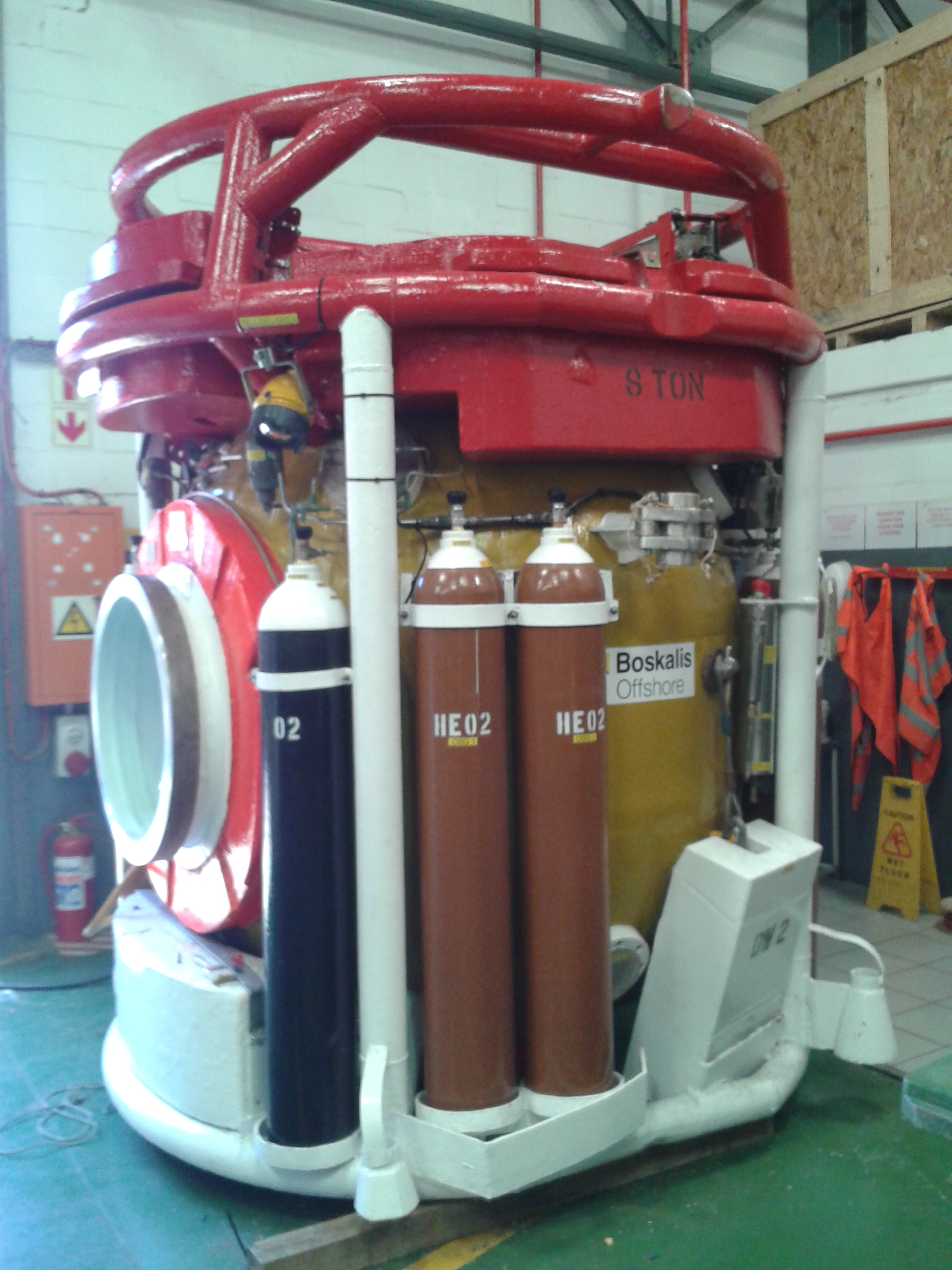
Closed diving bell

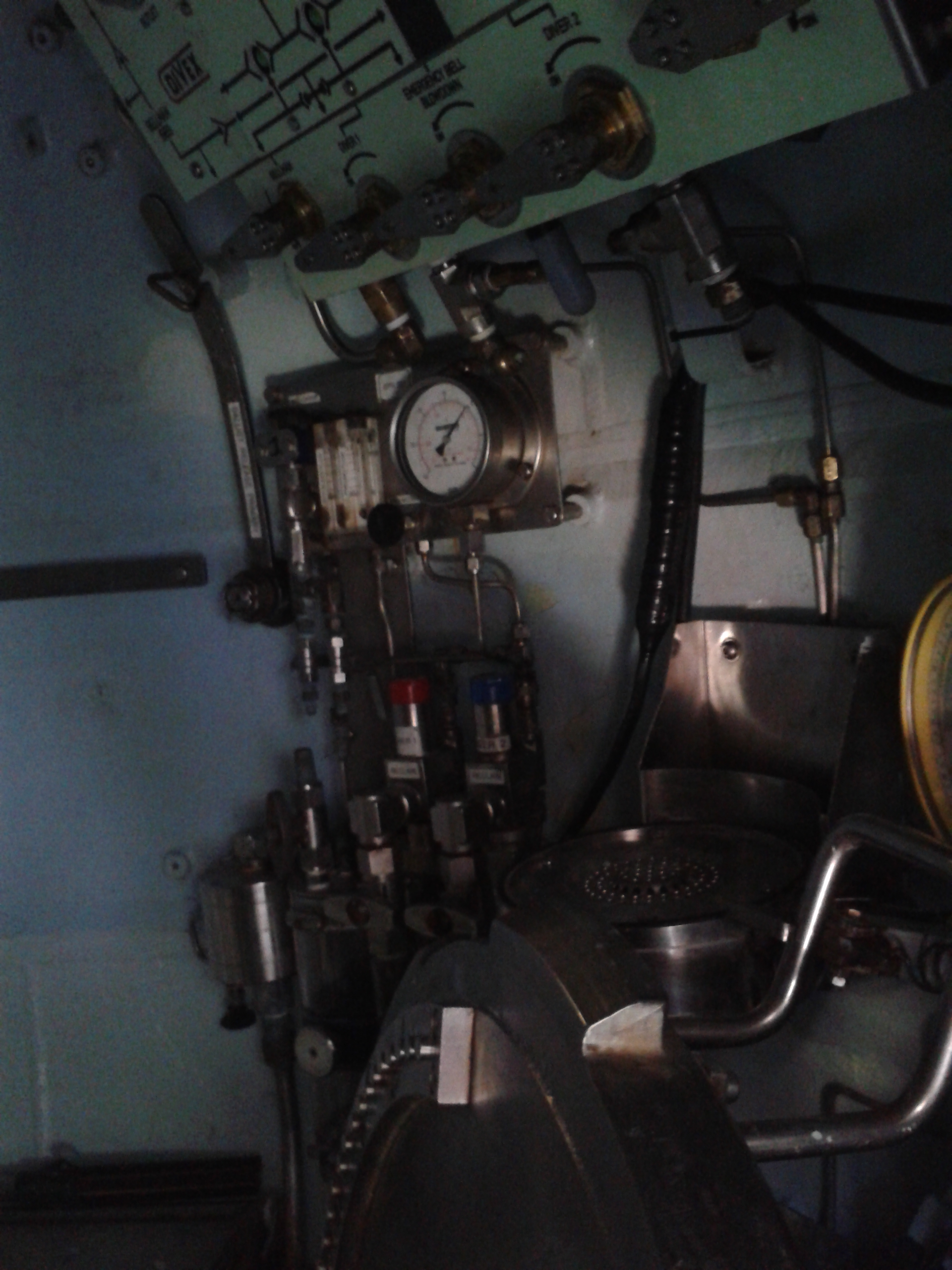
Interior of a closed diving bell showing part of the gas panel

A closed diving bell, also known as personnel transfer capsule or submersible decompression chamber, is used to transport divers between the underwater workplace and the accommodations chambers. The bell is a domed end cylindrical or spherical pressure vessel with a hatch at the bottom, and may mate with the surface transfer chamber at the bottom hatch or at a side door. Bells are usually designed to carry two or three divers, one of whom, the bellman, stays inside the bell at the bottom and is stand-by diver to the working divers. Each diver is supplied by an excursion umbilical from inside the bell. The bell has a set of high pressure gas storage cylinders mounted on the outside containing on-board reserve breathing gas. The on-board gas and main gas supply are distributed from the bell gas panel, which is controlled by the bellman. The bell may have viewports and external lights. The divers' umbilicals are stored on racks inside the bell during transfer, and are tended by the bellman during the dive.

=== Bell handling system ===
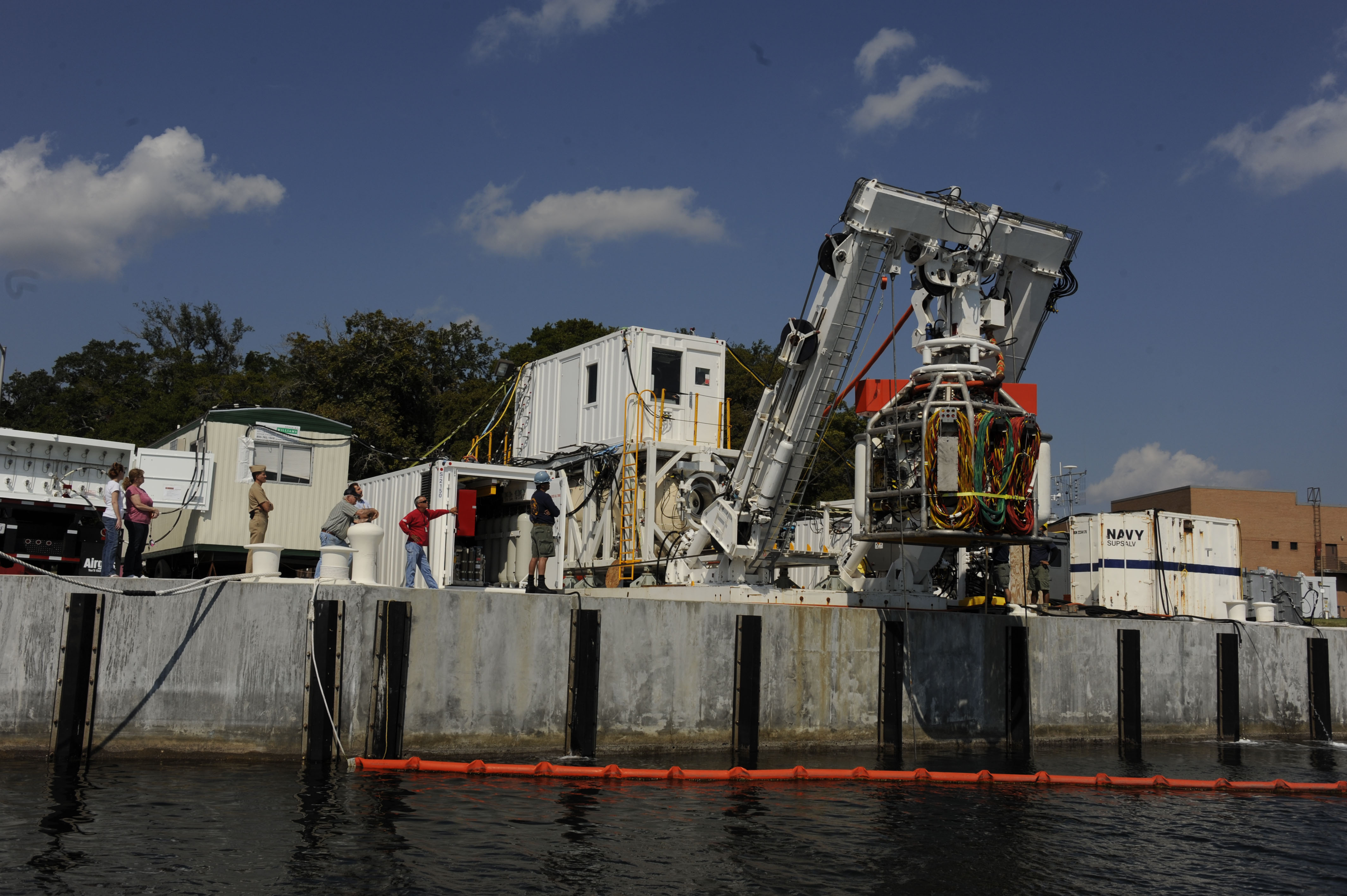
The bell handling system lowers the diving bell of the US Navy's saturation fly-away diving system into the water

The bell is deployed from a gantry or A-frame, also known as a bell launch and recovery system (LARS), on the vessel or platform, using a winch. Deployment may be over the side or through a moon pool.

The bell handling system must be able to support the dynamic loads imposed by operating in a range of weather conditions, and must be able to move the bell through the air/water interface (splash zone) in a controlled way, fast enough to avoid excessive movement caused by wave action. It must have sufficient power for fast retrieval of the bell in an emergency, and fine control to facilitate mating of the bell and transfer flange, and to accurately place the bell at the bottom. It must keep the bell clear of the vessel or platform to prevent impact damage or injury. A bell cursor may be used to limit lateral motion through and above the splash zone.

The bell handling system must include a system to move the bell between the mating flange of the transfer chamber and the launch and retrieval position. Heave compensation gear may be used to maintain a constant operating depth in a seaway.

=== Decompression chamber ===
A decompression/recompression chamber may be included in the system so that divers can be given treatment for decompression sickness without inconveniencing the rest of the occupants. The decompression chamber may also be used as an entry lock, and to decompress occupants who may need to leave before scheduled. In a large, split level system two decompression chambers may be provided. This chamber can be used to decompress divers leaving saturation while the next team is compressed in the living chambers

=== Mating flange for transportable chamber ===
One or more of the external doors may be provided with a mating flange or collar to suit a portable or transportable chamber, which can be used to evacuate a diver under pressure. The closed bell can be used for this purpose, but lighter and more easily portable chambers are also available. There will usually also be a mating flange for the hyperbaric rescue and escape system.

=== Supply lock ===
A small lock, also known as an equipment lock or medical lock, is used for transfer of supplies into and out of the pressurized system. This would normally include food, medical supplies, clothing, bedding etc. Various diameters are available, and a supply lock can be an integral part of a chamber or a bolt-on item connected to a general purpose access flange. The outer door of a supply lock is usually hinged to open outwards, as there is not usually enough space inside to hinge inwards, particularly if the lock is filled with supplies. To prevent potential catastrophic failure of pressure-tight integrity of the system, a mechanical interlock is required that physically prevents opening of the door while there is a pressure difference over the door.

=== Trunking ===
The pressurised compartments of the system are connected through access trunking (also known as manways): relatively short and small diameter cylindrical spools bolted between the external flanges of the larger compartments, with pressure seals, forming passageways between the chambers, which can be isolated by pressure doors. Trunking diameter tends to be consistent across a saturation system and a common inside diameter is about 600mm to 800mm. Wall thickness and flange and bolt dimensions must be compatible with maximum working pressure of the system. Trunking must allow access depending on application. Vertical access through the bottom hatch of a bell underwater must have space for the diver's bailout set.

== Life support systems ==
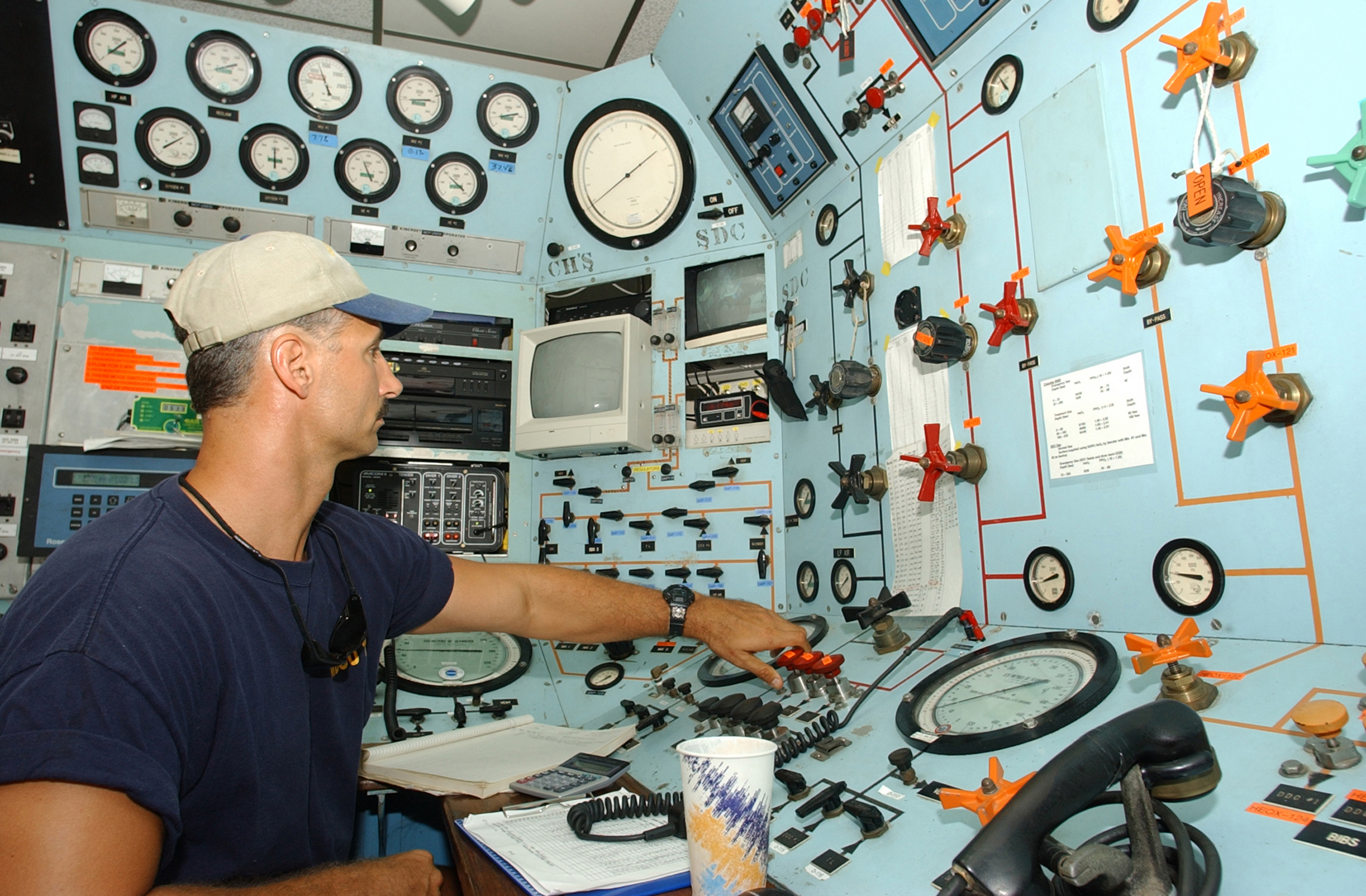
Saturation system control panel

The life support system provides breathing gas and other services to support life for the personnel under pressure. It includes the following components:

- Breathing gas supply, distribution and recycling equipment: scrubbers, filters, gas boosters, compressors, mixing, monitoring, and storage facilities
- Chamber climate control system – control of temperature and humidity, and filtration of gas
- Instrumentation, control, monitoring and communications equipment
- Fire suppression systems
- Sanitation systems

The life support system for the bell provides and monitors the main supply of breathing gas, and the control station monitors the deployment and communications with the divers. Primary gas supply, power and communications to the bell are through a bell umbilical, made up from a number of hoses and electrical cables twisted together and deployed as a unit. These services are extended to the divers through the diver umbilicals (excursion umbilicals). The accommodation life support system maintains the chamber environment within the acceptable range for health and comfort of the occupants. Temperature, humidity, breathing gas quality, sanitation systems, and equipment function are monitored and controlled.

Each diver is provided with underwater breathing apparatus, which is usually a lightweight demand helmet, but could also be an equivalent band mask, which can be open-circuit or use a gas reclaim system to recover most of the helium based gas. The breathing apparatus is supplied from the surface via the bell and excursion umbilicals, or from the bell emergency gas supply, or the diver's personal bailout set, which may be open of closed circuit. The diver also wears thermal protection in the form of a hot water suit, dry suit or wetsuit depending on the water temperature and depth.

=== Breathing gas management ===
A breathing gas for saturation diving must be suitable for use over a period of several weeks without unacceptable risk of permanent harmful effects on the diver. There must be sufficient oxygen to maintain normal metabolism, but not so much as to present toxicity problems or a raised fire hazard. It must support life during significant short term changes in pressure which may occur during the course of a planned dive or reasonably foreseeable contingency, and should allow the safest and most efficient reasonably practicable decompression. It must have a low enough density that work of breathing is acceptable, and must not cause other excessive detriments to the diver's performance or health. The requirements, and therefore the preferred mixture, vary between different stages of the overall saturation exposure, so different gas mixtures may be used during blowdown and day-to-day living in the surface chambers (storage), diving excursions in and from the bell, and normal or emergency decompression. Keeping the gas within the requirements for each of these applications may necessitate more than one supply in use when divers are locked out of storage, and constant monitoring and adjustment of the accommodation atmosphere. Pressure in the chambers of the saturation system is maintained by blowdown of breathing gas of the correct composition from high pressure storage, and by adding oxygen as required to maintain the required partial pressure.

==== Bulk gas supplies ====
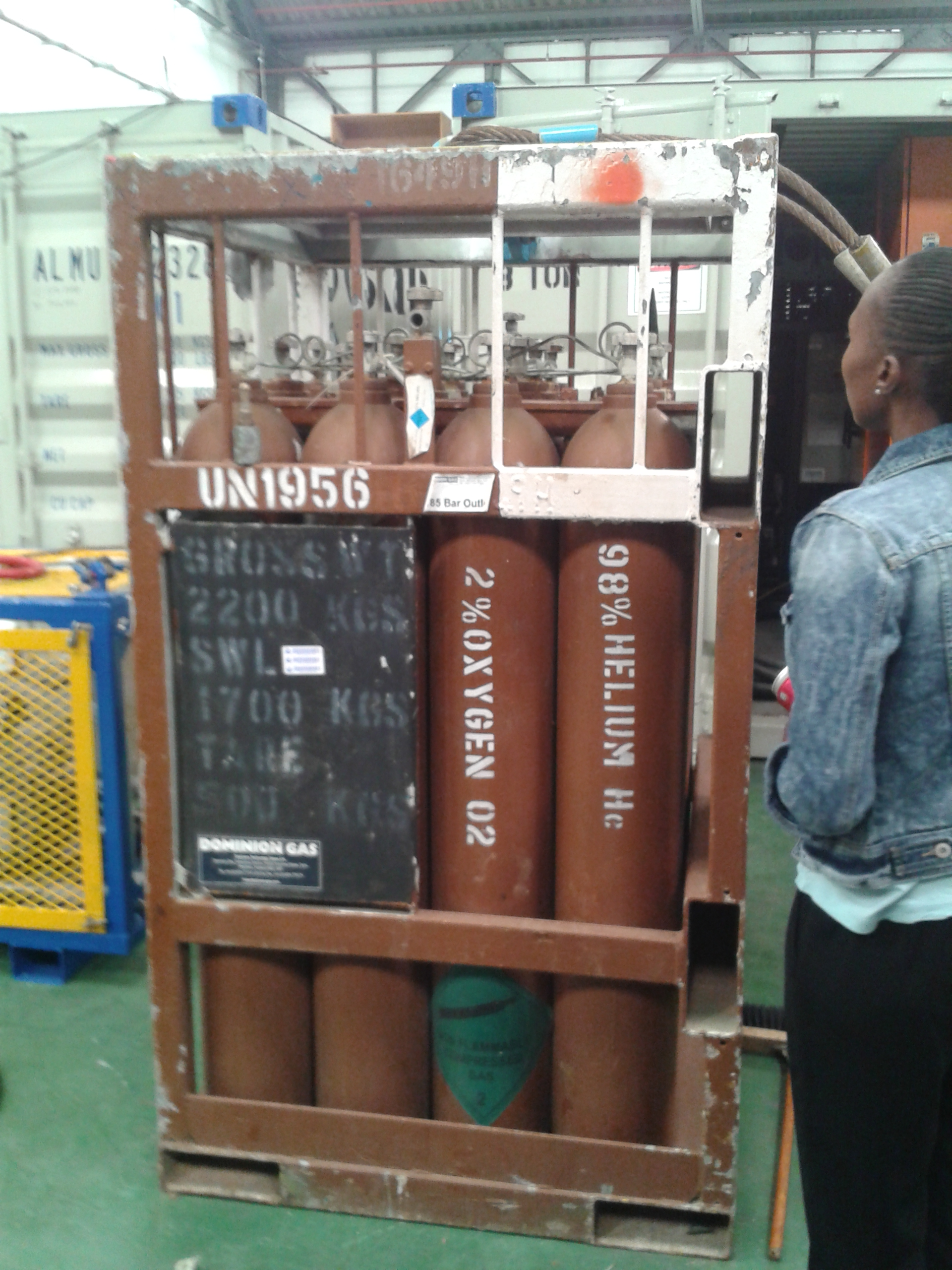
Helium Quad: breathing gas storage asset

Gas storage and blending equipment are provided to pressurize and flush the system, and treatment gases should be available appropriate to the planned storage depths. Bulk stock of premixed gas is usually provided to suit the planned depth of the operation, and separate bulk stock of helium and oxygen to make up additional requirements, maintain chamber gas composition as the oxygen is used up by the occupants, and control its composition during decompression.

Bulk gas is usually stored in manifolded groups of storage cylinders known as "quads", which usually carry about 16 high pressure cylinders, each of about 50 litres internal volume mounted on a frame for ease of transport, or larger frames carrying larger capacity high pressure "tubes". These tube frames are usually designed to be handled by intermodal container handling equipment, so are usually made in one of the standard sizes for intermodal containers.

==== Gas distribution ====
The gas management and distribution of a saturation system will typically include bulk gas storage cylinders, gas transfer compressors or boosters, gas reclaim system (helium recovery system) and gas distribution panels and piping systems. This equipment may be located away from the accommodation and bell handling equipment if that is more convenient, but will be connected to it by pipes or hoses. Continuous monitoring of the breathing gases in use will generally be done at the saturation control room.

==== Built-in breathing systems ====
Built in breathing systems are installed for emergency use and for treatment of decompression sickness. They supply breathing gas appropriate to the current function, which is supplied from outside the pressurized system and also vented to the exterior, so the exhaled gases do not contaminate the chamber atmosphere.

==== Gas reclaim systems ====
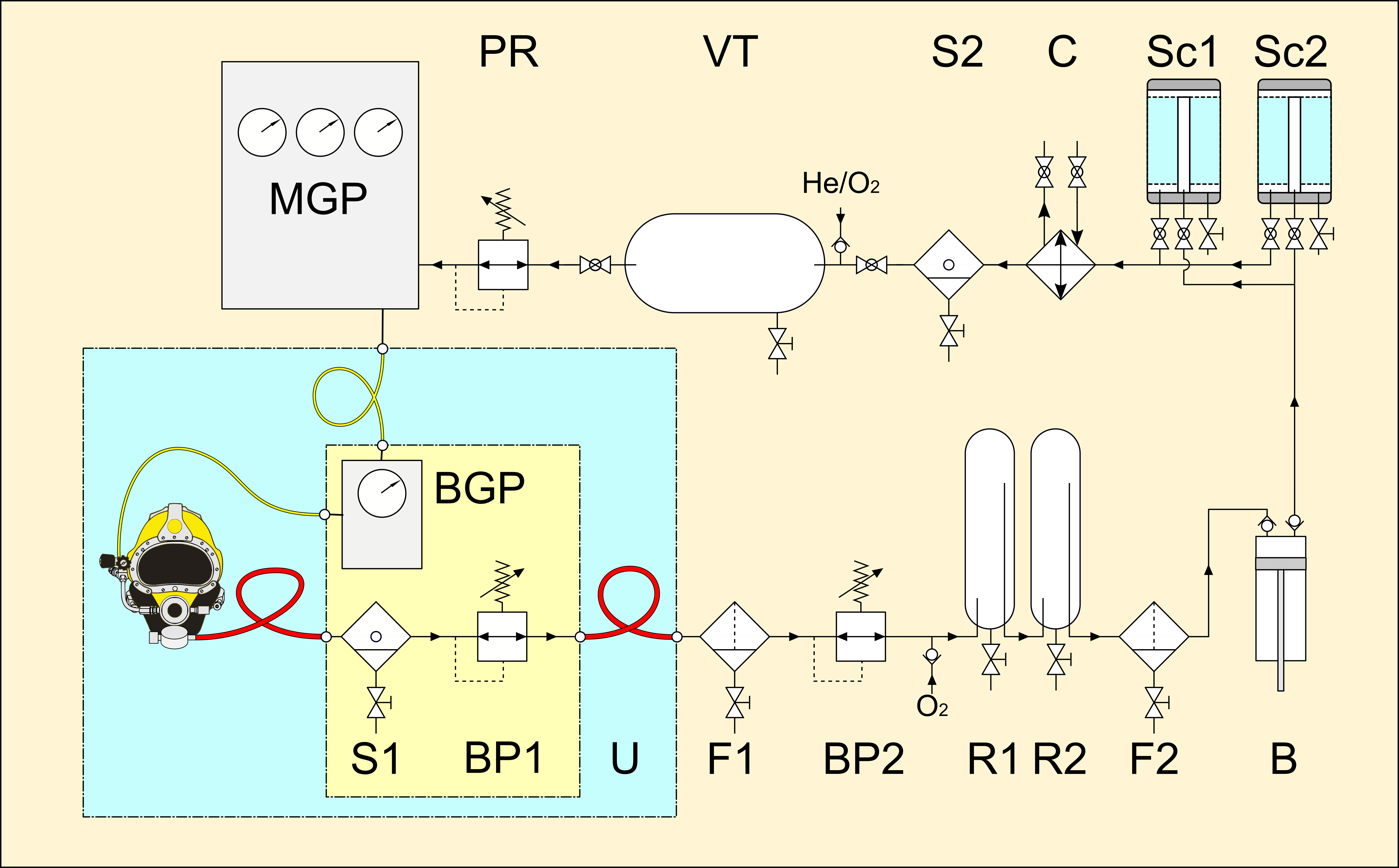
Schematic diagram of a heliox breathing gas reclaim system: BGP: bell gas panel; S1: first water separator; BP1: bell back-pressure regulator; U: bell umbilical; F1: first gas filter; BP2: topside back-pressure regulator; R1, R2: serial gas receivers; F2: second gas filter; B: booster pump; Sc1, Sc2: parallel scrubbers; C: gas cooler; S2: last water separator; VT: volume tank; PR: pressure regulator; MGP: main gas panel

A helium reclaim system (or push-pull system) may be used to recover helium based breathing gas after use by the divers as this is more economical than losing it to the environment in open circuit systems. The recovered gas is passed through a scrubber system to remove carbon dioxide, filtered to remove odours and other impurities, and pressurised into storage containers, where it may be mixed with oxygen to the required composition. Alternatively the recycled gas can be more directly recirculated to the divers.

During extended diving operations very large amounts of breathing gas are used. Helium is an expensive gas and can be difficult to source and supply to offshore vessels in some parts of the world. A closed circuit gas reclaim system can save around 80% of gas costs by recovering about 90% of the helium based breathing mixture. Reclaim also reduces the amount of gas storage required on board, which can be important where storage capacity is limited. Reclaim systems are also used to recover gas discharged from the saturation system during decompression.

===== Demand supplied =====
A demand supplied reclaim system will typically consist of the following components:

Topside components:

- A reclaim control console, which controls and monitors the booster pump, oxygen addition, diver supply pressure, exhaust hose pressure and make-up gas addition.
- A gas reprocessing unit, with low-pressure carbon dioxide scrubber towers, filters, receivers, and back-pressure regulator which will remove carbon dioxide and excess moisture in a condensation water trap. Other gases and odours can be removed by activated carbon filters.
- A gas booster, to boost the pressure of the reclaimed gas to the storage pressure.
- A gas volume tank
- A storage system of pressure vessels to hold the boosted and reconstituted gas mixture until it is used. This functions as a buffer to allow for the variations of gas volume in the rest of the system due to pressure changes.
- Dive control panel
- A bell gas supply panel, to control the supply of gas to the bell.

Underwater components:

- The bell umbilical, with the supply and exhaust hoses between the topside system and the bell.
- Internal bell gas panel to supply the gas to the divers, and bell reclaim equipment, which controls the exhaust hose back-pressure, and can shut off the reclaim hose if the diver's gas supply is interrupted. A scrubber for the bell atmosphere and water trap would be included.
- Diver excursion umbilicals, with supply and exhaust hoses between the bell and the divers
- Reclaim helmets which supply gas to the divers on demand, with reclaim back-pressure regulators which exhaust the exhaled gas to the return line.
- Bell back-pressure regulator with water trap

In operation the gas supply from the reclaim system is connected to the topside gas panel, with a backup supply at a slightly lower pressure from mixed gas storage which will automatically cut in if the reclaim supply pressure drops. The bellman will set onboard gas supply to a slightly lower pressure than surface supply pressure to the bell gas panel, so that it will automatically cut in if surface supply is lost. After locking out of the bell the diver will close the diverter valve and open the return valve on the helmet, to start the gas reclaim process. Once this is running, the reclaim control panel will be adjusted to make up the metabolic oxygen usage of the diver into the returned gas. This system will automatically shut down oxygen addition if the flow of exhaled gas from the diver fails, to avoid an excessive oxygen fraction in the recycled gas. There is an indicator light to show whether the return gas is flowing.

The gas supplied to the diver's helmet passes through the same hoses and demand valve as for the open circuit system, but the exhaled gas passes out into the reclaim valve at slightly above ambient pressure, which is considerably above atmospheric pressure, so the flow must be controlled to prevent dropping the helmet internal pressure and causing the demand valve to free-flow. This is achieved by using back-pressure regulators to control the pressure drop in stages. The reclaim valve itself is a demand triggered back-pressure regulator, and there is another back-pressure regulator at the bell gas panel, and one at the surface before the receiver tanks. Each of these back-pressure regulators is set to allow about a 1 bar pressure drop.

Exhaust gas returns to the bell through the diver's umbilical exhaust hose, where it passes through a water separator and trap then through a back-pressure regulator which controls the pressure in the exhaust hose and which can be monitored on a pressure gauge in the bell and adjusted by the bellman to suit the excursion depth of the diver. The gas then passes through the bell umbilical exhaust hose to the surface via a non-return valve and another water trap. When the gas enters the surface unit it goes through a coalescing water separator and micron particle filter, and a float valve, which protects the reclaim system from large volumes of water in the event of a leak at depth. Another back-pressure regulator at the surface controls the pressure in the bell umbilical. The gas then passes into the receiver tanks, where oxygen is added at a flow rate calculated to compensate for metabolic use by the diver.

Before entering the boosters, the gas passes through a 0.1 micron filter. The gas is then boosted to storage pressure. Redundant boosters are provided to keep the system running while a booster is serviced. The boosters are automatically controlled to match the diver's gas consumption, and the boosted gas passes through a scrubber where the carbon dioxide is removed by a material like sodalime. Like the boosters, there are at least two scrubbers in parallel, so that they can be isolated, vented and repacked alternately while the system remains in operation. The gas then passes through a cooling heat exchanger to condense out any remaining moisture, which is removed by another 1 micon coalescing filter before it reaches the volume storage tank, where it remains until returned to the gas panel to be used by the divers. While in the volume tank, the gas can be analysed to ensure that it is suitable for re-use, and that the oxygen fraction is correct and carbon dioxide has been removed to specification before it is delivered to the divers. If necessary any lost gas can be compensated by topping up the volume tank from the high pressure storage. Gas from the volume tank is fed to the topside gas panel to be routed back to the bell and diver.

===== Free-flow push-pull =====
In a free-flow push-pull system, the gas is circulated from the bell or habitat atmosphere to the diver through the umbilical under slightly raised pressure provided by a pump (push), flow into the helmet is controlled by a regulator valve set to ambient pressure at a flow rate greater than peak inhalation flow, passes through the helmet, and part of it is breathed by the diver. A back-pressure regulator controls return flow to the bell or habitat, driven by a suction pump (pull). Flow is continuous, and work of breathing is virtually unaffected by the gas delivery system.

=== Hot water system ===
Divers working in cold water, particularly when breathing helium-based gases (which increase the rate of heat transfer), may rapidly lose body heat and suffer from hypothermia. Hypothermia is uncomfortable, unhealthy, can be life-threatening, and reduces diver effectiveness. This can be ameliorated with a hot water system. A diver hot water system heats filtered seawater and pumps it to the divers through the bell and diver umbilicals. This water can also be used to heat the breathing gas before it is inhaled. The divers' breathing gas is mainly heated on dives below 150 metres, and the ambient water temperature, depth, and hot water flow rate will determine the temperature to which the water is heated to so that it will then keep the diver warm when it flows through the diver's hot water suit.

=== Emergency heating of the bell ===
There is a need for emergency heating of divers trapped in a closed diving bell. The breathing gas may be helium based, at a high pressure, and the ambient water temperature may be quite low, down to 2 °C, with a typical temperature in the North Sea of about 5 °C. The bell itself is usually made of steel, a good thermal conductor, and the quality of bell insulation is variable, so the internal atmosphere tends to match the water temperature fairly soon after the primary heating fails. Divers trapped in bells for long periods have been subjected to various degrees of hypothermia when the primary heating systems failed. There have been deaths attributed to this cause.

Passive systems were the first to be developed to a stage where they were considered functionally sufficient, and are relatively simple, economical and immediately available, and are used as standard equipment when applicable. Personal insulation for the diver, in the form of an insulated bag, combined with a breathing gas heat exchanger to conserve the heat of exhaled gas, and heat liberated by a personal carbon dioxide scrubber kept within the insulation layer round the diver is usually sufficient to keep the divers in thermal balance while waiting for rescue. The scrubber has an orinasal mask, and the bag is secured to the inside of the bell by a harness, to prevent the diver from collapsing if rendered unconscious, and potentially blocking access to the bell by rescuers. (Note: Underwater access to a diving bell is through an inward opening circular pressure hatch at the bottom. The domed ends of the bell provide very little flat area around the hatch, and anything that is big enough and not secured will tend to slide over the hatch and obstruct the opening.)

=== Communication systems ===
Helium and high pressure both cause hyperbaric distortion of speech. The process of talking underwater is influenced by the internal geometry of the life support equipment and constraints on the communications systems as well as the physical and physiological influences of the environment on the processes of speaking and vocal sound production. The use of breathing gases under pressure or containing helium causes problems in intelligibility of diver speech due to distortion caused by the different speed of sound in the gas and the different density of the gas compared to air at surface pressure. These parameters induce changes in the vocal tract formants, which affect the timbre, and a slight change of pitch. Several studies indicate that the loss in intelligibility is mainly due to the change in the formants.

The difference in density of the breathing gas causes a non-linear shift of low-pitch vocal resonance, due to resonance shifts in the vocal cavities, giving a nasal effect, and a linear shift of vocal resonances which is a function of the velocity of sound in the gas, known as the Donald Duck effect. Another effect of higher density is the relative increase in intensity of voiced sounds relative to unvoiced sounds. The contrast between closed and open voiced sounds and the contrast between voiced consonants and adjacent vowels decrease with increased pressure. Change of the speed of sound is relatively large in relation to depth increase at shallower depths, but this effect reduces as the pressure increases, and at greater depths a change in depth makes a smaller difference. Helium speech unscramblers are a partial technical solution. They improve intelligibility of transmitted speech to surface personnel.

The communications system may have four component systems.

- The hardwired intercom system, an amplified voice system with speech unscrambler to reduce the pitch of the speech of the occupants of the pressurized system. This system will provide communications between the main control console and the bell and accommodation chambers. This two-way system is the primary communications mode.
- Wireless through-water communications between bell and main control console is a backup system in case of failure of the hardwired system with the bell.
- Closed circuit video from cameras on the bell and diver helmets allow visual monitoring of the dive and the divers by the supervisor.
- A sound powered phone system may be provided as a backup voice communication system between bell and control console.

=== Sanitation system ===
The sanitation system includes hot and cold water supply for washbasins and showers, drainage, and marine toilets with holding tank and discharge system. Clean hot and cold fresh water is supplied either from a holding tank/accumulator at higher pressure than the habitat pressure or directly from a booster pump. The water is fed into the chamber where it is used through a hull penetration with a quarter-turn shut off valve on the outside and a non-return valve on the inside.

The usual site for the sanitation system is in the transfer chamber, but there are systems where each living chamber has an attached sanitation chamber.

Toilets have a valve interlock system to ensure that the discharge cannot be operated while in use. After use a LST will open the external drain valve. The internal drain valve is opened to depressurise the holding tank then closed and the toilet drain valve opened while the contents are drained into the holding tank, then closed. The holding tank interior drain valve is opened again to discharge the contents to the exterior drain pipe. then closed again and finally the external valve is closed.

=== Control consoles ===
It is common for the control room of a modular system to be installed in an ISO intermodal container for convenience of transport. There are three main control panels, for life support, dive control and gas management.

==== Gas management panel ====
The gas management panel includes pressure regulation of gases from high pressure storage, and distribution to the consumers. Gases will include air, oxygen and heliox mixes

==== Saturation life support panel ====
The chamber control panel will typically include pressure gauges for each compartment, including trunking, blowdown and exhaust valves, oxygen monitoring and other gas analysis equipment, make-up system for oxygen replenishment, valves for supplying therapeutic breathing mixture, closed circuit television monitoring displays, and monitoring systems with alarms for temperature and pressure in the system chambers. Pressures of compartments are usually expresses as metres of feet of seawater.

==== Dive control panel ====
The dive control panel will include depth gauges for bell internal and external pressure, diver and bellman depth, and trunking pressure for transfer to the accommodation chambers. There will also be breathing gas pressure gauges and control valves for each diver, and blowdown and exhaust valves for the bell interior, diver communications systems with speech unscramblers, a through-water emergency communications system to the bell, controls, monitors and recording equipment for helmet and bell mounted video cameras, oxygen analysers for diver breathing gas, oxygen and carbon dioxide analysers for bell and reclaim gas, alarms for reclaim gas flow, dynamic positioning and hot water supply.

=== Fire suppression system ===
Firefighting systems include hand held fire extinguishers to automatic deluge sprinkler systems. Special fire extinguishers which do not use toxic materials and which will discharge adequately under pressure must be used. In the event of a fire, toxic gases may be released by burning materials, and the occupants will have to use the built-in breathing systems (BIBS) until the chamber gas has been flushed sufficiently. As far as possible, the contents of a saturation system, including firefighting materials, should minimise the production of highly toxic combustion products. When a system with oxygen partial pressure 0.48 bar is pressurized to more than about 70 msw (231 fsw), the oxygen fraction is too low to support combustion (less than 6%), and the fire risk is low. During the early stages of compression and towards the end of decompression the oxygen levels will support combustion, and greater care must be taken. The saturation system support team will be provided with firefighting breathing apparatus allowing them to work in smoke and toxic fumes.

=== Hyperbaric rescue and escape systems ===
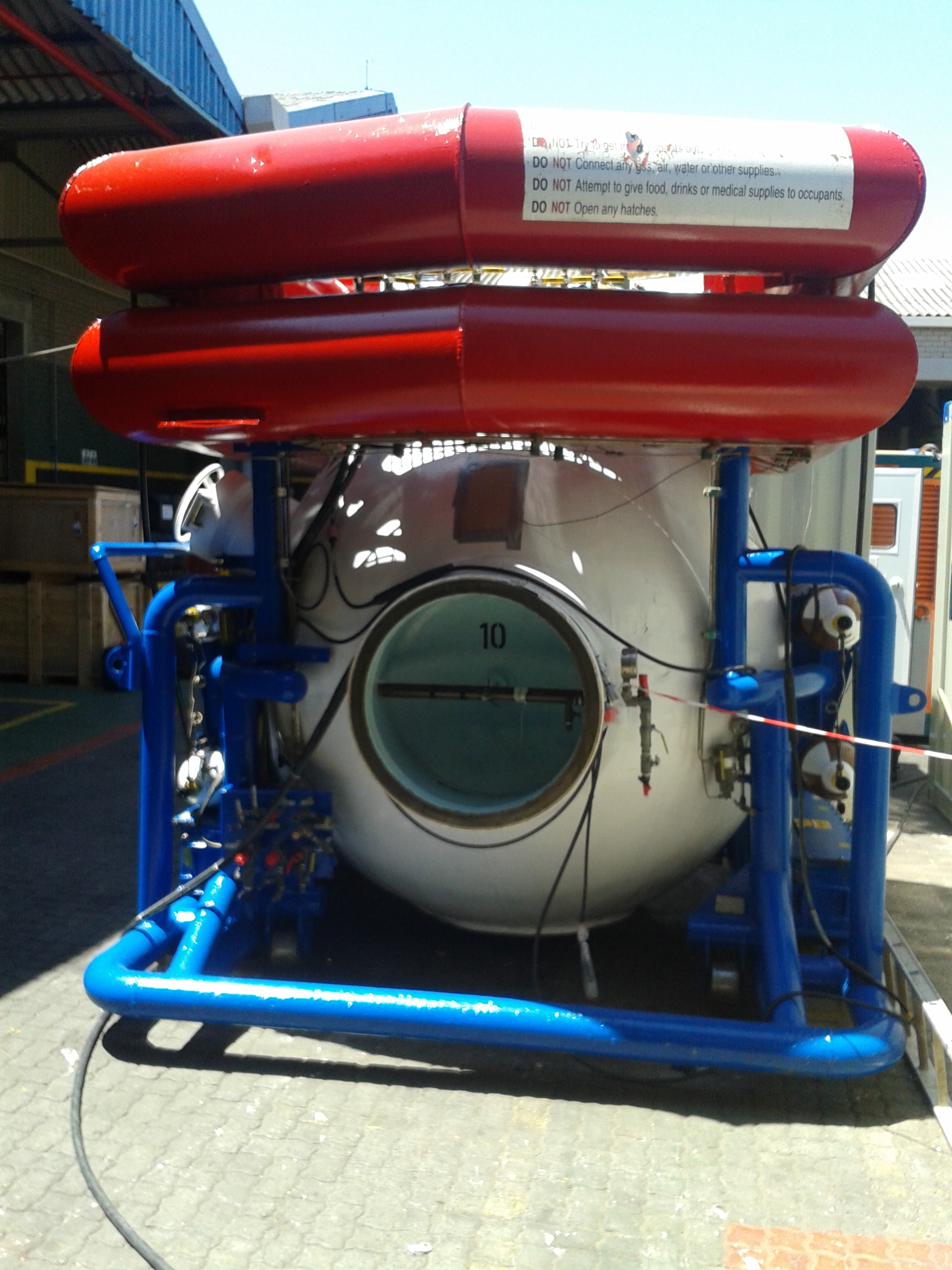
Hyperbaric escape module

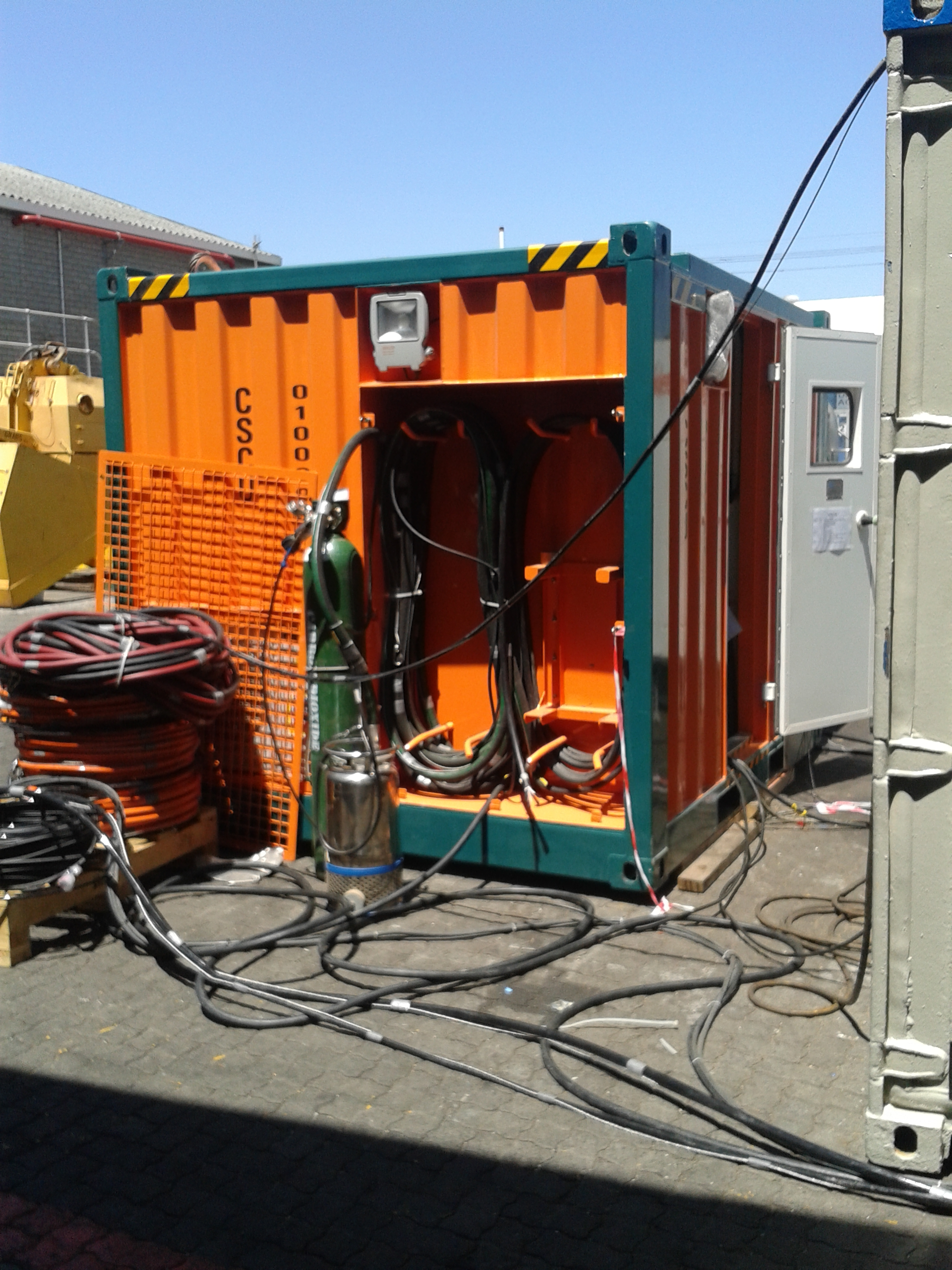
Hyperbaric escape module launch control room

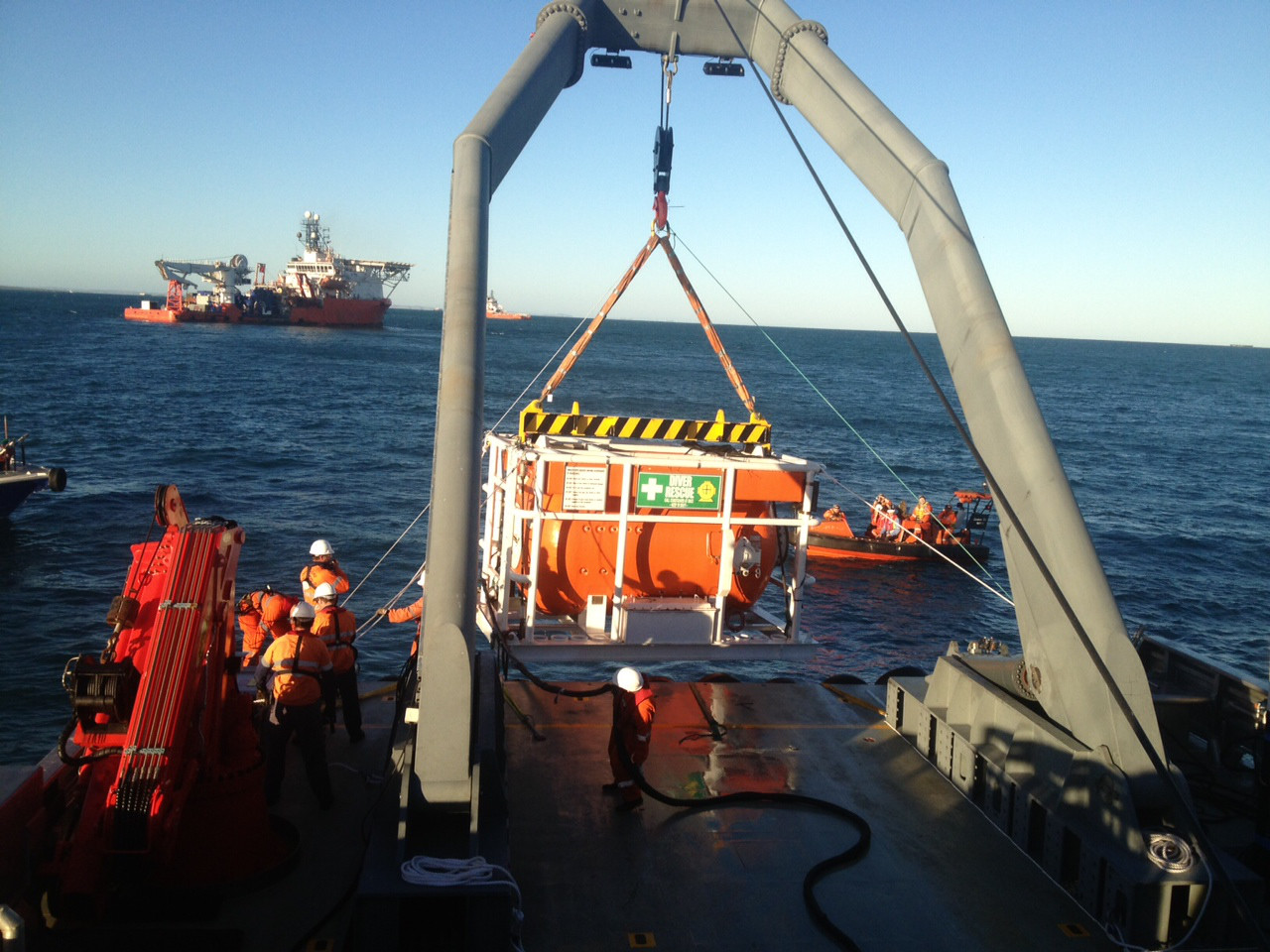
Hyperbaric rescue chamber recovery drill

A saturated diver who needs to be evacuated in an emergency should preferably be transported without a significant change in their environmental pressure. Hyperbaric evacuation requires pressurised transportation equipment, and could be required in a range of situations:

- The support vessel at risk of capsize or sinking.
- Unacceptable fire or explosion hazard.
- Failure of the hyperbaric life support system.
- A medical problem which cannot be dealt with on site.
- A "lost" bell (a bell which has been broken free of lifting cables and umbilical; the actual position of the bell is usually still known with considerable accuracy).

A hyperbaric lifeboat or rescue chamber may be provided for emergency evacuation of saturation divers from a saturation system. This would be used if the platform is at immediate risk due to fire or sinking, and allows the divers under saturation to get clear of the immediate danger. A hyperbaric lifeboat is self-contained and can be operated by a surface pressure crew while the chamber occupants are under pressure. It must be self-sufficient for several days at sea, in case of a delay in rescue due to sea conditions. It is possible to start decompression after launching if the occupants are medically stable, but seasickness and dehydration may delay the decompression until the module has been recovered.

The rescue chamber or hyperbaric lifeboat will generally be recovered for completion of decompression due to the limited onboard life support and facilities. The recovery plan will include a standby vessel to perform the recovery.

The International Maritime Organization (IMO) and International Marine Contractors Association IMCA recognise that though the number of hyperbaric evacuations which have been successfully carried out is small, and the likelihood of an incident needing hyperbaric evacuation is extremely low, the risk is sufficient to justify requiring the equipment to be available. The original meaning for the term hyperbaric evacuation system covered the system that actually transported the divers away from the working hyperbaric system such as a hyperbaric rescue chamber, a self-propelled hyperbaric lifeboat, or hyperbaric rescue vessel, all of which float and carry short term life-support systems of varied endurance, but it has more recently come to include all of the equipment that would support a hyperbaric evacuation, such as a life support package that can be connected to a recovered hyperbaric rescue unit, to provide interim life support until decompression facilities are available, and the hyperbaric reception facility where divers can be decompressed and treated in relative comfort. The four main classes of problem that must be managed during a hyperbaric evacuation are thermal balance, motion sickness, dealing with metabolic waste products, and severely cramped and confined conditions.

Bell to bell transfer may be used to rescue divers from a lost or entrapped bell. This will generally occur at or near the bottom, and the divers transfer between bells at ambient water pressure. It is possible in some circumstances to use a bell as a rescue chamber to transport divers from one saturation system to another. This may require temporary modifications to the bell, and is only possible if the mating flanges of the systems are compatible.

== Personnel requirements ==
The operation of a saturation system is the work of a team of life support technicians, who are part of the diving team associated with the diving operation. There is also work for diving systems technicians to install and maintain the equipment.

=== Life support system operation ===
A person who operates a saturation diving system is called a life support technician (LST). The life support system is operated by the life-support technicians under the life-support supervisor, who are part of the saturation diving team. There will be at least two life support technicians working shifts, as one must be on duty at all times while there are divers under pressure.

The pressure, oxygen and carbon dioxide content of the breathing gas, and temperature and humidity of the environment are monitored and controlled. Sewage disposal from the habitat, and locking food, stores and equipment into and out of the chambers are also controlled from outside by life support personnel. The LST is also responsible for communication with the divers in saturation, managing transfer of personnel into and out of the accommodation chambers, maintaining the hyperbaric rescue craft and hyperbaric evacuation of the divers in an emergency.

== Platforms ==
Most saturation diving is done offshore, in the vicinity of drilling and production platforms, or for salvage work, and requires precise positioning of the bell during the dive. In deep water this is usually done from a specialised diving support vessel, or a suitable vessel of opportunity on which a saturation system has been temporarily installed. Positioning can either be by a substantial anchor pattern, which may interfere with other anchoring spreads already established, and which presents its own set of hazards, or by dynamic positioning, which must be sufficiently reliable and fail-safe for the expected conditions. Heave compensation gear may be used to limit vertical movement when the bell is in the water and clear of the bell cursor, particularly at working depth when the diver may be locked out and the bell is open to ambient pressure.

== Underwater habitats ==
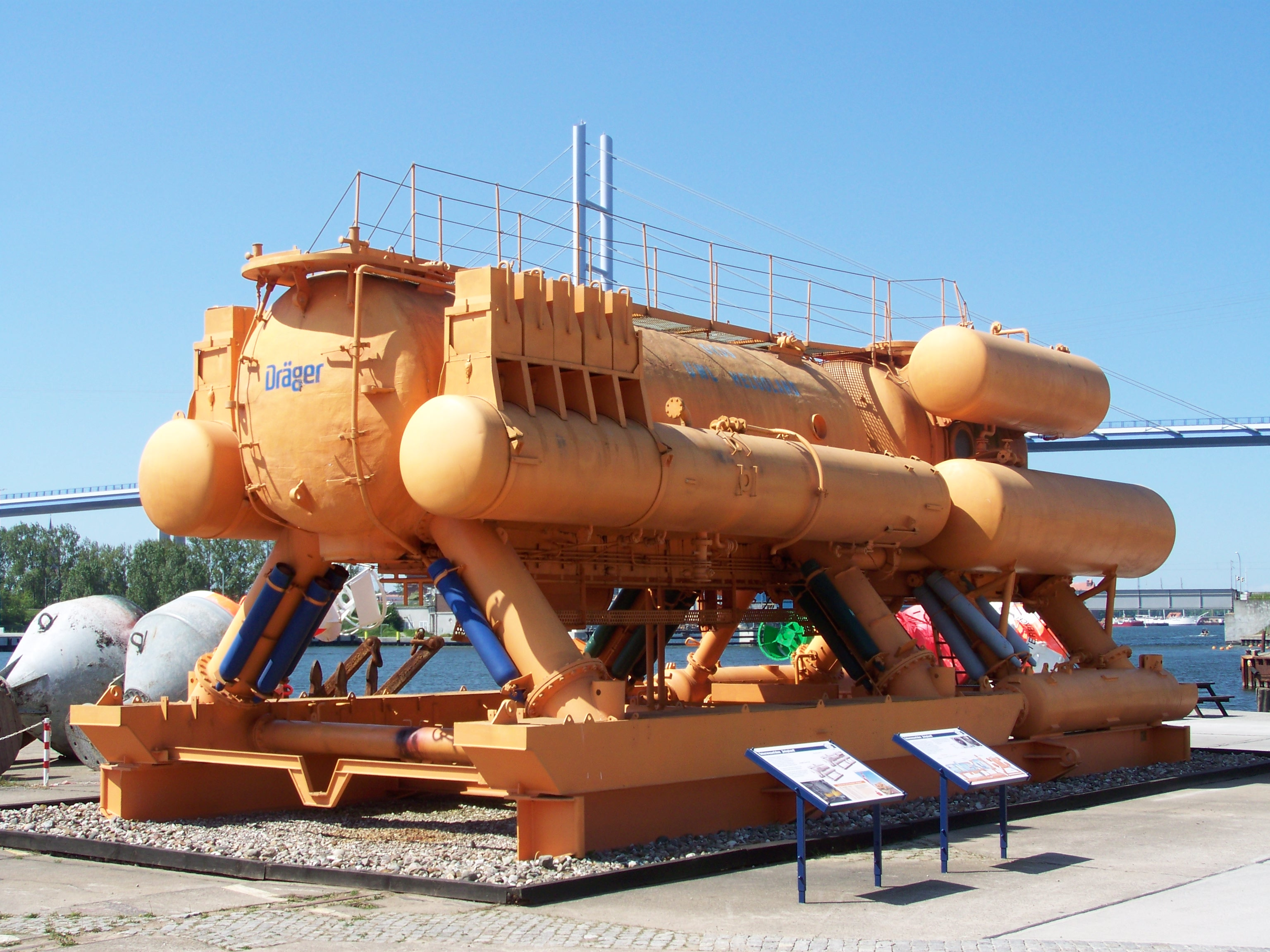
The German saturation habitat Helgoland

Scientific saturation diving is usually conducted by researchers and technicians known as aquanauts living in an underwater habitat, a structure designed for people to live in for extended periods, where they can carry out almost all basic human functions: working, resting, eating, attending to personal hygiene, and sleeping, all while remaining under pressure beneath the surface.

An underwater habitat has to meet the needs of human physiology and provide suitable environmental conditions, and the one which is most critical is breathing gas of suitable quality. Others concern the physical environment (pressure, temperature, light, humidity), the chemical environment (drinking water, food, waste products, toxins) and the biological environment (hazardous sea creatures, microorganisms, marine fungi). Much of the science covering underwater habitats and their technology designed to meet human requirements is shared with diving, diving bells, surface saturation systems, submersible vehicles, submarines, and spacecraft.

Numerous ambient pressure underwater habitats have been designed, built and used around the world since the early 1960s, either by private individuals, research institutions, or by government agencies. They have been used almost exclusively for research and exploration. Research has been devoted particularly to the physiological processes and limits of breathing gases under pressure, for aquanaut and astronaut training, as well as for research on marine ecosystems. Access to and from the exterior is generally vertically through a hole in the bottom of the structure called a moon pool or wet porch. The habitat may include a decompression chamber, or personnel transfer to the surface may be via a closed diving bell.

== Systems hazards and risk ==
Risk analysis and management is necessary for acceptably safe saturation diving, and reasonable confidence that the goals of the operation can be achieved and schedules maintained. There are various possible responses to identified risks:

- A high risk system may be replaced.
- Possible failure of a system may be accepted, leaving the residual risk. In some cases this is the only option where there is no suitable response plan in place, and the reserve capacity is acceptable.
- Action may be taken to reduce the risk of failure of the system to an acceptable level.
- Liability for the risk may be transferred to another party, who is then responsible for precautionary measures.
- Monitoring systems may be established which will give sufficient warning of system status that corrective action can be taken in time to avoid failure or allow safe failure.

Some hazards of saturation systems which can result in unacceptable consequences, and are therefore considered high risk if not corrected within a short time:

- Loss of control of oxygen content of the hyperbaric chamber atmosphere or diver breathing gas. These problems can lead to oxygen toxicity or hypoxia, but due to the large volumes of gas in the chambers, will develop slowly, and provided that the monitoring equipment is functional can be manually corrected without great difficulty. Chamber BIBS can be used to provide appropriate breathing gas in an emergency.
- Loss of control of the carbon dioxide content of chamber atmosphere or diver breathing gas. In this type of failure there is an upper tolerable short term limit for carbon dioxide content which is significantly higher than the normal chamber level. It too will take some time to develop a high level, and there are redundant scrubbers which can be used when necessary.
- Contamination of chamber atmosphere or breating gas.
- Loss of control of the temperature of the dry hyperbaric environment or of the diver in the water.
- Loss of control over chamber humidity.
- Loss of control over chamber pressure is considered the hazard with the greatest risk to saturation divers.
- Fire in or around the hyperbaric habitat and support services. After loss of pressure, fire is considered the highest risk hazard to saturation divers. Several hazards which exist independently of fire hazard also exist as complications of fire hazars, such as contamination of chamber gas, loss of control of chamber temperature, and loss of control over chamber pressure. A range of increased fire risk is recognised for oxygen fraction of the chamber atmosphere greater than 6%, which corresponds to pressures less than 70 msw for the usual oxygen partial pressures of living spaces. An upper limit of 23% is imposed when decompession is approaching normal atmospheric pressure.
- Circumstances requiring emergency decompression or hyperbaric evacuation.
- Loss of adequate reserve of breathing gas.
- Loss of required quality of breathing gas
- Loss of correct distribution of pressure within the saturarion spaces.
- Failure to maintain the planned decompression profile.

The ideal of quantitative risk assessment requires availability of statistics on the probability of occurrence of specific events. Accumulation of such data requires experience with the system, or sufficiently similar systems, components, and service conditions that an analysis can be meaningful. There may be complex interactions of relevant factors, and these may not always be recognised, and some hazards also may not be recognised.

Qualitative risk assessment generally falls short when a comparison of risk in different scenarios is desired. Risk assessment also does not always suggest appropriate responses to failure, and tends to have a subjective component due to the varied experience of assessors.

== Standards and classification ==
Design, manufacture, testing and maintenance may be required to comply with national occupational safety and health regulations for inshore work and IMCA requirements or the equivalent for offshore work. Saturation systems are generally designed, manufactured, and classified to the standards of a recognised classification society like Lloyd's Register, Bureau Veritas, American Bureau of Shipping or Det Norske Veritas for quality assurance. Relevant standards and guidance include:

- IMCA D 024: DESIGN for saturation (bell) diving systems provides guidance on the inspection, testing, and certification of saturation diving systems.
- IMCA D 052: Guidance on Hyperbaric Evacuation Systems.
- IMCA D 053: DESIGN for the Hyperbaric Reception Facility (HRF) forming part of a Hyperbaric Evacuation System (HES).

== See also ==
Regulatory and advisory bodies, registration authorities:

- International Marine Contractors Association (IMCA) – International trade association for the marine contracting industry
- United States Navy Experimental Diving Unit (NEDU) – US military research and development unit

Manufacturers of saturation diving equipment:

- James Fisher & Sons – British shipowner and provider of marine engineering services
- Kirby Morgan – Brand of underwater diving equipment
- Diving helmet#Manufacturers

Alternative technology:

- Surface oriented diving – Underwater diving in which the diver starts and finishes at surface pressure
  - Bell bounce diving – Surface oriented diving using a closed bell
  - Transfer under pressure diving (TUP diving) – Surface oriented diving from a closed bell and a chamber for decompression
- Atmospheric diving suit – Articulated pressure-resistant anthropomorphic housing for an underwater diver
- Lock-out submersible – Submersible with an airlock and diving chamber from which divers can be deployed
- Remotely operated underwater vehicle – Tethered underwater mobile device operated by a remote crew
