= HMS Cerberus =

Five ships of the Royal Navy have been named HMS Cerberus or Cerbere after Cerberus, the three-headed dog in Greek mythology that guards Hades:

- HMS Cerberus (1758) was a 28-gun sixth-rate frigate launched in 1758 and burnt in 1778.
- HMS Cerberus (1779) was a 32-gun fifth-rate frigate launched in 1779 and wrecked attempting to exit Castle Harbour, Bermuda, via Castle Roads in 1783.
- HMS Cerberus (1794) was a 32-gun fifth-rate frigate launched in 1794 and sold in 1814 after service in the French Revolutionary and Napoleonic Wars.
- HMS Cerbere (1800) was a 7-gun gun-brig that HMS Viper captured from the French in 1800. She was wrecked in 1804.
- HMS Cerberus (1827) was a 46-gun fifth-rate frigate launched in 1827 and broken up by 1866.

== See also ==
- HMAS Cerberus, the name of several Australian naval bases and ships
- HMVS Cerberus was a breastwork monitor launched in 1868. She converted into a depot ship in 1918 and was renamed Platypus II. She was sunk as a breakwater in 1926.
- HNLMS Cerberus, the name of several ships of the Royal Netherlands Navy
