= Longma-class dive tender =

Chinese diving support vessel class

History

PRC
- Status: Active

General characteristics
- Class & type: Longma
- Type: Dive tender (YDT)
- Propulsion: Marine diesel
- Sensors & processing systems: Navigation radar

The Longma class is a class of little known diving support vessel (YDT) built in the People's Republic of China (PRC) for the People's Liberation Army Navy (PLAN). The exact domestic Chinese type designation remains unknown, and this class is identified by its NATO reporting name Longma class, or 龙马 in Chinese, meaning "dragon horse". As of mid 2010s, a total of four ships have been identified, and one of them Nan-Jiu (南救) 509 has been retired at the end of 2018.

The Longma class in PLAN service are designated by a combination of two Chinese characters followed by a three-digit number. The second Chinese character is Jiu (救), meaning Rescue in Chinese, because these ships are classified as rescue ship. The first Chinese character denotes which fleet the ship is in service with, with East (Dong, 东) for East Sea Fleet, North (Bei, 北) for North Sea Fleet, and South (Nan, 南) for South Sea Fleet. However, the pennant numbers are subject to change due to changes of Chinese naval ships naming convention, or when units are transferred to different fleets. The inclusion of the Chinese character Rescue in its designation indicates that in addition to diving tender, this class also functions as rescue ships (ARS).

Type	NATO designation	Pennant No.	Name (English)	Name (Han 中文)	Commissioned	Displacement	Fleet	Status
Longma-class dive tender (YDT) / rescue ship (ARS)	Longma class	Bei-Jiu 141	North Rescue 141	北救 141	?	? t	North Sea Fleet	Active
Longma-class dive tender (YDT) / rescue ship (ARS)	Longma class	Bei-Jiu 142	North Rescue 142	北救 142	?	? t	North Sea Fleet	Active
Longma-class dive tender (YDT) / rescue ship (ARS)	Longma class	Nan-Jiu 507	South Rescue 507	南救 507	?	? t	South Sea Fleet	Active
Longma-class dive tender (YDT) / rescue ship (ARS)	Longma class	Nan-Jiu 509	South Rescue 509	南救 509	?	? t	South Sea Fleet	Retired
