= HNLMS Cerberus =

HNLMS Cerberus (Dutch: Hr.Ms. or Zr.Ms. Cerberus) may refer to the following ships of the Royal Netherlands Navy that have been named after the mythical creature Cerberus:

- HNLMS Cerberus (1869), was a Heiligerlee-class monitor
- HNLMS Cerberus (A895), was a net laying ship (later diving support vessel). Now in service with the Turkish Navy as TCG Ağ-6
- HNLMS Cerberus (A851), is the lead ship of the Cerberus-class diving support vessels
