= TCG Ağ-6 =

Water vessel

TCG Ağ-6 (P-306)
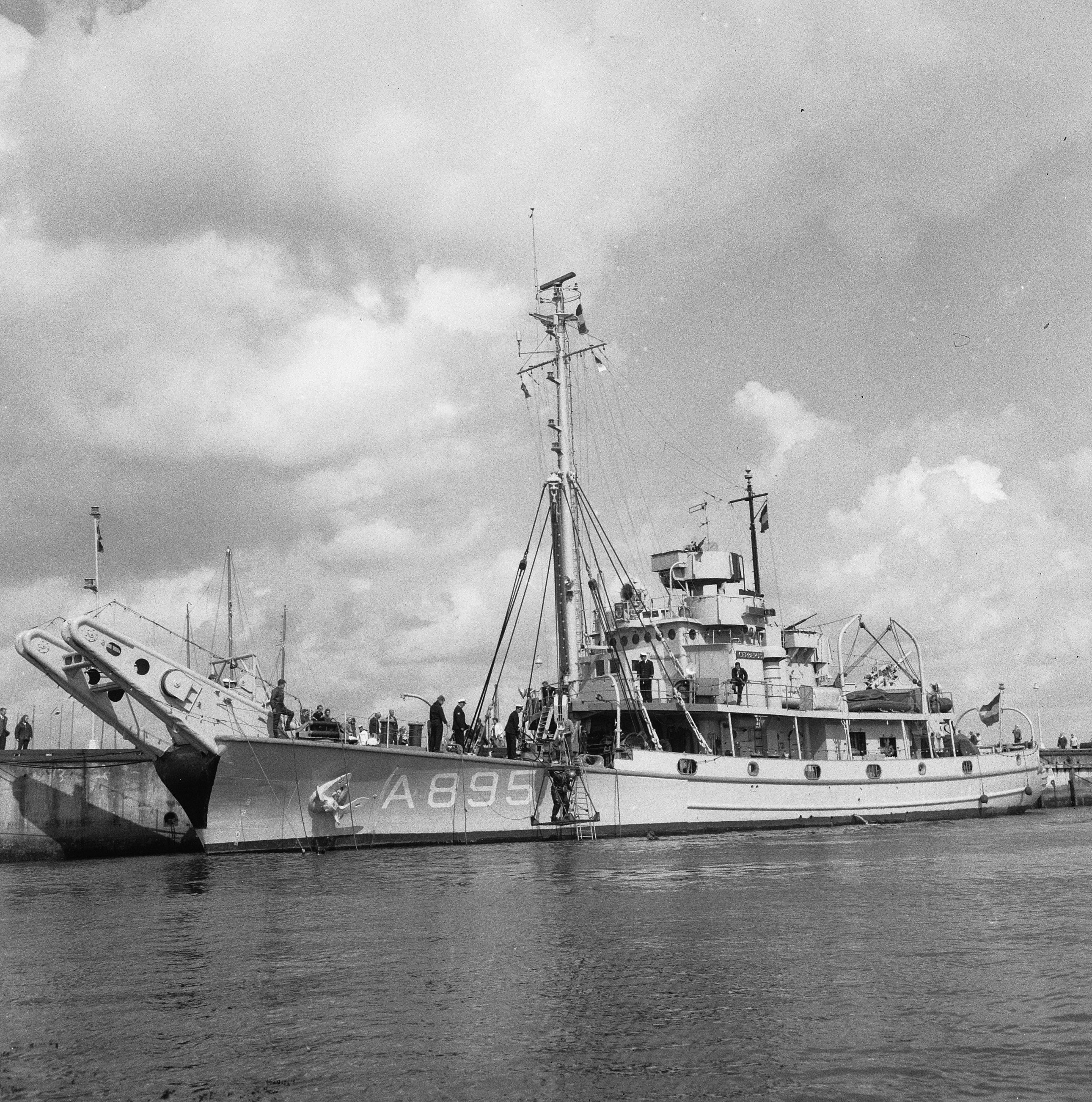
- HNLMS Cerberus in Den Helder during the 1966 Navy days

Class overview
- Name: AN 93 class
- Operators: Royal Netherlands Navy (former); Turkish Navy
- Succeeded by: Netherlands: Triton class
- In commission: 1952–present

History

United States
- Name: AN 93
- Builder: Bethlehem Steel Co., Staten Island
- Launched: May 1952
- Fate: Handed over to the Royal Netherlands Navy

Netherlands
- Name: Cerberus
- Acquired: May 1990
- Commissioned: 10 November 1952
- Decommissioned: 28 February 1967
- Out of service: 3 November 1969
- Reclassified: 8 September 1961 (as diving support vessel)
- Identification: Pennant number: A895
- Status: Returned to the US in 1970

Turkey
- Name: Ağ-6
- Commissioned: 17 September 1970
- Identification: Pennant number: P306
- Status: In active service

General characteristics
- Type: Net laying ship (later: diving support vessel)
- Displacement: 960 t (945 long tons) full load
- Length: 52.16 m (171 ft 2 in)
- Beam: 10.40 m (34 ft 1 in)
- Draught: 3.87 m (12 ft 8 in)
- Propulsion: 2 × 1,550 hp (1,160 kW) General Motors diesel engines
- Speed: 12.8 knots (23.7 km/h; 14.7 mph)
- Complement: 51
- Armament: 1 × 7.6 cm (3.0 in) canon; 4 × 20 mm (0.79 in) machine gun

TCG Ağ-6 (P-306) (ex-HNLMS Cerberus (A895)) was a net laying ship of the Royal Netherlands Navy. Currently serving in the Turkish Navy.

== History ==
The ship was built under the Mutual Defense Assistance Program (MDAP) for the Dutch Navy to a similar design as the Cohoes class. She was the first warship built by the United States to be handed over to a NATO member without serving for the US first.

In 1961 the Cerberus was rebuilt as a diving support vessel, but could still function as a net layer.

On paper she was returned to the United States on 17 September 1970. But the US transferred her to the Turkish Navy on the same day.
