= Triton-class diving support vessel =

Ship design project of the Royal Netherlands Navy

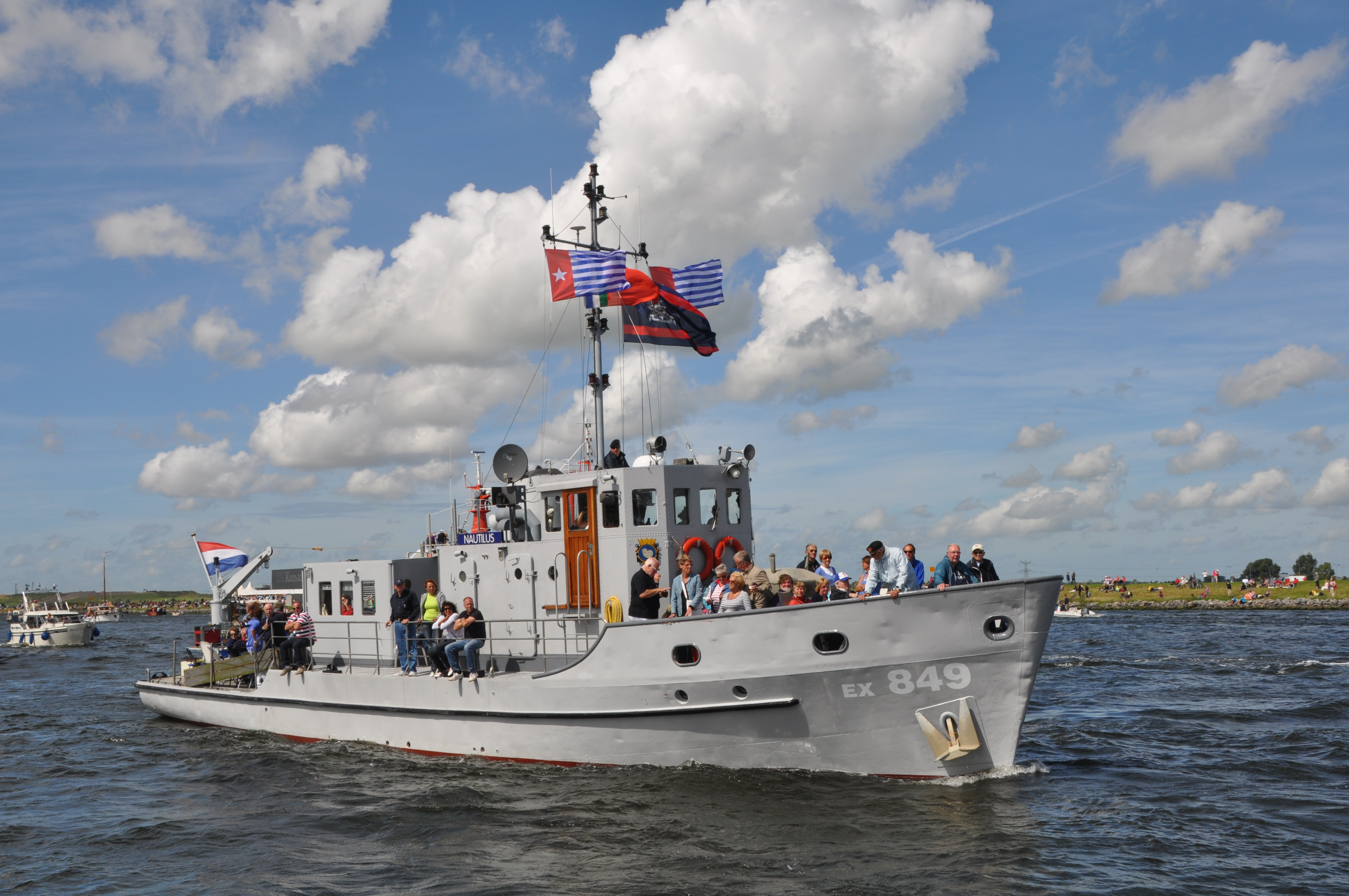
- Nautilus during SAIL Amsterdam 2010

Class overview
- Name: Triton class
- Builders: Rijkswerf Willemsoord
- Operators: Royal Netherlands Navy
- Preceded by: HNLMS Cerberus (A895)
- Succeeded by: Cerberus class
- Built: 1964–1965
- In commission: 1964–1992
- Planned: 3
- Completed: 3
- Retired: 3
- Preserved: 2

General characteristics
- Type: Diving support vessel
- Tonnage: 74.50 GT
- Length: 23.28 m (76 ft 5 in)
- Beam: 5.14 m (16 ft 10 in)
- Draught: 1.34 m (4 ft 5 in)
- Propulsion: 1 × 105 hp (78 kW) Volvo Penta diesel engine
- Speed: 9 knots (17 km/h; 10 mph) (maximum)
- Crew: 8

The Triton class are a class of diving support vessels were used by the Royal Netherlands Navy.

== Ships in class ==
Hull number	Name	Builder	Laid down	Launched	Commissioned	Decommissioned	Fate	Notes
Y 8125 / A 848	Triton	Rijkswerf Willemsoord, Den Helder	3 February 1964	27 February 1964	5 August 1964	20 November 1992	Preserved in Lauwersoog	
Y 8126 / A 849	Nautilus	Rijkswerf Willemsoord, Den Helder	17 March 1964	1 May 1964	20 April 1965	2 June 1992	Preserved in Zaandam	
Y 8127 / A 850	Hydra	Rijkswerf Willemsoord, Den Helder	21 May 1964	1 July 1964	20 April 1965	20 November 1992	Preserved in Panheel	
