= Kerberos =

Kerberos is alternative spelling of Cerberus. It may also refer to:

== Science and technology ==
- Kerberos (protocol), a computer network authentication protocol
- Kerberos (moon), a moon of Pluto
- Kerberos (mammal), an extinct genus of carnivorous mammal

== Arts and entertainment ==
- Kerberos (magazine), a discontinued Swedish-language satirical magazine in Finland
- Keroberos or Cerberus, a character from Cardcaptor Sakura
- Kerberos Saga, a science fiction media franchise by Mamoru Oshii
- Kerberos Dante, a character from Saint Seiya
- Kerberos, the name of a ship in the Netflix series 1899
- Kerberos and Kerberos II, two of the Undeads in Kamen Rider Blade

== Other uses ==
- Kerberos (mythology), multiple figures from Greek mythology
- Kerberos Productions, a game development studio

== See also ==
- Cerberus (disambiguation)
