= HNLMS Triton (A828) =

History

Japan
- Name: Matsunura Maru (also spelled Matsanoura Maru)
- Builder: Harima Dockyard & Shipbuilding Co., Kure, Japan
- In service: October 1941
- Fate: transferred to the Netherlands as war trophy in September 1946

Netherlands
- Name: Triton
- Acquired: September 1946
- In service: 3 May 1948
- Identification: A 828
- Fate: transferred to Indonesia in 1953

Indonesia
- Acquired: 1953
- Identification: 926

General characteristics
- Type: Salvage ship; Tugboat
- Displacement: 1,040 t (1,020 long tons)
- Length: 55.7 m (182 ft 9 in)
- Beam: 9.14 m (30 ft 0 in)
- Draught: 3.55 m (11 ft 8 in)
- Propulsion: 2 propellers; 1 boiler; triple expansion engine
- Speed: 6.5 knots (12.0 km/h; 7.5 mph)
- Armament: 2 x 20 mm machine guns

HNLMS Triton was a auxiliary ship that served between 1948 and 1953 in the Royal Netherlands Navy (RNLN). She was built in Japan originally for the Imperial Japanese Navy as Matsunura Maru (also spelled Matsanoura Maru). After the Second World War Matsunura Maru was transferred to the Netherlands as war trophy and renamed Triton. During her service in the RNLN she was at first used as tug and salvage ship. Later, after 1950, she was used to train divers. In 1953 Triton was transferred to Indonesia and assigned the pennant number 926.

== Design and construction ==
Triton was built at Harima Dockyard & Shipbuilding Co. in Kure, Japan. She was originally named Matsunura Maru (also spelled Matsanoura Maru) and served in the Imperial Japanese Navy as salvage ship. After being transferred to the Netherlands and entering service in the Royal Netherlands Navy (RNLN), she was also used as salvage ship and as tug. Triton had a displacement of 1,040 tons and a pulling power of at least 75 tons. When it came to measurements, she had a length of 55.7 metres (182 ft 9 in), a beam of 9.14 metres (30 ft 0 in) and a draught of 3.55 metres (11 ft 8 in).

=== Armament ===
Triton was armed with two 20 mm machine guns.

=== Propulsion ===
Triton was equipped with a single boiler and a triple expansion engine that could produce 520 kilowatts (700 hp). This allowed her two propellers to reach a maximum speed of 6.5 knots (12.0 km/h; 7.5 mph).

== Service history ==
=== As Matsunura Maru ===
Matsunura Maru entered into service of the Imperial Japanese Navy in October 1941.

At the end of the Second World War Matsunura Maru was used as evacuation ship for prisoners of war. In this role she transported people from Batavia to Japan. Eventually the ship was discovered in the waters of the Dutch East Indies by the RNLN. This led to Matsunura Maru being towed to Kali Mati at Tandjong Priok, after the Japanese crew were ordered to abandon the ship. Soon after, in September 1946, she was officially transferred to the Netherlands as war trophy and renamed Triton.

=== As Triton ===
Before entering into service of the RNLN, Triton was first overhauled at the Marine-Etablissement Soerabaja. This was necessary since the Japanese crew had sabotaged the ship before abandoning her. Eventually it took until 3 May 1948 before Triton entered into service of the RNLN.

On 19 June 1948 Triton left Tandjong Priok to journey towards Belawan to remove wrecks from the harbor. To perform this duty she towed a 75 tons floating sheerleg with her.

== Citations ==
=== Bibliography ===
- van Amstel, W.H.E. (1991). De schepen van de Koninklijke Marine vanaf 1945 (in Dutch). Alkmaar: De Alk. ISBN 90-6013-997-6.
- Meeldijk, D., ed. (1948). "Marinenieuws in 't kort". Onze Vloot (in Dutch). Vol. 4, no. 8. Rotterdam: Wyt. pp. 157–159.
- Steenmeyer, Daan (1948). "Met de bok op stap: Hr. Ms. bergingsvaartuig „Triton"". Onze Vloot (in Dutch). Rotterdam: Wyt. pp. 191–192.
