= Moon pool =

Opening in the base of a hull, platform, or chamber giving access to the water below

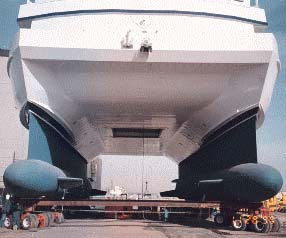
- Underside of the Research Vessel Western Flyer, showing its moon pool between the two hulls
- Other names: Wet porch, wet room, wet bell
- Uses: Protected access to the water for divers from a vessel, floating platform or underwater habitat

A moon pool or moonpool is an equipment deployment and retrieval feature used by marine drilling platforms, drillships, diving support vessels, fishing vessels, marine research vessels, underwater exploration vessels, research vessels, and underwater habitats. It is also known as a wet porch. It is an opening found in the floor or base of the hull, platform, or chamber giving access to the water below. Because of its stable location, it allows technicians or researchers to safely lower tools and instruments into the sea.

Moon pools also provide shelter and protection so that even if the ship is in high seas or surrounded by ice, researchers can work in comfort rather than on a deck exposed to the elements. A moon pool also allows divers, diving bells, ROVs, or small submersible craft to enter or leave the water easily and in a more protected environment.

Moon pools can be used in chambers below sea level, especially for the use of scuba divers, and their design requires more complex consideration of air and water pressure acting on the moon pool surface.

== Origins ==
Moon pools were first used in the oil drilling industry given the remote offshore locations of oil fields (e.g. sea or in lakes). They have been used for drilling, production, storage and offloading to smaller vessels for transportation of oil. They are also built to pass drilling equipment into the water from a platform or drillship. A moon pool supports the need for drilling pipes to run vertically through the structure or hull.

== Glomar Explorer ==
The Hughes Glomar Explorer was a 50,500 long tons (51,300 t), 618-foot-long (188 m) ship constructed by the United States in the early 1970s for the recovery of a sunken Soviet submarine from the Pacific seabed. The design of the ship was broadly inspired by oil drilling ships and included a moon pool measuring 199 feet (61 m) long by 74 feet (23 m) wide with a vertical clearance of 65 feet (20 m), into which the submarine was to be recovered, with the bottom of the moon pool then closed off by two gates to allow the recovered vessel to be examined under cover and in dry conditions. This was a singular use of a moon pool and also possibly the largest dedicated moon pool constructed to date.

== In underwater habitats ==
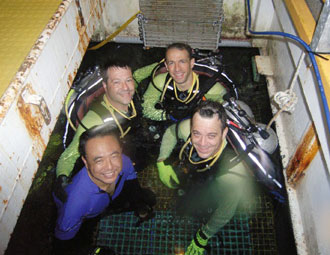
NEEMO 13 Crew in the wet porch/moon pool of the Aquarius habitat

Very deep moon pools are used in underwater habitats—submerged chambers used by divers engaged in underwater research, exploration, marine salvage, and recreation. In this case, there is no dry access between the chamber and the sea surface, and the moon pool is the only entry or exit to the chamber. Submerged chambers provide dry areas for work and rest without the need to ascend to the surface. This kind of submerged chamber uses the same principles as the diving bell, except they are fixed to the seafloor and may be called a wet porch, wet room, or wet bell. Sometimes the term moon pool is used to mean the complete chamber, not just the opening in the bottom and the air–water interface.

The alternative to a moon pool in an underwater habitat is the lock-out chamber, which is essentially like a fixed submarine, maintaining internal air pressures lower than ambient sea pressure down to one atmosphere, with an airlock to enable entry and exit underwater. Underwater habitats may have connected chambers with moon pools and lock-out chambers.

=== Examples of underwater habitats with moon pools ===
- SEALAB II (US Navy)
- The Florida laboratory Aquarius, where it is called a wet porch

== In fishing vessels ==
Moon pools are becoming increasingly used on longline fishing vessels to allow for hauling of the gear in worse weather conditions. They also reduce the exposure of fish to air, improving quality. Along with bird scaring lines, shooting and hauling gear from a moon pool reduces the risk of fish falling off or being predated by birds.

== Gallery of types ==
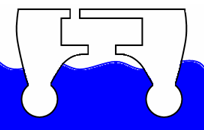
Cross-section of an open moon pool above the waterline, in a catamaran or a semi-submersible platform

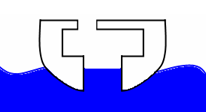
An open moon pool at the waterline, in a ship or floating structure

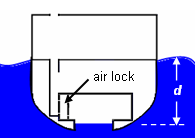
A moon pool below the waterline in an airtight chamber, in a ship or floating structure

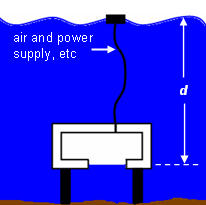
A moon pool below the waterline in an airtight submerged chamber

== See also ==
- Diving bell – Chamber for transporting divers vertically through the water
- Diving support vessel – Ship used as a floating base for professional diving projects
- Underwater habitat – Human habitable underwater enclosure filled with breathable gas
