= Cerberus FTP Server =

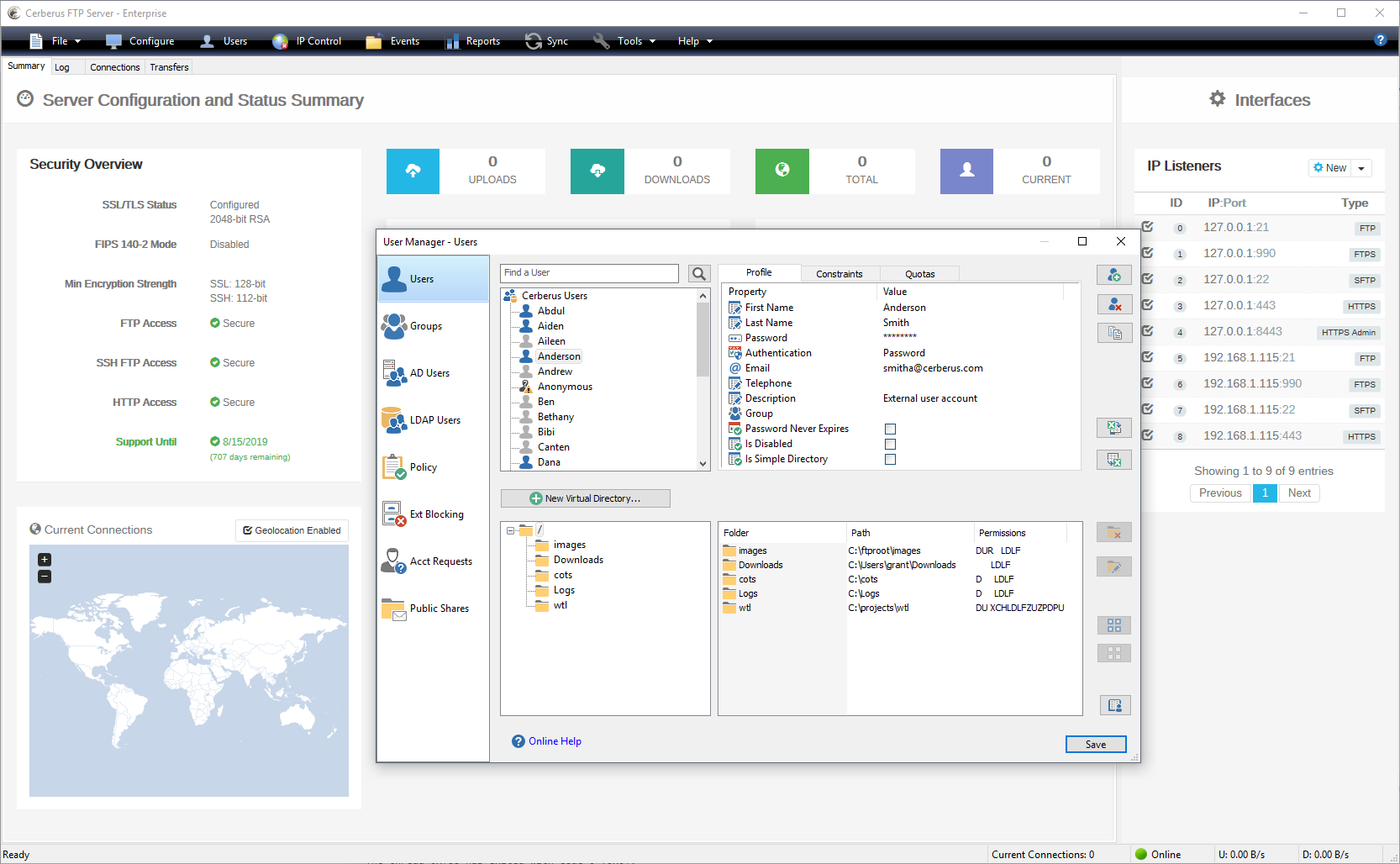
- This is a screenshot of the Cerberus FTP Server User Manager administration page.
- Developers: Cerberus, LLC
- Release: March 2001; 25 years ago
- Stable release: 2026.2 / May 26, 2026; 5 months ago
- Operating system: Windows
- Type: FTP server
- License: Proprietary software
- Website: www.cerberusftp.com

Cerberus FTP Server is a Windows-based FTP server with support for encrypted FTP sessions via FTPS and SFTP as well as web client support via HTTP and HTTPS. The server exposes files using a virtual file system and supports user authentication via built-in users and groups, Active Directory, LDAP and public key authentication. Cerberus FTP Server was acquired by Redwood Software in 2023, which currently develops and supports the software.
