= HMAS Cerberus =

HMAS Cerberus is the name given to a number of Royal Australian Navy ships and shore establishments, after the mythological Cerberus.

- HMAS Cerberus was a breastwork monitor that was transferred from the Victorian Naval Forces to the Commonwealth Naval Forces in 1901, and the Royal Australian Navy in 1911. In 1921, the ship was renamed HMAS Platypus II, and tasked as a submarine tender for the RAN's six J-class submarines. She was decommissioned in 1921 and disposed of in 1924. She was sunk as a breakwater off Half Moon Bay.
- HMAS Cerberus (naval base) is the former Flinders Naval Depot which was renamed HMAS Cerberus in 1921 and is the Royal Australian Navy's primary training establishment, located at Crib Point on the Mornington Peninsula, south of Melbourne, Victoria.

The Cerberus name was also given to a number of subsidiary depots and auxiliary vessels. These units were identified with Roman numerals.

- HMAS Cerberus II was the gunboat HMAS Protector, renamed on 1 April 1921 as Cerberus II until reverting to Protector in 1924
- HMAS Cerberus III, the Naval Reserve Depot at Port Melbourne, was commissioned as HMAS Lonsdale on 1 August 1940
- HMAS Cerberus III was the tug Kooronga
- HMAS Cerberus IV the Naval Reserve Depot at Port Adelaide, was commissioned as HMAS Torrens (naval base) on 1 August 1940
- HMAS Cerberus IV was the tug TB 10
- HMAS Cerberus V, the Naval Reserve Depot at Fremantle, was commissioned HMAS Leeuwin on 1 August 1940
- HMAS Cerberus V was the tug TB 1536 Dooen transferred from the Australian Army in 1958
- HMAS Cerberus VI was the naval depot in Hobart; later renamed HMAS Derwent, then HMAS Huon
