= Diving support vessel =

Ship used as a floating base for professional diving projects

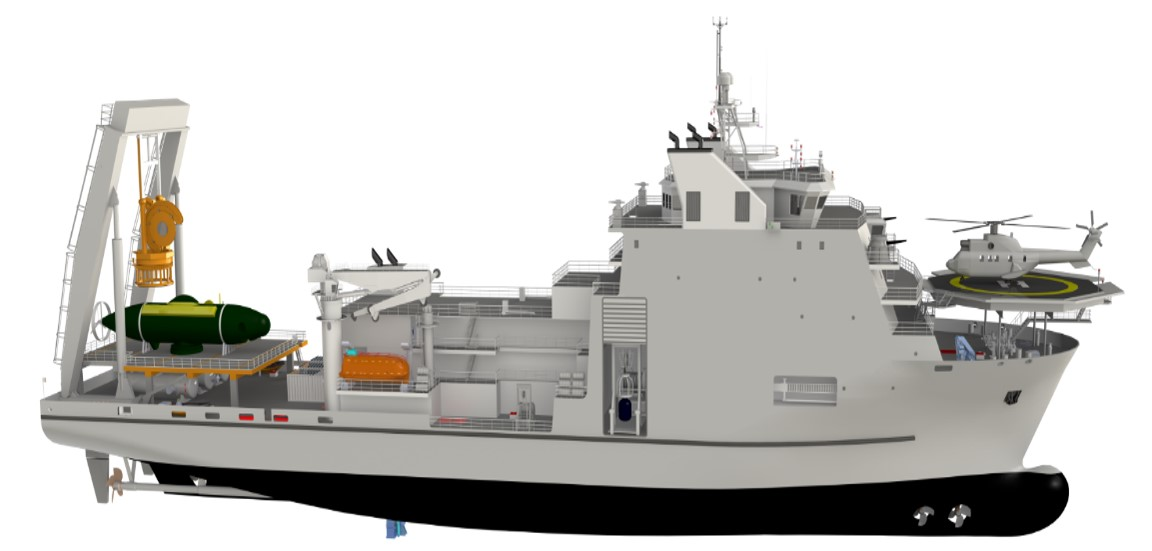
Design of the Nistar-class diving support vessel of the Indian Navy

A diving support vessel is a ship that is used as a floating base for professional diving projects. Basic requirements are the ability to keep station accurately and reliably throughout a diving operation, often in close proximity to drilling or production platforms, for positioning to degrade slowly enough in deteriorating conditions to recover divers without excessive risk, and to carry the necessary support equipment for the mode of diving to be used.

Recent offshore diving support vessels tend to be dynamically positioned (DP) and double as remotely operated underwater vehicle (ROV) support vessels, and also be capable of supporting seismic survey operations and cable-laying operations. DP makes a wider range of operations possible, but the platform presents some inherent hazards, particularly the thrusters, making launch and recovery by diving bell widespread. They may use a moonpool to shelter the position where the bell or ROV enters and exits the water, and the launch and recovery system may also use a bell cursor to constrain relative movement through the splash zone, and heave compensation to minimise depth variation of the bell during the dive. Accommodations must be provided for the teams supporting whichever functions the vessel is contracted for.

DSVs for inshore operations tend to be much smaller, and may operate while moored for shallow work. Live-boating operations are considered unacceptably hazardous for surface supplied diving unless a stage or bell is used to keep the divers' umbilicals clear of the vessel's thrusters

== Description ==
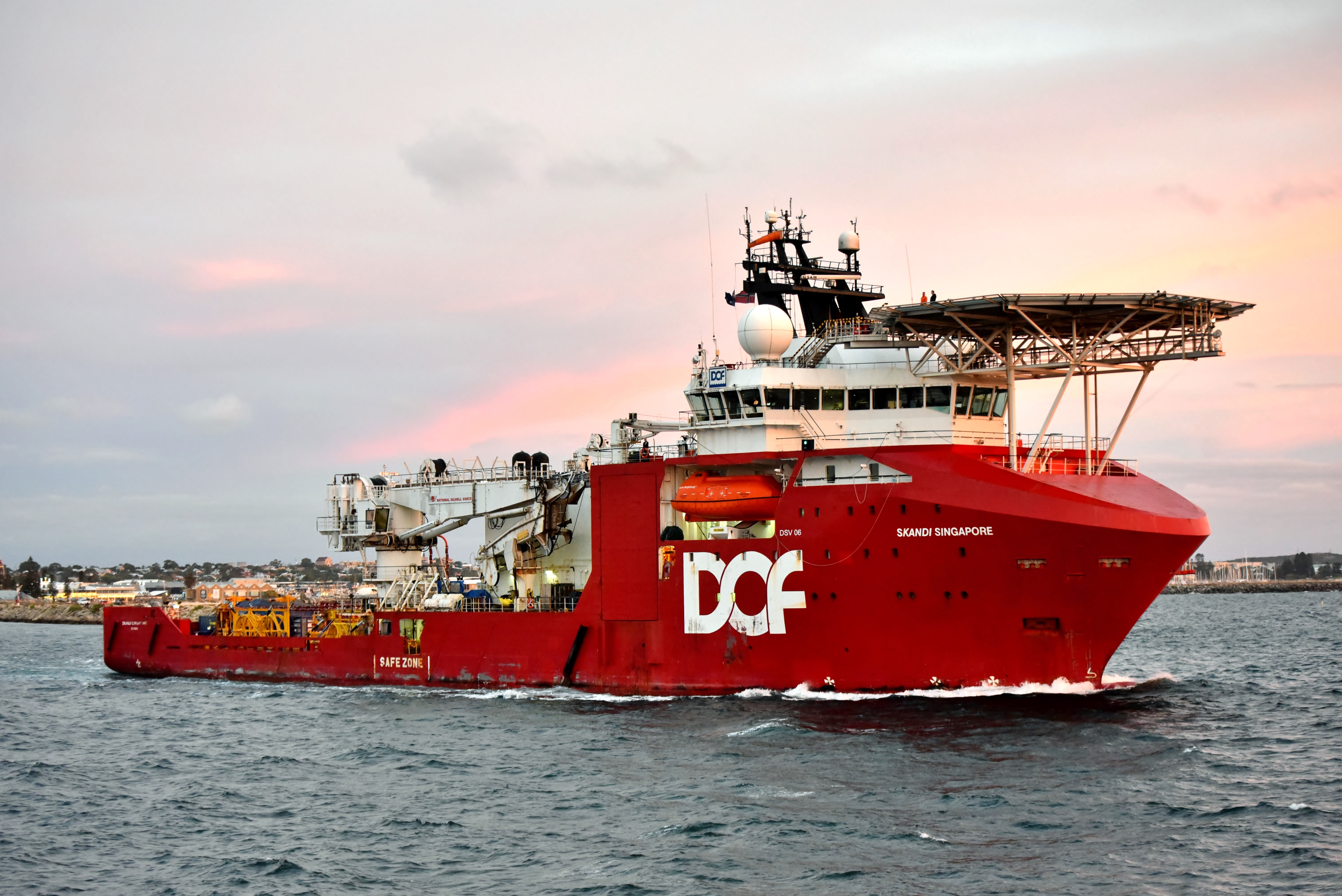
CSV Skandi Singapore departing Fremantle, Australia

A diving support vessel is a ship that is used as a floating base for professional diving projects. Basic requirements are the ability to keep station accurately and reliably throughout a diving operation, often in close proximity to drilling or production platforms, for positioning to degrade slowly enough in deteriorating conditions to recover divers without excessive risk, and to carry the necessary support equipment for the mode of diving to be used.

== History ==
Commercial diving support vessels emerged during the 1960s and 1970s, when the need arose for offshore diving operations to be performed below and around oil production platforms and associated installations in open water in the North Sea and Gulf of Mexico. Until that point, most diving operations were from mobile oil drilling platforms, pipe-lay, or crane barges. The diving system tended to be modularised and craned on and off the vessels as a package.

As permanent oil and gas production platforms emerged, the owners and operators were not keen to give over valuable deck space to diving systems because after they came on-line the expectation of continuing diving operations was low.

However, equipment fails or gets damaged, and there was a regular if not continuous need for diving operations in and around oil fields. The solution was to put diving packages on ships. Initially these tended to be oilfield supply ships or fishing vessels; however, keeping this kind of ship 'on station', particularly during uncertain weather, made the diving dangerous, problematic and seasonal. Furthermore, seabed operations usually entailed the raising and lowering of heavy equipment, and most such vessels were not equipped for this task.

This is when the dedicated commercial diving support vessel emerged. These were often built from scratch or heavily converted pipe carriers or other utility ships. The key components of the diving support vessel are:

- Dynamic Positioning – Controlled by a computer with input from position reference systems (DGPS, Transponders, Light Taut Wires or RadaScan), it will maintain the ship's position over a dive site by using multi-directional thrusters, other sensors would compensate for swell, tide and prevailing wind.
- Saturation diving system – For diving operations below 50 m, a mixture of helium and oxygen (heliox) is required to eliminate the narcotic effect of nitrogen under pressure. For extended diving operations at depth, saturation diving is the preferred approach. A saturation system would be installed within the ship. A diving bell would transport the divers between the saturation system and the work site lowered through a 'moon pool' in the bottom of the ship, usually with a support structure 'cursor' to support the diving bell through the turbulent waters near the surface. There are a number of support systems for the saturation system on a diving support vessel, usually including a remotely operated vehicle ROV and heavy lifting equipment.

=== Modern diving support vessels ===
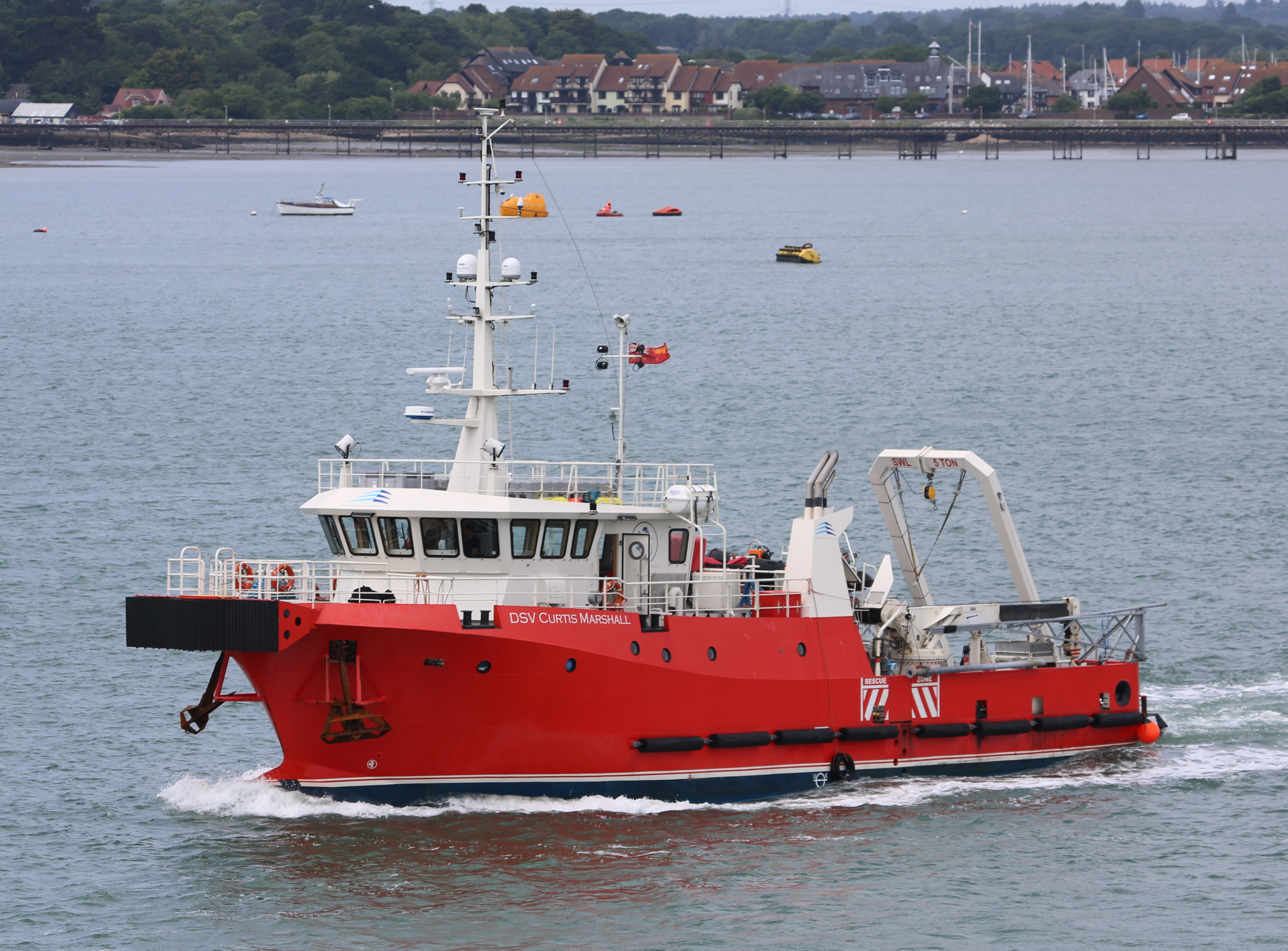
The 2015 launched DSV Curtis Marshall

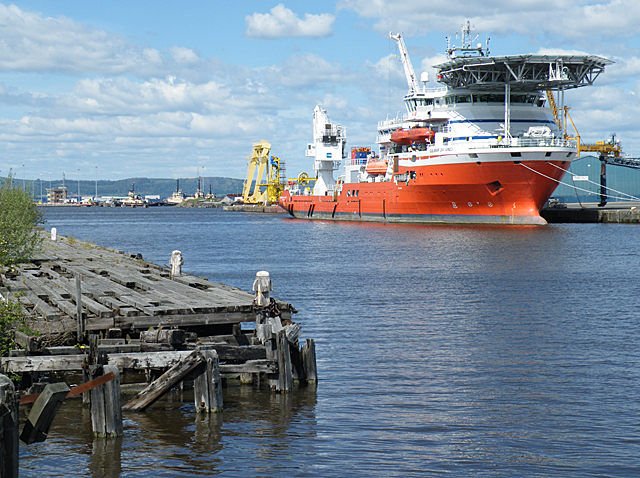
Gulmar Da Vinci in Albert Dock

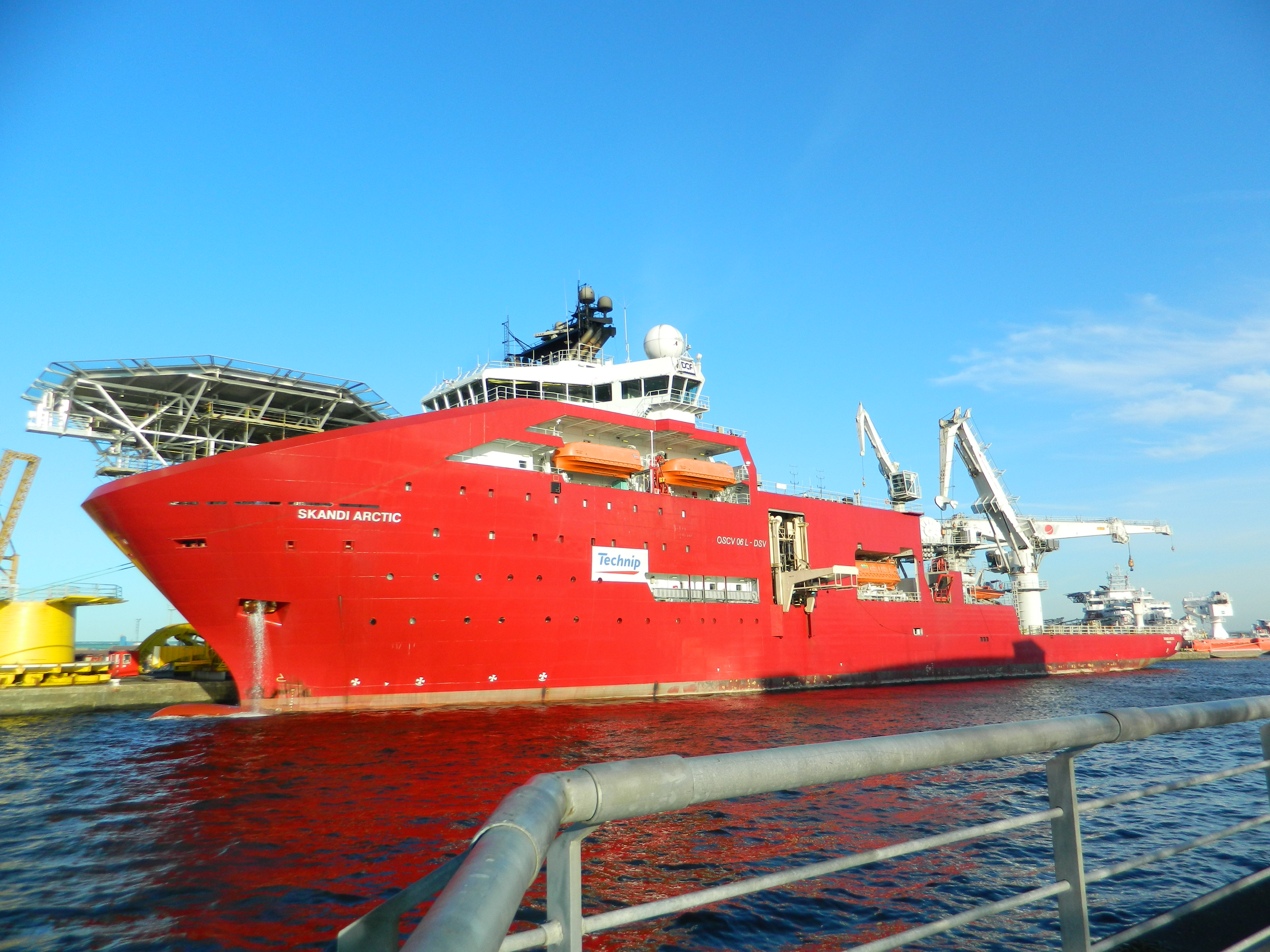
The Skandi Arctic supply vessel in Leith docks

Most of the vessels currently in the North Sea have been built in the 1980s. The semi-submersible fleet, the Uncle John and similar, have proven to be too expensive to maintain and too slow to move between fields. Therefore, most existing designs are monohull vessels with either a one or a twin bell dive system. There has been little innovation since the 1980s. However, driven by high oil prices since 2004, the market for subsea developments in the North Sea has grown significantly. This has led to a scarcity of diving support vessels and has driven the price up. Thus, contractors have ordered a number of newbuild vessels which are expected to enter the market in 2008.

More recent vessels are designed and built to support both diving activities and remotely operated vehicles (ROVs) operations with dedicated hangar and LARS for ROV's, and to support seismic survey operations and cable-laying operations. They may carry 80 to 150 project personnel on board, including divers, diving supervisors and superintendents, dive technicians, life support technicians and supervisors, ROV pilots, ROV superintendents, survey team, clients personnel, etc. For all these personnel to carry out their contracted job with an oil and gas company, a professional crew navigate and operate the vessel according to the contract requirements and instructions of project superintendents. However, ultimate responsibility lies on the master of the vessel for the safety of every person on board. In expanding the utility of the vessel, these vessels provide, in addition to the usual domestic facilities, specialised diving mixed gas compressors and reclaim systems, gas storage and blending facilities, and saturation diving accommodation systems where the divers live under compression. These vessels are available to be hired by diving contractors or directly by oil and gas contractors who then will subcontract a specialist service-provider to use the vessel as a platform to carry out their activities.

== Special features ==
=== Dynamic positioning ===
Dynamic positioning (DP) is a computer-controlled system to automatically maintain a vessel's position and heading by using its own propellers and thrusters. Position reference sensors, combined with wind sensors, motion sensors and gyrocompasses, provide information to the computer pertaining to the vessel's position and the magnitude and direction of environmental forces affecting its position. Dynamic positioning is a great advantage for saturation diving operations as the risk to the divers and the work area from anchor patterns is reduced, and the vessel can be positioned more quickly.

=== Saturation system ===
The "saturation system", "saturation complex" or "saturation spread" typically comprises a surface complex made up of a living chamber, transfer chamber and submersible decompression chamber, which is commonly referred to in commercial diving and military diving as the diving bell, PTC (personnel transfer capsule) or SDC (submersible decompression chamber). The system can be permanently installed on the ship or can be capable of being moved from one vessel to another by crane. The entire system is managed from a control room ("van"), where depth, chamber atmosphere and other system parameters are monitored and controlled. The diving bell is the elevator or lift that transfers divers from the system to the work site. Typically, it is mated to the system utilizing a removable clamp and is separated from the system tankage bulkhead by a trunking space, a kind of tunnel, through which the divers transfer to and from the bell. At the completion of work or a mission, the saturation diving team is decompressed gradually back to atmospheric pressure by the slow venting of system pressure, at an average of 15 metres (49 ft) to 30 metres (98 ft) per day (schedules vary). The process involves only one decompression, thereby avoiding the time-consuming and comparatively risky process of in-water, staged decompression or sur-D O_{2} operations normally associated with non-saturation mixed gas diving. More than one living chamber can be linked to the transfer chamber through trunking so that diving teams can be stored at different depths where this is a logistical requirement. An extra chamber can be fitted to transfer personnel into and out of the system while under pressure and to treat divers for decompression sickness if this should be necessary.

The divers use surface supplied umbilical diving equipment, utilizing deep diving breathing gas, such as helium and oxygen mixtures, stored in large capacity, high pressure cylinders. The gas supplies are plumbed to the control room, where they are routed to supply the system components. The bell is fed via a large, multi-part umbilical that supplies breathing gas, electricity, communications and hot water. The bell also is fitted with exterior mounted breathing gas cylinders for emergency use.

While in the water the divers will often use a hot water suit to protect against the cold. The hot water comes from boilers on the surface and is pumped down to the diver via the bell's umbilical and then through the diver's umbilical.

The transfer chamber is where the bell is mated to the surface saturation system for transfer under pressure (TUP). It is a wet surface chamber where divers prepare for a dive and strip off and clean their gear after return. Connection to the bell may be overhead, through the bottom hatch of the bell, or lateral, through a side door.

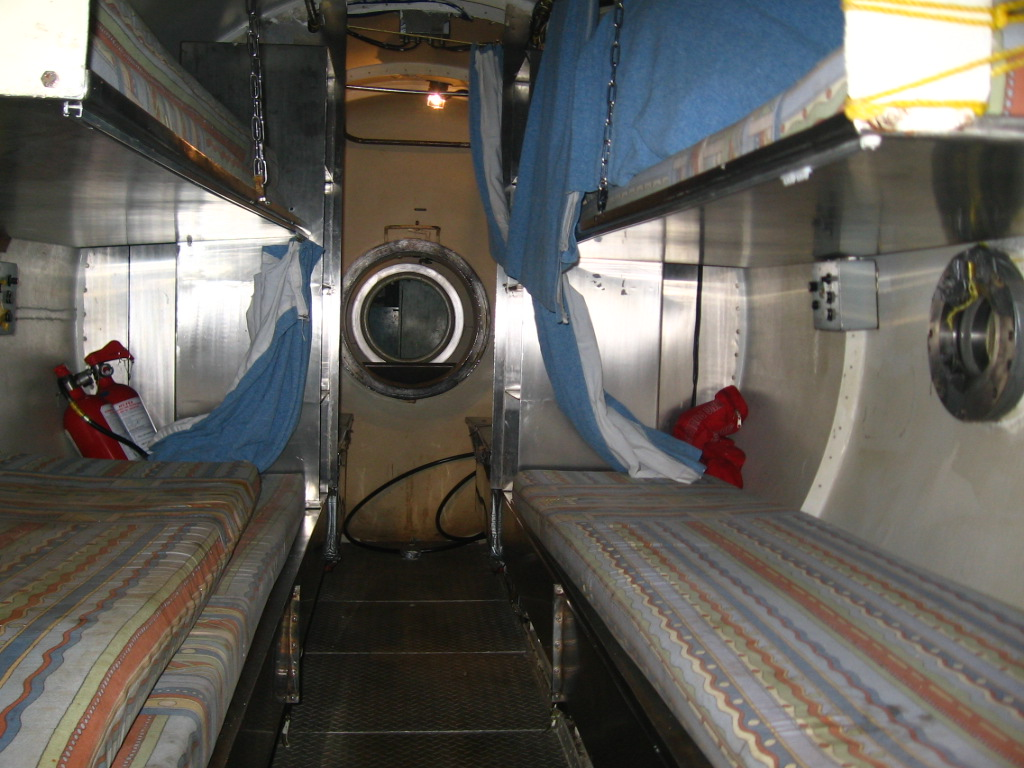
Accommodation chamber of a saturation spread

The accommodation chambers may be as small as 100 square feet. This part is generally made of multiple compartments, including living, sanitation, and rest facilities, each a separate unit, joined by short lengths of cylindrical trunking. It is usually possible to isolate each compartment from the others using internal pressure doors.

=== Diving bell ===
A closed diving bell, also known as personnel transfer capsule or submersible decompression chamber, is used to transport divers between the workplace and the accommodations chambers. The bell is a cylindrical or spherical pressure vessel with a hatch at the bottom, and may mate with the surface transfer chamber at the bottom hatch or at a side door. Bells are usually designed to carry two or three divers, one of whom, the bellman, stays inside the bell at the bottom and is stand-by diver to the working divers. Each diver is supplied by an umbilical from inside the bell. The bell has a set of high pressure gas storage cylinders mounted on the outside containing on-board reserve breathing gas. The on-board gas and main gas supply are distributed from the bell gas panel, which is controlled by the bellman. The bell may have viewports and external lights. The divers' umbilicals are stored on racks inside the bell during transfer, and are tended by the bellman during the dive.

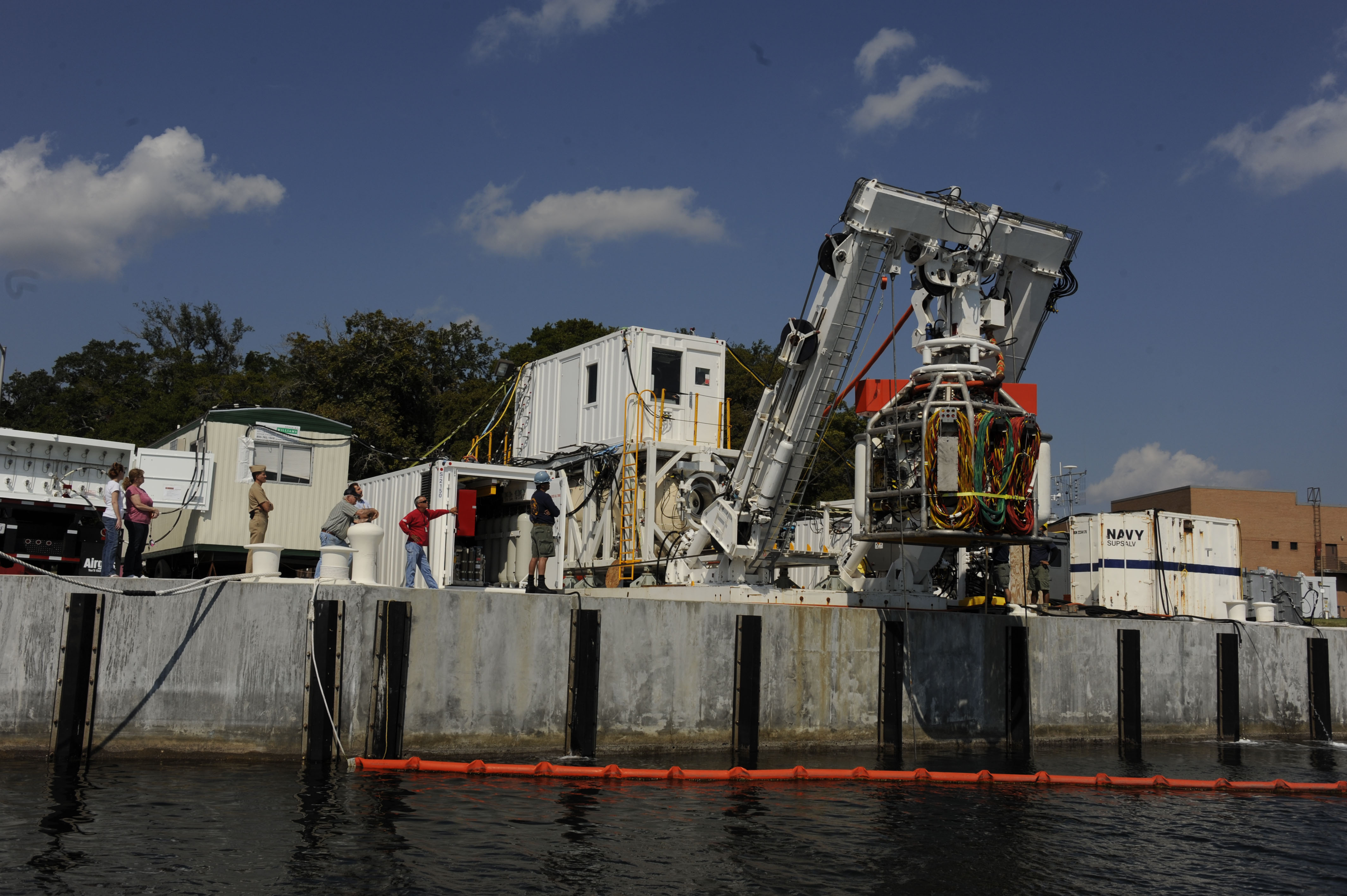
The bell handling system lowers the diving bell of the US Navy's saturation fly-away diving system into the water.

The bell is deployed from a gantry or A-frame, also known as a bell launch and recovery system (LARS), on the vessel or platform, using a winch. Deployment may be over the side or through a moon pool.

- The handling system must be able to support the dynamic loads imposed by operating in a range of weather conditions.
- It must be able to move the bell through the air/water interface (splash zone) in a controlled way, fast enough to avoid excessive movement caused by wave action.
- A bell cursor may be used to limit lateral motion through and above the splash zone.
- It must keep the bell clear of the vessel or platform to prevent impact damage or injury.
- It must have sufficient power for fast retrieval of the bell in an emergency, and fine control to facilitate mating of the bell and transfer flange, and to accurately place the bell at the bottom.
- It must include a system to move the bell between the mating flange of the transfer chamber and the launch/retrieval position.

Diving bells are deployed over the side of the vessel or platform using a gantry or A-frame from which the clump weight and the bell are suspended. On dive support vessels with in-built saturation systems the bell may be deployed through a moon pool. The bell handling system is also known as the launch and recovery system (LARS). This is also used to move the bell from the position where it is locked on to the chamber system into the water, lower it to the working depth and hold it at that depth without excessive movement, for which heave compensation equipment may be fitted to the winch, and recover it to the chamber system. The system used to transfer the bell on deck may be a deck trolley system, an overhead gantry or a swinging A-frame. The system must constrain movement of the supported bell sufficiently to allow accurate location on the chamber trunking even in bad weather. A bell cursor may be used to control movement through and above the splash zone, and heave compensation gear may be used to limit vertical movement when in the water and clear of the cursor, particularly at working depth when the diver may be locked out and the bell is open to ambient pressure. Cross-hauling gear may be useful to place the bell closer to the worksite if the ship cannot safely approach it to a convenient distance

=== Moon pool ===
A moon pool is an opening in the base of the hull, giving access to the water below, which allows divers, diving bells, remotely operated underwater vehicles or other equipment to enter or leave the water easily and in a relatively protected environment.

== Diving from a DSV ==
Diving from a DSV makes a wider range of operations possible, but the platform presents some inherent hazards, and equipment and procedures must be adopted to manage these hazards as well as the hazards of the environment and diving tasks.

=== Hazards ===
- Hazards of the positioning system
  - Anchor patterns
  - Dynamic positioning thrusters
  - Dynamic positioning runout
- Hazards of the diver deployment system

=== Equipment ===
- On board recompression facilities or saturation system
- Equipment to transport the diver through high risk zones: Stages, wet and dry bells, bell cursors and launch and recovery systems.
- Cross-hauling gear.
- Equipment to limit access to known hazards
- Hyperbaric evacuation facilities
- Breathing gas storage, gas blending, distribution and helium reclaim systems.
- Associated equipment:
  - Remotely operated underwater vehicles (ROVs)
  - Rigging and lifting gear
  - Tools and equipment for underwater work
  - Tools and equipment for maintenance and repair of diving systems

=== Procedures ===
Standard practices for diving from a DSV include the use of stages, wet and dry bells to transport the diver through the interface between air and water, to avoid hazards, and for decompression.

When using dynamic positioning, a surface supplied mode is used, and the length and routing of the diver's umbilical is used to prevent the diver from closely approaching known high risk hazards like thrusters.

Underwater umbilical tending may be by passing the umbilical through the stage frame, tended from the surface, or from a bell, tended by the bellman. Additional underwater tending points may be needed, and one of the methods used is for the diver to pass through a heavy hoop, which may be deployed by crane to a specific position on or near the bottom, The reach of the umbilical beyond each tending point should not allow the diver close approach to known high risk hazards.

== See also ==
- Dive boat – Boat used for the support of scuba diving operations
- Commercial offshore diving – Professional diving in support of the oil and gas industry
- Saturation diving – Diving mode and decompression technique
- Professional diving – Underwater diving where divers are paid for their work
- Dynamic positioning – Automatic ship station- and heading-holding systems
- Diving bell – Chamber for transporting divers vertically through the water
