= Nine Mile =

Nine Mile or Ninemile may refer to:

== Places ==
=== Australia ===
- Nine Mile, Queensland, a locality in the Rockhampton region
- Nine Mile Station, a pastoral lease in New South Wales

=== United States ===
- Nine Mile, Indiana, an unincorporated community
- Ninemile, Ohio, an unincorporated community
- Ninemile Canyon, in eastern Utah
- Nine Mile Prairie, a tract of conserved tallgrass prairie in Nebraska
- Ninemile Island (Pennsylvania), in the Allegheny River

=== Other places ===
- 9 Mile, Lae, Morobe Province, Papua New Guinea
- Nine Mile, Jamaica, home town of Bob Marley
- Nine Mile Lake, Nova Scotia
- Nine Mile River (disambiguation), multiple rivers
- Ninemile Creek (disambiguation)

== Transport ==
- Nine Mile (RTD), a transit station in Aurora, Colorado
- Nine-Mile Circle, a defunct streetcar line in Atlanta
- Nine Mile Road (disambiguation), various roads

== Other uses ==
- Nine Mile (band), a Canadian pop-rock band based in Toronto
- "9 Mile", a song by Ab-Soul from the album Soul Burger (2024)
