= Glossary of underwater diving terminology: P–S =

List of terms used in underwater diving and their meanings in context

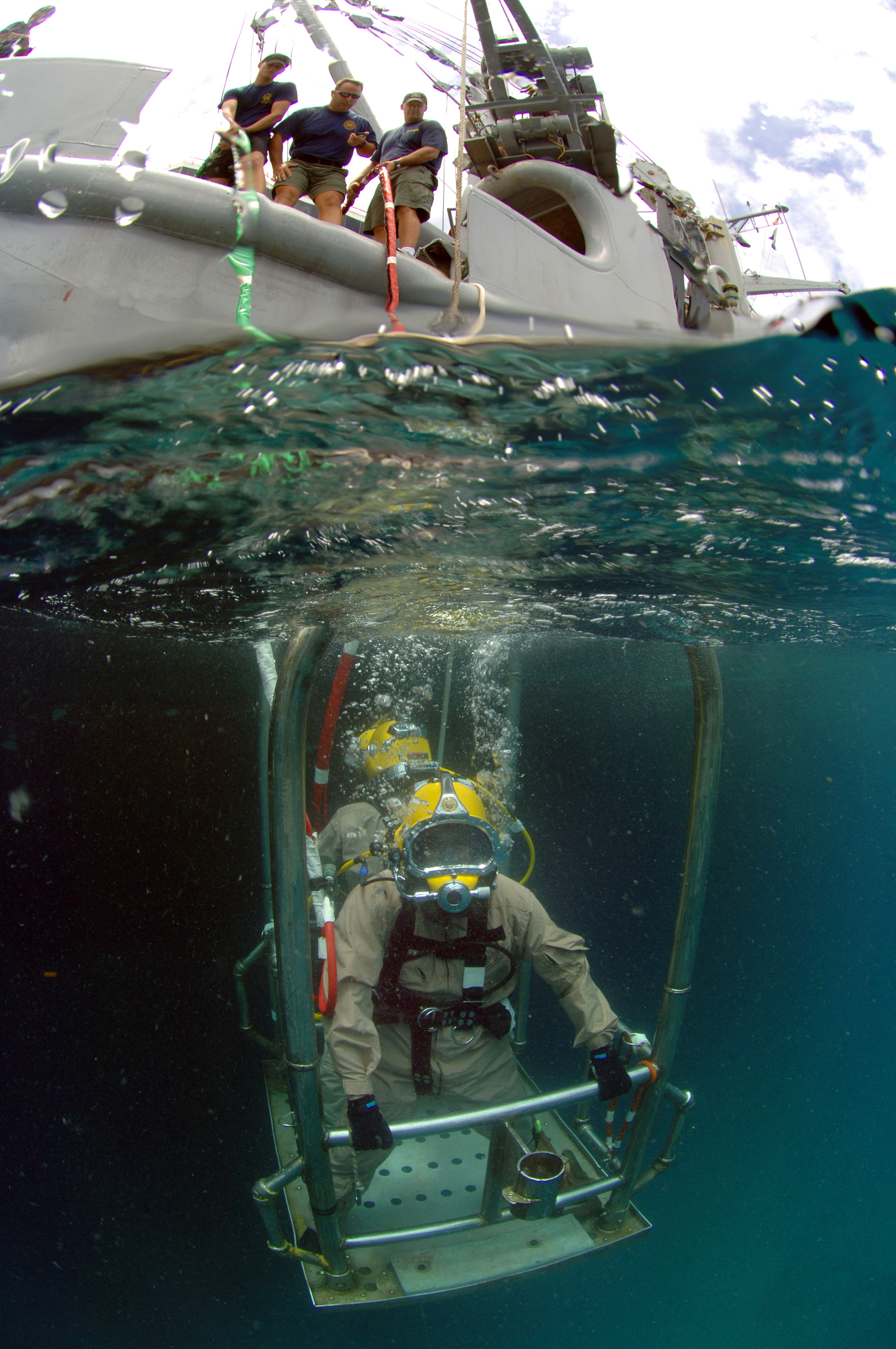
Surface-supplied divers riding a stage to the underwater workplace

This is a glossary of technical terms, jargon, diver slang and acronyms used in underwater diving. The definitions listed are in the context of underwater diving. There may be other meanings in other contexts.

The appeal of underwater diving as a human activity is usually associated with the view into an underwater environment that is typically inaccessible in daily life on land. Practitioners submerge below the surface of the water for a range of purposes, such as recreation, underwater photography, exploration of marine biology and nautical archaeology, search for shipwrecks, and other types of research.

Underwater divers may use no equipment at all, or a wide range of equipment which may include breathing apparatus, environmental protective clothing, aids to vision, communication, propulsion, maneuverability, buoyancy and safety equipment, and tools for the task at hand.

Many of the terms are in general use by English speaking divers from many parts of the world, both amateur and professional, and using any of the modes of diving. Others are more specialised, variable by location, mode, or professional environment. There are instances where a term may have more than one meaning depending on context, and others where several terms refer to the same concept, or there are variations in spelling. A few are loan-words from other languages.

There are five sub-glossaries, listed here. The tables of content should link between them automatically:

- Glossary of underwater diving terminology: A–C
- Glossary of underwater diving terminology: D–G
- Glossary of underwater diving terminology: H–O
- Glossary of underwater diving terminology: P–S
- Glossary of underwater diving terminology: T–Z

== P ==
Contents: Top	A	B	C	D	E	F	G	H	I	J	K	L	M	N	O	P	Q	R	S	T	U	V	W	X	Y	Z	References

Subsection: Top, Pa, Pe, Pi, Po, Pu

== Pa ==
panic

A sudden sensation of fear which is so strong as to dominate or prevent reason and logical thinking, replacing it with overwhelming feelings of anxiety and frantic agitation consistent with an irrational fight-or-flight reaction
parallel compartments

A decompression model comprising a group of tissues with varied rates of perfusion, but supplied by blood of approximately equivalent gas concentration. It is assumed that there is no gas transfer between tissue compartments by diffusion. This results in a parallel set of independent tissues, each with its own rate of ingassing and outgassing dependent on the rate of blood flowing through the tissue
partial pressure

(Abbreviation PP or pp) The pressure that a component gas of a gas mixture would exert if it alone was present in the volume occupied by the gas mixture.
partial pressure gradient

The rate of change of partial pressure of dissolved gas through a solvent, which is the driving mechanism for diffusion through the solvent. Also loosely used to refer to the difference between the dissolved gas pressure in a tissue and ambient pressure.
passive addition

Feed gas addition system for semi-closed circuit rebreathers which discharges a part of the gas in the breathing circuit. fresh gas is added when the volume of the circuit decreases during inhalation and triggers the addition valve. Compare with active addition.
patent foramen ovale

A common form of congenital heart defect that enables blood flow between the left and right atria through a gap in the interatrial septum. In some circumstances this may increase risk of decompression sickness if venous blood carrying gas bubbles is shunted into the arterial system, bypassing the pulmonary capillary network filter.

Subsection: Top, Pa, Pe, Pi, Po, Pu

== Pe ==
pendulum rebreather

Rebreather with a single breathing hose from the mouthpiece to the scrubber and counterlung. Gas passes through it in both directions, unlike the one-way breathing loop configuration. The volume of the hose between the mouthpiece and scrubber is dead space
penetration

Entering a region with no direct vertical access to the surface, such as a cave or the interior of a wreck.
penetration line

percolation
Cave diving: Bubbles making their way to the walls and the ceiling of the cave and dislodging silt.
perfusion

The passage of fluid through the circulatory system or lymphatic system to an organ or a tissue, usually referring to the delivery of blood to a capillary bed in tissue.
perfusion limited

The assumption in a decompression model that perfusion has the dominant influence on gas uptake and release. Compare with diffusion limited.
permanent stamp markings
permanent markings
stamp markings

Text and symbols stamped into the metal of the shoulder of a diving cylinder providing obligatory and optional information about the cylinder.
personal locator beacon

Radio beacons for personal use which are intended to indicate a person in distress who is away from normal emergency services.
personal protective equipment
personal safety equipment

Equipment worn by personnel to reduce risk of injury at sites where it is not practicable to eliminate the hazard, including ear protectors, safety glasses, hard hats, gloves, overalls, respirators etc. Diving suits and underwater breathing apparatus are also personal protective equipment.
PFO

photo quadrat

A photograph of a quadrat taken for later analysis. Common in marine ecological research where in situ counting would be impractical. Quadrats may be identified by rigid frames or by a fixed camera to subject distance.

Subsection: Top, Pa, Pe, Pi, Po, Pu

== Pi ==
pig

Pipeline inspection gauge: A tool that is sent through a pipeline and propelled by the pressure of the product in the pipeline itself, for purposes such as cleaning, dewatering, inspecting, measuring, separation of contents, etc.
pigtail
Coiled section of pipe to provide greater flexibility.
pillar valve

pin index connection

Standard connection type for portable medical oxygen cylinder valves and regulators.
pinnacle
A distinct local high point on a reef, similar to a geological pinnacle, but usage is somewhat looser, and may refer to a large boulder on top of a outcrop, or the tallest in a cluster of high points. In many cases the exact topography is unknown as it has not been seen or surveyed in high enough resolution. The term usually implies a submerged feature but has also been applied to exposed and half-tide rocks.
pipeline end manifold

The place where a flexible underwater hose string is attached to connect a seabed pipeline with a single point mooring.
piston bolt

placement
1. Securing the guideline as it is being run.
2. The choice of primary and secondary tie offs of the guideline.
3. The laying of fresh concrete.
PLB

PLEM

plug stab
(also dummy stab, parking stab) A plug to protect a hot stab receptacle when not in use.
pneumo breathing

Use of the pneumofathometer hose to supply breathing gas to a surface supplied diver in an emergency. Supply can be from the diver's own pneumo hose or from a standby diver's pneumo hose.
pneumofathometer

Instrument to measure the depth of a diver, which measures the ambient pressure at the diver by measuring the pressure in a hose filled with air with an open end at the diver and with the surface end connected to a gas supply, control valve and pressure gauge calibrated in msw, fsw, or often both.
pneumothorax

Air or other breathing gas in the chest cavity, outside of the lung, particularly between the pulmonary pleurae, sometimes resulting in a collapsed lung.

Subsection: Top, Pa, Pe, Pi, Po, Pu

== Po ==
pony cylinder
pony bottle
pony tank

Relatively small scuba set, usually carried as an independent alternative breathing gas source by a recreational scuba diver.
P-port
A large bore airtight quick connector fitting designed and used by Dräger on diving and firefighting breathing apparatus, for ambient pressure breathing gas connections, which has been used in rebreathers, particularly modifications, and full-face masks. Part of the Dräger P-connector system.
positive displacement

(of compressor) A configuration that compresses gas by reducing the volume of the compression chamber (eg. cylinder) by mechanical means (eg. piston) to produce higher pressure of the contents which flow out via the exhaust port, usually through a non-return valve.

May also refer to a pump in which a fixed volume is transferred during each cycle, relatively independent of inlet and outlet pressures.
positive pressure breathing
positive static lung load

Breathing against an external pressure slightly greater than the relaxed pressure in the lungs. More effort is needed to exhale, less to inhale. This can occur when using a positive pressure mask, front mounted counterlungs on a rebreather, or if in a steep head down position with a single-hose demand valve.
positive pressure mask

A full-face mask which maintains an internal pressure slightly higher than external ambient pressure, necessitating slight positive pressure breathing, and ensuring that if the mask skirt seal fails, gas will leak out, rather than water leaking in, which provides a more secure airway and provides some protection against contaminated water.
precautionary stop
precautionary decompression stop

pre-fill external inspection

Examination of the external condition of a pressure vessel and fittings to ensure that it complies with requirements before accepting for filling.
pre-mix

Nitrox blend supplied in bulk containers for decanting or boosting for direct use, or with high oxygen content used to blend nitrox of lower oxygen content by topping up the decanted pre-mix with air.
pressure transducer

A component that produces an output signal proportional to a pressure input, which can be processed to give an output indicating the pressure. Used in dive computers, electronic pressure gauges, and pressure transmitters, among other uses.
pressure transmitter

Pressure transducer (q.v.) with a wireless transmitter that sends a coded signal to the diver's dive computer which uses the data to display remaining cylinder pressure, which can in some applications be used to provide other gas management information.
primary light
The main light to be used on a dive. Usually the most powerful.
primary regulator
the regulator which the diver intends to breathe from for most of the dive. Particularly when diving with back-mounted manifolded twin cylinders.
primary tie-off
First tie off of the guideline in a penetration dive. This is usually made in a place with free vertical access to the surface.
professional diving

Diving which is done as part of the diver's employment or professional occupation. Definitions vary in different jurisdictions.
progressive penetration

An incremental approach to cave and wreck exploration. Each dive goes a bit further so that the divers develop a familiarity with the environment.
PRV

Type of safety valve used to control or limit the pressure in a system.
psi

Unit of pressure in the Imperial system.
PTT

Push to talk: Voice communication systems which require the user to press a button to transmit. Used with through water systems to conserve battery power.

Subsection: Top, Pa, Pe, Pi, Po, Pu

== Pu ==
public safety diving

The underwater work conducted by law enforcement, fire department rescue, and search & rescue/recovery dive teams.
pull
1. A relatively long pull on a lifeline when used for rope signals. (see "bell" for comparison).
2. Part of an ascent between the bottom and a decompression stop, between decompression stops, or to the surface. Possibly deriving from the practice of the diver's tender pulling a surface-supplied diver up by the umbilical or lifeline, and stopping the ascent at the depths planned for staged decompression.
pulmonary over-inflation syndrome

Pulmonary barotrauma of ascent related diseases. Lung over-pressure injury which may manifest as arterial gas embolism, pneumothorax, tension pneumothorax, mediastinal emphysema, subcutaneous emphysema or occasionally pneumopericardium.
purge
1. To press the purge button on a demand valve to induce a gas flow which is intended to clear the demand valve, full-face mask, or demand helmet interior of water or other substances.
2. Flush the breathing circuit of an oxygen rebreather to remove residual inert gas.
purge button

Button or flexible area on the front or side of a demand valve which allows the user to manually open the second stage valve to provide gas flow without inhalation.
purge valve

Non-return valve in snorkel or mask which allows water to drain either under gravity or as a result of exhalation into the air space
push gradient
Tech diving jargon: Decompress at a high gradient factor, particularly when exceeding the baseline M-value. This will expose the diver to a higher risk of developing decompression sickness while reducing time decompressing in the water.
push-pull diving helmet

Gas recycling system for free-flow diving helmet using ambient gas from the bell or habitat.
push-pull rebreather

P-valve

A valved catheter fitted to a dry suit, which enables a diver to urinate at any time without having to get out of the water.
Pyle stop

Named after Richard Pyle, an early advocate of deep stops. An additional brief deep decompression stop, typically 2 minutes long and half way between the maximum depth and the first conventional decompression stop.

== Q ==
Contents: Top	A	B	C	D	E	F	G	H	I	J	K	L	M	N	O	P	Q	R	S	T	U	V	W	X	Y	Z	References

quick link
Oval connector shaped like a chain link with a screw gate on one side.
quad
A group of high pressure gas storage cylinders mounted upright on a rectangular frame and manifolded together. Usually in 4, 6, 9, 12, or 16 cylinder arrangements.
quadrat

A small, typically rectangular plot used in ecology and geography to isolate a standard unit of area for study of the distribution of an item over a large area. The quadrat is suitable for sampling plants and slow-moving or sessile animals.

== R ==
Contents: Top	A	B	C	D	E	F	G	H	I	J	K	L	M	N	O	P	Q	R	S	T	U	V	W	X	Y	Z	References

Subsection: Top, Ra, Re, Ri, Ro, Ru

== Ra ==
rams head

Frame attached to the top of back-mounted scuba cylinders to protect valves, manifold, and regulator first stages from impact with the surroundings.
rapture of the deep

rash guard
rash vest
rashie

A shirt made of spandex and nylon or polyester, worn to protect against rashes caused by abrasion, and jellyfish stings. These shirts can be worn by themselves, in tropical water, or under a wetsuit.
Rat hat
Ratcliffe diving helmet, Designed by Bob Ratcliffe (engineer), later produced by Oceaneering International. No longer in production.
ratio decompression

A technique for calculating decompression schedules for scuba divers engaged in deep diving without using dive tables, decompression software or a dive computer.
RDP

Subsection: Top, Ra, Re, Ri, Ro, Ru

== Re ==
rebreather

Underwater breathing apparatus which recycles most of the exhaled gas, removing carbon dioxide and topping up oxygen before the gas is breathed again.
reciprocating compressor

Compressor in which the volume of the compression chamber/s is cyclically changed by reversing linear motion. Usually a positive-displacement compressor that uses pistons driven by a crankshaft to deliver gases a raised pressure.
reclaim helmet

Diving helmet with a reclaim gas regulator allowing exhaled gas to be safely returned to the surface through an additional hose on the umbilical.
reclaim regulator

A diving regulator designed to safely return exhaled gas to a reclaim hose at lower than ambient pressure. Function is similar to a BIBS exhaust valve.
reclaim system

System for recovering helium based breathing gas used by divers and recycling it.
recompression

1. Subjecting a diver to pressure after an ascent from a dive as treatment for decompression illness. Preferably done in a recompression chamber, but occasionally done as in-water recompression.
2. Returning a diver to pressure as the first stage of surface decompression or omitted decompression procedure to prevent decompression sickness from developing.
recompression chamber

A hyperbaric chamber used to treat divers suffering from certain diving disorders such as decompression sickness.
recovery breathing

A technique used by freedivers on surfacing to reduce the risk of surface blackout. A partial exhalation is made, followed by a quick inhalation, then the diver closes the airway and pressurises for a few seconds as if about to cough. This is repeated a few times over the first 30 seconds or so on the surface. The aim is to keep thoracic pressure slightly raised to artificially raise arterial oxygen partial pressure or prevent it from dropping in the critical seconds until newly oxygenated blood can reach the brain, and thereby prevent surface blackout. This is the same technique used by pilots during high-g maneuvers, and by mountaineers at high altitude.
recreational diving

1. Recreational diving may be considered to be any underwater diving that is not occupational, professional, or commercial, in that the dive is fundamentally at the discretion of the diver, who dives either to their own plan, or to a plan developed in consensus with the other divers in the group, though dives led by a professional dive leader or instructor for non-occupational purposes are also legally classified as recreational dives in some legislations.
2. Recreational diving or sport diving is a type of diving that uses scuba equipment for the purpose of leisure and enjoyment. In some diving circles, the term "recreational diving" is used in contradistinction to "technical diving", a more demanding aspect of the sport which requires greater levels of training, experience and equipment. In other circles, technical diving is considered a subset of recreational diving as opposed to "professional diving", which is done as part of the diver's work.
Recreational Dive Planner

A no-stop decompression table developed by DSAT.
red tide

reduced gradient bubble model

A computationally intensive bubble model decompression algorithm developed by Bruce Wienke.
redundancy
redundant

Technical diving philosophy of ensuring that a spare or backup is available for any item of life-support equipment that would immediately endanger the diver if it were to fail.
redundant breathing gas supply

A breathing gas supply, carried by the diver, which is both suitable for the depths at which it may be breathed, and sufficient to allow the diver to make a safe and controlled return to the surface or other place where more breathing gas is available, which is not used during the dive, and is stored in one or more cylinders which are mot the one the diver is breathing from at any given time.
redundant equipment
duplicated or spare equipment carried by the diver or team to substitute for vital primary equipment in case of a malfunction. In some cases, such as cave lights, multiple redundancy may be desirable. A redundant breathing gas supply is the most common example.
reef

A ridge or shoal of rock, coral, or similar relatively stable material lying beneath the surface of a natural body of water.In recreational diving the term is also used for a slope or outcrop of similar material, or an artificial reef.
reef dive
reef diving
Dive at a reef site. Possibly the most common type of recreational dive site types. Coral reefs may be more popular as diving destinations, but rocky reefs are probably more globally widespread. Reef topography ranges from relatively flat to vertical walls and overhangs, which may include caves and other overhead environments.
reel
Mechanism used to store, deploy and recover long lengths of line at low tension.
reference temperature
Temperature at which a cylinder may be safely and legally filled to the nominal charging pressure without corrections.
regulator
1. A mechanism for controlling the output pressure of a high pressure gas supply.
2. As 1, with a demand valve (q.v.) incorporated which provides the diver with breathing gas at ambient pressure.
regulator changeout
regulator swap-out
Scuba emergency skill of swapping a correctly functioning regulator with one that is malfunctioning to gain access to breathing gas in a cylinder while underwater. Usually applied to side- or sling-mounted cylinders.
regulator freeze

Locking of the regulator mechanism caused by freezing of the water due to expansion cooling of the regulated air. Often causes the mechanism to lock open, causing free flow and further cooling.
reject criteria
rejection criteria
Features, states or conditions which are not acceptable.
repetitive dives

Any dive which is done while the tissues retain residual inert gas from a previous dive.
repet-up
Commercial diving term for a type of multilevel dive, in which the depth is decreased over elapsed time, with the purpose of allowing a longer useful dive time and minimising decompression time.
Repex

Method of estimating tolerable repetitive exposure to high partial pressure oxygen.
rescue tether

A short lanyard or strap carried by a surface supplied stand-by diver to be used to tether an unresponsive diver to the standby diver during a rescue. It is attached at one end to a D-ring on the stand-by diver's harness, and has a clip at the other end which may be secured to a D-ring on the casualty's harness to allow the rescuer the use of both hands during the return to the bell or surface.
reserve gas

Gas which is not intended to be used during the dive, and is reserved for contingencies.
reserve valve

Cylinder valve with a lever operated bypass valve to release the gas below reserve pressure.
residual gas
Gas remaining in a cylinder from the previous fill.
residual nitrogen

Nitrogen in excess of normal atmospheric saturation remaining in the diver's tissues after a dive.
residual nitrogen time

Time penalty in a repetitive dive equivalent to time at depth which would produce the residual nitrogen in the diver at the start of the dive.
residual pressure
Pressure of the gas remaining in a partly used cylinder from the previous fill.
resort dive

Recreational dive by an uncertified person under the paid direct supervision of a recreational diving instructor, after a very basic training session to learn the essential safety skills in confined water. Resort dives are limited to shallow water free of significant additional hazards. No certification is gained, though the dive may count towards an entry level certification if it follows closely. Compare with try-diving and Supervised diver.
respiratory minute volume

The volume of gas inhaled (inhaled minute volume) or exhaled (exhaled minute volume) from a person's lungs in one minute.
respiratory quotient

The ratio of carbon dioxide produced as a metabolic product to the oxygen consumed.
restriction
Section of a cave which is difficult to pass through due to lack of space. A minor restriction is too small for two divers to swim through together, a major restriction requires the diver to remove equipment to fit through.
revalidation
Certification that an item of equipment continues to be fit for service. Usually after passing the required periodic inspection and testing by an approved or authorised practitioner.
reverse block
Blockage of a sinus or eustachian tube preventing relatively high internal gas pressure from escaping.
reverse ear squeeze

Barotrauma of the ear caused by a middle ear gas space pressure greater than ambient pressure, or greater than the pressure in the external autitory canal, causing the eardrum to bulge outwards.
reverse jump
Procedure to cross a gap during an exit which allows the line to be retrieved without returning to the start point. In the event of a line break or removed primary reel, one diver holds the end of the search line at the break point, and the other searches for the other part of the broken line or the exit while laying line from the reel. When the original line or exit is found, the reel handler signals to the static diver with line pulls and the static diver swims in the direction of the line while the reel handler reels it in, recovering the line.
reverse profile
reverse dive profile
Repetitive dive which is deeper than the previous dive.
Multilevel dive in which a later level is deeper than an earlier level.
reverse sinus squeeze
Barotrauma of a sinus caused by a relatively high internal pressure.
RGBM

Subsection: Top, Ra, Re, Ri, Ro, Ru

== Ri ==
Rimbach system
System of touch contact signalling used in cave diving. Push forward = go, pull back = back up, squeeze = stop.
ring bungee

Length of shock cord with metal rings and a clip used to control the position of the top end of a sidemounted cylinder. Differs from a regular bungee in having the rings. A popular configuration is a bolt snap connected to a ring by a quick link, with a length of bungee from the ring to another quick link which is used to connect the assembly to a D-ring on the back of the harness. The bolt snap is clipped to the shoulder D-ring and the cylinder neck bolt snap is clipped to the ring.
rip current

A strong localised flow of water to seaward from near the shore, typically through the surf line
riser

A conduit that provides a temporary extension of a subsea oil well to a surface drilling facility
RMV

RNPL
Royal Naval Physiological Laboratory
RNT

Subsection: Top, Ra, Re, Ri, Ro, Ru

== Ro ==
rock boot
Footwear worn over a dry suit with integral socks suitable for walking on hard and rough surfaces and for wearing with fins. They can also be worn over neoprene socks with a wetsuit.
rock bottom gas management

Retention of a breathing gas reserve based on calculated values for the amount of gas required for a safe ascent from any point in the planned dive profile. Factors such as emergency supply of gas to a buddy, air consumption rates under stress and decompression gas requirements are considered in the calculations.
roll-off
Closing of a cylinder valve as a result of scraping contact between the valve knob and the overhead or other surroundings. The left hand knob is more likely to roll-off, closing the backup regulator in the standard twins configuration. Roll-off is an emergency if the diver does not have an immediately accessible alternative breathable gas supply.
ROV
ROUV
Remotely operated underwater vehicle – Tethered underwater mobile device operated by a remote crew.
roughneck
Member of the drilling crew who works under the direction of the driller to make or break connections as drillpipe is tripped in or out of the hole.
roustabout
Any unskilled manual laborer on the rigsite.

Subsection: Top, Ra, Re, Ri, Ro, Ru

== Ru ==
rule of thirds

Cave and wreck penetration breathing gas management convention where no more than one third of the gas in a cylinder may be used on the inward part of the dive, and the other two thirds is kept for exit: One third for the planned exit, and one third in case of an emergency.
run line
running line
Unreeling line under light tension while advancing. Usually in the context of laying a distance line.
run time
Time elapsed since the start of a dive.
running stop
A pause made during ascent to adjust the average ascent rate to the nominal value. For example a nominal ascent rate of 3 m per minute might use an actual ascent rate of about 5 m per minute and make a stop every 3m until the end of the current minute, resulting in a slightly stepped profile with an overall ascent rate corresponding to the nominal rate.
run time schedule
Decompression schedule and dive plan based on elapsed time from the start of the dive, All waypoints and events are specified in terms of elapsed time with start of descent at zero.
R-valve

A cylinder valve which limits the outflow by a calibrated orifice when in the "on" position.

== S ==
Contents: Top	A	B	C	D	E	F	G	H	I	J	K	L	M	N	O	P	Q	R	S	T	U	V	W	X	Y	Z	References

Subsection: Top, Sa, Se, Si, So, Su

== Sa ==
SAC rate

safe air
Term used for nitrox by American Nitrox Divers International (ANDI)
safe ascent depth
SAD
Shallowest depth to which a diver with a decompression obligation can ascend with acceptable risk of avoiding decompression sickness symptoms according to the decompression algorithm in use. Also called decompression ceiling
safe second
Obsolete term for octopus regulator.
safety-critical element
Item of equipment or process with the purpose to prevent or limit the consequences of a high risk hazard, that if realised, could result in the fatality or severe injury of one or more divers or support crew.
safety reel
Reel with relatively short line for use in an emergency, usually for searches to find a lost buddy or lost guideline or to jump a line break.
safety spool
Spool with relatively short line for use in an emergency, usually for searches to find lost buddy or lost guideline or to jump a line break.
safety stop

A voluntary (not required by the decompression schedule) additional decompression stop intended to further reduce risk of decompression sickness.
salt water aspiration syndrome

A reaction of the lungs to inhalation of a mist of salt water.
samba
Involuntary muscular contractions experienced by breathhold divers when approaching hypoxic blackout.
Sasuba
A shallow water recreational air line diving system using a scuba cylinder on a float towed by the diver.
saturation

Condition where the inert components of the breathing gas dissolved in a diver's tissues are in equilibrium with the gas in the lungs.
saturation diving

Diving mode where the divers remain pressurised for long enough for the slowest tissues to saturate with the inert components of the breathing gas, usually for periods of several days or weeks, and decompress only at the end of the period. Decompression from saturation is controlled only by the slowest tissue.
saturation diving system
saturation spread

The combination of equipment and services to operate a saturation diving project. It would include the closed diving bell, the accommodation modules, decompression chamber, life-support systems, gas storage and supply systems, pressurisation equipment, underwater breathing apparatus, and launch and recovery systems. In may also include a hyperbaric evacuation system.

Subsection: Top, Sa, Se, Si, So, Su

== Sc ==
SCBA
Self-contained breathing apparatus. The broader class of breathing apparatus carried by the user. Conventional usage usually refers to equipment which is not intended for underwater use, but scuba (originally self-contained underwater breathing apparatus) is technically a subclass of SCBA. Compare with breathing apparatus (BA) and underwater breathing apparatus (UBA).
schrader valve

Valve using a standard automotive tyre valve insert, common in low pressure inflation hose female connectors and BC inflation valves.
scientific diving

Diving for purposes of scientific research. The rules and constraints of scientific diving vary in different jurisdictions, but generally allow different options to mainstream commercial diving.
scooter
Diver propulsion vehicle used by scuba divers to increase range underwater.
scooter ring
D-ring on scuba harness used to attach to scooter tow line. Usually on front of the harness crotch strap.
SCR
1. Semi-closed circuit rebreather: A rebreather (q.v.) which either dumps part of each breath to the environment or continuously adds gas and dumps the excess. Compare with closed circuit rebreather (CCR) (q.v.).
2. Surface Consumption Rate - An alternative term with the same meaning as Surface Air Consumption (SAC) (q.v.). Not to be confused with Semi-closed Circuit Rebreather.
screw gate carabiner

A clip mechanism which can be locked in the closed position by turning a threaded barrel.
scrubber

Canister containing material (sorb) which chemically combines with carbon dioxide to remove it from the gas passed through the canister.
scuba
SCUBA

Self-contained underwater breathing apparatus. May be open or closed circuit.
scuba orienteering

Competitive underwater sport in which scuba divers attempt to swim a circuit marked by buoys, without surfacing, using compass navigation and mechanical distance measurement. Points are awarded for time and accuracy according to the specific course definition and length.
scuba replacement

Mobile surface-supplied diving equipment using portable gas storage cylinders for primary and reserve breathing gas supply. Preferred to scuba for commercial diving applications due to lower perceived risk compared to scuba, and because equipment and procedures are otherwise identical to surface supplied diving using compressors for air supply. Used when logistical constraints or air quality issues preclude use of a compressor.
S-drill
Safety drill. An air sharing exercise based on deploying the long hose primary regulator.

Subsection: Top, Sa, Se, Si, So, Su

== Se ==
search line

Cord used to indicate the transect for a search. The diver moves along the line, searching by sight or feel on one or both sides of the line. After the transect has been searched, the line is moved to the next transect. usually a short distance offset from the previous position, at a distance which depends on the visibility and the size of the target.
search pattern

Systematic procedure for covering the search area sufficiently to be reasonably sure of finding a given target if it is there. Several patterns are in general use for underwater searches, depending on the target, the terrain, and available facilities.
secondary drowning

A complication of aspiration of water or other fluids into the lungs.
secondary regulator

second stage

The part of a diving regulator which provides pressure reduction from intermediate pressure to ambient pressure on demand. Demand valve.
self-propelled hyperbaric lifeboat (SPHL)

A pressure vessel adapted for use as a means of hyperbaric evacuation, and fitted to a conventional lifeboat hull.
semi-dry snorkel

A snorkel topped with a splash guard, cap valve or wave deflector to reduce water ingress at the surface in choppy conditions.
semi-dry suit

A wet suit with wrist and ankle seals, and usually a more watertight zipper than usual, to reduce flushing of water through the suit.
separator

Device which facilitates the separation of liquid particles from the compressed gas, usually with a drain to periodically remove accumulated liquid from the system.
serial compartments

A decompression model based on the assumption that diffusion is the limiting mechanism of dissolved gas transport in the tissues, in which there is perfusion transport for one compartment, and diffusion between a series of compartments,
serial number

1. Number stamped on the cylinder by the manufacturer in the shoulder area which identifies the cylinder. In combination with the manufacturer’s identification this will be unique to the cylinder.
2. Character string, including number, marked on an item of equipment by the manufacturer to uniquely identify it.
setpoint
set-point
set point

Reference value for oxygen partial pressure in an electronically controlled closed circuit rebreather. The control system monitors the real time value of oxygen partial pressure in the breathing loop and automatically adjusts the composition by adding gas to keep the concentration between the upper and lower set-points.
SGC

Surface Gas Consumption

Subsection: Top, Sa, Se, Si, So, Su

== Sh ==
shallow water blackout
Loss of consciousness during a dive associated with occurrence at a shallow depth. Used for several different mechanisms, depending on context, therefore often leading to confusion.
1. See: Shallow-water blackout
Loss of consciousness caused by cerebral hypoxia towards the end of a breath-hold dive in water typically shallower than five metres (16 feet), when the swimmer does not necessarily experience an urgent need to breathe and has no other obvious medical condition that might have caused it.
2. See: Freediving blackout#Terminology and latent hypoxia
Loss of consciousness caused by cerebral hypoxia at the end of a deep breath-hold dive during the latter part of the ascent or immediately after surfacing due to lowered pO_{2} caused by reduction in ambient pressure, see also latent hypoxia.
3. Loss of consciousness while ascending on a rebreather due to sudden drop of pO_{2} in the breathing loop, usually associated with manual CCR and SCR.
shark pod
shark shield
Electrical device carried by a diver intended to repel sharks by electrical field pulses.
shock cord

shore diving
Diving from a shore entry point.
shot line

A rope between a float at the surface, and a sufficiently heavy weight holding the rope approximately vertical.

Subsection: Top, Sa, Se, Si, So, Su

== Si ==
sidemount

A scuba diving equipment configuration which has diving cylinders mounted alongside the diver, below the shoulders and along the hips, instead of on the back of the diver.
sidemount staging

The practice of using sidemount configuration (bungee loops and/or butt-plate rails) as a means for stowing stage/deco cylinders when otherwise diving in back-mounted scuba.
silent entry

An entry technique which minimises noise and splash, suitable for entry from a low platform. The diver sits with feet dangling over or into the water, turns their torso sideways, takes their weight on their hands, then swings off the surface and drops feet first into the water, slowed by their arms, and lets go with the hands when in the water.
silica gel

A desiccant filter medium used to adsorb water.
silt out

A situation when underwater visibility is rapidly reduced to zero, usually when a diver disturbs silt deposits.
silt screw

Device which is inserted into silt or sand to provide an anchor point, such as for a tie-off on a cave line. Silt screws are generally stakes made from small bore plastic (PVC) pipe with a sharpened end.
simultaneous operations
Two or more potentially clashing operations occurring, for example, at the same time and same location.
single point mooring

A loading buoy anchored offshore, that serves as a mooring point and interconnect for tankers loading or offloading gas or liquid products. SPMs are the link between geostatic subsea manifold connections and weathervaning tankers. They are capable of handling any size ship, even very large crude carriers (VLCC) where no alternative facility is available
sinkhole

A natural depression or hole in the Earth's surface caused by karst processes — the chemical dissolution of carbonate rocks – or suffosion processes for example in sandstone
sintered

Particulate or granular material bonded together by the application of pressure and sufficient heat to partially melt the surface of the particles and weld them together. The product is usually porous.
siphon
Place where water from a stream flows into the ground. also "swallow hole"
skandalopetra

A flat stone, usually of marble or granite, weighing between 8 and 14 kg, with rounded corners and edges, and tied to a rope, historically used by Greek sponge free-divers to assist descent. When the diver wishes to ascend the rope is used to signal the tender on the boat who then pulls in the rope. Currently skandalopetra diving is a competitive sport.
skin
skins

skip breathing

Breathing pattern where the diver holds each breath a while to conserve breathing gas, which can cause hypercapnia which can lead to headaches, aggravate nitrogen narcosis, increase risk of oxygen toxicity, and reduce physiological reserves in an emergency.
skirt
1. The body of a diving mask providing a watertight seal between the lens and the face.
2. The jacket and trouser waist flaps of a two-piece dry suit, which are overlapped and rolled together to provide a watertight seal.
S-lay

Method of laying undersea pipelines by welding the sections together on the lay barge and deploying them from the stern horizontally guided by a "stinger" - a structure that supports the pipe string to control its bend radius. The term refers to the shape of the bend in the pipe which transitions from roughly horizontal onboard where the sections are welded together, to angled downward over the stinger, to roughly horizontal again as it settles on the seabed.
slate

Rigid hard plastic tablet used for writing messages or notes underwater. Compare with wet notes. Usually with a slightly roughened surface to accept pencil marks.
sling cylinder
sling mount

Independent cylinder with its own regulator carried clipped to the harness at the side of the diver. Compare with sidemount, and stage cylinder.
slingshot valve

A cylinder valve with two valved outlets angled to left and right of the centreline
slob knob
Flexible extension used for operating valve knobs on a manifold
SMB

snag line
Line used for underwater search intended to snag on the target. May be dragged by boats or by divers. May be weighted if dragged over a smooth bottom.
snap shackle

A clip connector mechanism which locks when closed, can be operated without tools, and can usually be released under load.
snoopy loop

A heavy duty elastic band made from a slice of inner tube.
snoot

Accessory for a photographic strobe which limits illumination of the subject to a very small area, leaving the background dark, and virtually eliminating backscatter.
snorkel

Tube with a bend and mouthpiece used for breathing air from above the water surface when the wearer's mouth and nose are submerged.
snorkeling
snorkelling

Swimming at the surface of the water while breathing through a snorkel. the snorkeller is almost always equipped with a diving mask or swim goggles, and usually swimfins.
snorkel keeper

Device to hold a snorkel in place at the side of a diving mask by fixing it to the mask strap.
Snuba

Snuba is a portmanteau of "snorkel" and "scuba", referring to a proprietary recreational surface supplied underwater breathing system supplied from a cylinder mounted on a small raft towed by the diver.

Subsection: Top, Sa, Se, Si, So, Su

== So ==
solo diving

The practice of scuba diving alone, without a dive buddy or in-water standby diver.
sonic orifice

Metering device to provide constant mass flow of a gas.
sorb

Carbon dioxide absorbent material used in rebreather or life support system scrubber to remove carbon dioxide from the breathing gas so it may be recycled.

Subsection: Top, Sa, Se, Si, So, Su

== Sp ==
speargun

Hunting weapon for shooting fish underwater which propels a barbed steel spear a short distance forward using stored energy from stretched rubber strips or compressed air behind a captive piston.
spearo
Slang term for breathhold spearfisher.
speech unscrambler

An electronic device to render words spoken in a hyperbaric helium environment intelligible.
speleogen

Dissolution features in bedrock.
speleothem

Also known as a cave formation: A secondary mineral deposit formed in a cave.
SPG

SPHL

spider

Mask strap system for full-face masks with three or more straps. (commonly 5)
spitcock

A valve in the side of a copper diving helmet which could be used by the diver to suck in a mouthful of seawater to spit onto the inside face of a viewport to wash off condensation droplets to improve their view.
SPM

spool
1. See: Distance line#Spools
Circular device for storing line, comprising a short tubular section with a relatively large flange at each end. No moving parts. A small, compact, economical and reliable alternative to a reel for relatively short lines.
2. Short, straight section of pipe or tube with a flange at each end. Also a wider range of short weldments for various purposes as components of a piping system assembled from sections of pipe, flanges and other fittings.
spread
The topside base for (usually) surface supplied commercial diving operations. Also "air spread" and "saturation spread" (q.v.) depending on the diving mode.
spring

Place where a concentrated flow of water emerges from the ground.
spring strap

Fin strap using a stainless steel spring to secure the fin to the foot.
spring suit
A wetsuit that covers the torso and has short sleeves and long or short legs
spud
spud pile
1. A vertical steel shaft like a pile, temporarily or permanently driven into the seabed to maintain the lateral position of a barge or structure
2. A short rigid column driven into the ground and then removed to make a hole to initiate driving a pile, or to break through a hard layer.
spud can
The foot on a leg of a Jack-up rig oil platform designed to spread the load so that the rig does not sink too deeply into the sea-bed. Commonly a wide shallow conical disc structure to support the weight, with a penetrating central tip to resist lateral sliding, though details vary.
spud well
spud pocket
A vertical sleeve for a spud that is attached to a spud barge to support and guide a mooring spud on a barge.
SPUMS
South Pacific Underwater Medicine Society
square profile

Dive profile where the diver descends continuously to the maximum depth and stays there for the duration of the dive before ascending directly at a stedy rate to the surface or first decompression stop. This profile provides worst case exposure for gas absorption by the body tissues for a given depth and bottom time, and is assumed for most decompression planning using decompression tables.
squeeze

Injury or discomfort caused by increase of ambient pressure above the pressure in a gas space in contact with the diver's body, causing a pressure difference tending to squeeze body tissues into the lower pressure volume of the gas space. A cause of several kinds of barotrauma.
SSDE
Surface-supply diving equipment.

Subsection: Top, Sa, Se, Si, So, Su

== St ==
stab

Type of subsea connector
stabiliser jacket
stabilizer jacket
stab jacket

stage
1. See: diving stage
2. See: stage cylinder
3. Part of a dive in which gas is breathed from a specific stage cylinder
stage cylinder
stage bottle

1. A cylinder used for a stage of a long penetration dive, also known as drop cylinder when it is placed on the distance line to be collected on the return. The term may be used for the cylinder and rigging with or without a regulator
2. Also generically and loosely used to refer to decompression gas cylinders, bailout cylinders, travel gas, or bottom gas carried as sling cylinders (q.v.)
staged decompression

The practice of making decompression stops.
stage-drop

Placing a stage cylinder at the distance line for planned later use.
stage gas
1. The gas intended for use during a specific stage of a dive.
2. Breathing gas carried in a stage cylinder
stage-only diving

The use of standard deco/stage cylinder configuration, without back-mounted cylinders, on an otherwise standard, or partially modified tec/rec BCD. The cylinders are attached to waist and shoulder D-Rings by direct bolt-snap, and no bungee cord is used in the upper attachment. Similar to, and may be confused with sidemount
stage rigging

The clips, straps and cords fastened to a scuba cylinder which are used to mount it as a stage cylinder.
stage set

A scuba set to be used during a specific stage of a dive. Often rigged and carried as a sling mount or sidemount set. Sometimes dropped at the end of the outward leg of the stage, and retrieved on the return to complete the return leg of the same stage.
standard diving dress
standard dress

Early free flow surface supplied diving equipment using a heavy rubberised canvas suit, copper helmet and corselet, and weighted boots. Still in use in some parts of the world.
standard diving helmet

The copper and brass free-flow diving diving helmet used with standard diving dress.
standard operating procedure

Procedure compiled by an organisation prescribing the processes to be followed when performing specified tasks.
standby diver
stand-by diver

(Professional) diver functioning as a safety backup to the working diver. Often on the surface at the dive control point, but ready to enter the water at very short notice on the instruction of the supervisor. In bell diving the stand-by diver would be the bellman.
static apnea
static apnoea

Underwater breath-holding without changing location
static lung load

The pressure difference between gas inside the lungs and the gas inside the mouthpiece of the breathing apparatus or inside the helmet. In most rebreathers this is the hydrostatic pressure at depth of the counterlung. In ballasted bellows counterlungs the pressure is modified by the force exerted by the ballast weight.
steamer
A full one piece Wetsuit that covers the torso and the full length of the arms and legs.
stinger
An overboard extension at the stern of an offshore pipe lay barge used to provide additional support at the over bend of an S-lay during offshore construction.
stop

storage depth

Depth pressure in a saturation system at which divers live between compression and decompression when not locked out on a dive.
stride entry

Entry technique from a platform a small to moderate distance above the water surface, which is suitable to stand on before entry. The diver faces the water and steps out with the leading foot, pushing away from the platform with the back foot, and drops into the water while maintaining a vertical posture until fully submerged. It is usually advisable to hold loose equipment against the body, particularly the mask and DV, and if there is no crotch strap, the buoyancy compensator is held to prevent it riding up the torso on impact. The feet can be brought together after initial impact to limit depth of immersion in moderately shallow water, by applying fin thrust downwards.
stroke
Derogatory term used by DIR zealots to describe divers who do not follow DIR procedures and use DIR approved equipment and configurations.

Subsection: Top, Sa, Se, Si, So, Su

== Su ==
subcutaneous emphysema

Gas under the skin resulting from lung overpressure injury.
submersible compression chamber
submersible decompression chamber

A closed diving bell, used for transferring divers under pressure to and from the worksite. Particularly if used for decompression.
submersible pressure gauge

Gauge attached to the first stage regulator and used to monitor pressure remaining in the diving cylinder.
suicide clip
Derogatory term for clip mechanisms which are capable of clipping onto a line or other object without the active and intentional intervention of a user.
suit blowup

Excessive inflation of a dry suit leading to uncontrolled ascent.
sump

A passage in a cave that is submerged under water.
sump pack
Tough waterproof bag with watertight seal used to carry dry equipment in caves, including through water filled passages.
superoxide scrubber

Rebreather scrubber which not only removes carbon dioxide from the exhaled air, but also replenishes the oxygen by chemical reaction with potassium superoxide.
supersaturation

A temporary and thermodynamically unstable condition of a solvent containing more dissolved gas than it can hold in solution over the long term for the prevailing conditions. A necessary condition for bubble growth in decompression sickness.
supersaturation limit
The theoretical pressure ratio between tissue gas concentration and ambient pressure above which the probability of bubble formation is unacceptably high.
Supervised Diver

EN 14153-1 / ISO 24801-1 standard competence for recreational scuba diver. The level 1 "Supervised Diver" has sufficient knowledge, skill and experience to dive, in open water, to a recommended maximum depth of 12 m, which do not require in-water decompression stops, under the direct supervision of a dive leader, in groups of up to four level 1 scuba divers per dive leader provided the dive leader is capable of establishing physical contact with all level 1 scuba divers at any point during the dive, only when appropriate support is available at the surface, and under conditions that are equal or better than the conditions where they were trained.
supervisor

supply lock

Small lock on a saturation life support habitat for transfer of relatively small items.
support diver

A voluntary member of a technical diving team who acts as a stand-by diver to the primary dive team, or provides in-water logistical support for a dive.
SurD

surf

The mass or line of broken water formed by waves breaking on a shore or reef
surface air consumption rate
A measure of air consumption in units of pressure over time, usually psi/minute, adjusted to surface pressure, used to estimate air endurance of a cylinder of specific size. Useful for those who work in imperial units. SAC has a constant value for a given diver and represents gas used on the surface at rest. Surface gas consumption (SGC) is an alternative term referring to alternative breathing gas mixtures. Occasionally also termed surface consumption rate (SCR)
surface compression chamber
A hyperbaric chamber for surface use for routine decompression or therapeutic recompression.
surface decompression

A procedure in which some or all of the staged decompression obligation is done in a decompression chamber immediately after surfacing instead of in the water.
surface detection aids
Equipment, such as flags, surface marker buoys, flares, EPIRBs, radio beacons mirrors, and whistles, carried by divers to maintain contact with dive boats or attract rescue when lost at sea.
surface dive
A dive made from floating at the surface of the water to some depth below the surface, which can be executed headfirst in pike or tuck position or feet first
surface equivalent volume

Gas volume calculated as expanded to surface pressure.
surface interval

The time spent by a diver at surface pressure after a dive during which inert gas which was still present at the end of the dive is further eliminated from the tissues.
surface marker buoy

A buoy towed by a diver to indicate the diver's position to people at the surface.
surface orientated diving
Any diving operation in which the diver is decompressed to surface pressure after the dive. Compare to saturation diving .
SURG
Southern Underwater Research Group. An organisation based in Cape Town, which publishes marine ecology field guides, dive travel guides and underwater maps.
surge

Reciprocating water movement parallel to the bottom surface caused by the passing of a wave overhead, by analogy with the transient linear motion of a ship in the direction of travel also called surge.
sustained load cracking

The development of cracks in a material subjected over long term to static stress significantly less than the yield stress. There is a low but significant risk of this mode of failure in pressure vessels of AA6351 aluminium alloy.
swell

A series of surface gravity waves that is not generated by the local wind.
swim line
Line used to space divers across the search area for a swim line search. Each diver holds the line at a distance from the previous diver of somewhat less than twice the visibility distance. The line is used to keep the divers spaced evenly across the search area while swimming perpendicular to the line.
swimthrough
swim-through
A submerged arch or short tunnel that a diver can swim through without needing to remove equipment. It is usually possible to see natural light at the far end in good visibility and illumination. Usually refers to a natural formation. Technically an overhead environment, but usually with no risk of getting lost, though entrapment may be possible.

== Sources ==
- Staff (August 2016). Guidance for diving supervisors IMCA D 022 (Revision 1 ed.). London, UK: International Marine Contractors Association.
- US Navy (2008). US Navy Diving Manual, 6th revision. United States: US Naval Sea Systems Command. Archived from the original on 2 May 2008.
