= Glossary of underwater diving terminology: A–C =

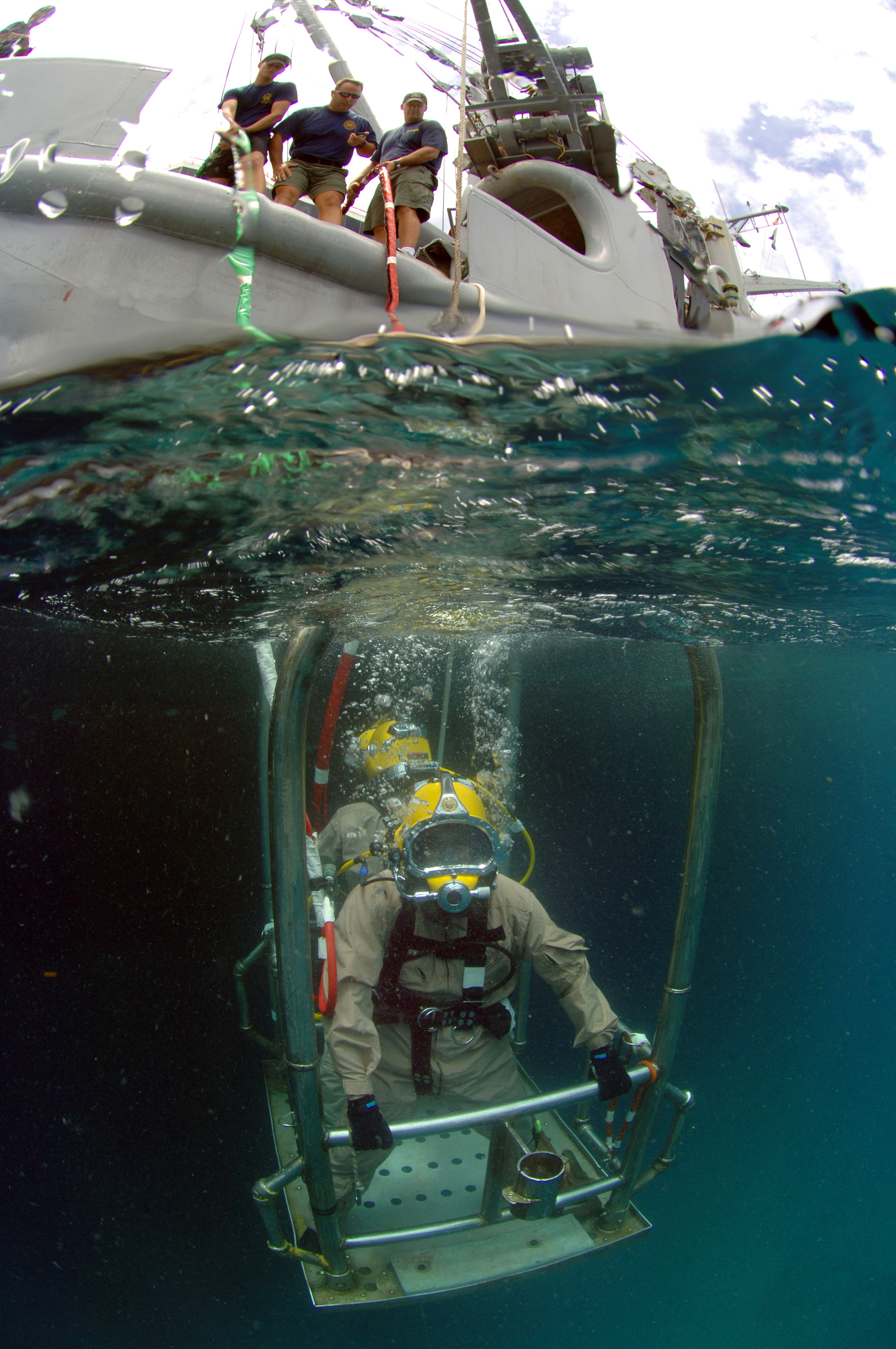
Surface-supplied divers riding a stage to the underwater workplace

This is a glossary of technical terms, jargon, diver slang and acronyms used in underwater diving. The definitions listed are in the context of underwater diving. There may be other meanings in other contexts.

The appeal of underwater diving as a human activity is usually associated with the view into an underwater environment that is typically inaccessible in daily life on land. Practitioners submerge below the surface of the water for a range of purposes, such as recreation, underwater photography, exploration of marine biology and nautical archaeology, search for shipwrecks, and other types of research.

Underwater divers may use no equipment at all, or a wide range of equipment which may include breathing apparatus, environmental protective clothing, aids to vision, communication, propulsion, maneuverability, buoyancy and safety equipment, and tools for the task at hand.

Many of the terms are in general use by English speaking divers from many parts of the world, both amateur and professional, and using any of the modes of diving. Others are more specialised, variable by location, mode, or professional environment. There are instances where a term may have more than one meaning depending on context, and others where several terms refer to the same concept, or there are variations in spelling. A few are loan-words from other languages.

There are five sub-glossaries, listed here. The tables of content should link between them automatically:

- Glossary of underwater diving terminology: A–C
- Glossary of underwater diving terminology: D–G
- Glossary of underwater diving terminology: H–O
- Glossary of underwater diving terminology: P–S
- Glossary of underwater diving terminology: T–Z

== A ==
Contents: Top	A	B	C	D	E	F	G	H	I	J	K	L	M	N	O	P	Q	R	S	T	U	V	W	X	Y	Z	References

Subsection: Top, Aa, Ae, Ai, Ao, Au

== Aa ==
AA6061

Aluminium alloy used for manufacture of new diving cylinders exclusively since mid 1988 as it is not susceptible to sustained load cracking.
AA6351

Aluminium alloy 6351 is subject to sustained load cracking and requires periodical eddy current testing to identify crack development at an early stage. Not used for new cylinder manufacture since 1988, but many cylinders of this alloy are still in service.
ABLJ

absolute pressure

Total static pressure at the reference point: Pressure relative to vacuum.
accelerated decompression

Increased rate of outgassing by using a breathing gas with a lower content of inert gases
ACD

A-clamp adaptor

A-clamp fitting
A-clamp valve

activated carbon
activated charcoal

A filter medium used to remove oil, water, and odours from breathing gas.
active addition

System for semi-closed circuit rebreather feed gas addition in which gas is added to the breathing circuit by a mechanism, regardless of current volume, and excess gas is vented to keep the loop volume within limits. Compare with passive addition
active heave compensation

Automated system using inertial feedback to adjust lifting cable length to compensate for the movement of the lifting point, to minimise vertical movement of the load.
adaptive diving

Scuba diving using techniques modified to compensate for disabilities
ADAS

ADCI

adjustable buoyancy life jacket

An early style of combination buoyancy compensator and inflatable life jacket worn on the chest and round the neck.
ADV
1. See: automatic diluent valve
2. See: automatic dump valve
Subsection: Top, Aa, Ae, Ai, Ao, Au

== Ae ==
A-frame

Part of a launch and recovery system. A gantry crane, sheer-legs or davit structure for launching and recovering diving bells, diving stages, anchors, or large ROVs. Usually deployed by hydraulic rams which luff the frame over the deck or overboard as required. The load is hoisted and lowered by cables from the top of the frame.
AGE

aggressive decompression

Decompression schedule tending to shorter overall decompression time for a given pre-ascent dive profile, accepting increased risk of decompression sickness to reduce the overall ascent time.
Subsection: Top, Aa, Ae, Ai, Ao, Au

== Ai ==
air dome
1. A section of cave which traps air or other gas at the top. This gas is not directly connected to the atmosphere.
{{defn|2=2|1=The upper part of an open diving bell which can be filled with air for divers to breathe, also known as a canopy.
air integration

Feature of some dive computers to measure cylinder pressure using an integral pressure gauge connected by HP hose to the regulator first stage, or receive data from one or more remote pressure transducers fitted to the HP port of a regulator, and display the pressure on the screen. Other features may also be available using the data.
airlift

A device based on a steeply rising pipe, used by divers to suck small objects, sand and mud from the sea bed and to transport the resulting debris upwards and away from its source. Air is injected into the lower end of the pipe and the rising bubbles entrain water and cause an upward flow which draws the material from the bottom along.
airline
air line

Simple low pressure hose carrying breathing air from a surface supply to a diver.
airline diving

Surface-supplied diving where the breathing air is supplied to the diver by a simple hose. The diver usually breathes through a mouth held demand valve.
air top
air top-up

1. Completing a planned breathing gas mix by topping up the cylinder with compressed air to a calculated pressure.
2. Topping up a partly used breathing gas mix with compressed air, providing a different mixture which is analysed after the fill.
algal bloom

A rapid increase or accumulation in the population of algae (typically microscopic) in an aquatic system. Some blooms may be recognized by discoloration of the water resulting from the high density of pigmented cells. Visibility can severely deteriorate over a period of hours to days.
ALP
Articulated Loading Platform, a type of single buoy mooring consisting of a buoyant upper structure with a lattice leg linked by an articulating joint to a mooring.
alternative air source

A secondary supply of air or other breathing gas used by a diver in an emergency. See also emergency gas supply (EGS)
alternobaric vertigo

Dizziness caused by different internal pressure in the middle ears.
altitude diving

Diving at a location where the water surface is at an altitude which requires modification of decompression schedules. (more than about 300 m (980 ft) above sea level.
ambient pressure

Pressure of the local surroundings.
anoxia

Tissues completely lacking in oxygen.
anoxic
Environment or gas completely lacking in oxygen.
ANSTI machine
ANSTI breathing simulator
The ANSTI breathing simulator is a machine used to measure the performance of underwater breathing apparatus under pressure.
Subsection: Top, Aa, Ae, Ai, Ao, Au

== Ao ==
AODC
Association of Offshore Diving Contractors, one of the predecessors to the International Marine Contractors Association (IMCA).
aphasia

An impairment of language ability which may range from having difficulty remembering words to being completely unable to speak, read, or write.
apnea
1. Suspension of breathing, breath-hold.
2. Freediving.
appropriate breathing mix
appropriate breathing gas

A breathing gas mixture that is suitable in composition and temperature, and of adequate pressure, having regard to the system and equipment used in the diving operations, the work undertaken in those operations, and the conditions and depth at which they are to be carried out.
Aqua-lung
Aqua-Lung

Self contained open circuit demand underwater breathing equipment consisting of a diving cylinder and diving regulator.
arterial bubble model

Decompression model in which the filtering capacity of the lung is assumed to have a threshold radius of the size of a red blood cell and sufficiently small decompression bubbles can pass to the arterial side, especially during the initial phase of ascent.
arterial gas embolism

Blockage of an artery by a gas bubble. A possible consequence of lung overpressure injury and decompression sickness.
articulated loading platform

AR vest
A waistcoat (vest) style harness of heavy cloth with strong adjustable webbing straps so that the diver can not slide out under any reasonably foreseeable circumstance.
ascent

Part of the dive profile where the diver is moving upwards towards the surface. An ascent may be interrupted by stops (q.v.), when the diver maintains a functionally constant depth for the purpose of decompression, and pulls (q.v.), during which periods there is consistently upwards movement (minor variations in the scale of a few seconds are generally ignored).
ascent rate

The rate at which depth is reduced at the end of a dive. An important component of decompression.
A.S.S.E.T.
Association of SCUBA Service Engineers and Technicians.
Association of Diving Contractors International

A non-profit organization to promote commercial diving, and establish and encourage observance of safe standards for commercial diving.
ATA
ata
atmospheres absolute

Unit of absolute pressure equivalent to standard atmospheric pressure.
atmospheric diving suit
ADS

A small one-man articulated submersible of anthropomorphic form which resembles a suit of armour, with elaborate pressure joints to allow articulation while maintaining an internal pressure of one atmosphere.
attack swimmer

attendant

Subsection: Top, Aa, Ae, Ai, Ao, Au

== Au ==
Australian Diver Accreditation Scheme

An international commercial and occupational diver certification scheme based in Australia.
auto-closure device
automatic closure device

A mechanism for automatically closing off the inlet opening of a regulator first stage when it is disconnected from a cylinder to seal it against ingress of contamination.
automatic diluent valve

A demand valve set into the breathing loop of a rebreather to inject diluent gas into the loop when the loop volume falls and there is not enough gas for inhalation.
automatic dump valve
Adjustable spring-loaded overpressure valve with manual override used on a constant volume dry suit to automatically discharge excess suit inflation gas as it expands during ascent, thereby maintaining a nearly constant volume and buoyancy of the suit.
Autonomous diver

EN 14153-2 / ISO 24801-2 standard competence for recreational scuba diver. The level 2 "Autonomous diver" has sufficient knowledge, skill and experience to make dives, in open water, which do not require in-water decompression stops, to a recommended maximum depth of 20 m with other scuba divers of the same level, only when appropriate support is available at the surface, and under conditions that are equal or better than the conditions in which they were trained, without supervision of a scuba instructor, unless they have additional training or are accompanied by a dive leader.
available gas

Breathing gas available from a cylinder after taking into account ambient pressure and the pressure needed for correct function of the delivery system at a useful flow rate. This may also take into account a reserve allocation.

== B ==
Contents: Top	A	B	C	D	E	F	G	H	I	J	K	L	M	N	O	P	Q	R	S	T	U	V	W	X	Y	Z	References

Subsection: Top, Ba, Be, Bi, Bo, Bu

== Ba ==
back gas
Breathing gas carried by a scuba diver in back mounted cylinders. Generally the primary breathing gas for the bottom or longest sector of a dive.
back kick
backward kick

A finning technique for moving backwards. Not an easy, powerful or elegant kick, but useful in many situations. The fins are angled outwards in opposite directions with the legs straight, then swept upwards and towards the diver by bending the knees in the power stroke. The knees may move downwards a bit at the same time by bending at the hips for stability. The return stroke feathers the fins by pointing them backwards in line with the body axis, to reduce forward thrust until the legs are straight again
backmount
back mount
The practice of carrying a scuba set on the back of the diver, supported by a harness, backplate or stabilisor jacket BCD. Compare with sidemount
backpack
A rigid or semi-rigid structure similar in function to a backplate, usually made of moulded plastic, but sometimes of metal, used either as a stiffener and reinforcement for a jacket style buoyancy compensator, or as the basis of a scuba harness independent of a buoyancy compensator. The backpack supports and stabilises the scuba cylinder on the diver's back.
backplate

A plate, normally made from metal, which rests against the diver’s back, and to which the primary scuba cylinders are attached. Held to the body by harness straps over the shoulders and round the waist. Sometimes also crotch straps and chest straps. Usually used with a back inflation buoyancy compensator.
backscatter

Light reflected back towards the diver or camera by suspended particles in the water.
backup light
Dive light carried as a spare to be used in case of failure of the primary light.
backup regulator

A second complete scuba regulator connected to a cylinder or manifolded twin set. Compare with octopus regulator.
backward roll
backward roll entry
back roll entry

Water entry method in which the seated diver rolls backwards off the side of the boat, allowing the scuba cylinders to strike the water first.
bailout block
A gas switching block specifically intended for connection of a bailout set to the main gas supply (which may be scuba or surface supply) which allows the diver to switch from main gas supply to emergency gas supply while continuously using the same mouthpiece, regulator second stage, full face mask or helmet. A bailout block is generally used on open circuit breathing apparatus, the equivalent function on a rebreather is provided by a bailout valve (BOV). The bailout block may be mounted on the side of a diving helmet or full-face mask, or may be mounted in a convenient place on the diver's harness, and includes a bailout valve, used to select the gas source, and one or more non-return valves to ensure that the emergency gas supply is directed only to the diver.
bailout bottle
bailout cylinder

A scuba cylinder carried by an underwater diver for use as an emergency supply of breathing gas in the event of a primary gas supply failure.
bailout set
bailout system

An independent breathing gas supply carried by a diver for use in case of failure of the main gas supply. Usually consists of a bailout cylinder with a first stage regulator, and either a second stage regulator or connected to a bailout block or bailout valve (q.v.) A submersible pressure gauge is also usually provided.
bailout valve
1. Also: "integrated open-circuit regulator" An open circuit demand valve built into a rebreather mouthpiece, or other part of the breathing loop, which can be isolated while the diver is using the rebreather to recycle breathing gas, and opened at the same time as isolating the breathing loop when the diver bails out to open circuit.
2. A valve which opens the gas supply from the bailout cylinder of a surface supplied diver, used in case of surface gas failure, usually mounted on the side of a diving helmet or full-face mask, or on a manifold block on the diver's harness.
baited remote underwater video

A system for assessing fish populations using video cameras to record fish attracted to a bait canister.
balanced regulator

Regulator designed to provide a consistent demand effort not affected by cylinder gas pressure or depth.
band mask
bandmask

A heavy duty full-face mask with many of the characteristics of a lightweight demand helmet. In structure it is the front section of a lightweight helmet from above the faceplate to below the demand valve and exhaust ports, including the bailout block and communications connections on the sides. This rigid frame is attached to a neoprene hood by a metal clamping band, hence the name.
bands

bar

Metric unit of pressure commonly used in diving, equal to 100 kiloPascal, and nearly equal to standard atmospheric pressure.
barodontalgia

Tooth pain caused by pressure change.
barotrauma

Injury caused by pressure difference.
baseline

1. Also: "tank factor". Numeric value computed for a cylinder or manifolded set that relates volume and pressure in the imperial system of units. Computed by dividing nominal capacity (cubic feet) by cylinder working pressure (psi) to express cubic feet of volume per psi of fill pressure (sometimes multiplied by 100 to give cubic feet per 100 psi). Used to convert cylinder pressure to free gas volume.
2. A line that is a base for measurement or for construction; see datum (calculations or comparisons)
3. A data set which is a point of reference (engineering or science) for later data.
basket

BAT wing
Buoyancy and trim wing. A back mounted buoyancy compensator cell used with sidemount harness. The buoyancy volume is mostly over the lower back.
BC
BCD

BCD blowup
Uncontrolled buoyant ascent caused by inability to release gas from the buoyancy compensator faster than it expands due to pressure reduction of ascent.

Subsection: Top, Ba, Be, Bi, Bo, Bu

== Be ==
beach master

A person on the beach who records when divers enter and exit the water. Typically used during recreational scuba training to keep track of the students, watch the gear, and provide assistance when required.
bell
1. See: diving bell
2. Short tug on a lifeline, used in pairs, for signalling purposes. (see "pull" for comparison)
bell bounce dive
bell-bounce dive

Surface oriented diving operation in which the divers are transported in and deployed from a closed bell, and are either decompressed in the bell at the surface or transferred under pressure to a deck decompression chamber for decompression.
bell cursor

Mechanism or structure for guiding and constraining the motion of a bell when in the close vicinity of the deployment platform to improve handling in bad weather.
bell diving
1. Any diving operation in which the divers travel in or work from a diving bell
2. Diving operations in which divers are transported in and deployed from a closed bell, either as a surface oriented (bell bounce) or saturation dive.
bell harness
A safety harness made of strong webbing, which is fastened around a diver over the exposure suit, and allows the diver to be lifted without risk of falling out of the harness.
bellman

Standby diver deployed in the diving bell
bellows ratio
The swept volume ratio between the inner and outer bellows of the counterlung of a passive addition semi-closed rebreather.
bell run
The part of a bell dive operation from bell lock-off to bell lock-on (from and back to the life support system)
bell stage
A framework extending below a closed bell which keeps the base of the pressure vessel off the bottom sufficiently to provide clearance for the divers to use the bottom hatch when the bell is resting on the bottom or on the clump weight.
bell umbilical

The combined supply and return hoses and cables for life-support, power and communications between a diving bell and the support platform
belt slide
belt slider

Hardware item with two parallel slots which is fitted to harness or weightbelt webbing to prevent other components such as D-rings and weights from sliding along the webbing.
benign water
benign conditions

Sometimes also referred to as confined water. Environments of low risk, where it is extremely unlikely or impossible for the diver to get lost or entrapped, or be exposed to hazards other than the basic underwater environment.
bent D-ring
A D-ring which has been bent about 45° near the straight section on both sides, forcing it to project slightly from the harness when pushed to one side, allowing easier attachment of clips.
bends
Decompression sickness: Injury caused by bubble formation in the body tissues after hyperbaric exposure.

Subsection: Top, Ba, Be, Bi, Bo, Bu

== Bi ==
BIBS

bifin
bi-fin
bi fin
Swimfin worn on one foot. One of a pair. The term is usually used in the context of freediving and finswimming to distinguish the style having a blade mounted on a single foot pocket from monofins, which have a single blade and two foot pockets. In scuba diving, surface-supplied diving and snorkelling they are usually referred to simply as fins or swimfins.
Billy ring
Three D-rings welded together along their straight sides so that one is perpendicular to the other two, which lie on the same plane. This uses the two flat rings to maintain the third in an upright position when mounted on harness webbing, allowing it to be more easily accessed to clip on stage cylinders. Named after Billy Deans.
bioprene
Diver and swimmer slang for subcutaneous fat, which provides some thermal insulation.
BK hook
B.K. hook
BK safety hook
A type of safety lifting hook which is held closed when under load by a lever system where the weight of the load holds the bill of the hook against the safety latch.
black-water diving

Diving in mid-water at night where the bottom is out of diving range.
blending stick

Mixing tube in which gases are continuously mixed prior to intake by a compressor, usually at atmospheric pressure. Usually refers to manufacture of nitrox from air with added oxygen, but also used for trimix. Gas mixture is usually continuously analysed at the exit of the blending stick to monitor composition.
blind traverse
Passing through a cave from one entrance to a different exit which the diver has not used before.
block adaptor
Screw-in adaptor fitting which is fitted to a 200/240 bar DIN pillar valve to allow connection of a yoke regulator or filling whip.
blowdown
1. Procedure of pressurising a diving chamber or saturation habitat.
2. Procedure of driving water out of the bottom of an open diving bell by displacing it with air or other breathing gas at ambient pressure.
blowout

Uncontrolled release of crude oil and/or natural gas from a well after pressure control systems have failed.
blowout preventer

A large, specialized valve used to seal, control and monitor oil and gas wells. Generally operated remotely by hydraulic ram.
blowout preventer stack
An assembly of several blowout preventer rams which may be used to shut off a well.
blue hole

A sink hole in a lake or the sea that is often the entrance to a cave. Blue holes in the sea are subject to tides so that their flows regularly reverse.
blue-water diving

Underwater diving in mid-water where the bottom is not visible and is out of diving range.

Subsection: Top, Ba, Be, Bi, Bo, Bu

== Bo ==
bolt snap

A metal connector comprising a hook with a spring-loaded axial sliding rod gate which must be manually retracted to allow the hook to be clipped onto something or removed. May be single- or double-ended, and if single-ended is usually fitted with a swivel ring opposite the jaws.
bomb
Commercial diver slang for high pressure gas storage cylinder of around 50 litres water capacity, also known as a "J".
bommie
Australian term for a coral mound or small, usually isolated reef, or coral head. From the Aboriginal word "bombara".
bondage wing

Derogatory term for bungee wing based on fetishist terminology.
bonnet
The upper part of a copper helmet which encloses the diver's head and is sealed to the lower part or corselet (q.v.)
booster
booster pump

Machine used to increase pressure of a gas. Usually refers to the case where inlet pressure is above ambient pressure already.
BOP

BOP stack

bottom gas
The gas breathed by the diver at the deepest part of the dive. Compare with travel gas and decompression gas.
bottom time
Time used in calculating decompression obligation from decompression tables. For most tables this is defined as the elapsed time from starting the descent to starting the final ascent to the surface, excluding ascent and decompression time.
bottom timer
Device used to measure and record the total time spent underwater during a dive. They do not generally only record bottom time (q.v.).
bottom out
A rebreather counterlung becoming completely deflated during inhalation.
bounce dive
bounce diving
1. Also: "surface oriented dive" : In commercial diving, bounce diving is the alternative to saturation diving. Any dive where the diver is decompressed directly after the dive.
2. In recreational diving, a bounce dive is a descent to maximum depth and then a direct ascent back to the surface with minimal bottom time, in a dive profile resembling a spike.
BOV

bowline

Knot used to form a secure, non-slipping loop at the end of a line.
Boyle's law

Relationship between pressure and volume at constant temperature in an ideal gas.
breakdown room
An area in a cave where a large amount of material has fallen from the overhead.
breakout
The point at which an object being lifted which is partly embedded in the bottom sediments overcomes the adhesion of the sediments and the force required to lift it drops rapidly to the apparent weight of the object.
breakthrough
The failure of a rebreather scrubber to remove all the carbon dioxide in the gas passing through the absorbent material.
breastplate

breathing gas
breathing mixture

Gas supplied to the diver to breathe, either directly to the diver or to the hyperbaric environment of the diving bell, dive chamber or saturation habitat. Colloquially just "gas" or "mix".
breathing hose
Large bore hose carrying the breathing gas in a rebreather breathing loop or a twin-hose demand valve.
breathing loop
The gas flow path in a rebreather comprising the diver's lungs, the mouthpiece, valves, hoses, counterlungs and scrubber through which gas is rebreathed.
B-ring
A small plate with a slot for a webbing belt and two side by side holes for clipping on equipment, generally used similarly to a D-ring in combination with a belt slider as an alternative to a butterfly slider
Broco cutter
A type of thermal lance initiated by an electric arc, in common use for underwater cutting work.
BRUV

BTV

Béance tubaire volontaire: Voluntary opening of the Eustachian tubes to equalise the middle ear.

Subsection: Top, Ba, Be, Bi, Bo, Bu

== Bu ==
bubble models

Decompression models based on the assumption that bubbles will form during non-symptomatic decompression.
buccal pumping

buddy bottle
Bailout cylinder carried by a scuba diver, particularly when diving solo.
buddy breathing

Sharing breathing gas from one demand valve by two or more divers, generally after an out-of-gas emergency.
buddy check

A procedure carried out by scuba divers using the buddy system where each diver checks that the other's diving equipment is configured, fitted, and functioning correctly just before entering the water to dive.
buddy diving

A safety procedure where two or three divers monitor each other constantly during a dive and provide assistance or rescue when needed.
buddy lights
Warning lights visible to the diver's buddy that indicate rebreather system status.
buddy line

A short line between two divers, used to maintain contact during a dive, generally in poor visibility, or other conditions where the divers might become separated and not be able to quickly locate each other.
buddy system

A procedure where two divers look out for the safety of each other, and give assistance if the other gets into difficulty.
Bühlmann algorithm
Bühlmann tables

Diving tables and decompression algorithm on which the tables are based, and some dive computers are programmed, based on the dissolved gas decompression model derived and tested by Dr Albert A. Bühlmann.
built in breathing system

A demand breathing gas supply system with external exhaust used to provide chamber occupants with breathing gases other than the gas used to pressurise the chamber. Used for treatment gases and emergency breathing gas if the chamber is contaminated.
bundle
A set of gas cylinders fastened together for transportation and manifolded for use as a unit, also cylinder bundle.
bungee (sidemount)

Length of shock cord used to restrain the top end of side mount cylinders and keep them tucked in at the diver's shoulder while swimming. Usually clipped to a shoulder D-ring of the harness and looped around the cylinder valve. May be attached to the back of the harness between the shoulder blades, or run continuous from one shoulder D-ring, around the back under the arms to the other shoulder D-ring.
bungee wing
Back inflation buoyancy compensator with shock cord lacing or loops which exert a force on the bladder to oppose expansion during inflation and accelerate deflation.
buoyancy

1. Upward force on an object immersed in a fluid due to pressure exerted over the immersed surface.
2. Resultant upward force of buoyancy and weight of an object immersed in a fluid.
buoyancy check
Procedure to test and adjust weights carried by an underwater diver. The diver wears all the personal equipment to be used for the planned dive, with the scuba tank(s) nearly empty, and the buoyancy compensator empty, in shallow water of the same density as expected on the dive, and adds or removes weights until neutrally buoyant. After the buoyancy check it is usual to distribute the weights for safety, trim and convenience.
buoyancy compensator

An airtight bladder worn by a diver which can be filled with air and vented to adjust and control the buoyancy of the diver.
buoyancy control
The skill of maintaining the appropriate buoyancy at any time during a dive.
burn tester
Device for measuring the actual capacity of a battery relative to its nominal capacity, and the associated functional time for the device that the battery is powering.
burn time
The effective use time of a battery powered device. Mainly used in reference to dive lights and scooters.
burst disk

A non-reclosing pressure relief device used to protect a diving cylinder from overpressurization.
butterfly clip
A type of bolt snap with a tapered guide gate opening formed by a protrusion on both the piston and the fixed sides of the gate.
butterfly slider
butterfly D-ring
A plate with two D-shaped cutouts on opposite sides of two to four parallel longitudinal slots for webbing. Used at the top back of the crotch strap in place of a butt-plate (q.v.) on minimalist sidemount harnesses as a clip-on point for equipment.
butt-plate
A rigid or fairly stiff flexible lower extension to a backplate or other scuba harness supporting butt-plate rails, used for clipping off the lower end of sidemount cylinders to the harness.

== C ==
Contents: Top	A	B	C	D	E	F	G	H	I	J	K	L	M	N	O	P	Q	R	S	T	U	V	W	X	Y	Z	References

Subsection: Top, Ca, Ce, Ci, Co, Cu

== Ca ==
cage diving

Diving in a cage designed to protect the diver from potentially aggressive large marine animals, usually sharks
calibration gas

Gas of accurately known composition used to calibrate gas sensors.
CALM

cam band
A strap, usually of webbing, with a cam action tensioning buckle, generally used to secure a diving cylinder to a backplate, stabilisor jacket BCD or other form of diving harness.
camel

A closed lifting bag, for use at or near the surface, which retains air in rough conditions.
canister light

Dive light comprising a light head connected to a battery canister by a cable.
canoe diving

Scuba diving from canoes, used when the dive site is beyond convenient swimming distances.
carbon dioxide poisoning

The toxic effects of carbon dioxide, due to incomplete elimination of carbon dioxide resulting from skip breathing, excessive work of breathing, scrubber failure in a rebreather system, or inadequate ventilation in a diving chamber or free flow helmet. Occasionally caused by contaminated gas supply.
carbon monoxide poisoning

The toxic effects of carbon monoxide, usually due to contaminated breathing gas supply.
cardio-pulmonary resuscitation

An emergency procedure which is performed in an effort to manually preserve intact brain function until further measures are taken to restore spontaneous blood circulation and breathing in a person in cardiac arrest
CAS

cascade filling

Decanting from several storage cylinders in succession, generally using a procedure to maximise charge pressures. Often used in partial pressure gas blending.
catenary anchor leg mooring

Single point mooring type named for the catenary curve of the anchor cables that hold the buoy in position. Also referred to as single buoy mooring, monobuoy or loading buoy.
caustic cocktail

A mixture of water and carbon dioxide absorbent caused by flooding the scrubber of a diving rebreather, and which may reach the diver's mouth through the breathing loop. The alkalinity depends on the absorbent used, and may injure the diver if aspirated.
cave

A naturally occurring cavity in bedrock, or an underwater passage not illuminated by natural daylight, large enough to be entered by a human. Statute 810.13 of the Florida legislature defines a cave as: any void, cavity, recess, or system of interconnecting passages which naturally occurs beneath the surface of the earth or within a cliff or ledge, including natural subsurface water and drainage systems but not including any mine, tunnel, aqueduct, or other manmade excavation, and which is large enough to permit a person to enter. The word "cave" includes any cavern, natural pit, or sinkhole which is an extension of an entrance to a cave.
cave arrow

Directional line markers which point the way to an exit.
cave fill
Filling a scuba cylinder to a pressure significantly above the rated safe working pressure (charging pressure). Illegal in some jurisdictions, and increases risk of catastrophic failure.
cave line
1. Application: A distance line laid in a cave for navigation.
2. Material: Small diameter braided synthetic cordage used for distance lines in cave diving .
cave reel

A reel specifically made for cave diving, used to lay and recover large lengths of cave line which is used as a temporary guide line to find the exit or a permanent guide line.
cavern
1. Two or more interconnected underground rooms or passages in bedrock, each large enough to be entered by a human.
2. The initial space in an underwater cave system that is illuminated by natural daylight.
3. A naturally occurring cavity in bedrock or an underwater passage, large enough to be entered by a human, which is illuminated by natural daylight, or in which it is possible from all points to see the exit by natural daylight.
cavern dive
Defined as a penetration dive under rock where visibility is greater than 40 feet, maximum penetration does not exceed 130 feet, maximum depth does not exceed 70 feet, the diver is always within the area illuminated by ambient sunlight, and does not pass through any restrictions.
C-card

CCR

CCUBA

Subsection: Top, Ca, Ce, Ci, Co, Cu

== Ce ==
ceiling
Solid overhead or decompression restriction to a safe direct vertical ascent to the surface
cenote

A sinkhole in Mexico. Generally with vertical or overhanging walls or shafts with water that open into a cave system.
certification card
A plastic card issued to a diver by a diver certification agency as evidence of having completed the diver training and experience required for the level of certification.
CF

CGA

CGA 850
Compressed Gas Association valve standard CGA 850 is the standard for the scuba cylinder valve outlet for yoke connectors.
chain chaser
Ring or hook shaped components used for installing and recovering conventional mooring systems. The chaser is hooked around the chain and pulled in the direction of the anchor until it slides onto the anchor shank and is stopped by the crown. The chaser is then used to break the anchor out by pulling directly upwards.
chamber dive
Simulated dive in a hyperbaric chamber pressurised to equivalent pressure to the nominal depth of the dive.
chamber operator
Person competent to operate a diving chamber
channeling
channelling
Formation of void spaces in the granular absorbent in a scrubber which allow gas to bypass close contact with the absorbent material, allowing carbon dioxide to pass through the scrubber.
charging pressure

Pressure stamped on a container for a permanent gas to indicate the maximum gauge pressure measured at, or corrected to the reference temperature (usually 15°C or 20°C) that may be applied at the time of filling.
Charles's law

Relation of volume to temperature at constant pressure of an ideal gas.
charlie foxtrot

checkout dive
check-out dive
A dive done to establish whether a diver's skills are current and responses appropriate and timely, equipment is configured and working correctly, or that team procedures are mutually understood and work as planned.
chicken vest
Sleeveless neoprene wetsuit vest with attached hood.
chimney
A section of a cave that is vertical or near vertical and like a shaft.
Chinese lantern
Connection between pipeline end manifold (PLEM) and single point mooring buoy (SPM) using two to four separate curved, flexible, underwater hose strings.
choked flow

choker (sidemount)

A strap around the neck of a sidemount cylinder used to hold the bolt snap closer to the neck so that the head of the cylinder stays closer to the diver's armpit. The choker can be a small webbing strap with a sliding buckle for adjustment, so it can be tightened to bring the clip closer to the neck or slacked off while in use.
chokes

A symptom of decompression sickness manifested by shortness of breath, caused by a large number of venous gas bubbles in the lung capillaries which interfere with gas exchange.
Christmas tree

An assembly of valves, spools, and fittings installed on top of the wellhead and used primarily to control the flow, usually oil or gas, out of the well.
Christmas tree ladder
A boarding ladder which has a single central rail with rigid cantilevered rungs to each side, allowing use while wearing swimfins.
Christo-lube
Usually Christo-lube MCG111, an oxygen compatible lubricant suitable for use in breathing apparatus in oxygen service.

Subsection: Top, Ca, Ce, Ci, Co, Cu

== Ci ==
circuit
Cave dive route in which there is a one-way segment. The circuit can be simple or complex depending on the number of jumps involved.
civils

closed bell

A closed or dry bell is a pressure vessel for human occupancy which is lowered into the sea to the workplace, equalised in pressure to the environment, and opened to allow the divers in and out. Divers may be decompressed in the bell or transferred under pressure to a hyperbaric chamber at the surface.
closed circuit rebreather
closed-circuit rebreather

Underwater breathing apparatus in which exhaled gas is scrubbed to remove carbon dioxide, and the oxygen is replenished to maintain a specific partial pressure, before returning it to the diver as breathing gas. See also ECCR and MCCR.
closed circuit underwater breathing apparatus
Military alternative term for closed circuit rebreather.
clump weight
A weight used to keep the guide wires of a diving bell aligned and tensioned.
clusterfuck

Occasion when the situation diverges notably and usually uncontrollably from the plan, sometimes involving immediate hazard to life and limb, and often involving poor judgement.
CNS Toxicity
Central nervous system (CNS) oxygen toxicity. CNS oxygen toxicity can occur with very short exposures to significantly elevated partial pressures of oxygen and can affect any diver who exceeds or improperly calculates the maximum depth of their gas mix. This type of toxicity affects the tissues of the brain and spinal cord, and it can arise suddenly, causing vital tissue damage or seizures. Less serious symptoms of oxygen toxicity (lip or eye twitching, confusion and anxiety, among others) are unreliable indicators; in many instances convulsions present with no precursors. This is more of a concern when undertaking technical diving compared to recreational diving
CNS Toxicity Clock
The CNS (Central Nervous System) Toxicity Clock is a dive computer algorithm tracking cumulative oxygen exposure to prevent seizures, calculated as a percentage of NOAA-defined limits based on partial pressure of oxygen (PPO2) and time. It typically uses 1.4–1.6 bar PPO2 limits, with 100% indicating the maximum allowable exposure before toxicity risk rises.
CNS Toxicity Roulette
When divers knowingly and willing expose themselves to CNS Toxicity Limits in excess of 100%, placing them at an elevated risk of potentially fatal underwater seizures/convulsions. This risk is faced by deep air divers who dive beyond common gas limits. The name is taken from Russian Roulette, another potentially lethal game of chance.

Subsection: Top, Ca, Ce, Ci, Co, Cu

== Co ==
cobra guard

code of practice

A systematic set of professional standards or written guidelines and rules of procedures to be followed by members of a profession, trade, occupation or organization. A code of practice may be compiled and agreed on by members of a particular profession or written guidelines issued by an official body or a professional association to its members to help them comply with its ethical standards. A code of practice does not normally have the force of law, but is often required or compulsory practice for members of an organisation.
coded welder
Welder who is trained and qualified and assessed as competent for a specified type of welding under specified conditions.
combat swimmer

Person trained in scuba diving or swimming underwater in a military capacity which can include combat
command signal

A signal from a diver in a team that requires a response from the other diver. There are three: "Are you OK", "Hold", and "Surface" (terminate the dive).
commercial diving

Working under pressure: Occupational activity where gas is breathed while immersed at pressure in excess of atmospheric pressure, usually underwater.
compensator

A device comprising a pair of hollow elastic bosses moulded on the inside of a diving mask with a gap between them to accommodate the nose and with finger wells on the outside enabling the wearer to pinch the nostrils when equalising pressure in the ears.
completion

The process of making a well, that has been drilled, ready for production.
competent person
Person who is able to perform a task or operation safely and according to required procedures. Recognition of competence may require formal assessment or accreditation, or registration with government body.
compressed air
Air at a pressure greater than ambient.
Compressed Gas Association

An American trade association for the industrial and medical gas supply industries. The CGA publishes standards and practices that codify industry practices. In cases where government regulation is not specific, CGA documents are considered authoritative. CGA V-1 Standard for Compressed Gas Cylinder Valve Outlet and Inlet Connections covers diving cylinder valve outlets. Safety devices like burst disk overpressure protection are specified by the CGA Standard S1.1.
compressed neoprene
Foam neoprene that has been compressed to reduce volume. Used for dry suits and hot water suits which are less affected by depth induced buoyancy changes.
compression
The process of increasing the ambient pressure on a diver by descending into the water or pressurising the chamber.
compression arthralgia

Pain in the joints caused by exposure to high ambient pressure at a relatively high rate of compression
compressor

Machine which pressurises gas. Generally intake gas is at ambient pressure, outlet gas at higher pressure. High pressure breathing air compressor output pressure is usually 200 to 330 bar. Machines which compress gas at higher intake pressures are called boosters
compressor log
Book or file containing records of compressor operation, filling of cylinders and maintenance records.
compressor operator
Person who operates a compressor, either to fill cylinders, or to provide breathing air to surface supplied divers.
condensate

Liquid resulting from phase change from gas due to cooling, pressure increase, or both.
conduit
Tunnel or passage in a cave system.
confined water
Water that is enclosed and bounded sufficiently for safe training purposes. Generally implies that conditions are not affected by geographic or weather conditions, and that divers cannot get lost.
conservative (decompression)

Decompression profile tending to minimise risk of decompression sickness at the cost of more decompression time for a given pre-ascent dive profile.
constant depth blackout
constant pressure blackout

A Freediving blackout which occurs while the diver maintains a near constant shallow depth, where reduction of oxygen partial pressure due to ascent is not a factor. Usually induced by pre-dive hyperventilation. Also referred to as shallow water blackout, which is an ambiguous term
constant mass flow

Sonic flow through an orifice – the maximum possible flow rate for the gas through the orifice for a given absolute upstream pressure.
constant volume dry suit
Dry suit with an automatic dump valve.
constriction

containment grip

contents gauge

continuous decompression

Decompression without stops. Instead of a fairly rapid ascent rate to the first stop, followed by a period at static depth during the stop, the ascent is slower, but without officially stopping. Ascent rate may vary with depth, usually slowing as the depth reduces.
contra-indications to diving
Conditions (usually medical) that indicate that a person should not dive.
control compartment
The tissue compartment that dictates the ascent profile of a given dive because it is theoretically the highest risk compartment for DCS.
controlled buoyant lift

A rescue technique used by scuba divers to raise an incapacitated diver to the surface from depth.
controlled emergency swimming ascent

An emergency technique for surfacing, usually when no breathable gas is available at depth. The diver fins upward while gently exhaling to keep expanding air in the lungs from causing lung expansion injuries.
cookie

Personal non-directional line markers that mark specific locations, or the direction of one's own exit at line intersections.
copper hat
copper helmet

A diving helmet of traditional design and construction, usually made from spun or beaten copper, with brass or bronze fittings. There are usually two main sub-assemblies; the bonnet is the roughly spherical part which covers the head and is provided with viewports, valves and various other fittings, and the corselet, which rests on the upper torso of the diver, and to which the bonnet is connected when in use, and which may be sealed to the suit and ballasted to compensate for the buoyancy of the airspace inside the helmet.
corselet

Lower part of a standard copper helmet and some other heavy helmets, which clamps to the diving suit, rests on the diver's shoulders, and to which the helmet upper part, or bonnet, is clamped, screwed or bolted.
counterlung

Flexible bag or bellows in a rebreather which compensates for the changes in volume of gas in the loop during the breathing cycle.
CPR

cracking pressure
Pressure required to open a spring-loaded valve. Often applied to the difference in pressure over the diaphragm of a demand valve required to open the valve to start flow. This may differ significantly from the pressure difference required to keep the valve open once flow has been initiated, and the pressure required to keep the valve open may vary with flow rate.
critical air supply

The amount of breathing air required to safely exit a penetration dive. When the available air supply reaches the calculated critical pressure the dive has reached a planned turning point.
critical difference hypothesis

Hypothesis that bubble formation during decompression will not occur if a critical pressure difference between tissue inert gas tension and ambient pressure is not exceeded.
critical flicker-fusion frequency

The frequency at which a flickering light is perceived as continuous, a measurement used to evaluate visual temporal processing as an indicator of alertness and arousal in humans, including use as an experimental indicator of inert gas narcosis in divers, using a simple uncomplicated, non-invasive and objective methodology.
critical pressure

Cylinder gas pressure which determines a safe limit to an underwater activity on scuba, such as start of ascent or turnaround during a penetration.
critical ratio hypothesis

Hypothesis that bubble formation during decompression will not occur if a critical ratio of tissue inert gas tension and ambient pressure is not exceeded.
critical volume hypothesis

Hypothesis that symptoms of decompression sickness will not be evident if a critical volume of tissue gas bubbles is not exceeded.
cross hauling
cross-hauling
Exerting a lateral force on the bell by using a separate cable from a winch. Used to prevent bell rotation on the lifting cable if a clump weight with guidelines is not used, to move the bell to a position other than directly below the launch and recovery system, and may be used to recover a bell in an emergency.
crotch strap
Harness strap that passes from the lower part of the harness at the back, through between the diver's legs, to the waistbelt in front of the harness, effectively securing the harness from sliding up along the torso. In commercial diving safety harness this is often in two parallel parts and allows the diver to be lifted by the harness without risk of falling out.
crushed neoprene
Proprietary material for dry suits manufactured by DUI in a process where the foam neoprene suit material is degassed by exposure to high hydrostatic pressure to reduce the volume after assembly. There is less buoyancy variation with depth as the material is less compressible after the treatment.

Subsection: Top, Ca, Ce, Ci, Co, Cu

== Cu ==
cuff dump
A spring loaded over-pressure dump valve mounted on a dry suit sleeve near the cuff, usually relatively small and non-adjustable, which dumps excess gas from the suit if it is raised sufficiently.
cummerbund
A wide flexible rubber waistband, which helps to maintain a watertight seal between the jacket and the pants of a two-piece dry suit.
current limited

Common failure mode of an oxygen sensor cell in which an increase of oxygen partial pressure above the limiting level does not produce an increase in output current. Such a failure would prevent the control system from recognising an excessive partial pressure of oxygen.
current shear
Variation in flow velocity along an axis othogonal to the direction of flow. Current shear may be vertical, where shallow water flows at a different velocity to deeper water, horizontal, where flow velocity varies across the width of the current, or mixed. Wind induced current displays vertical shear and directional variation with depth in an Ekman spiral.
cyalume

Trademark name Cyalume is a solid ester whose oxidation products are responsible for the chemiluminescence in a glowstick.
cyanosis

The appearance of a blue or purple coloration of the skin or mucous membranes due to the tissues near the skin surface being low on oxygen.
cylinder
1. Diving cylinder: Refillable compressed gas container of water capacity between 0,5 L and 150 L used to supply gas for underwater diving.
2. That part of a reciprocating compressor or booster in which the piston is moved to compress the gas. The internal space is cylindrical with a circular section. The external surface is usually finned for air cooling.
cylinder boot

Rubber or plastic cover for the base of a scuba cylinder to protect it from abrasion, and in the case of domed end cylinders, to allow it to stand upright.
cylinder bundle

cylinder neck

The part of the cylinder end which is shaped as a narrow concentric cylinder, and internally threaded to fit a cylinder valve.
cylinder shoulder

The domed top of the cylinder between the parallel section and the neck with the cylinder valve.
cylinder valve

Valve fitted to a compressed gas cylinder to control gas flow into and out of the cylinder. Also pillar valve.
