= Nine Mile Prairie =

- U.S. National Register of Historic Places
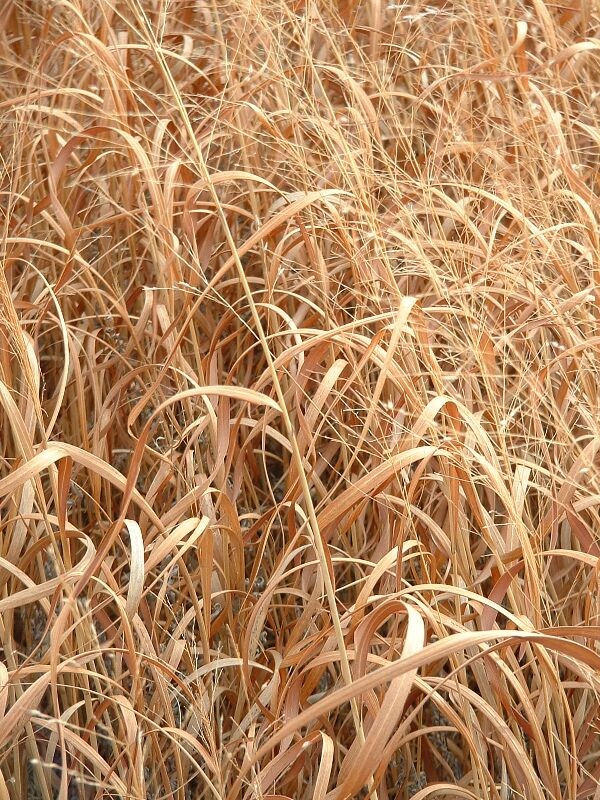

- Location within Nebraska Location within the United States
- Nearest city: Lincoln, Nebraska
- Coordinates: 40°52′1″N 96°48′54″W
- Area: 228 acres (92 ha)
- NRHP reference No.: 86002089
- Added to NRHP: July 30, 1986

Nine Mile Prairie is a 230-acre (0.93 km^{2}) tract of conserved tallgrass prairie in Lancaster County, Nebraska. It is named for its location five miles west and four miles north of downtown Lincoln and is one of the largest virgin tallgrass prairies in the United States. Nine Mile Prairie was added the National Register of Historic Places in 1986.

== History ==
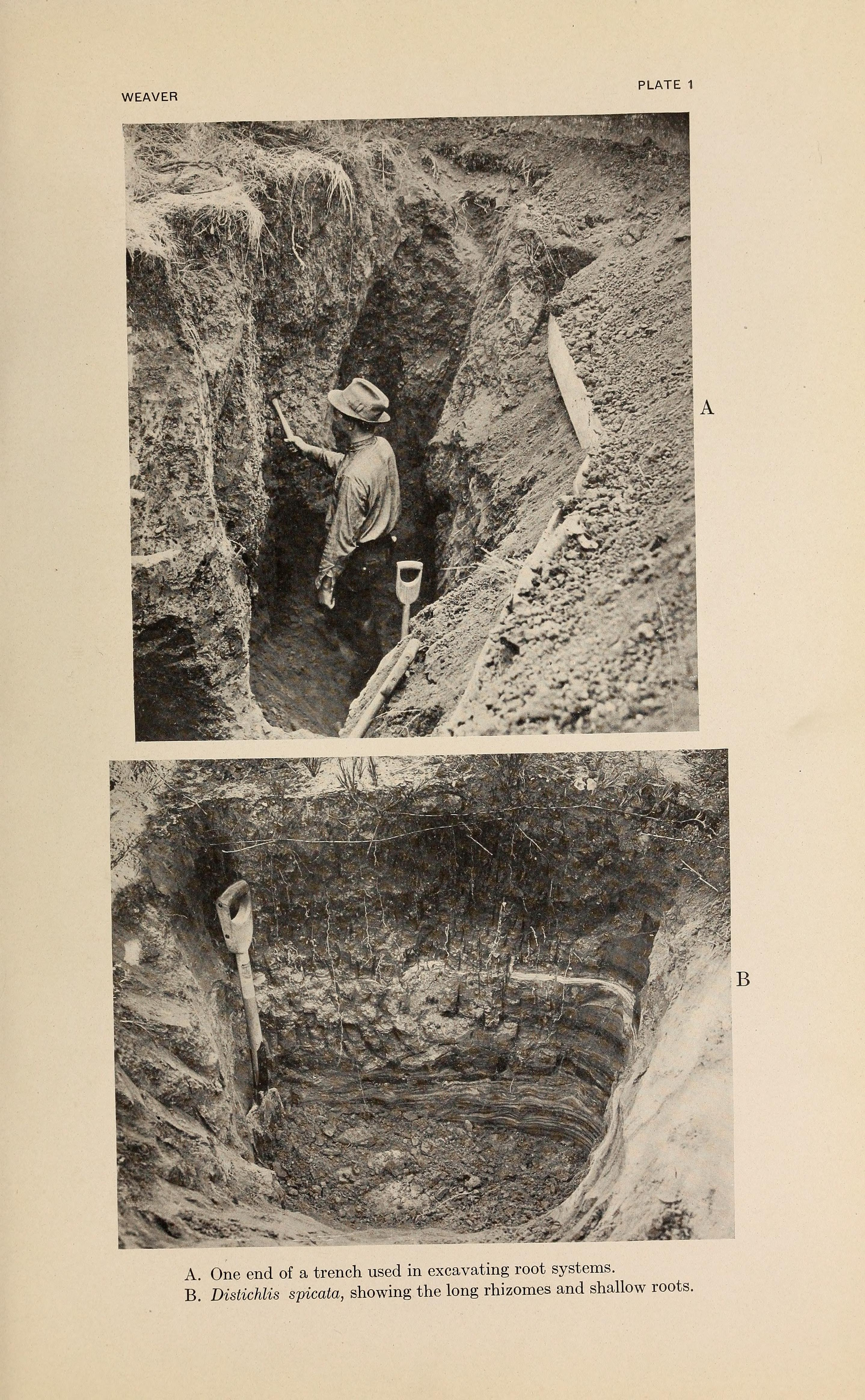
John Ernst Weaver conducted root studies at Nine Mile Prairie throughout the 1920s

The area was owned by the United States Department of Defense and served as part of a fenced buffer zone around a World War II-era bomb storage depot. The facility closed in the early 1960s and the land was sold to the City of Lincoln and managed by the Lincoln Airport Authority until 1983, when it was purchased by the University of Nebraska Foundation.

Nine Mile Prairie is now administered by the University of Nebraska–Lincoln, which uses it for research and recreational purposes, especially for studies of prairie ecology. Research on the land began in the late 1910s or 1920s when botany professor John Ernst Weaver and his students started using it to study prairie plant ecology. Weaver conducted "trench studies" on the land, digging a series of long, narrow trenches to observe the root morphology of the prairie's native plants.

Except for a small portion farmed as recently as the 1950s, Nine Mile Prairie has never been plowed (some of the land was grazed as recently as the 1960s), making it one of the largest virgin tallgrass prairies in the United States. A 228-acre portion of the land, the part of Nine Mile Prairie which was deemed "native, intact, and retaining its integrity," was added to the National Register of Historic Places in 1986. The land was cited as "the most important site directly associated with Dr. Weaver's career."

Though the land is owned and operated by the University of Nebraska–Lincoln, it is also used by the school's Omaha campus, Nebraska Wesleyan University, and Doane University. Most modern efforts focus on conservation and restoration of the land.

In January 2024, Bill and Jon Oberg placed their family's seventy-five-acre property in a conservation easement with the Natural Resources Conservation Service. Though the land was not added to nearby Nine Mile Prairie, it added more protected tallgrass land to the threatened region.

== Nature ==
In addition to prairie grasses primarily composed of big bluestem (Andropogon gerardi), some of which can grow as tall as six feet, the site supports a range of prairie trees, including cottonwoods (Populus sect. Aigeiros) and honey locust (Gleditsia triacanthos). Invasive sumac plants and (in the absence of fire) eastern juniper (Juniperus virginiana) trees require control to preserve the original prairie ecology. A total of 392 species of vascular plants and eighty species of birds have been observed at Nine Mile Prairie.

Notable species include the federally threatened prairie western prairie fringed orchid (Platanthera praeclara) and the rare regal fritillary butterfly (Speyeria idalia), and it is home to bluebirds and white-tailed deer. Herds of bison passed through the site when it was part of a larger, open prairie until the mid-nineteenth century.
