= Quadrat =

Rectangular frame used to demarcate a part of the substrate for detailed analysis

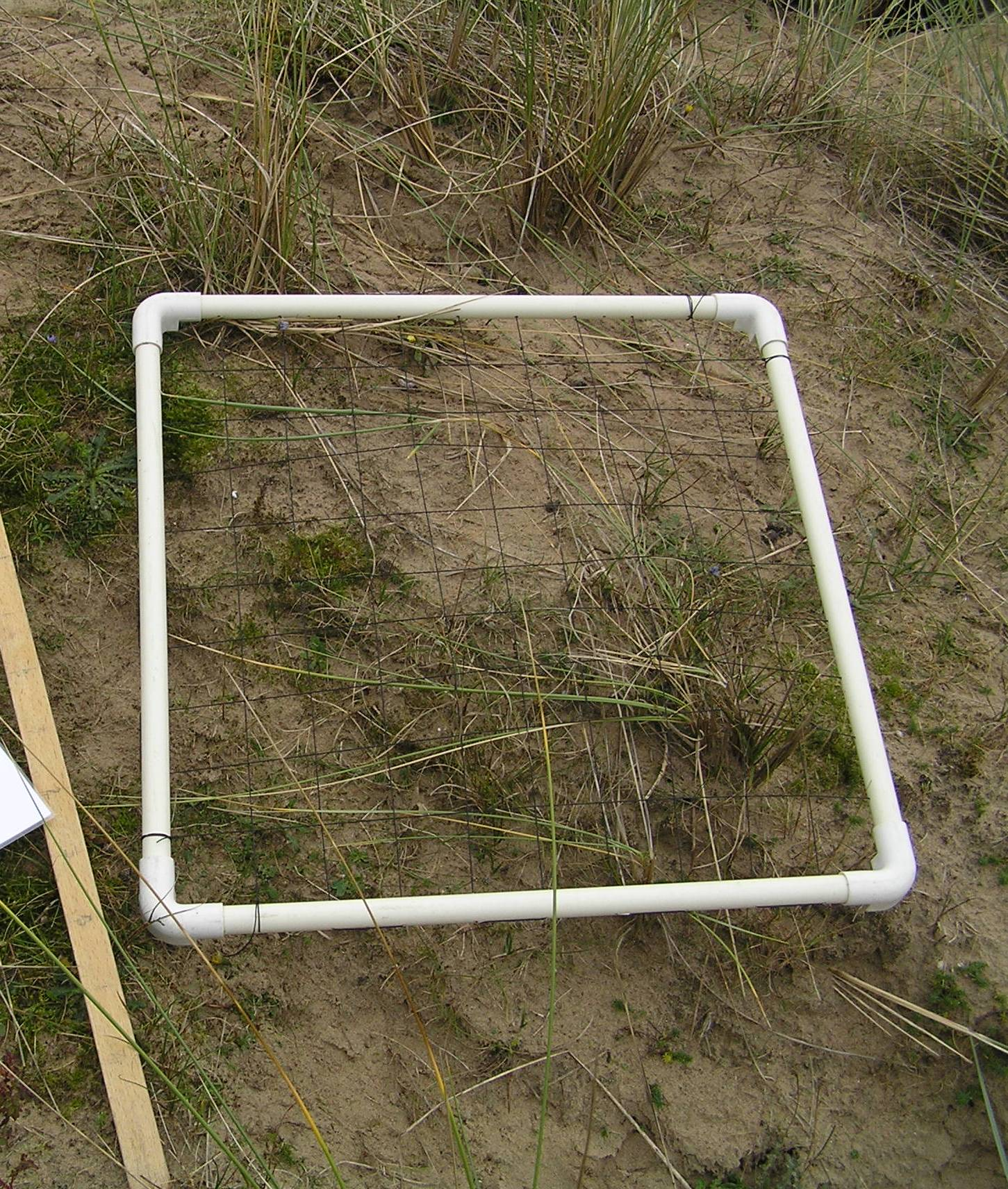
A quadrat used to measure the percentage cover of certain species

A quadrat is a frame used in ecology, geography, and biology to isolate a standard unit of area for study of the distribution of an item over a large area. Quadrats typically occupy an area of 0.25 m^{2} and are traditionally square, but modern quadrats can be rectangular, circular, or irregular. A quadrat is suitable for sampling or observing plants, slow-moving animals, and some aquatic organisms.

A photo-quadrat is a photographic record of the area framed by a quadrat. It may use a physical frame to indicate the area, or may rely on fixed camera distance and lens field of view to automatically cover the specified area of substrate. Parallel laser pointers mounted on the camera can also be used as scale indicators. The photo is taken perpendicular to the surface, or as close as possible to perpendicular for uneven surfaces.

== History ==
The systematic use of quadrats was developed by the pioneering plant ecologists Roscoe Pound and Frederic Clements between 1898 and 1900. The method was then swiftly applied for many purposes in ecology, such as the study of plant succession. Botanists and ecologists such as Arthur Tansley soon took up and modified the method.

The ecologist John Ernst Weaver applied the use of quadrats to the teaching of ecology in 1918.

== Method ==
A quadrat can be used by researchers to methodically count organisms within a smaller, representative area in order to extrapolate to a larger habitat when comprehensive sampling is impossible or not practical. The quadrat's size corresponds to the size of the organism being sampled and the overall sampling area. To avoid selection bias, researchers randomly distribute quadrats throughout the sampling area.

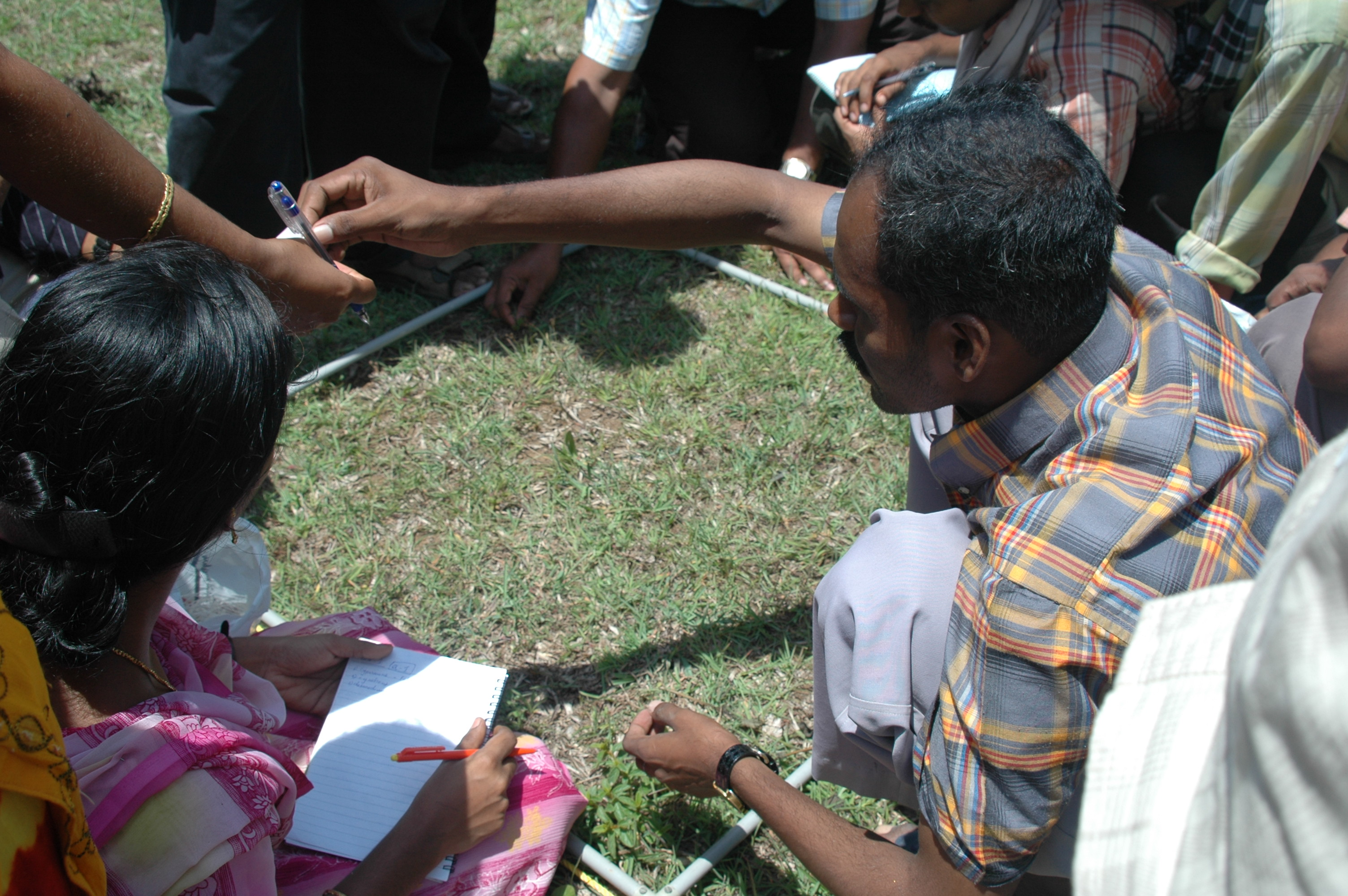
Botanist and students examining the species distribution using a quadrat

For long-term studies, the same quadrats can be revisited after their initial sampling. Methods of precisely relocating the area of study vary widely in accuracy and include measurement from nearby permanent markers, use of total station theodolites, consumer-grade GPS, and differential GPS.

== See also ==
- Stand level modelling
