= Nine Mile River =

Nine Mile River may refer to:

Canada

- Nine Mile River, Nova Scotia
- Nine Mile River (Ontario)

United Kingdom

- Nine Mile River, Wiltshire

United States

- Nine Mile Creek (Utah), in Ninemile Canyon

== See also ==
- Lower Nine Mile River, Nova Scotia
- Upper Nine Mile River, Nova Scotia
- Ninemile Creek (disambiguation)
