= Ninemile Creek =

Ninemile Creek or Nine Mile Creek may refer to:

== Australia ==
- Nine Mile Creek, Queensland, a locality in the Rockhampton Region

== United States ==
- Ninemile Creek (Juneau, Alaska), a stream in Alaska
- Ninemile Creek (Georgia), a stream in Georgia
- Ninemile Creek (Belle Fourche River tributary), a stream in South Dakota
- Ninemile Creek (Onondaga Lake tributary), a stream in New York
- Nine Mile Creek (Minnesota River tributary), a stream in Minnesota
- Nine Mile Creek (Utah), a creek in Nine Mile Canyon, tributary of the Green
