= Nine Mile Road =

Nine Mile Road can mean:

- Nine Mile Road (Virginia), a road in and near Richmond, Virginia
- 9 Mile Road (Michigan), a road in the Mile Road System (Detroit)
- Nine Mile Road, a segment of U.S. Route 90 Alternate and State Road 10 near Pensacola, Florida
- Nine Mile Road, a segment of Washington State Route 291 near Spokane, Washington
