= Ninemile Creek (Belle Fourche River tributary) =

Stream in South Dakota, U.S.

Coordinates: 44°36′02″N 103°14′34″W

Ninemile Creek is a stream in the U.S. state of South Dakota. It is a tributary of Belle Fourche River.

Ninemile Creek was named for its distance, 9 miles (14 km) from Empire.

== See also ==
- List of rivers of South Dakota
