= Ninemile Creek (Georgia) =

- Location within Georgia Location within the United States

Physical characteristics
- Source
  - coordinates: 31.6696336°N 82.9229235°W
- Mouth
  - coordinates: 31.6040810°N 82.8562549°W

Ninemile Creek is a stream in the U.S. state of Georgia. It is a tributary to Broxton Creek.

Ninemile Creek received its name in the 1810s. The name sometimes is spelled out as "Nine Mile Creek".
