= 9 Mile, Lae =

9 Mile
- Village
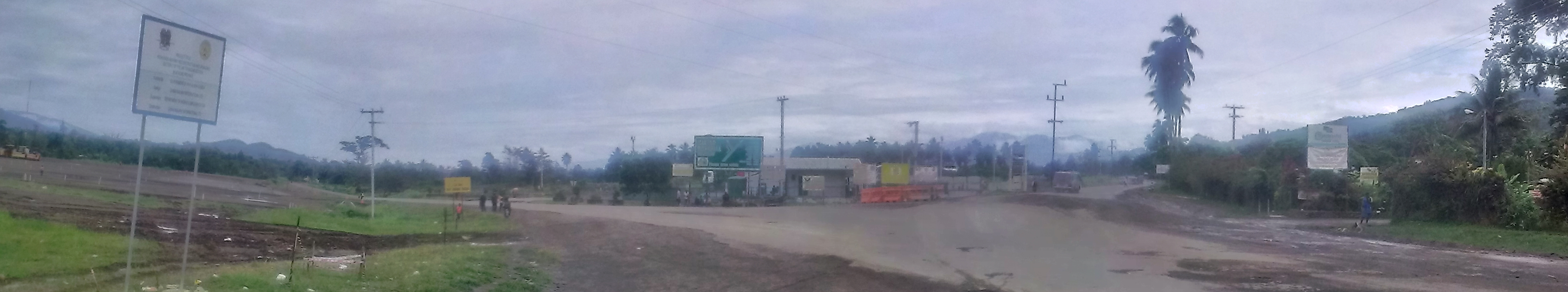
- Truck stop and intersection of Wau-Bululo Highway (left) and Highlands Hwy (right)

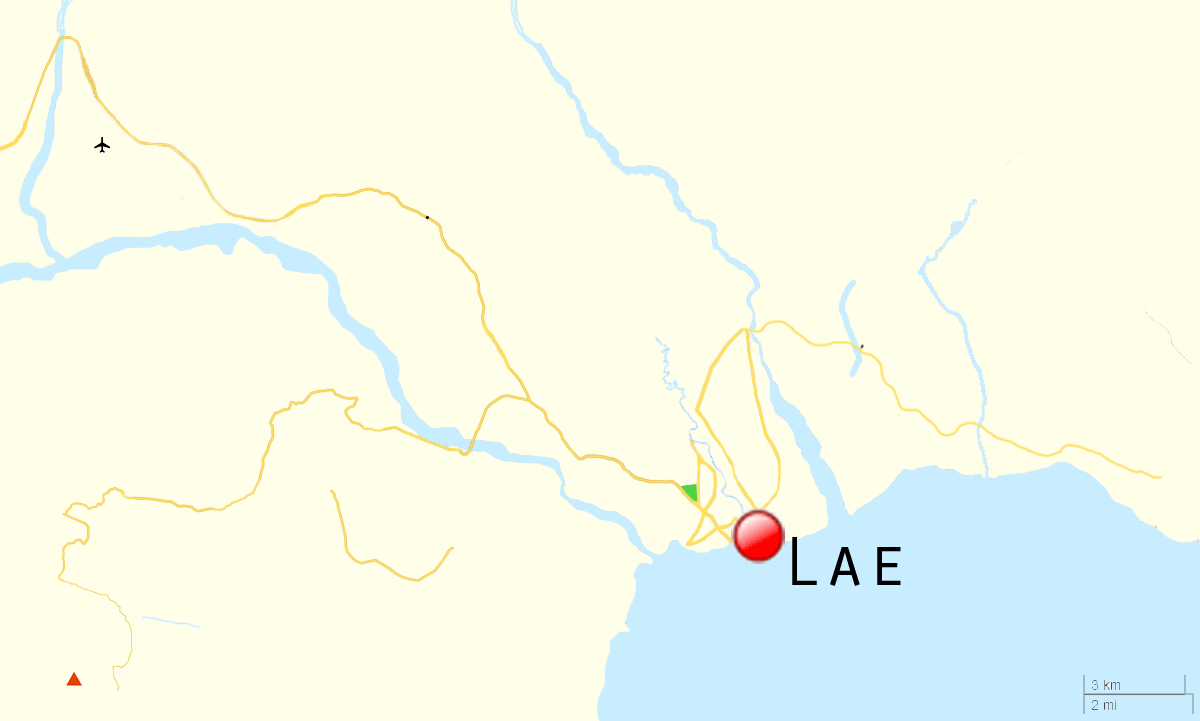
- Location in the Lae area
- Coordinates: 6°35′41″S 146°52′37″E
- Country: Papua New Guinea
- Province: Morobe Province
- District: Huon District
- LLG: Wampar LLG
- Time zone: UTC+10 (AEST)

9 Mile is a large village in the Markham Valley of Morobe Province, Papua New Guinea. It lies along the Highlands Highway 9 miles (14 km) from the center of Lae between the foothills of the Atzera Range and the Markham River. The Atzera Range starts at Bugandi and runs adjacent to the Markham River has an elevation of 280 meters above sea level. northwest of Lae, 7 kilometres (4.3 mi) southeast of Nadzab. The landscape is typically lowland rainforest.

== Geography ==
Anticlines in the vicinity of Lae, such as the Atzera Range and hills near Situm, appear to indicate that the Ramu-Markham Fault (which follows the northern edge of the Markham Valley) changes dip close to the surface from a steep ramp to a shallow fault, breaching the surface south of Lae.

The Lae Seismic Zone has been identified between the Atzera Range and Situm which has the potential to generate shallow Mw~7.0 earthquakes and landslides around the Atzera Range. The possibility of major landsides in this area has increased as a result of human modification to the natural vegetation cover through clearing and gardening.

== History ==
Before the construction of the Highlands Highway, a road in the Atzera foothills in the Markham Valley connected Nadzab with Lae and a rough trail on the other side of the Atzeras paralleled this road from Lae to Yalu. Edward's Plantation was located around 5 Mile, Heath's Plantation around 6 Mile, Lane's Plantation and Whittaker's Plantation around 9 Mile and Jensen's Plantation around 10 Mile. On 10 September the 25th Australian Infantry Brigade moved East from Nadzab towards Lae along the Atzera foothills often with fierce battles through these plantations while the 9th Division approached Lae from the East. On 16 September both units converged on Lae

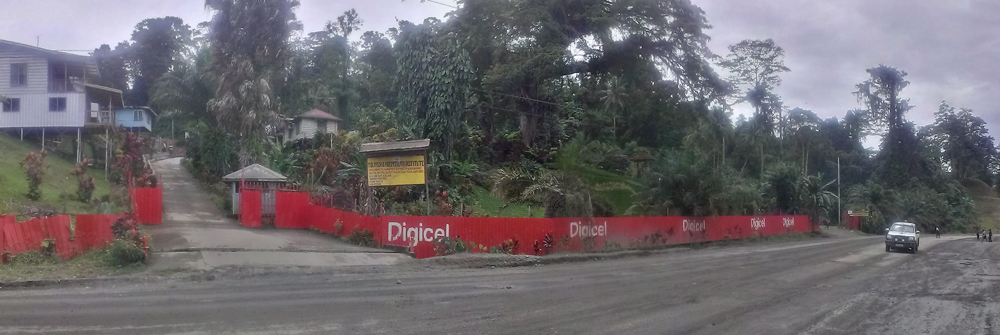
The 9 Mile Hospitality Training Institute on foothills of Atzera Range

== National Agricultural Research Institute ==
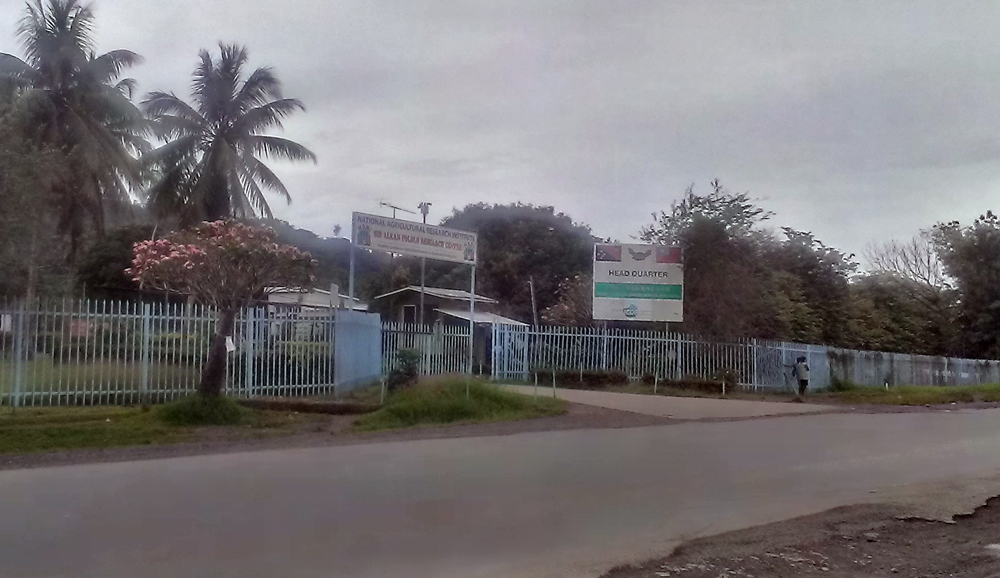
National Agricultural Research Institute

The National Agricultural Research Institute (NARI) conducts and fosters applied and development oriented research in the agriculture and rural development sectors in Papua New Guinea and is responsible for providing analytical, diagnostic and advisory services and up-to-date information to the agriculture sector in PNG. With its headquarters at Bubia, Ten Mile outside Lae, NARI's regional research and development co-ordination centers are located at Aiyura in Eastern Highlands Province, Tambul in Western Highlands Province, Laloki in Central Province, Bubia in Morobe Province, Keravat in East New Britain Province. The NARI's livestock research and development centre is at Labu in Morobe Province and the Chemistry Laboratory at Kilakila in Port Moresby.

=== Atzera Hills Project ===
In 1978 the Human Ecology Programme of the Department of Minerals and Energy, assisted by the UNEP and Unesco (Man and the Biosphere MAB Project 11) and in co-operation with the Lae City Council, instigated the Atzera Hills Project, described as an ecologically sound management system to arrest the rapid deterioration and loss of productive capacity of 600 ha of Atzera Hills.

The Atzera project folded after only three years despite efforts to train and raise awareness on the benefits of charcoal, the uptake in PNG households was minimal.

Heavy rains in 2005 resulted in the Morobe administration highlighting the vulnerability of the city to the weather and recommending that a major rehabilitation programme be started immediately to reforest the surrounding hills behind the city to prevent soil erosion. This problem has been exacerbated as a result of the increased number of squatter settlements.

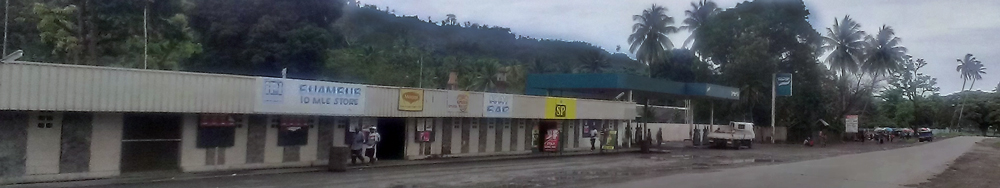
The 10 Mile store and Service Station owned by the iPi Group of Companies on foothills of Atzera Range

== Bubia Lutheran Primary School ==
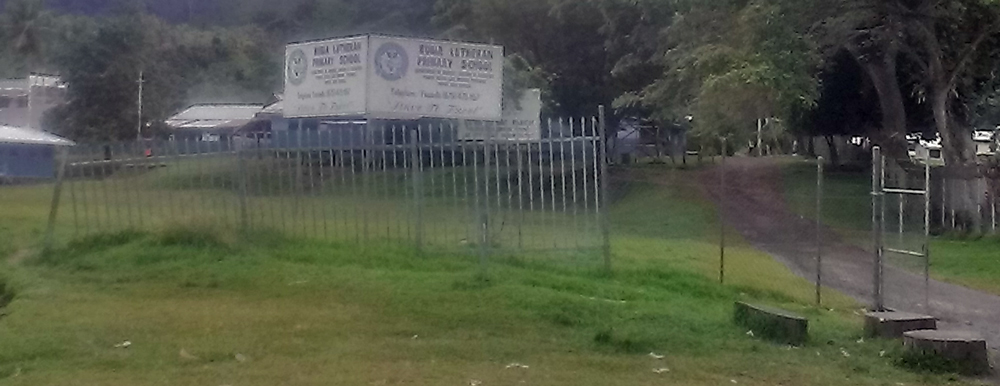
Photo of Bubia Lutheran Primary School at 10 Mile, on Nadzab Road, Lae Papua New Guinea
