= Sustained load cracking =

Metallurgical failure mode of cracking under a prolonged static load

Sustained load cracking, or SLC, is a metallurgical phenomenon that occasionally develops in pressure vessels and structural components under stress for sustained periods of time.

It is particularly noted in aluminium pressure vessels such as diving cylinders.

Sustained load cracking is not a manufacturing defect; it is a phenomenon associated with certain alloys and service conditions:

- 6351 aluminum alloy
- Overstressing due to excessive filling pressure
- Abuse and mechanical damage

== Occurrence ==
Crack growth is reported to be very slow by Luxfer, a major manufacturer of aluminium high-pressure cylinders. Cracks are reported to develop over periods in the order of 8 or more years before reaching a stage where the cylinder is likely to leak, which allows timely detection by properly trained inspectors using eddy-current crack-detection equipment.

SLC cracks have been detected in cylinders produced by several manufacturers, including Luxfer, Walter Kidde, and CIG gas cylinders.

Most of the cracking has been observed in the neck and shoulder areas of cylinders, though some cracks in the cylindrical part have also been reported.

=== History ===
The phenomenon was first noticed in 1983 in hoop-wound fibre-reinforced aluminium alloy cylinders, which burst in use in the USA. The alloy was 6351 with a relatively high lead content (400 ppm), but even after the lead content was lowered, the problem recurred, and subsequently the problem was detected in monolithic aluminium cylinders. The first incidence of an SLC crack in the cylindrical part of a cylinder was reported in 1999.

=== Detection ===
Neck cracks are readily observed during inspection, but body and shoulder cracks are more difficult to detect. Neck thread cracks can be non-destructively tested using eddy-current crack-detection equipment. This is reported to be reliable for alloy 6351, but false positives have been reported for tests on alloy 6061.

=== Contributing factors ===
All of these forms of crack development are the result of the cylinder being subject to high pressure for prolonged periods. The cracks are intergranular and occur at grain boundaries. There is no evidence of stress corrosion or fatigue.

The presence of a relatively high lead content has been identified as a contributory factor. Cracking at the grain boundaries is accelerated in the presence of lead. The presence of bismuth is also suspected to be contributory.

Alloy composition has also been found to be a factor. Alloy 6061 has shown good resistance to SLC, as have alloys 5283 and 7060. Manufacturing defects such as folds on the inside surface have been shown to be harmful, particularly for parallel-threaded cylinders. Grain size has been shown to be of relatively minor importance.

== Alloy composition ==
Material Code
Element (wt. %)	Alloy 6082†	Alloy 6351†	Alloy 6061	Alloy 5283	Alloy 7060
Silicon	0.7–1.3	0.7–1.3	0.4–0.8	Max 0.30	Max 0.15
Iron	Max 0.50	Max 0.50	Max 0.70	Max 0.30	Max 0.20
Copper	Max 0.10	Max 0.10	0.15–0.40	Max 0.03	1.8–2.6
Manganese	0.40–1.0	0.40–0.80	Max 0.15	0.5–1.0	Max 0.20
Magnesium	0.6–1.2	0.40–0.80	0.8–1.2	4.5–5.1	1.3–2.1
Chromium	Max 0.25	-	0.04–0.35	Max 0.05	0.15–0.25
Zinc	Max 0.20	Max 0.20	Max 0.25	Max 0.10	6.1–7.5
Titanium	Max 0.10	Max 0.20	Max 0.15	Max 0.03	Max 0.05
Others each*	Max 0.05	Max 0.05	Max 0.05	Max 0.05	Max 0.05
Others total	Max 0.15	Max 0.15	Max 0.15	Max 0.15	Max 0.15
Aluminium	Remainder	Remainder	Remainder	Remainder	Remainder
*In addition to this limit it is necessary to restrict lead and bismuth to 0.003% max. † Alloy 6351 is essentially within the limit of alloy 6082.
