= John Ernst Weaver =

American botanist, prairie ecologist and university professor

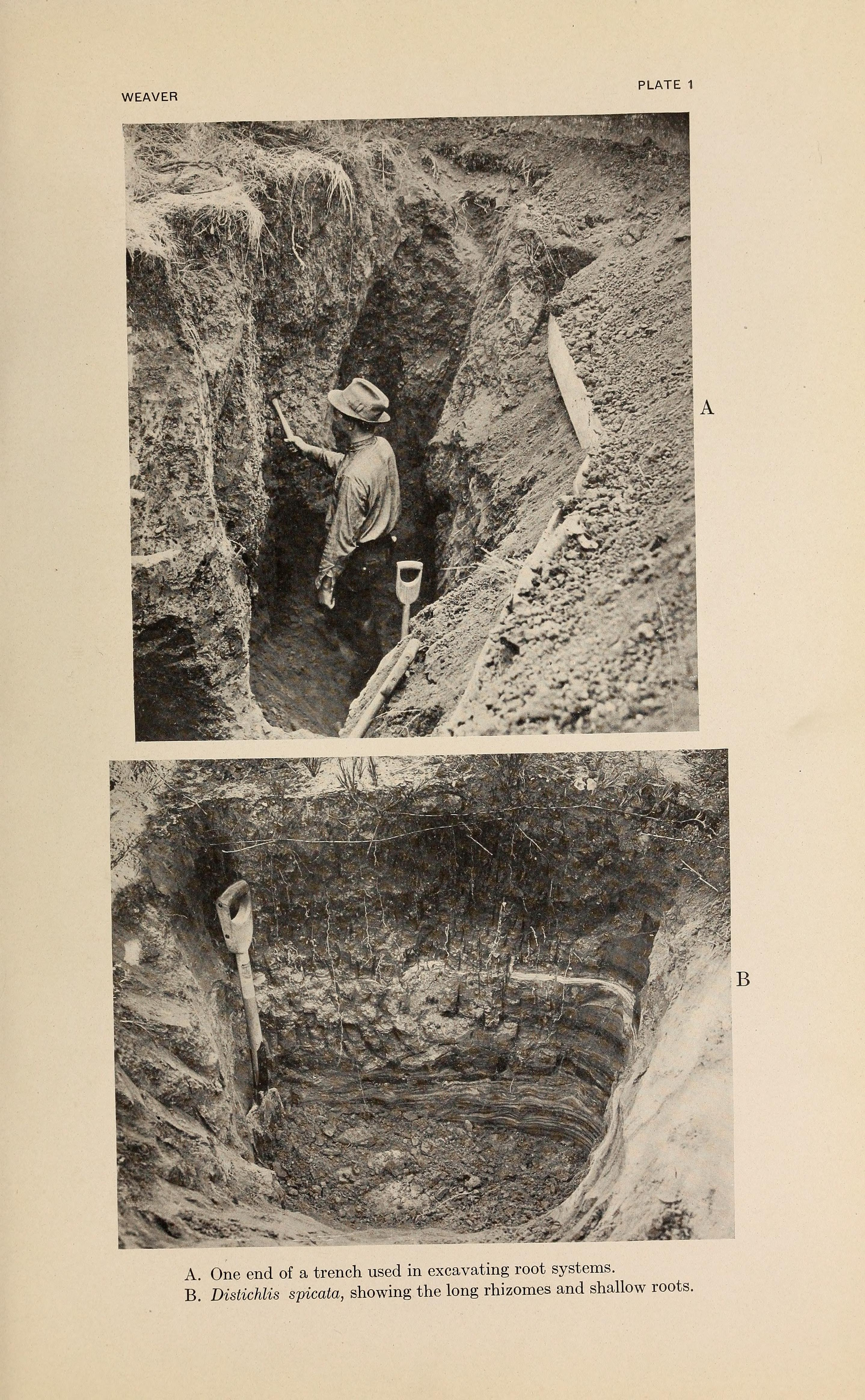
Weaver's method of root-system research. from The ecological relations of roots (1919)

John Ernst Weaver ( 5 May 1884 – 8 June 1966) was an American botanist, prairie ecologist, and university professor.

== Biography ==
Weaver was born in Villisca, Iowa. He obtained a PhD in Biology and Botany at the University of Minnesota, 1916. He was "Instructor of Botany" at Washington State College from 1912 to 1913. In 1915 he became "Assistant professor of Botany" at the University of Nebraska where he was a plant ecology professor from 1917 until his retirement in 1952.

Weaver published many works regarding vegetation and ecology of prairies. According to his biography in Nebraska Authors:

Weaver is famous for his studies of the root systems of prairie plants. A student and collaborator of Frederic Clements at the University of Nebraska, he led the study of the responses of prairie plants and the Great Plains to the great drought of the 1930s. He co-authored several important botany textbooks with Clements, but moved beyond Clements' paradigm of plant succession and in recognizing the need to preserve prairies, altered plant ecologists' views of the place of human efforts in preserving the natural world.

In 1929 Weaver and Henry Chandler Cowles published the first American ecology textbook. According to his obituary at the Ecological Society of America, which he served as both vice president and president (1924–1925 and 1930 respectively):

He is perhaps most noted for his pioneer studies on the prairies of central North America, particularly in eastern Nebraska and the surrounding area. He made intensive studies of original prairies before the drought of the 1930's, and recorded the subsequent changes of vegetation during and after the drought.

He was also a member of the Botanical Society of America, and the Nebraska Academy of Sciences.

== Books ==
- Study of Amygdalus persica. Unpublished thesis (1910)
- A Study of the vegetation of Southeastern Washington and Adjacent Idaho. Lincoln, Nebraska. (1917)
- The ecological relations of roots. - Carnegie institution of Washington, Publ. 286. (1919)
- Root development in the grassland formation, a correlation of the root systems of native vegetation and crop plants. Washington, Carnegie Institution of Washington (1920)
- Development and activities of roots of crop plants; a study in crop ecology. Carnegie institution of Washington with franc C Jean and John W. Crist (1922)
- Experimental vegetation; the relation of climaxes to climates, by Frederic Edward Clements (1874-1945) and J.E. Weaver. Washington, Carnegie Institution of Washington, 1924.
- Root development of field crops, by J.E. Weaver. New York [etc.] McGraw-Hill book company, inc., 1926.
- Root Development of Vegetable Crops. with William E. Bruner. McGRAW-HILL BOOK COMPANY, Inc. (1927)
- Relative efficiency of roots and tops of plants in protecting the soil from erosion. by Joseph Kramer (1890-?) and J.E. Weaver. [Lincoln], Neb. : Printed by authority of the state of Nebraska, (1936)
- Plant Ecology. with F.E. Clements. New York, London, McGraw-Hill Book Company, inc. (1938)
- North American Prairie. Lincoln, Neb., Johnsen Pub. CO (1954)
- Grass country of the Great Plains: Their Nature and Use. Lincoln, Neb., Johnsen Pub. CO with F.W. Albertson (1956)
- Native vegetation of Nebraska. Lincoln, University OF Nebraska press (1965)
- Prairie plants and their environment; a fifty-year study in the Midwest. Lincoln, University of Nebraska Press (1968)

=== Writings about drought ===
- Effects of Drought, Dust, and Intensity of Grazing on Cover and Yield of Short-Grass Pastures, F. W. Albertson and J.E. Weaver. Published in Ecological Monographs, Vol. 14, No. 1 (Jan., 1944), pp. 1–29.
- Effects of the Great Drought on the Prairies of Iowa, Nebraska, and Kansas, with F. W. Albertson. Published in Ecology, Vol. 17, No. 4 (Oct., 1936), pp. 567–639.
