= Pressure Vessel for Human Occupancy =

Pressurised Equipment

The American Society of Mechanical Engineers defines a Pressure Vessel for Human Occupancy (PVHO) as a container that is intended to be occupied by one or more persons at a pressure which differs from ambient by at least 2 pounds per square inch (0.14 bar). Since 1977, the ASME's PVHO committee has published standards governing the construction of a number of PVHO applications. The current design standard is PVHO-1-2023. The current code for maintenance and operation guidances is ASME PVHO-2-2019. Similar standards are published by a range of national and international standards organisations.

== List of PVHO types ==
Types of pressure vessels for human occupancy include:

- diving chambers
- decompression chambers
- closed diving bells, also known as dry bells or personnel transfer capsules
- high altitude chambers
- hyperbaric chambers
- hyperbaric stretchers
- medical hyperbaric oxygenation facilities
- recompression chambers
- submarines
- crewed submersibles
- atmospheric diving suits
- pressurized tunnel boring machines

A typical pressure vessel is not defined until there is at least one atmosphere (14.7 psig) of contained gas pressure. Less than that is typically a storage tank, even if there is some overpressure added by design. The rules for PVHO are invoked at 2 psig (13.8 kPa), per Section 1-2.1 "Application" of the ASME PVHO-1 code. This lower threshold is due to the potential for serious injury if a person under pressure as low as 2 psig is rapidly decompressed.

Section 1-3 "Exclusions" specify nuclear reactor containments, aerospace cabins, caissons are not considered under the ASME PVHO-1 code. This is because each of those types of occupied pressurized chambers are under other jursidictions and therefore under other design codes. It is noted while "caissons" are under other applicable rules depending on the specific application, the Occupational Safety and Health Administration specifies the chambers in pressurized tunnel boring machines are under ASME PVHO-1 and any chamber used to decompress tunnel workers must meet ASME PVHO-1.

== Titan submersible implosion ==
In 2018, prior to the 2023 Titan submersible implosion, William Kohnen, the chair of the Marine Technology Society Submarine Committee, drafted a letter with 38 signatures to respond to OceanGate's public stance on not using existing codes and standards. The cause of the implosion is still under investigation, but it was noted the other nine submarines that could reach the depth of the wreck of the Titanic were all designed using recognised engineering codes.
