= Diving chamber =

Hyperbaric pressure vessel for human occupancy used in diving operations

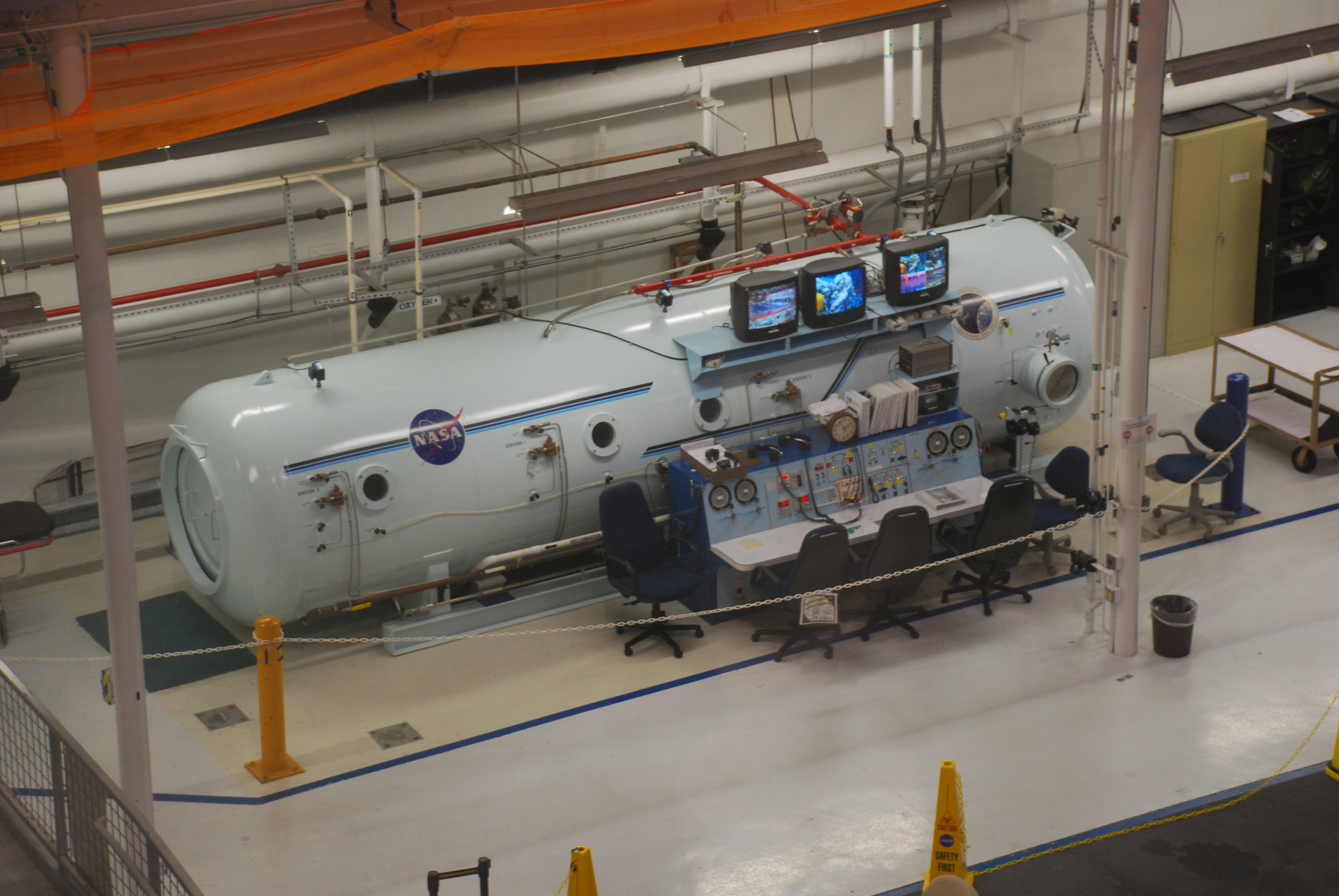
- The decompression chamber at the Neutral Buoyancy Lab
- Acronym: DDC
- Other names: Decompression chamber; Deck decompression chamber; Recompression chamber; Hyperbaric chamber; Saturation chamber
- Uses: Diver training; Therapeutic recompression; Surface decompression; Saturation diving; Diving physiology research

A diving chamber is a vessel for human occupation, which may have an entrance that can be sealed to hold an internal pressure significantly higher than ambient pressure, a pressurised gas system to control the internal pressure, and a supply of breathing gas for the occupants.

There are two main functions for diving chambers:

- as a simple form of submersible vessel to transport divers underwater and to provide a temporary base and retrieval system in the depths;
- as a land, ship, or offshore platform-based hyperbaric chamber or system, to artificially reproduce the hyperbaric conditions under the sea. Internal pressures above normal atmospheric pressure are provided for diving-related applications such as saturation diving and diver decompression, and non-diving medical applications such as hyperbaric medicine. It is also known as a pressure vessel for human occupancy, or PVHO.

== Basic types of diving chambers ==
There are two basic types of submersible diving chambers, differentiated by the way in which the pressure in the diving chamber is produced and controlled.

=== Open diving bell ===
The historically older open diving chamber, known as an open diving bell or wet bell, is in effect a compartment with an open bottom that contains a gas space above a free water surface, which allows divers to breathe underwater. The compartment may be large enough to fully accommodate the divers above the water, or may be smaller, and just accommodate head and shoulders. Internal air pressure is at the pressure of the free water surface, and varies accordingly with depth. The breathing gas supply for the open bell may be self-contained, or more usually, supplied from the surface via flexible hose, which may be combined with other hoses and cables as a bell umbilical. An open bell may also contain a breathing gas distribution panel with divers' umbilicals to supply divers with breathing gas during excursions from the bell, and an on-board emergency gas supply in high-pressure storage cylinders. This type of diving chamber can only be used underwater, as the internal gas pressure is directly proportional to the depth underwater, and raising or lowering the chamber is the only way to adjust the pressure.

=== Hyperbaric chamber ===
A sealable diving chamber, closed bell or dry bell is a pressure vessel with hatches large enough for people to enter and exit, and a compressed breathing gas supply which may be used to raise the internal pressure. Such chambers provide a supply of breathing gas for the user, and are usually called hyperbaric chambers, whether used underwater, at the water surface or on land. The term submersible chamber may be used to refer to those used underwater and hyperbaric chamber for those used out of water. There are two related terms that reflect particular usages rather than technically different types:

- Decompression chamber, a hyperbaric chamber used to decompress surface-supplied divers
- Recompression chamber, a hyperbaric chamber used to treat or prevent decompression sickness.

When used underwater there are two ways to prevent water flooding in when the submersible hyperbaric chamber's hatch is opened. The hatch could open into a moon pool chamber, and then its internal pressure must first be equalised to that of the moon pool chamber. More generally the hatch opens into an underwater airlock, in which case the main chamber's pressure can stay constant, while it is the airlock pressure that is equalised with the exterior. This design is called a lock-out chamber, and is also used in submarines, submersibles, and underwater habitats.

When used underwater all types of diving chambers are deployed from a diving support vessel suspended by a cable for raising and lowering and an umbilical cable delivering, at a minimum, compressed breathing gas, power, and communications. They may need ballast weights to overcome their buoyancy.

=== Related equipment ===
In addition to the diving bell and hyperbaric chamber, related Pressure Vessels for Human Occupancy (PVHOs) includes the following:

- Underwater habitat: consists of compartments operating under the same principles as diving bells and diving chambers, but placed in a fixed position on the sea floor for long-term use.
- Submersibles and submarines differ in being able to move under their own power. The interiors are usually maintained at surface pressure, but some examples include air locks and internal hyperbaric chambers.
- There is also other deep diving equipment that has atmospheric internal pressure, including:
  - Bathysphere: name given to an experimental deep-sea diving chamber of the 1920s and 1930s.
  - Benthoscope: a successor to the bathysphere built to go to greater depths.
  - Bathyscaphe: a self-propelled submersible vessel able to adjust its own buoyancy for exploring extreme depths.
  - Atmospheric diving suit: a roughly anthropomorphic submersible for a single occupant, which maintains an internal pressure close to normal sea level atmospheric pressure
  - Decompression chamber: a pressure vessel used to treat a diver with controlled atmosphere and pressure to prevent related injuries. Medical hyperbaric chambers can be used to decompress divers as well as treat injuries.
  - Pressurized tunnel boring machines: just as the original term for "the bends" or "decompression sickness" came from using air pressure in mining and construction, pressurized tunnel boring machines use air pressure to force water out of the tunnel, requiring the operators to do "dry diving" where they go through the same pressurization and decompression routines as divers
  - Altitude chambers: PVHOs used to reduce pressure for training and evaluating pilots, astronauts, and related fields for high-altitude conditions

== Underwater use ==
As well as transporting divers, a diving chamber carries tools and equipment, high pressure storage cylinders for emergency breathing gas supply, and communications and emergency equipment. It provides a temporary dry air environment during extended dives for rest, eating meals, carrying out tasks that cannot be done underwater, and for emergencies. Diving chambers also function as an underwater base for surface supplied diving operations, with the divers' excursion umbilicals (air supply, etc.) attached to the diving chamber rather than to the diving support vessel.

=== Diving bells ===
Diving bells and open diving chambers of the same principle were more common in the past owing to their simplicity, since they do not necessarily need to monitor, control and mechanically adjust the internal pressure. Since internal air pressure and external water pressure on the bell wall are almost balanced, the chamber does not have to be as strong as a pressurised diving chamber (dry bell). The air inside an open bell is at the same pressure as the water at the air-water interface surface. This pressure is constant and the pressure difference on the bell shell can be higher than the external pressure to the extent of the height of the air space in the bell.

A wet diving bell or open diving chamber must be raised slowly to the surface with decompression stops appropriate to the dive profile so that the occupants can avoid decompression sickness. This may take hours, and so limits its use.

=== Submersible hyperbaric chambers ===
Submersible hyperbaric chambers known as closed bells or personnel transfer capsules can be brought to the surface without delay by maintaining the internal pressure and either decompressing the divers in the chamber on board the support vessel, or transferring them under pressure to a more spacious decompression chamber or to a saturation system, where they remain under pressure throughout the tour of duty, working shifts under approximately constant pressure, and are only decompressed once at the end. The ability to return to the surface without in-water decompression reduces the risk to the divers if the weather or compromised dynamic positioning forces the support vessel off station.

A diving chamber based on a pressure vessel is more expensive to construct since it has to withstand high pressure differentials. These may be bursting pressures as is the case for a dry bell used for saturation diving, where the internal pressure is matched to the water pressure at the working depth, or crushing pressures when the chamber is lowered into the sea and the internal pressure is less than ambient water pressure, such as may be used for submarine rescue.

Rescue bells are specialized diving chambers or submersibles able to retrieve divers or occupants of submarines, diving chambers or underwater habitats in an emergency and to keep them under the required pressure. They have airlocks for underwater entry or to form a watertight seal with hatches on the target structure to effect a dry transfer of personnel. Rescuing occupants of submarines or submersibles with internal air pressure of one atmosphere requires being able to withstand the huge pressure differential to effect a dry transfer, and has the advantage of not requiring decompression measures on returning to the surface, allowing a more rapid turnaround to continue the rescue effort.

=== Lockout trunk ===
A lockout trunk or lockout chamber is a compartment on a submarine or submersible which can have the internal pressure equalised with exterior ambient pressure, allowing occupants to lock out of or into a vessel with internal pressure different to ambient pressure. If the hatch is at the bottom, it can retain gas and be pressurised with gas. If the hatch is on top, gas under the hatch will escape when it is opened, and it is likely to be pressurised by allowing water in through a flooding valve. The escape trunking on a submarine usually uses this hatch on top architecture.

== Out of water use ==
Hyperbaric chambers are also used on land and above the water:

- to take surface supplied divers who have been brought up from underwater through their remaining decompression as surface decompression either after an ambient pressure ascent or after transfer under pressure from a dry bell. (decompression chambers)
- to train divers to adapt to hyperbaric conditions and decompression routines and test their performance under pressure.
- to treat divers for decompression sickness (recompression chambers)
- to treat people using raised oxygen partial pressure in hyperbaric oxygen therapy for conditions unrelated to diving.
- in saturation diving accommodation systems
- in scientific research requiring elevated gas pressures.

Hyperbaric chambers designed only for use out of water do not have to resist crushing forces, only bursting forces. Those for medical applications typically only operate up to two or three atmospheres absolute, while those for diving applications may go to 30 atmospheres or more.

Lightweight portable hyperbaric chambers that can be lifted by helicopter are used by military or commercial diving operators and rescue services to carry one or two divers requiring recompression treatment to a suitable facility.

=== Decompression chamber ===
A decompression chamber, or deck decompression chamber, is a pressure vessel for human occupancy used in surface supplied diving to allow the divers to complete their decompression stops at the end of a dive as surface decompression rather than underwater. This eliminates many of the risks of long decompressions underwater, in cold or dangerous conditions. A decompression chamber may be used with a closed bell for decompression after bounce dives, following a transfer under pressure, or the divers may surface before completing decompression and be recompressed in the chamber following stringent protocols to minimise the risk of developing symptoms of decompression sickness in the short period allowed before returning to pressure.

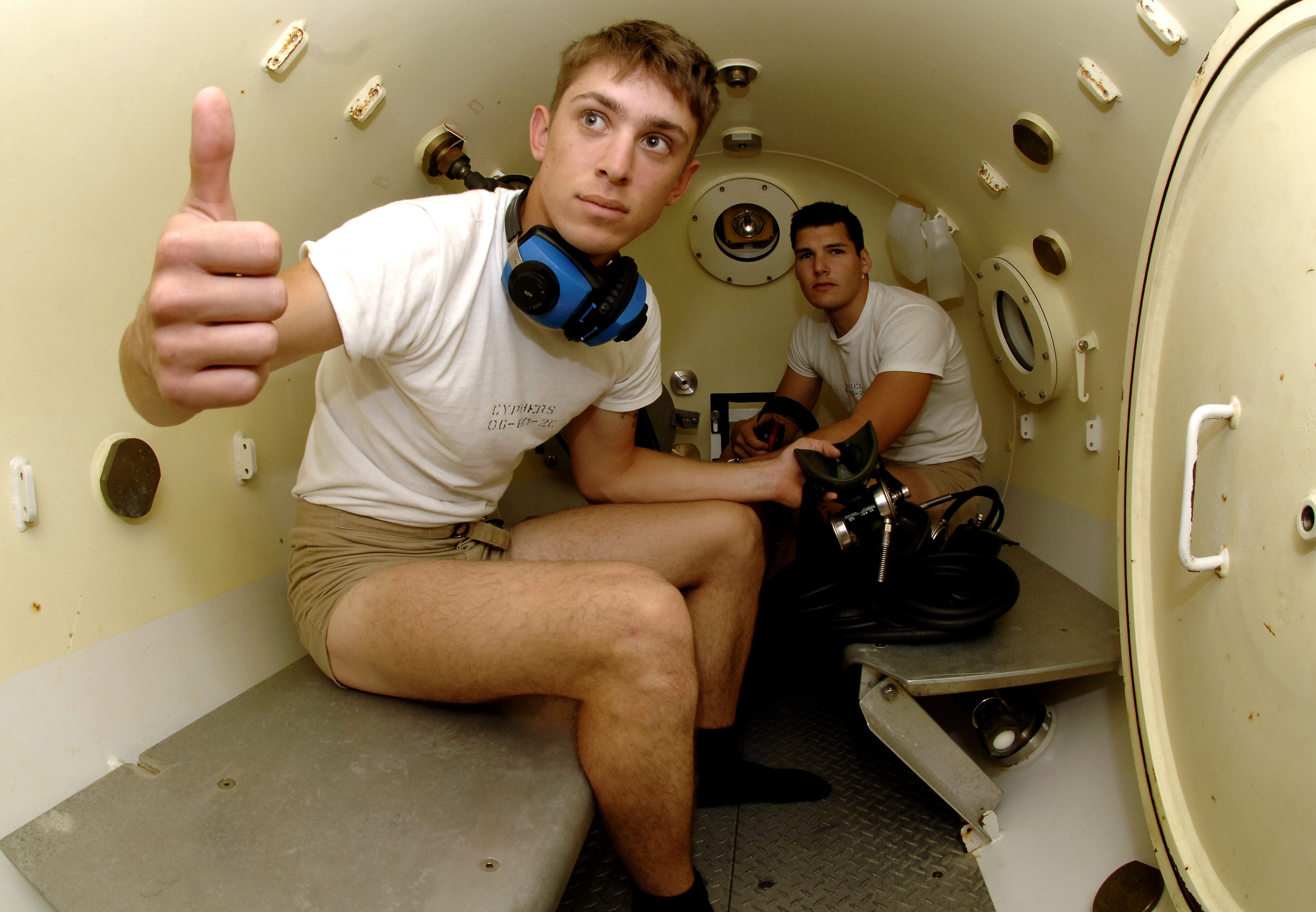
Two United States Navy sailors inside a decompression chamber about to undergo training

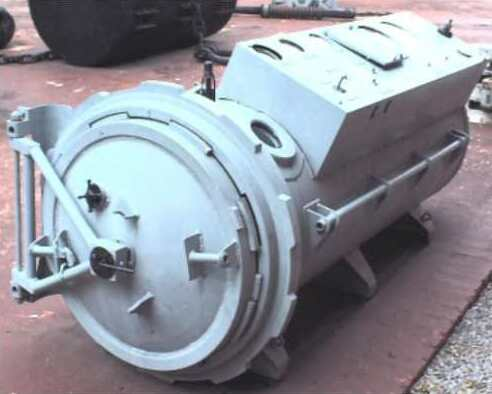
One person chamber

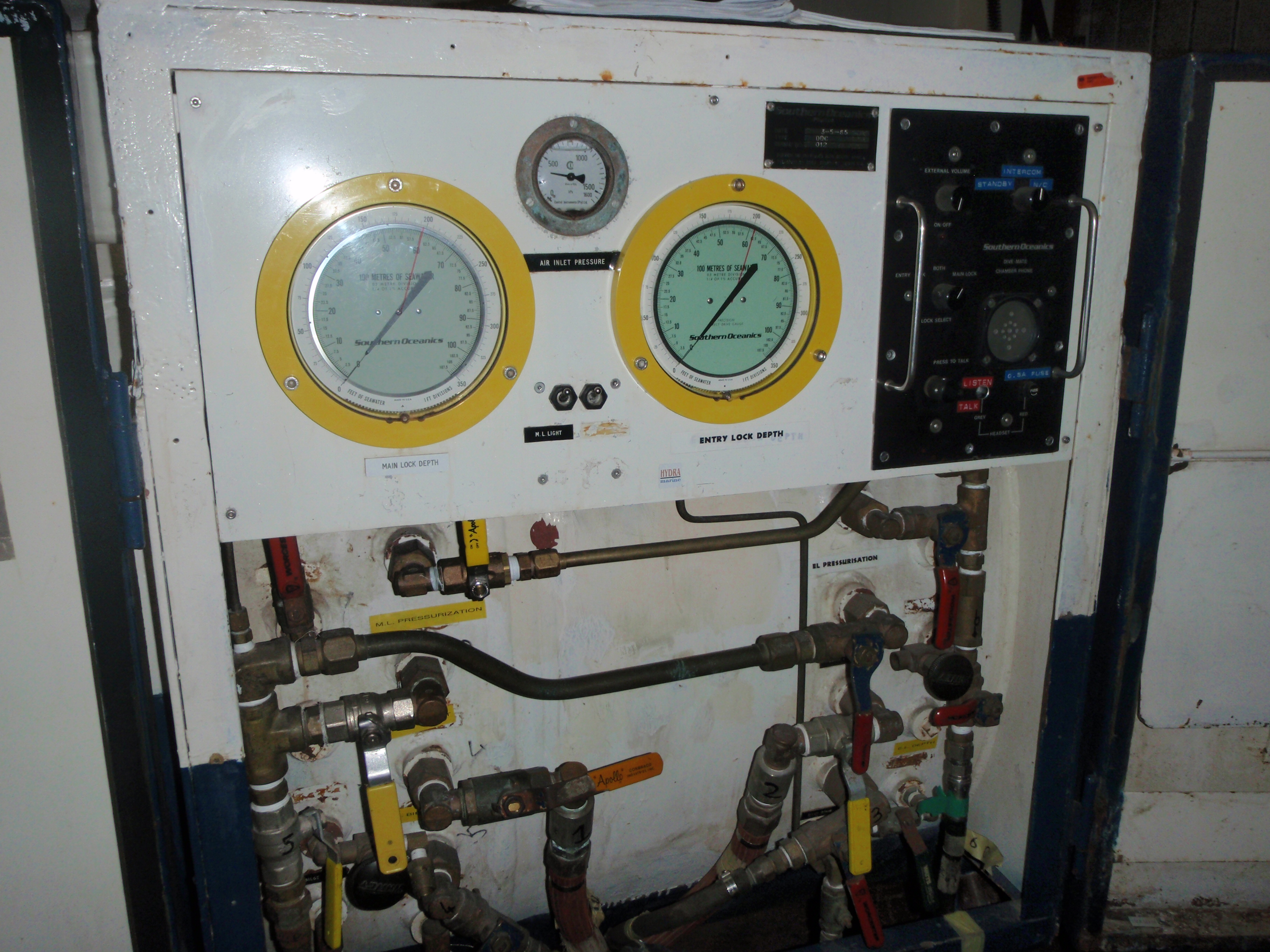
Control panel of a basic deck decompression chamber

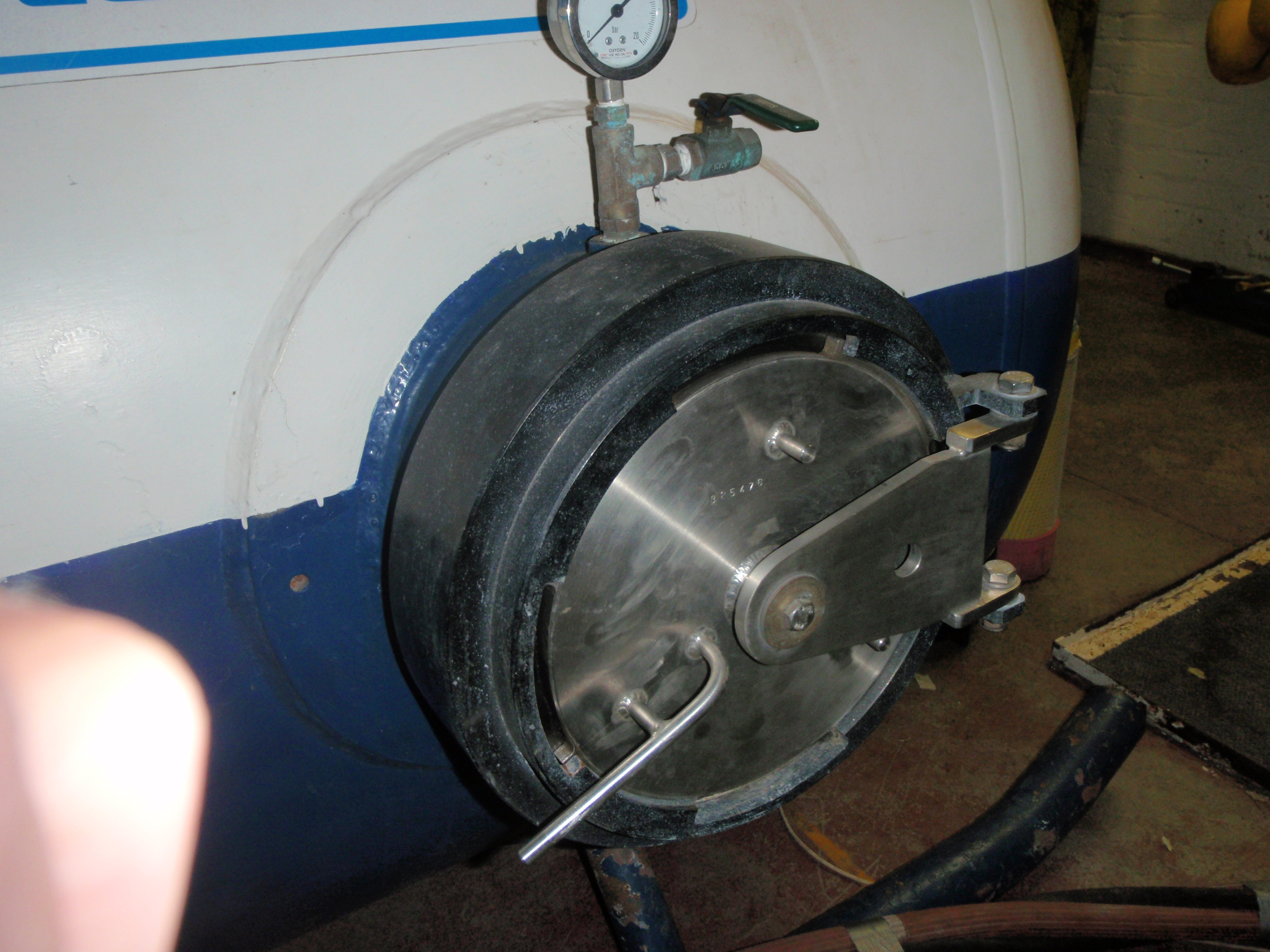
The medical lock of a basic deck decompression chamber with the door closed

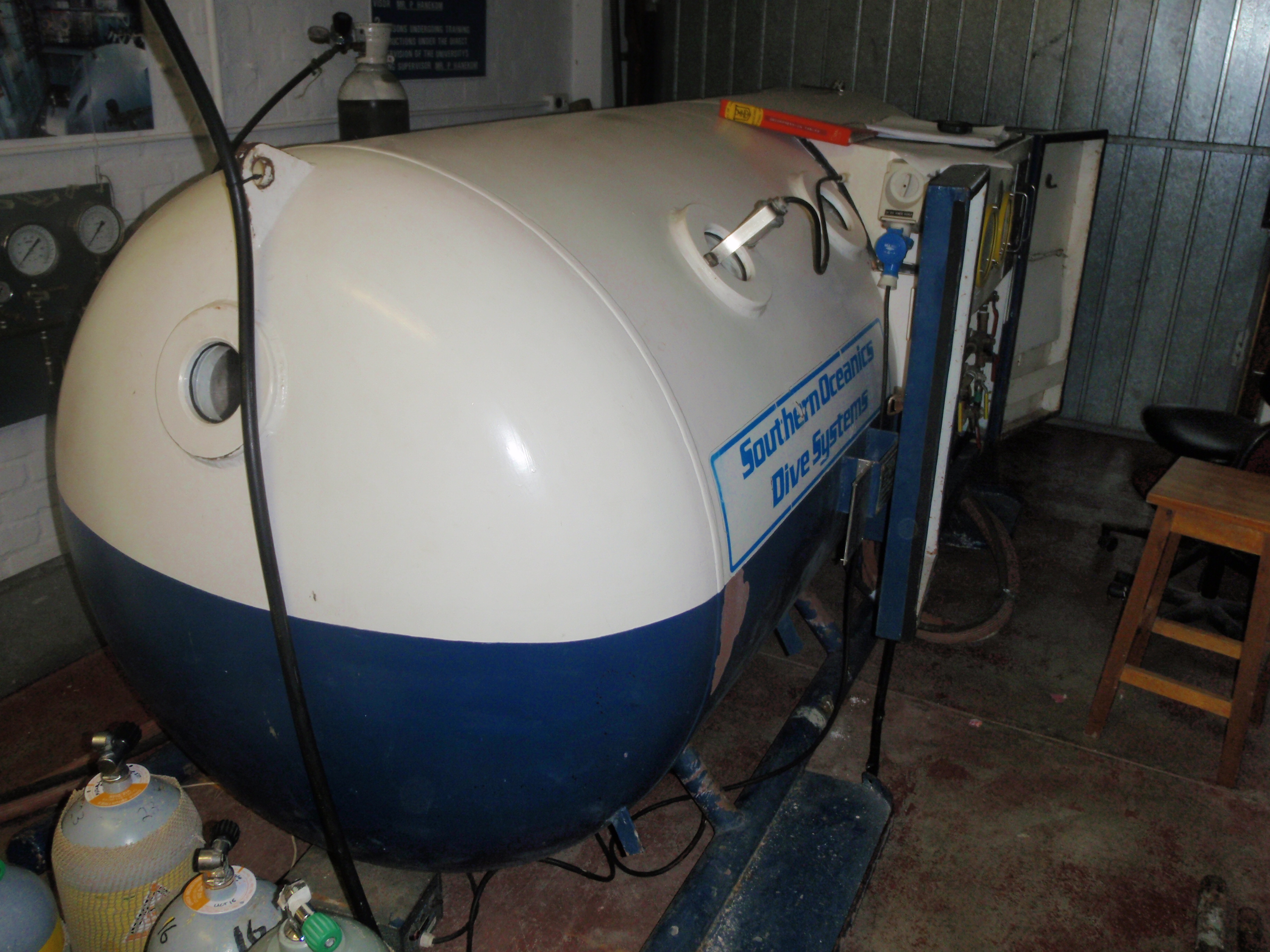
Exterior view of a basic deck decompression chamber

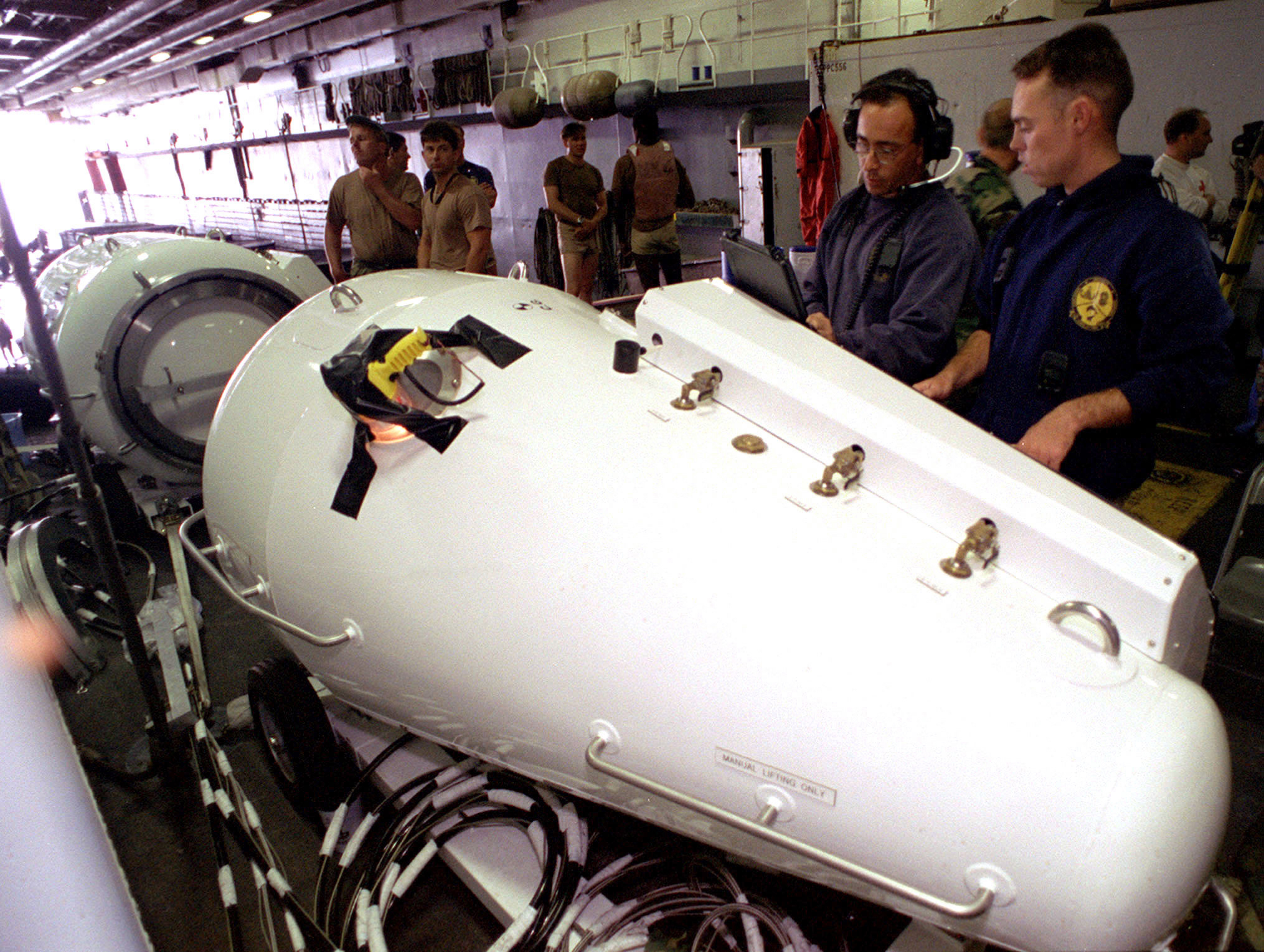
Transportable decompression chamber

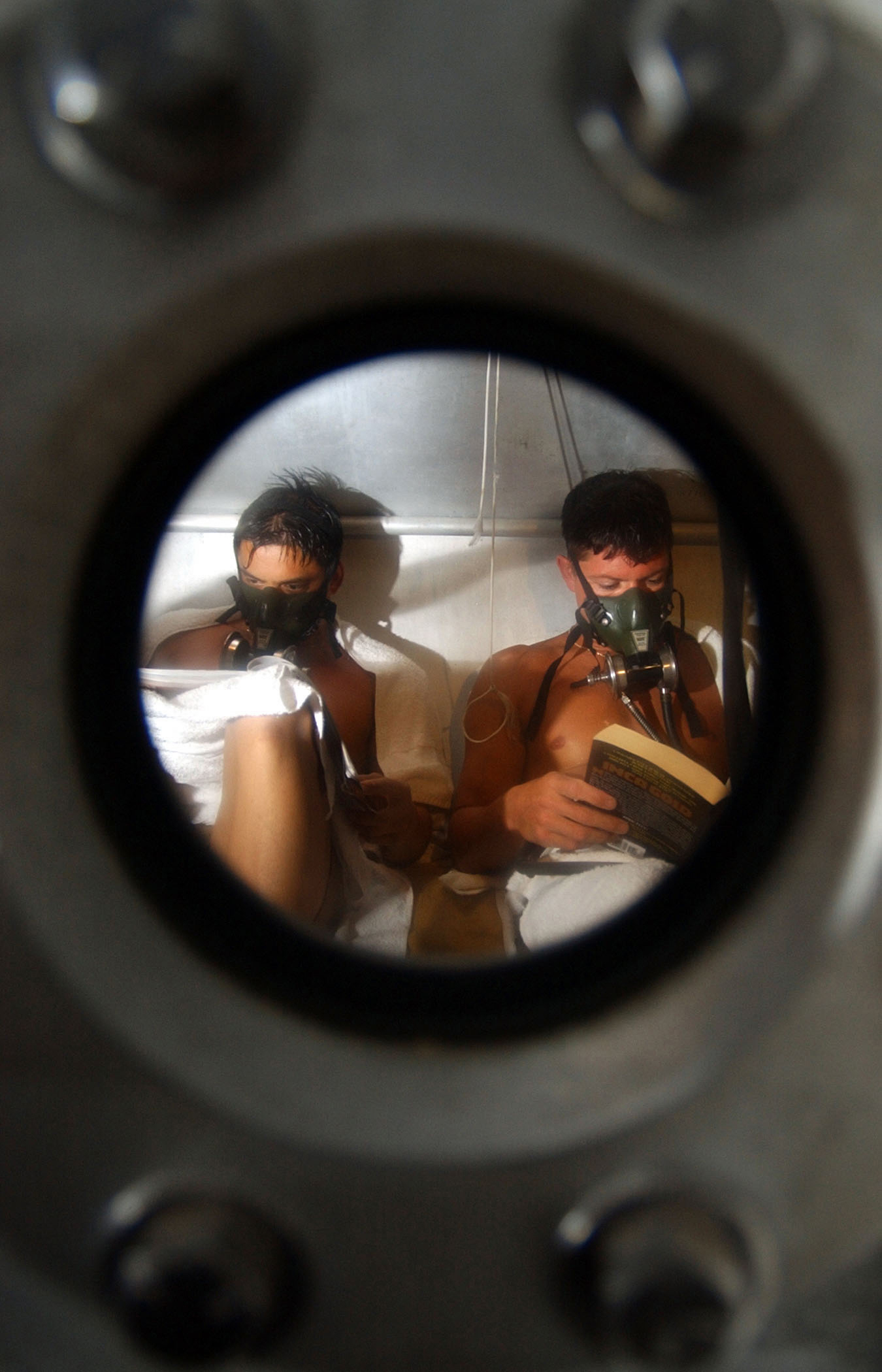
Divers breathing oxygen during surface decompression

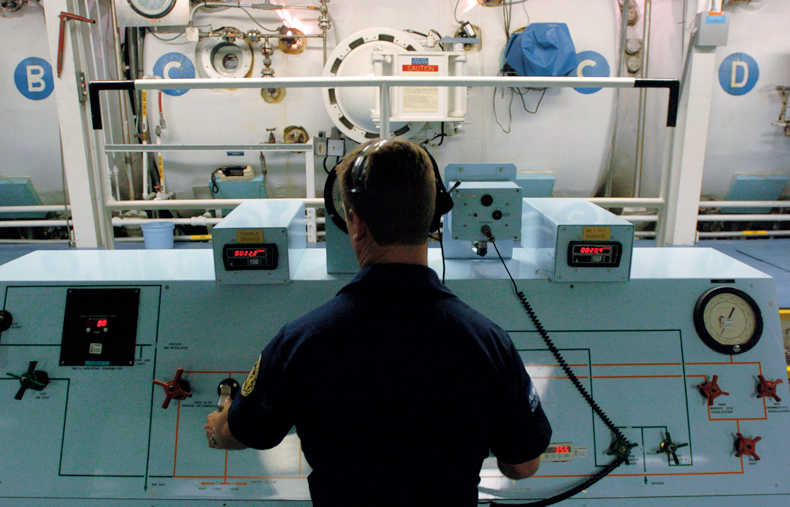
Operating a chamber from the control panel

=== Hyperbaric treatment chamber ===
A hyperbaric treatment chamber is a hyperbaric chamber intended for, or put into service for, medical treatment at pressures above the local atmospheric pressure.

==== Hyperbaric oxygen therapy chamber ====
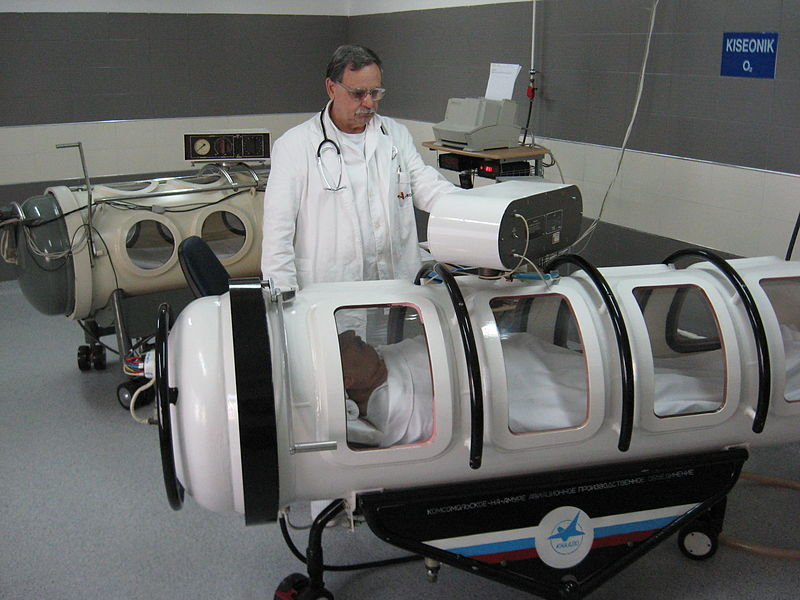
Monoplace chamber for clinical hyperbaric oxygen treatment

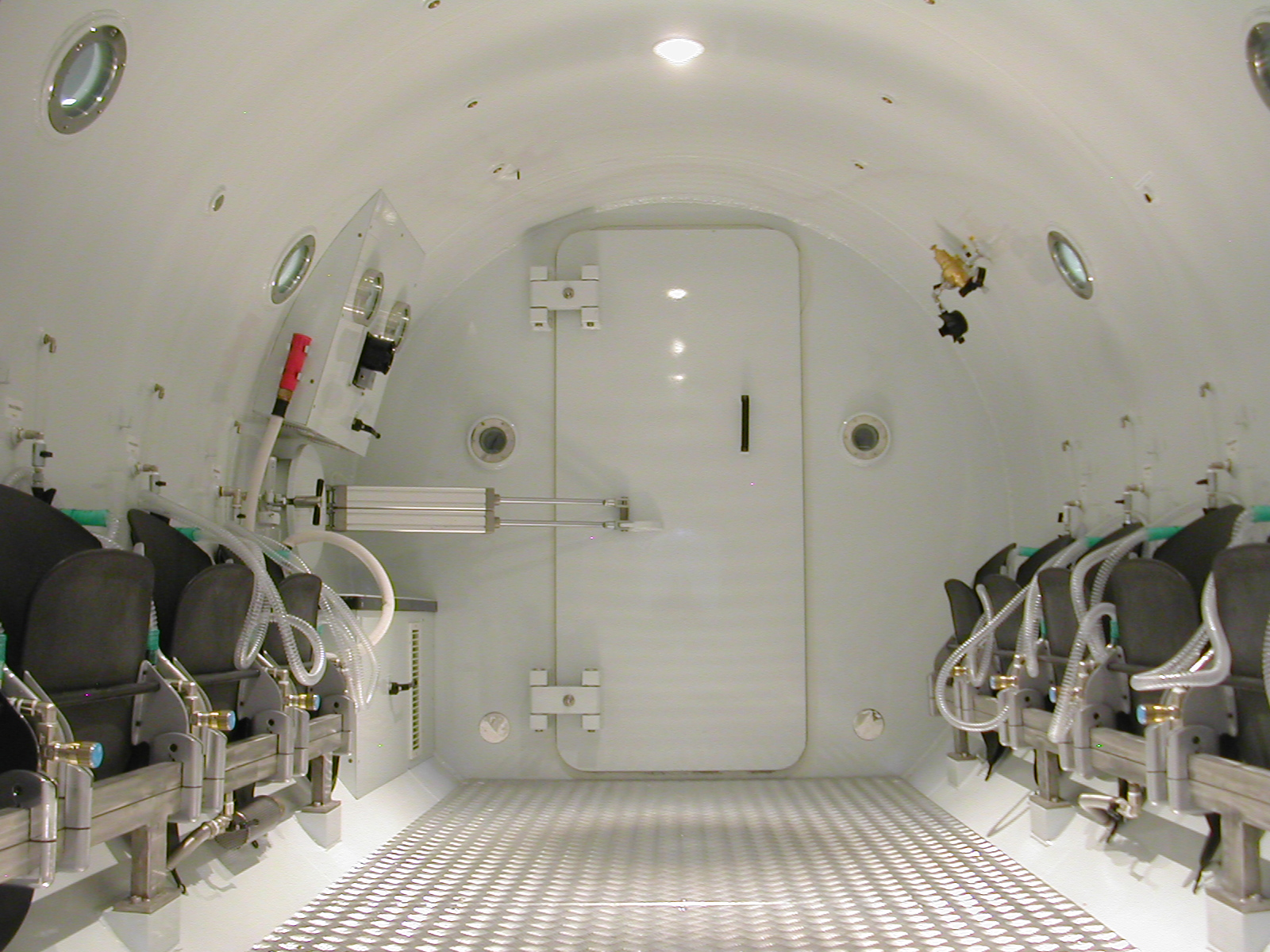
Internal view of a multiplace chamber for hyperbaric oxygen therapy, showing the airtight door leading to the entry lock.

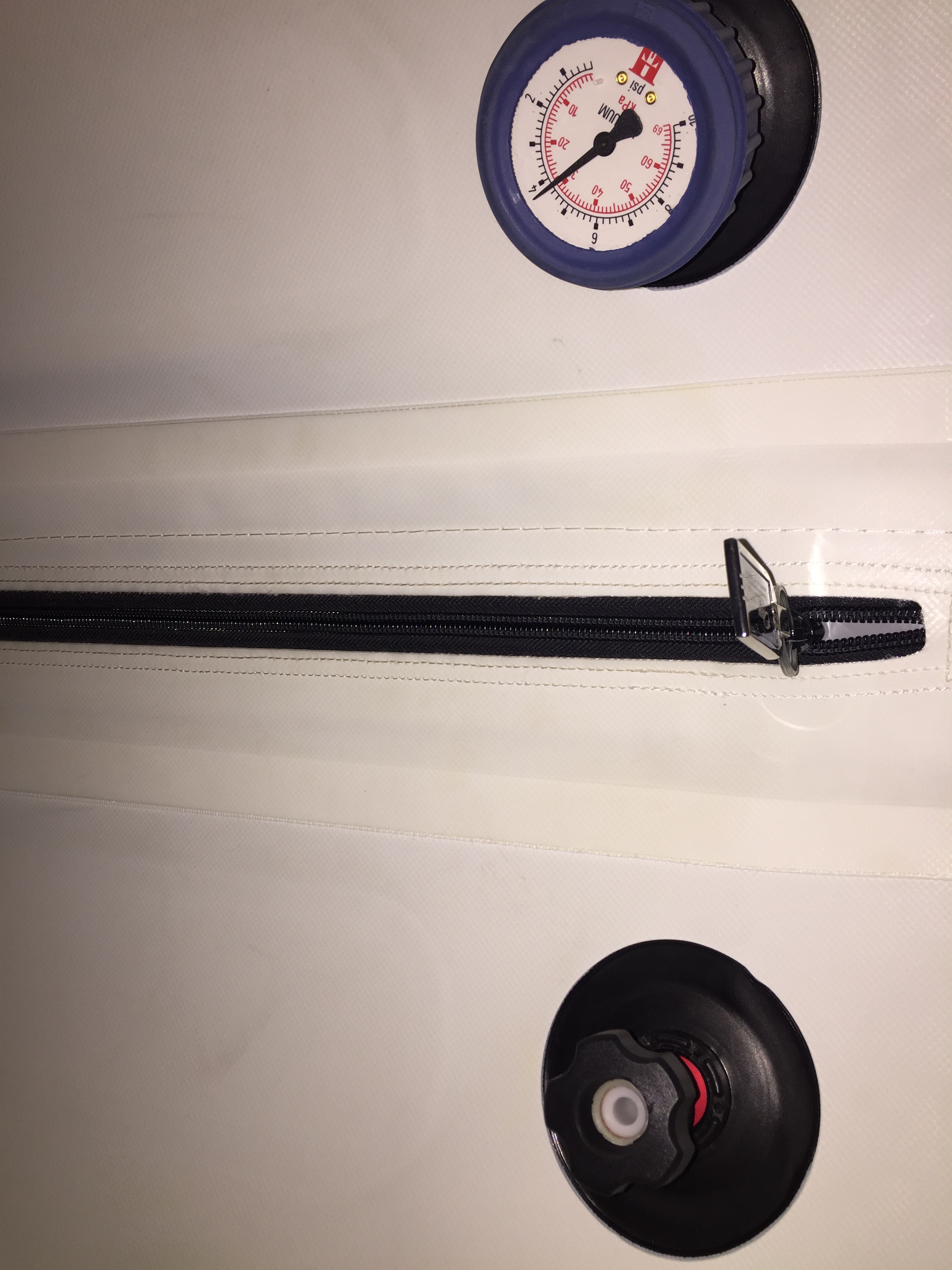
Pressure release valve and pressure gauge inside a flexible low pressure hyperbaric oxygen therapy chamber

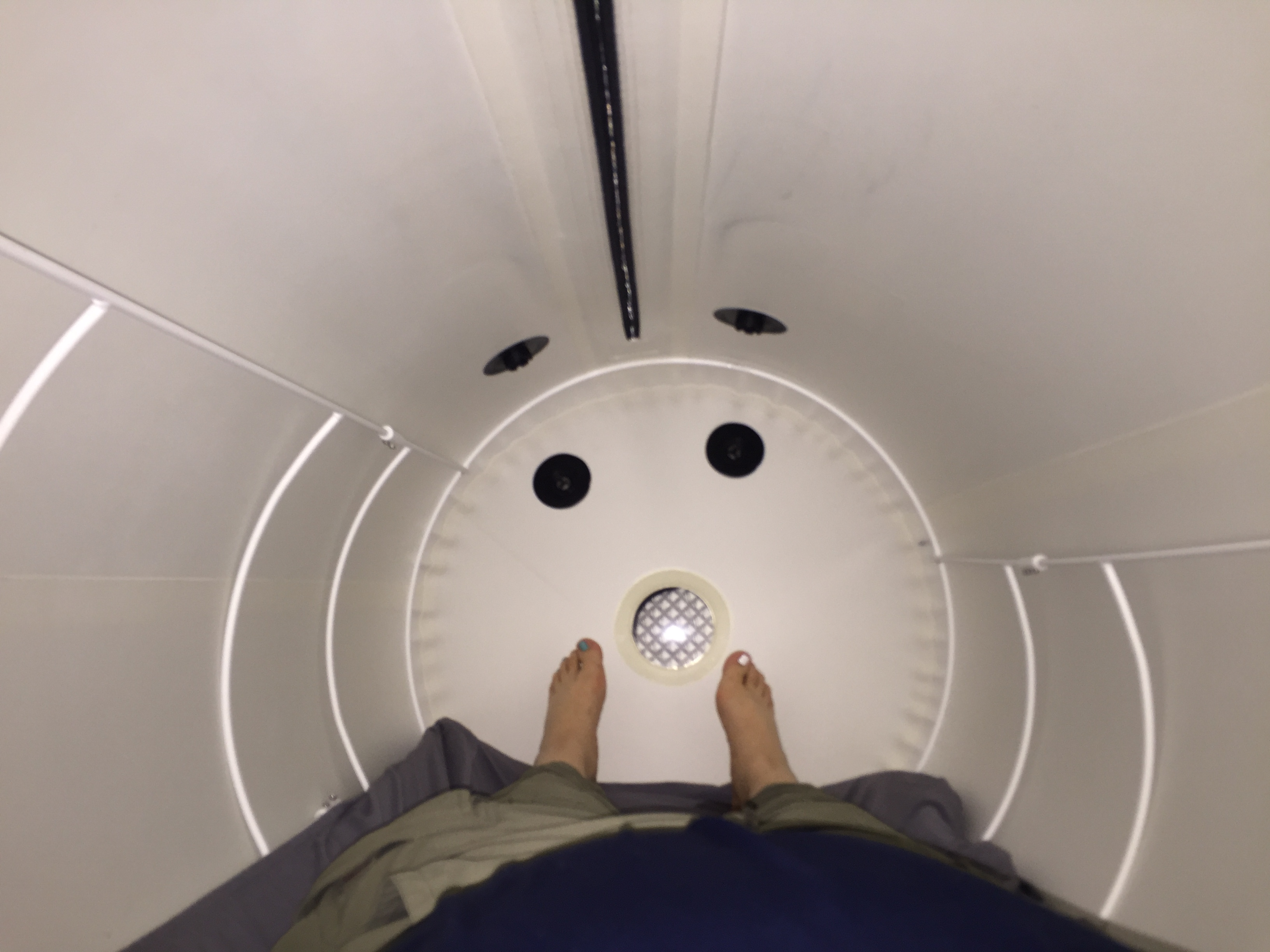
Inside of a flexible low pressure hyperbaric oxygen therapy chamber

A hyperbaric oxygen therapy chamber is used to treat patients, including divers, whose condition might improve through hyperbaric oxygen treatment. Some illnesses and injuries occur, and may linger, at the cellular or tissue level. In cases such as circulatory problems, non-healing wounds, and strokes, adequate oxygen cannot reach the damaged area and the body's healing process is unable to function properly. Hyperbaric oxygen therapy increases oxygen transport via dissolved oxygen in serum, and is most efficacious where the haemoglobin is compromised (e.g. carbon monoxide poisoning) or where the extra oxygen in solution can diffuse through tissues past embolisms that are blocking the blood supply as in decompression illness. Hyperbaric chambers capable of admitting more than one patient (multiplace) and an inside attendant have advantages for the treatment of decompression sickness (DCS) if the patient requires other treatment for serious complications or injury while in the chamber, but in most cases monoplace chambers can be successfully used for treating decompression sickness. Rigid chambers are capable of greater depth of recompression than soft chambers that are unsuitable for treating DCS.

==== Recompression chamber ====
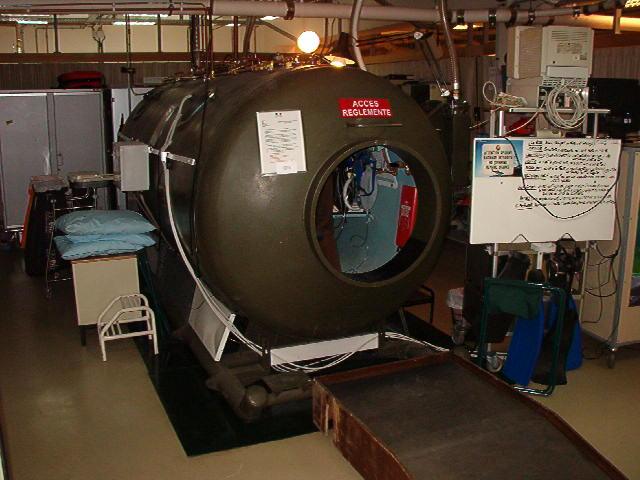
Recompression chamber

A recompression chamber is a hyperbaric treatment chamber used to treat divers suffering from certain diving disorders such as decompression sickness.

Treatment is ordered by the treating physician (medical diving officer), and generally follows one of the standard hyperbaric treatment schedules such as the US Navy treatment Tables 5 or 6.

When hyperbaric oxygen is used it is generally administered by built-in breathing systems (BIBS), which reduce contamination of the chamber gas by excessive oxygen.

===== Test of pressure =====
If the diagnosis of decompression illness is considered questionable, the diving officer may order a test of pressure. This typically consists of a recompression to 60 feet (18 m) for up to 20 minutes. If the diver notes significant improvement in symptoms, or the attendant can detect changes in a physical examination, a treatment table is followed.

===== Representative treatment tables =====
U.S. Navy Table 6 consists of compression to the depth of 60 feet (18 m) with the patient on oxygen. The diver is later decompressed to 30 feet (9.1 m) on oxygen, then slowly returned to surface pressure. This table typically takes 4 hours 45 minutes. It may be extended further. It is the most common treatment for type 2 decompression illness.

U.S. Navy Table 5 is similar to Table 6 above, but is shorter in duration. It may be used in divers with less severe complaints (type 1 decompression illness).

U.S. Navy Table 9 consists of compression to 45 feet (14 m) with the patient on oxygen, with later decompression to surface pressure. This table may be used by lower-pressure monoplace hyperbaric chambers, or as a follow-up treatment in multiplace chambers.

=== Saturation diving life support systems ===
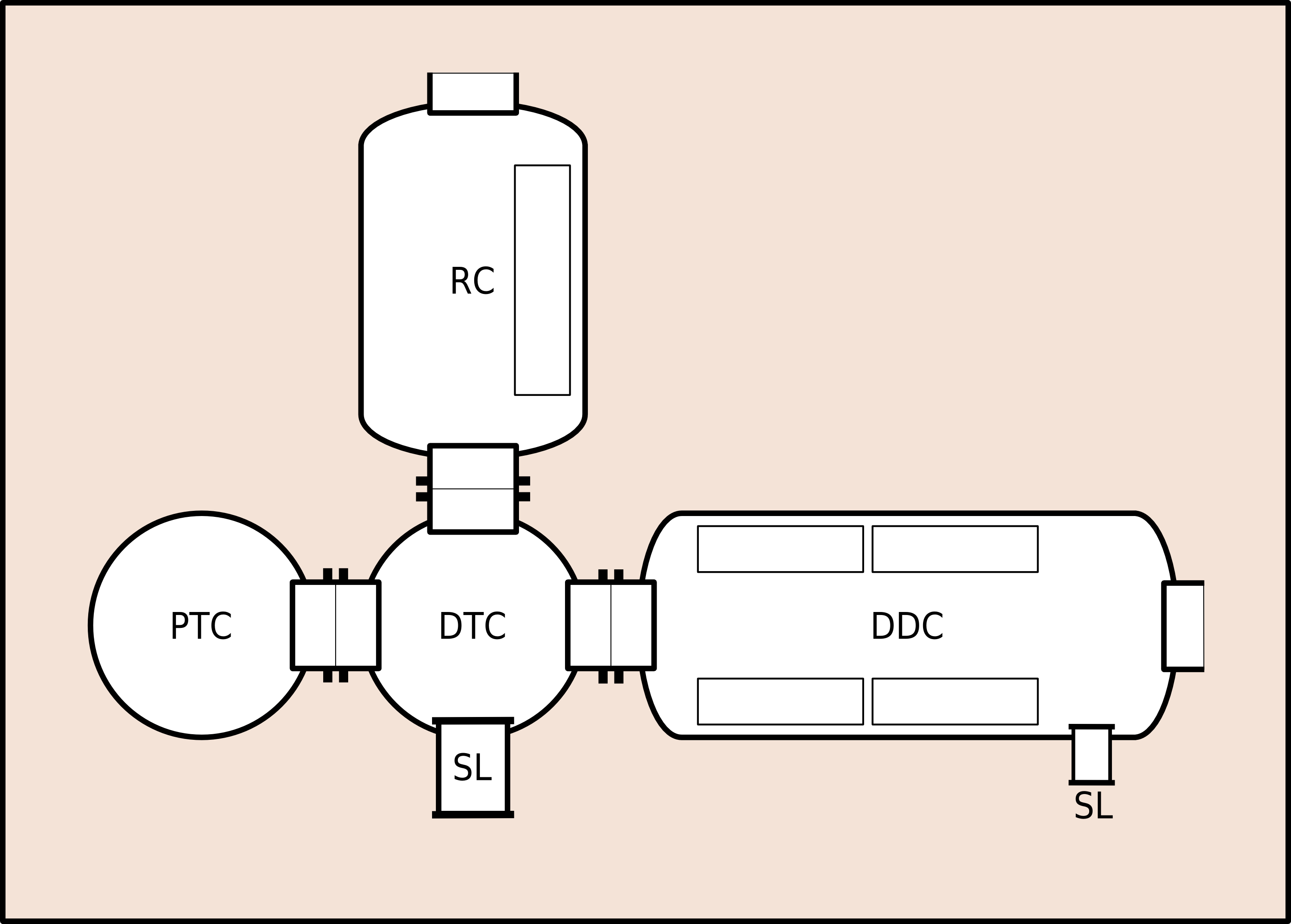
Schematic plan of a simple saturation system showing the main pressure vessels for human occupation DDC - Living chamber DTC - Transfer chamber PTC - Personnel transfer chamber (bell) RC - Recompression chamber SL - Supply lock

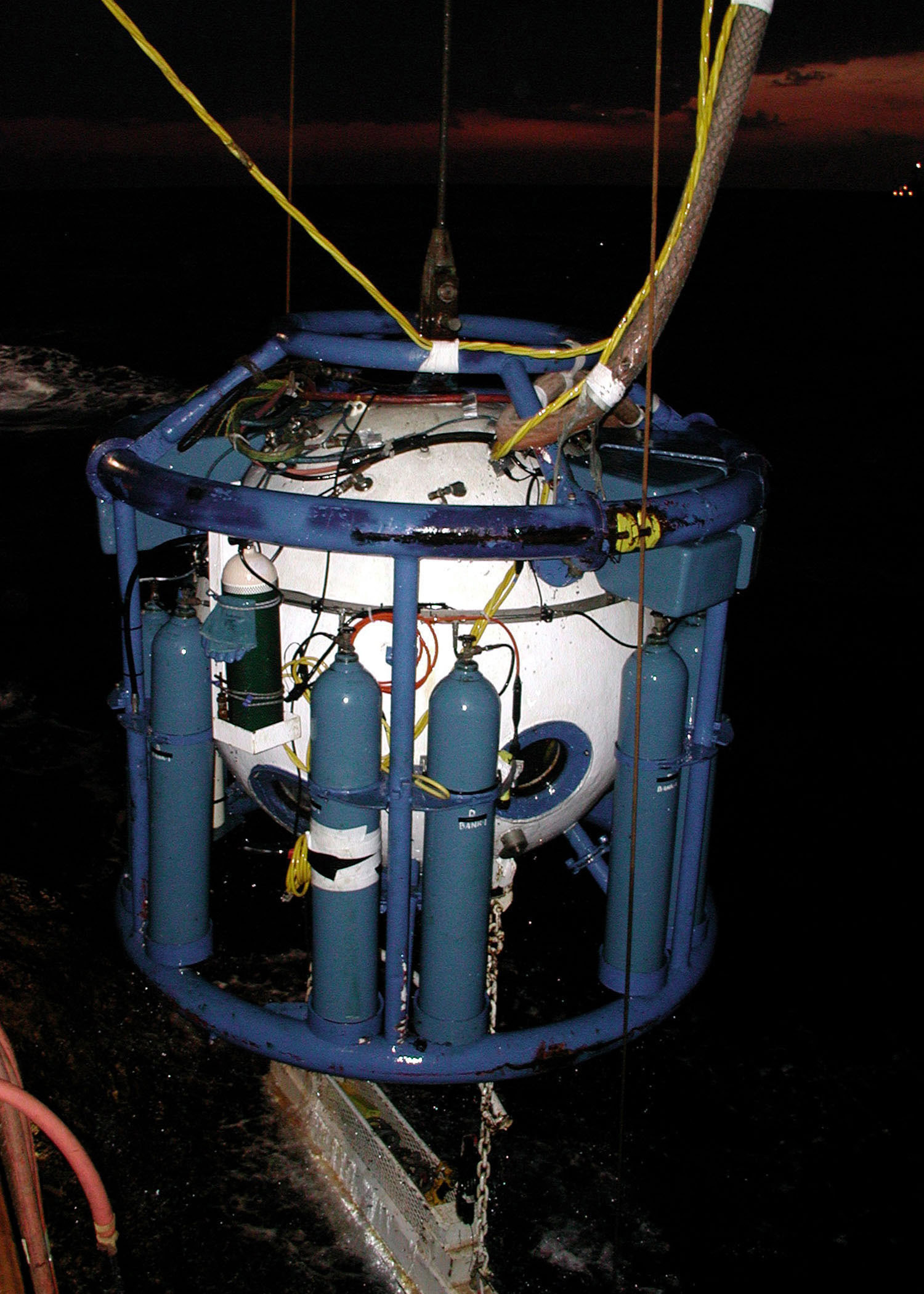
Personnel transfer capsule

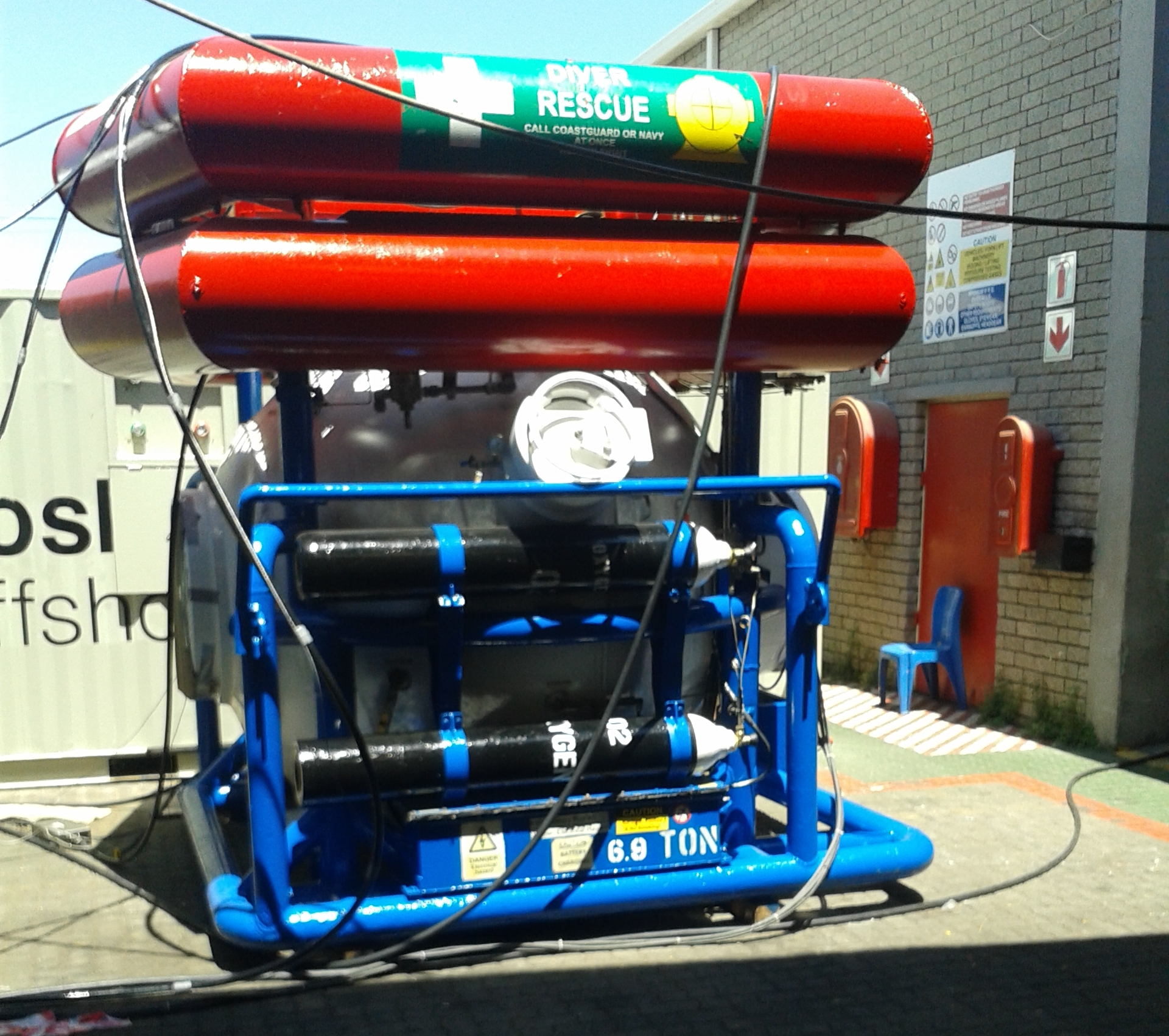
A small hyperbaric escape module

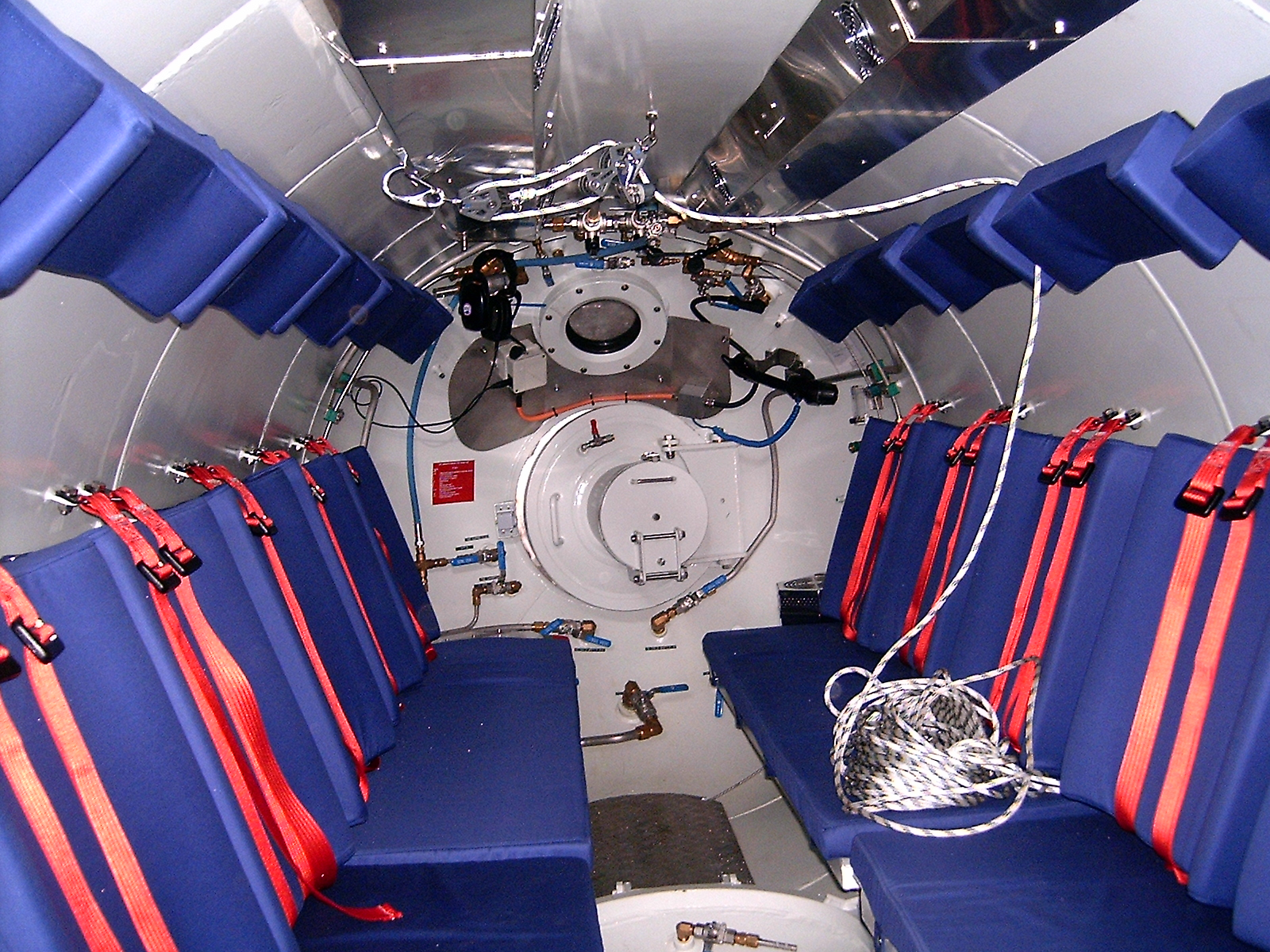
Interior of a large hyperbaric lifeboat

A hyperbaric environment on the surface comprising a set of linked pressure chambers is used in saturation diving to house divers under pressure for the duration of the project or several days to weeks, as appropriate. The occupants are decompressed to surface pressure only once, at the end of their tour of duty. This is usually done in a decompression chamber, which is part of the saturation system. The risk of decompression sickness is significantly reduced by minimizing the number of decompressions, and by decompressing at a very conservative rate.

The saturation system typically comprises a complex made up of a living chamber, transfer chamber and submersible decompression chamber, which is commonly referred to in commercial diving and military diving as the diving bell, PTC (personnel transfer capsule) or SDC (submersible decompression chamber). The system can be permanently installed on a ship or ocean platform, but is usually capable of being transferred between vessels. The system is managed from a control room, where depth, chamber atmosphere and other system parameters are monitored and controlled. The diving bell is used to transfer divers from the system to the work site. Typically, it is mated to the system utilizing a removable clamp and is separated from the system by a trunking space, through which the divers transfer to and from the bell.

The bell is fed via a large, multi-part umbilical that supplies breathing gas, electricity, communications and hot water. The bell also is fitted with exterior mounted breathing gas cylinders for emergency use. The divers operate from the bell using surface supplied umbilical diving equipment.

A hyperbaric lifeboat, hyperbaric escape module or rescue chamber may be provided for emergency evacuation of saturation divers from a saturation system. This would be used if the platform is at immediate risk due to fire or sinking to get the occupants clear of the immediate danger. A hyperbaric lifeboat is self-contained and self-sufficient for several days at sea.

=== Transfer under pressure ===
The process of transferring personnel from one hyperbaric system to another is called transfer under pressure (TUP). This is used to transfer personnel from portable recompression chambers to multi-person chambers for treatment, and between saturation life support systems and personnel transfer capsules (closed bells) for transport to and from the worksite, and for evacuation of saturation divers to a hyperbaric lifeboat.

=== Wet pot ===
Diver training and experimental work requiring exposure to relatively high ambient pressure under controllable and reproducible conditions may be done in a water-filled or partially water-filled hyperbaric chamber, referred to as a wet pot, usually accessed via a dry hyperbaric chamber at the same pressure, with airlock access to the outside. This allows convenient monitoring and instrumentation, and facilities for immediate assistance. A wet pot allows decompression algorithm validation with the divers immersed and working at specified rates while their metabolic rates are monitored.

== Hyperbaric transport ==
It is sometimes necessary to transport a diver with severe symptoms of decompression illness to a more suitable facility for treatment, or to evacuate people in a hyperbaric environment which is threatened by a high risk hazard. A hyperbaric stretcher may be useful to transport a single person, a portable chamber is intended for use transporting a casualty with a chamber attendant, and hyperbaric rescue and escape systems are used to transfer groups of people. Occasionally a closed bell may be used to transfer a small number (up to about 3) of divers between one hyperbaric facility and another when the necessary infrastructure is available.

=== Hyperbaric stretcher ===
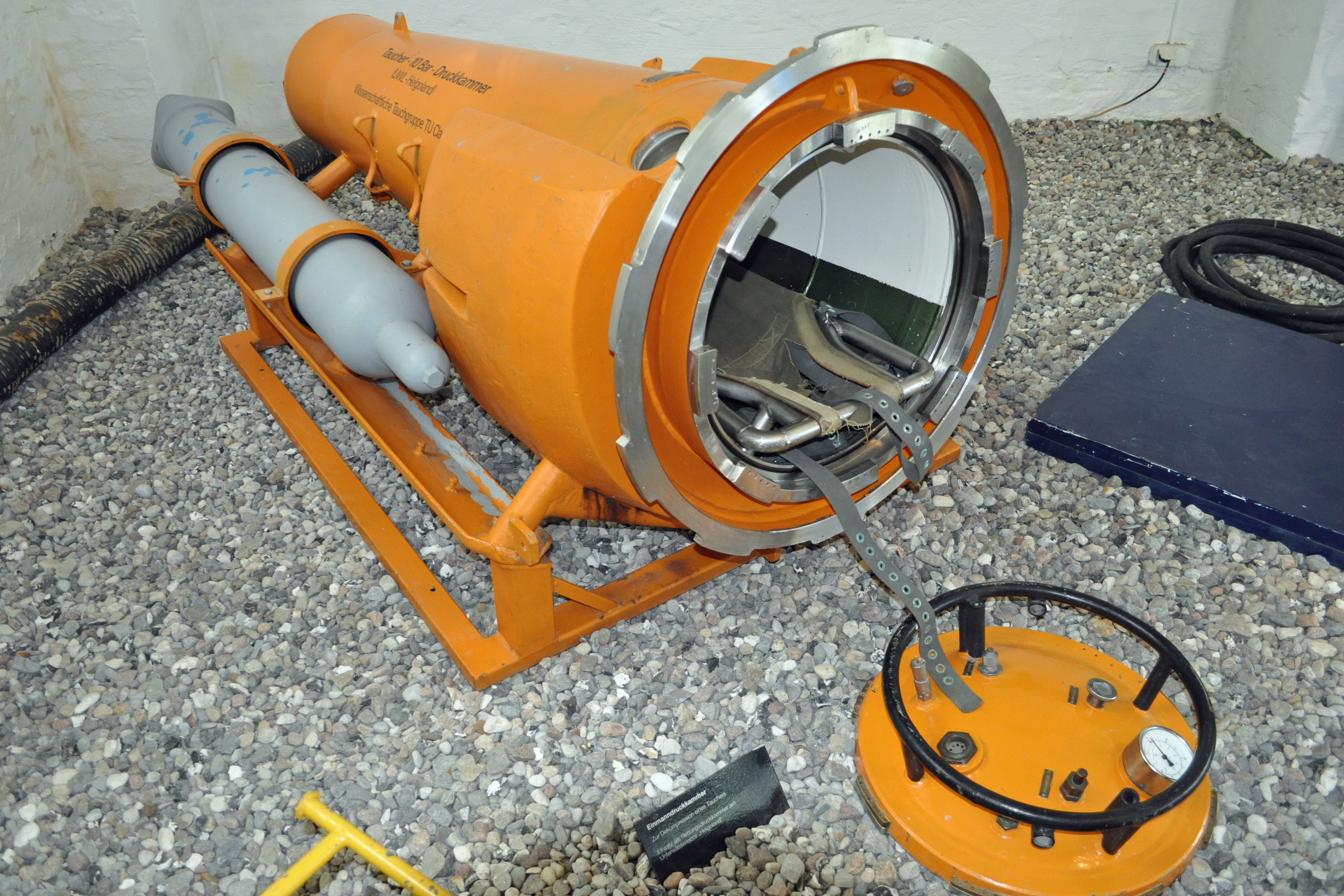
Heavy duty (10 bar) hyperbaric stretcher with hatch removed, showing locking rings for hatch and for connecting to full size chambers

A hyperbaric stretcher is a lightweight pressure vessel for human occupancy (PVHO) designed to accommodate one person undergoing initial hyperbaric treatment during or while awaiting transport or transfer to a treatment chamber.

=== Transportable recompression chamber ===
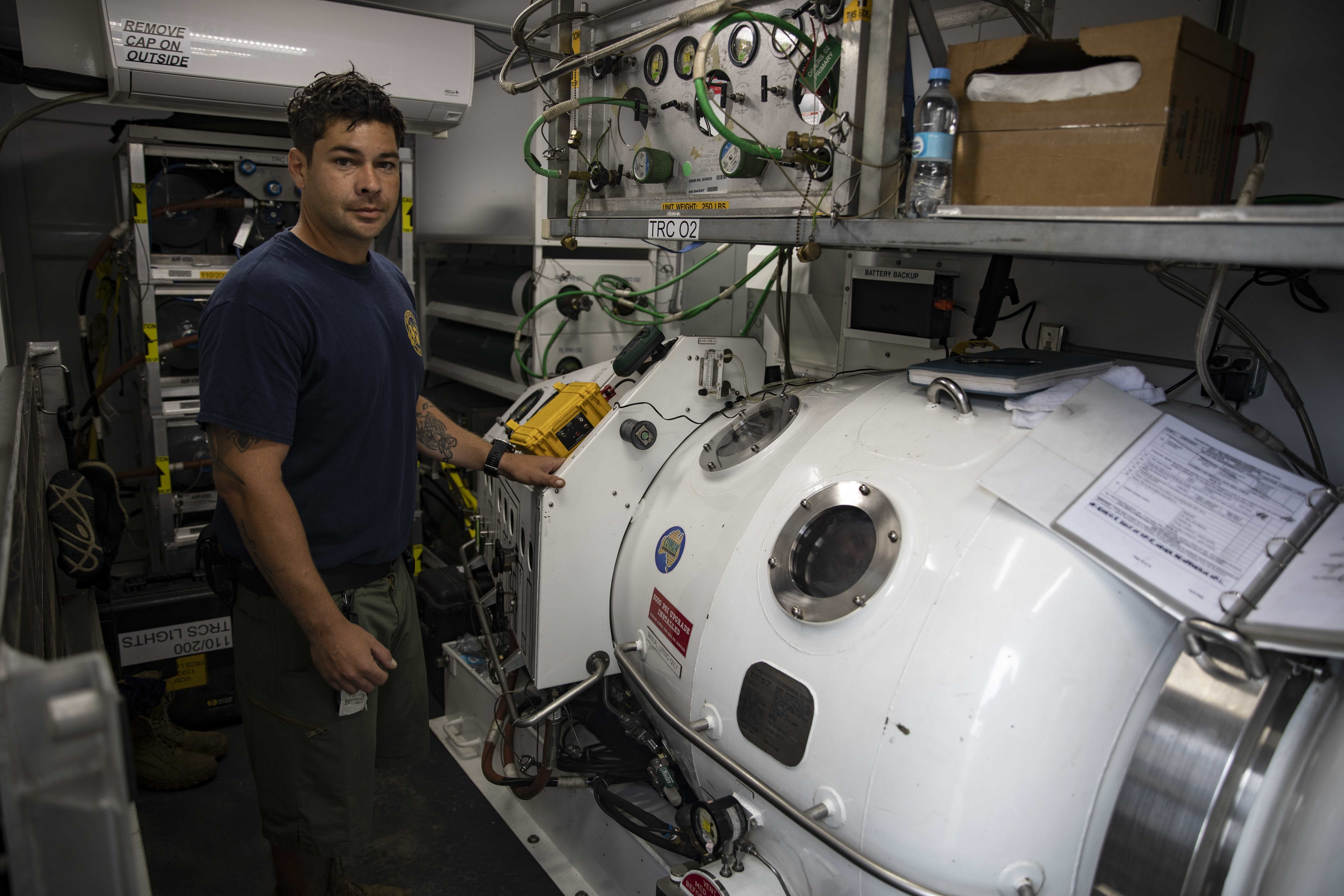
Transportable recompression chamber

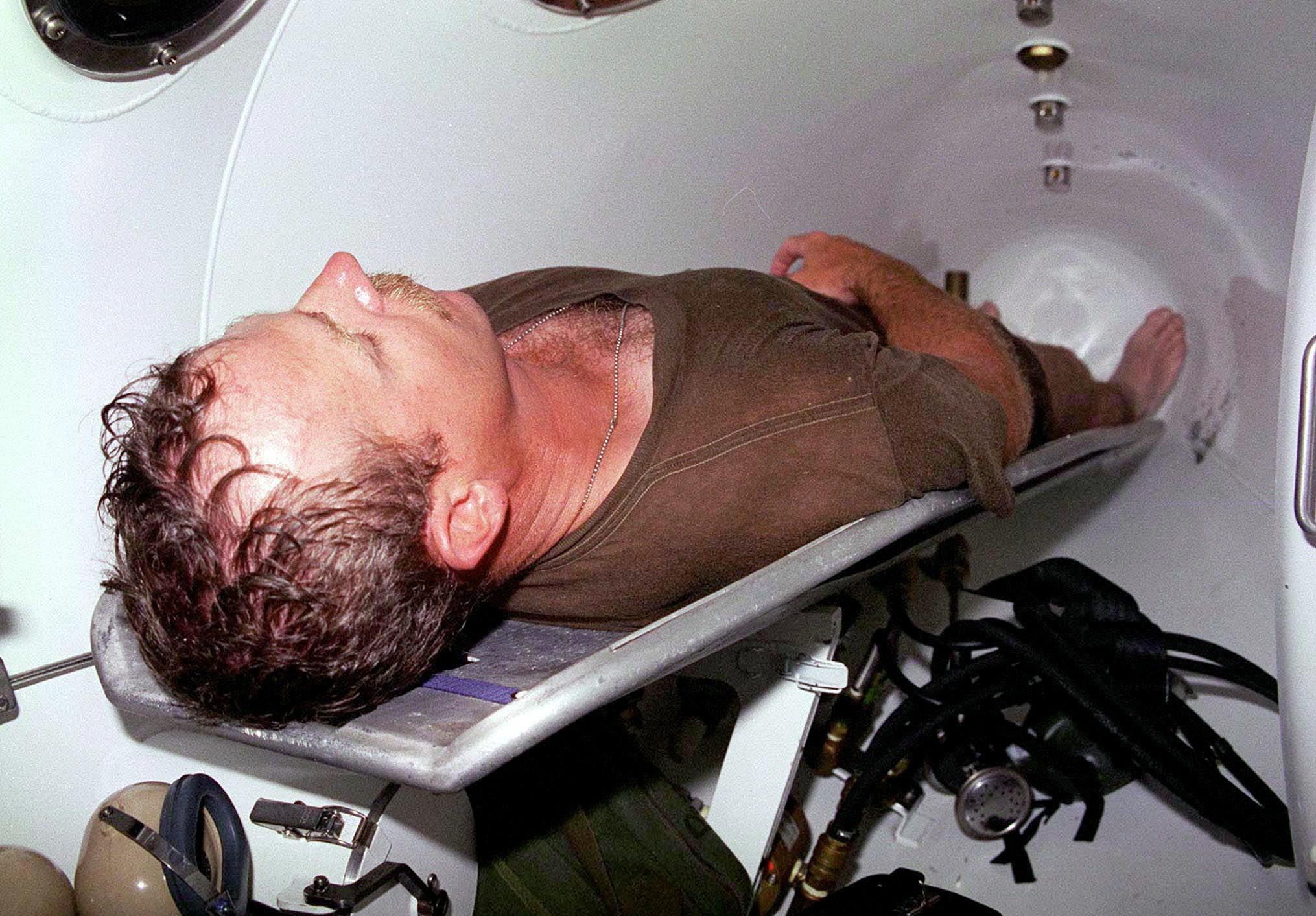
Inside a transportable recompression chamber

A transportable decompression chamber is a relatively small chamber in which a diver and an inside attendant can be transported under pressure by land, sea or air at a pressure suitable for hyperbaric treatment. The chamber is designed for transfer under pressure to a full-side decompression chamber at the destination, either directly or via a transfer chamber The US Navy Transportable Recompression Chamber System (TRCS) is an example of this type. TRCS Mod0 comprises a conical chamber called the Transportable Recompression Chamber (TRC) and a cylindrical Transfer Lock (TL), which can be connected by a NATO flange coupling, and is provided with a compressed air and oxygen supply system. The component chambers are mounted on wheeled trolleys and have a design pressure of 110 pounds per square inch (7.6 bar) gauge which is suitable for most of the US Navy treatment schedules that are relevant for bounce dives. At 1,268 pounds (575 kg) It is not truly portable by manpower in most circumstances, but the wheels make it fairly easy to move around on a horizontal surface.

=== Hyperbaric rescue and escape systems ===
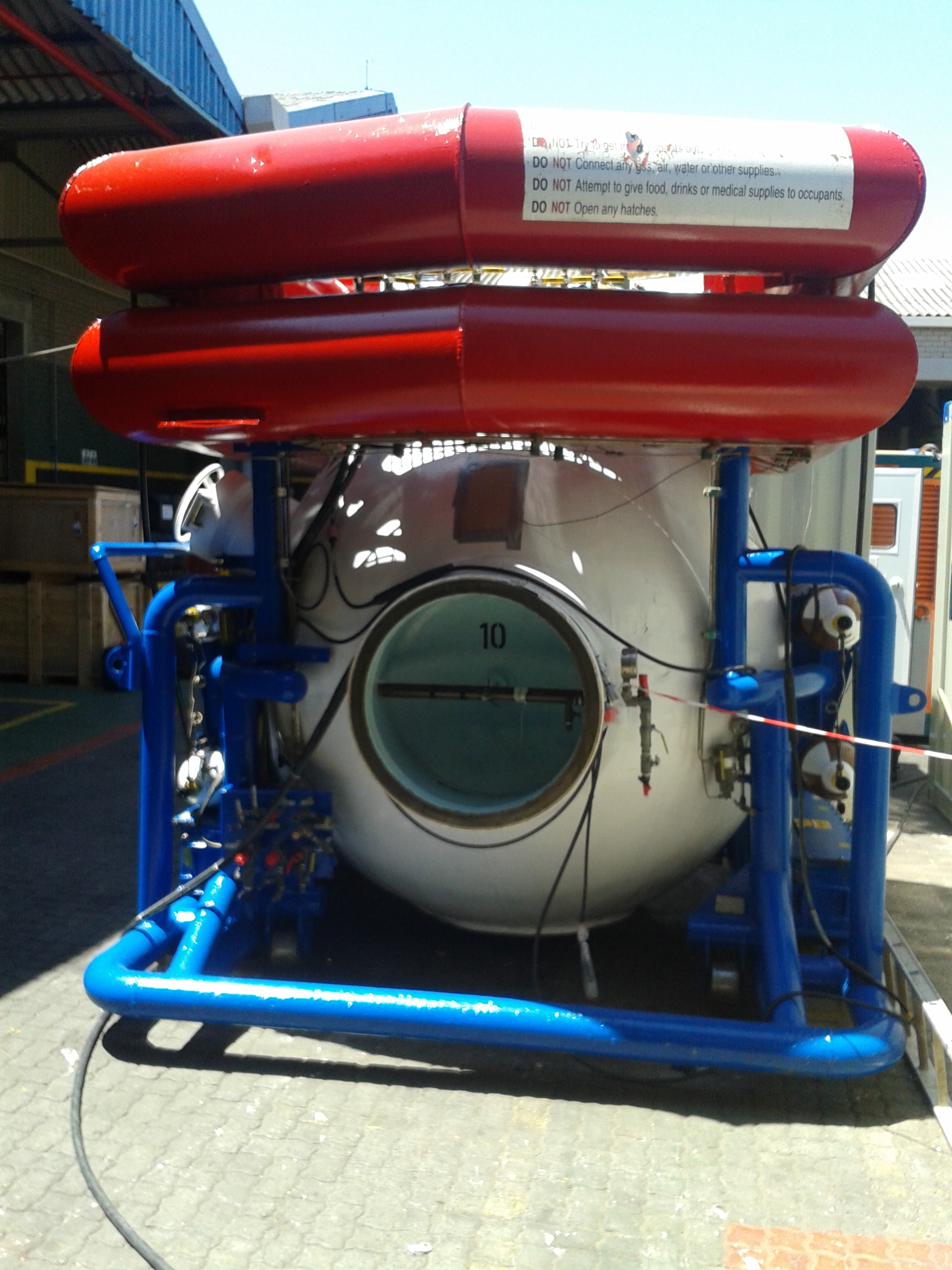
Hyperbaric escape module

A saturated diver who needs to be evacuated should preferably be transported without a significant change in ambient pressure. Hyperbaric evacuation requires pressurised transportation equipment, and could be required in a range of situations:

- The support vessel at risk of capsize or sinking.
- Unacceptable fire or explosion hazard.
- Failure of the hyperbaric life support system.
- A medical problem which cannot be dealt with on site.

A hyperbaric lifeboat or rescue chamber may be provided for emergency evacuation of saturation divers from a saturation system. This would be used if the platform is at immediate risk due to fire or sinking, and allows the divers under saturation to get clear of the immediate danger. A hyperbaric lifeboat is self-contained and can be operated by a surface pressure crew while the chamber occupants are under pressure. It must be self-sufficient for several days at sea, in case of a delay in rescue due to sea conditions. It is possible to start decompression after launching if the occupants are medically stable, but seasickness and dehydration may delay the decompression until the module has been recovered.

The rescue chamber or hyperbaric lifeboat will generally be recovered for completion of decompression due to the limited onboard life support and facilities. The recovery plan will include a standby vessel to perform the recovery.

=== Closed bell rescue and escape ===
Bell to bell transfer may be used to rescue divers from a lost or entrapped bell. A "lost" bell is a bell which has been broken free of lifting cables and umbilical; the actual position of the bell is usually still known with considerable accuracy. This will generally occur at or near the bottom, and the divers transfer between bells at ambient pressure. It is also possible in some circumstances to use a bell as a rescue chamber to transport divers from one saturation system to another. This may require temporary modifications to the bell, and is only possible if the mating flanges of the systems are compatible.

== History ==
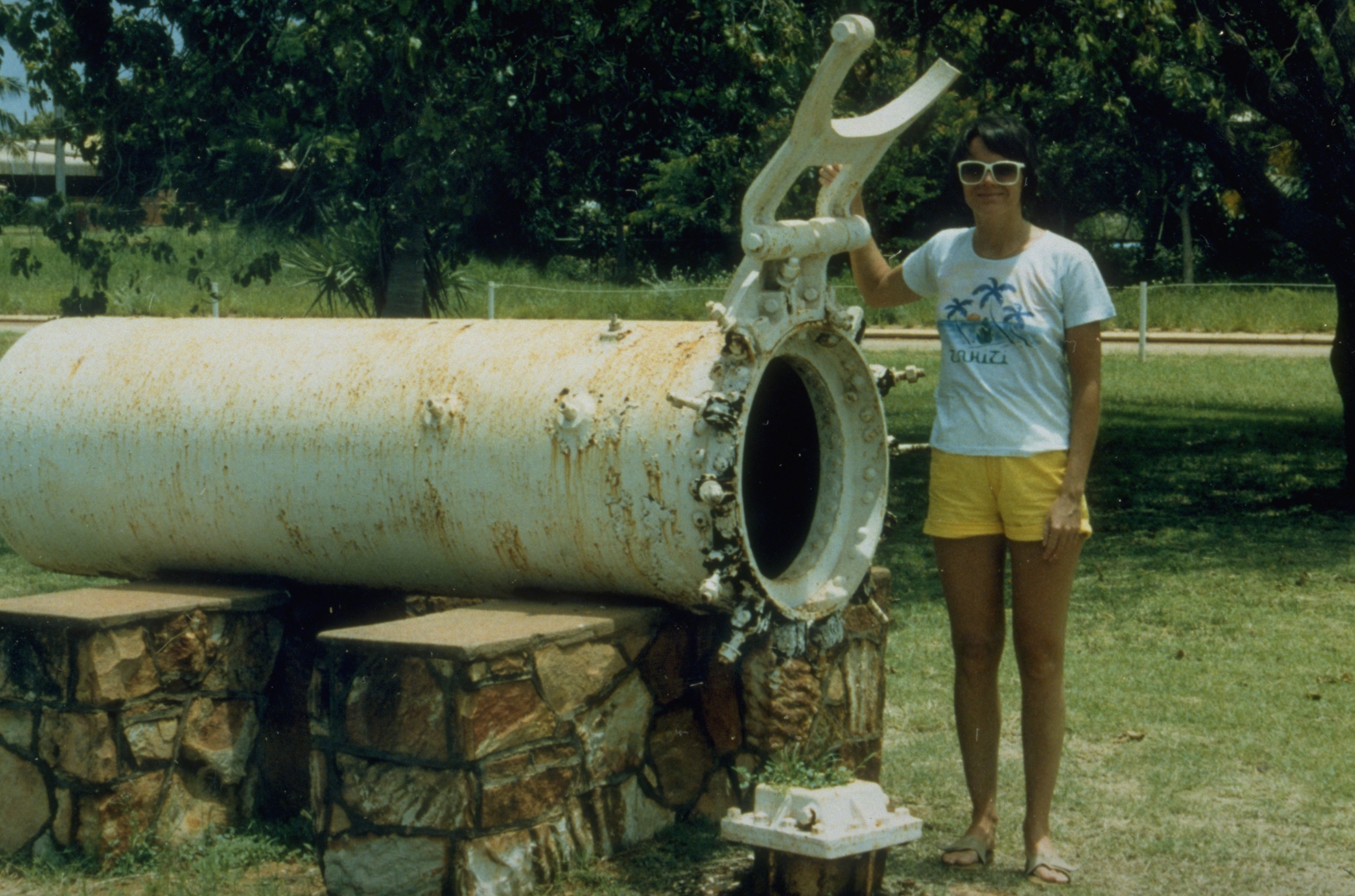
Early decompression (recompression) chamber in the park at Broome, Western Australia. The chamber is now located in the Broome Museum.

Experimental compression chambers have been used since about 1860.

In 1904, submarine engineers Siebe and Gorman, together with physiologist Leonard Hill, designed a device to allow a diver to enter a closed chamber at depth, then have the chamber – still pressurised – raised and brought aboard a boat. The chamber pressure was then reduced gradually. This preventative measure allowed divers to safely work at greater depths for longer times without developing decompression sickness.

In 1906, Hill and another English scientist M Greenwood subjected themselves to high pressure environments, in a pressure chamber built by Siebe and Gorman, to investigate the effects. Their conclusions were that an adult could safely endure seven atmospheres, provided that decompression was sufficiently gradual.

A recompression chamber intended for treatment of divers with decompression sickness was built by CE Heinke and company in 1913, for delivery to Broome, Western Australia, in 1914, where it was successfully used to treat a diver in 1915. That chamber is now in the Broome Historical Museum.

== Structure and layout ==
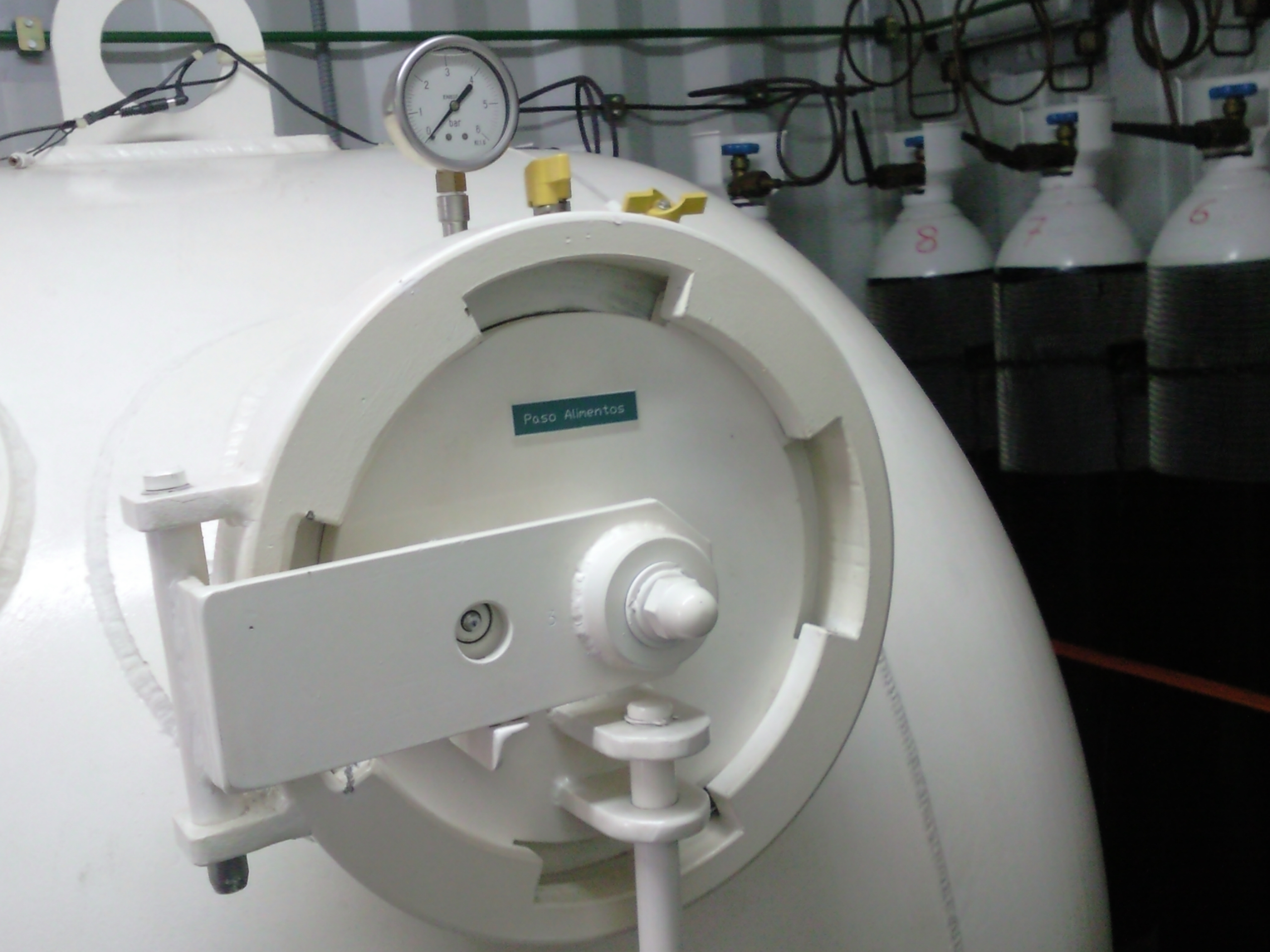
Medical lock on decompression chamber. Used to transfer medical supplies and food into and out of the chamber while it is under pressure. The door is locked by a 45 degree rotation. A safety interlock that prevents any rotation of the door while the lock is pressurised can be seen in the disengaged position, showing that it is safe to open the outer door. The gauge also shows that the pressure has been released.

The construction and layout of a hyperbaric diving chamber depends on its intended use, but there are several features common to most chambers.

There will be a pressure vessel with a chamber pressurisation and depressurisation system, access arrangements, monitoring and control systems, viewports, and often a built in breathing system for supply of alternative breathing gases.

=== Pressure vessel ===
The pressure vessel is the main structural component, and includes the shell of the main chamber, and if present, the shells of fore-chamber and medical or supply lock. A forechamber or entry lock may be present to provide personnel access to the main chamber while it is under pressure. A medical or stores lock may be present to provide access to the main chamber for small items while under pressure. The small volume allows quick and economical transfer of small items, as the gas lost has relatively small volume compared to the forechamber.

In the United States, the engineering safety standards is the American Society of Mechanical Engineers (ASME) Pressure Vessels for Human Occupancy (PVHO). There is a design code (PVHO-1) and a post-construction, or maintenance & operations, code (PVHO-1). The pressure vessel as a whole is generally to the ASME Boiler and Pressure Vessel Code, Section VIII. These PVHO safety codes focus on the systems aspect of the chambers such as life support requirements as well as the acrylic windows. The PVHO code addresses hyperbaric medical systems, commercial diving systems, submarines, and pressurized tunnel boring machines.

=== Access doors ===
An access door or hatch is normally hinged inward and held closed by the pressure differential, but it may also be dogged for a better seal at low pressure. There is a door or hatch at the access opening to the forechamber, the main chamber, both ends of a medical or stores lock, and at any trunking to connect multiple chambers. A closed bell has a similar hatch at the bottom for use underwater and may have a side hatch for transfer under pressure to a saturation system, or may use the bottom hatch for this purpose. The external door to the medical lock is unusual in that it opens outward and is not held closed by the internal pressure, so it needs a safety interlock system to make it impossible to open when the lock is pressurised.

=== Viewports ===
Viewports are generally provided to allow the operating personnel to visually monitor the occupants, and can be used for hand signalling as an auxiliary emergency communications method. The major components are the window (transparent acrylic), the window seat (holds the acrylic window), and retaining ring. Interior lighting can be provided by mounting lights outside the viewports. These are a pressure vessel feature specific to PVHOs due to the need to see the people inside and evaluate their health. Section 2 of the engineering safety code ASME PVHO-1 is used internationally for designing viewports. This includes medical chambers, commercial diving chambers, decompression chambers, and pressurized tunnel boring machines. Non-military submarines use acrylic viewports for seeing their surroundings and operating any attached equipment. Other material have been attempted, such as glass or synthetic saphhire, but they would consistently fail to maintain their seal at high pressures and cracks would progress rapidly to catastrphophic failure. Acrylic is more likely to have small cracks the operators can see and have time to take mitigation steps instead of failing catastrophically.

=== Furniture ===
Furniture is usually provided for the comfort of the occupants. Usually there are seats and/or bed facilities. Saturation systems also have tables and sanitary facilities for the occupants.

=== Pressure system ===
The internal pressure system includes a primary and reserve chamber gas supply, and the valves and piping to control it to pressurise and depressurise the main chamber and auxiliary compartments, and a pressure relief valve to prevent pressurisation beyond the design maximum working pressure. Valves are generally duplicated inside and outside and are labelled to avoid confusion. It is usually possible to operate a multiple occupant chamber from inside in an emergency. The monitoring equipment will vary depending on the purpose of the chamber, but will include pressure gauges for supply gas, and an accurately calibrated pressure gauge for the internal pressure of all human occupied compartments.

A clearly visible dedicated pressure gauge and vent valve must be provided for all hyperbaric trunking and locks that may be closed at both ends, so that outside support staff can be sure that the internal space is depressurised before attempting to disconnect joints.

=== Communications ===
There will also be a voice communications system between the operator and occupants. This is usually push to talk on the outside, and constantly transmitting from the inside, so that the operator can better monitor the condition of the occupants. There may also be a backup communications system.

=== Safety ===
Firefighting equipment is necessary as a chamber fire is extremely dangerous to the occupants. Either fire extinguishers specially made for hyperbaric environment with non-toxic contents, or a pressurised internal water spray system can be used. Water buckets are often provided as additional equipment.

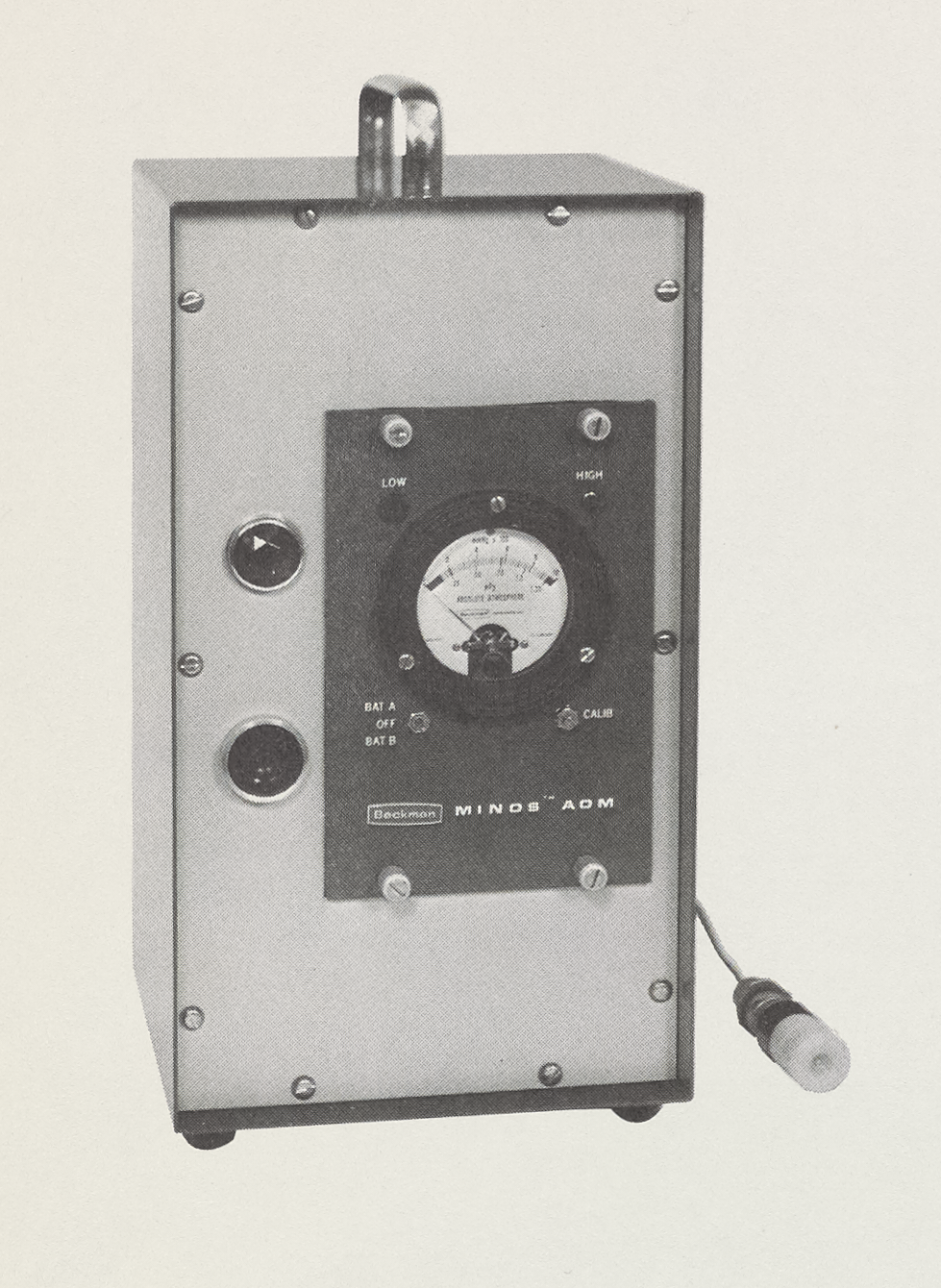
Oxygen Monitor for Hyperbaric Chamber, 1969

A caisson gauge is a high precision (typically 0.25% to 1% of full gauge scale) pressure gauge fitted to measure pressure of the interior of a chamber relative to ambient atmospheric pressure, and pressure differences between compartments of a sealed habitat separated by airlock hatches or doors, originally in the main pressurised compartment of a hyperbaric caisson, and a required instrument on diving chambers. A caisson gauge is also the type used on a pneumofathometer to monitor diver depth, and is commonly calibrated in msw or fsw for convenient reference to decompression tables.

Accurate monitoring of the pressure in the chamber and associated airlocks is essential for the safety of the occupants and for safe and effective decompression. It is also necessary for safe operation of locks and disconnection of trunking in saturation habitats and after transfer under pressure. Mechanical interlocks that prevent opening airlocks or disconnecting trunking when there is a pressure differential may also be required by law or code of practice.

=== Life support ===
Life support systems for saturation systems can be fairly complex, as the occupants must remain under pressure continuously for several day to weeks. Oxygen content of the chamber gas is constantly monitored and fresh oxygen added when necessary to maintain the nominal value. Chamber gas may be simply vented and flushed if it is air, but helium mixtures are expensive and over long periods very large volumes would be needed, so the chamber gas of a saturation system is recycled by passing it through a carbon dioxide scrubber and other filters to remove odours and excess moisture. Multiplace chambers that may be used for treatment usually contain a built-in breathing system (BIBS) for supply of breathing gas different from the pressurisation gas, and closed bells contain an analogous system to supply gas to the divers' umbilicals. Chambers with BIBS will generally have an oxygen monitor. BIBS are also used as an emergency breathing gas supply if the chamber gas is contaminated.

=== Sanitation ===
Sanitation systems for washing and waste removal are required. Discharge is simple because of the pressure gradient, but must be controlled to avoid undesired chamber pressure loss or fluctuations. Catering is generally provided by preparing the food and drink outside and transferring it into the chamber through the stores lock, which is also used to transfer used utensils, laundry and other supplies.

=== Construction ===
Non-portable chambers are generally constructed from steel, as it is inexpensive, strong and fire resistant. Portable chambers have been constructed from steel, aluminium alloy, and fibre reinforced composites. In some cases the composite material structure is flexible when depressurised.

== Operation ==
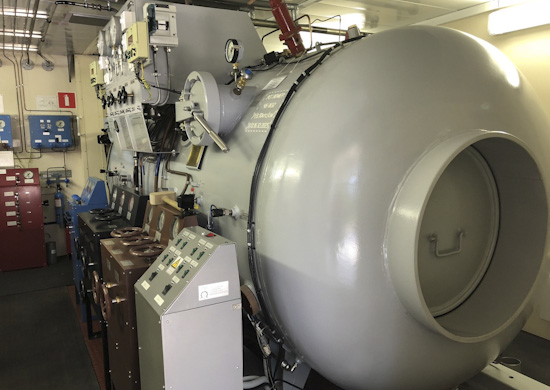
Diving barocomplex Savior of the Pacific Fleet of Russia

Details will vary depending on the application. A generalised sequence for a stand-alone chamber is described. The operator of a commercial diving decompression chamber is generally called a chamber operator, and the operator of a saturation system is called a life support technician (LST).

- Pre-use checks will be conducted on the system to ensure that it is safe to operate.
- The intended occupants will be checked and authorised for compression, and will enter the chamber.
- The pressure door will be closed, communications established with the occupants, and pressurisation, also known as blowdown, started.
- The operator will monitor and control the rate of pressurisation and monitor the condition of the occupants.
- Once pressurised, the operator will monitor the pressure, the run time, the chamber gas and if applicable, the independent breathing gas supply. The chamber gas quality may be controlled by carbon dioxide scrubber systems, filters and air conditioner systems and addition of oxygen as required, or by periodic or continuous ventilation by adding fresh compressed air while simultaneously releasing some of the chamber air.
- When decompression is started, the operator will notify the occupants and release chamber gas to the atmosphere or to scavenge pumps if it to be recycled. The rate of pressure reduction is controlled to follow the specified decompression schedule within tolerance.
- Compression and decompression may be interrupted if the occupants experience problems caused by the pressure change, such as ear or sinus squeezes, or symptoms of decompression illness.
- When decompression is completed, chamber pressure is equalised with ambient pressure and the doors may be opened. Occupants may exit, and will usually be checked for absence of ill-effects.
- The chamber will receive post-operation service as required to be ready for the next operation or for storage as applicable.

=== Working pressure ===
A large range of working pressures are used, depending on the application of the chamber. Hyperbaric oxygen therapy is usually done at pressures not exceeding 18 msw, or an absolute internal pressure of 2.8 bar. Decompression chambers are usually rated for depths similar to the depths that the divers will encounter during planned operations. Chambers using air as the chamber atmosphere are frequently rated to depths in the range of 50 to 90 msw, and chambers, closed bells and other components of saturation systems must be rated for at least the planned operational depth. The US Navy has Heliox saturation decompression schedules for depths up to 480 msw (1600 fsw). Experimental chambers may be rated for deeper depths. An experimental dive has been done to 701 msw (2300 fsw), so at least one chamber has been rated to at least this depth.

== Inspection, maintenance and testing ==
There are three grades of safety inspection required for windows and viewports:

- Operational inspection of the inner and outer surfaces is included in the checks before first pressurisation of the day by a competent chamber operator, and ensures that the surfaces have not been damaged since the last use.
- Maintenance inspection is done at specified intervals by a qualified maintenance inspector. This inspection is more thorough and may require removal of the window from the mounting to check for damage that is not visible when installed. This grade of inspection is generally also required for re-commissioning a chamber that has been out of service for longer than a specified period.
- Seat and seal inspection is done whenever a window has been removed for inspection or repair or a new window installed.

The window is examined to detect crazing, cracks, blisters, discolouration, scratches or pits.

== See also ==
- Byford Dolphin (decompression accident)
- Decompression sickness – Disorder caused by dissolved gases forming bubbles in tissues
- Diving bell – Chamber for transporting divers vertically through the water
- Glossary of underwater diving terminology
- Hyperbaric medicine – Medical treatment at raised ambient pressure
- Hyperbaric stretcher – Portable pressure vessel to transport a person under pressure
- Moon pool – Opening in the base of a hull, platform, or chamber giving access to the water below
- Saturation diving – Diving mode and decompression technique
- Surface-supplied diving – Underwater diving breathing gas supplied from the surface
