= Hyperbaric stretcher =

Portable pressure vessel to transport a person under pressure

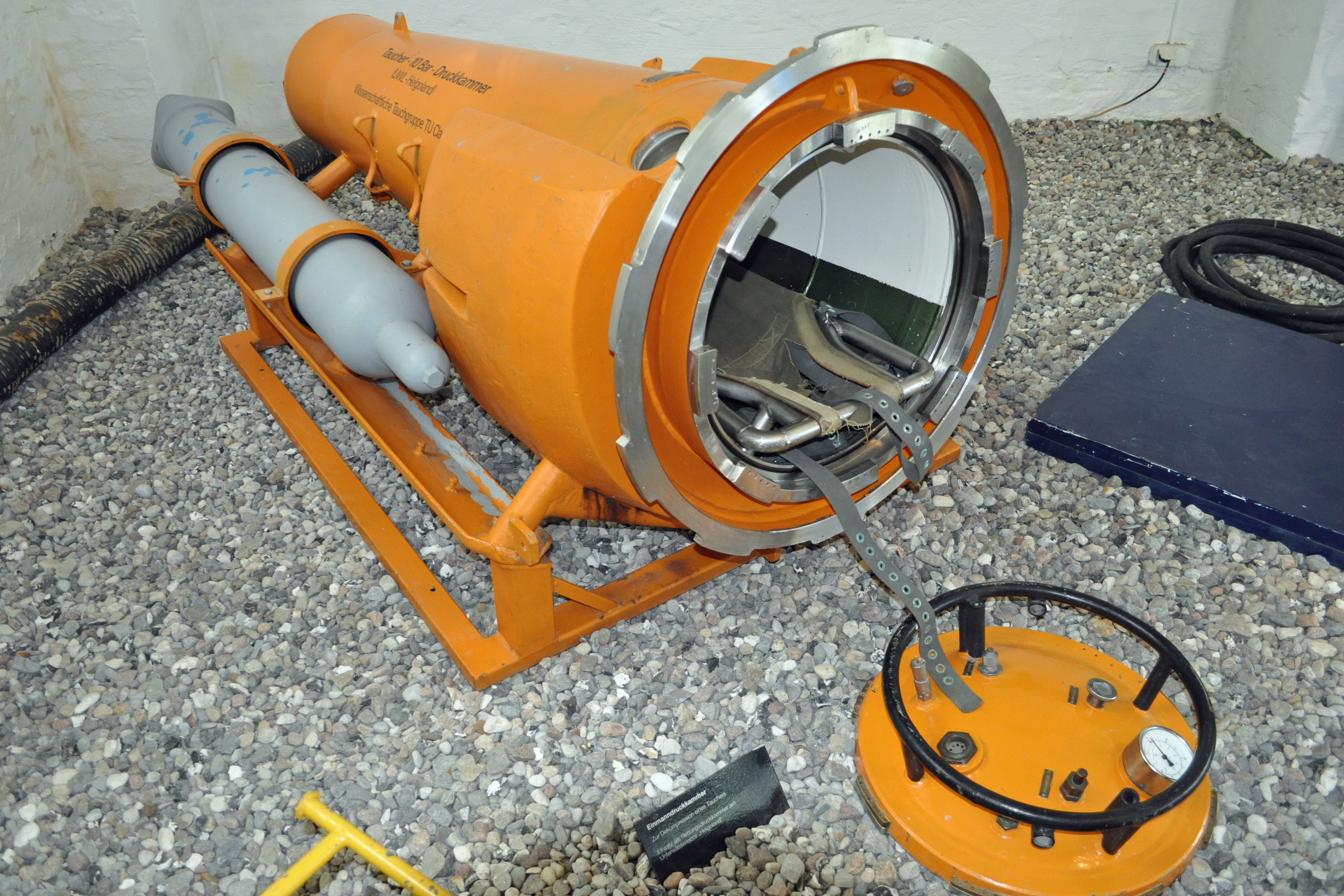
Heavy duty (10 bar) hyperbaric stretcher with hatch removed, showing locking rings for hatch and for connecting to full size chambers

A hyperbaric stretcher is a lightweight pressure vessel for human occupancy (PVHO) designed to accommodate one person undergoing initial hyperbaric treatment during or while awaiting transport or transfer to a treatment chamber.

Originally developed as advanced diving equipment, it has since been used for other medical conditions such as altitude sickness, carbon monoxide poisoning and smoke inhalation, air and gas embolism and is viewed as potentially important equipment for the early treatment of blast related injuries within the combat zone with the anticipated benefit that traumatic brain injury may not develop in the ensuing months.

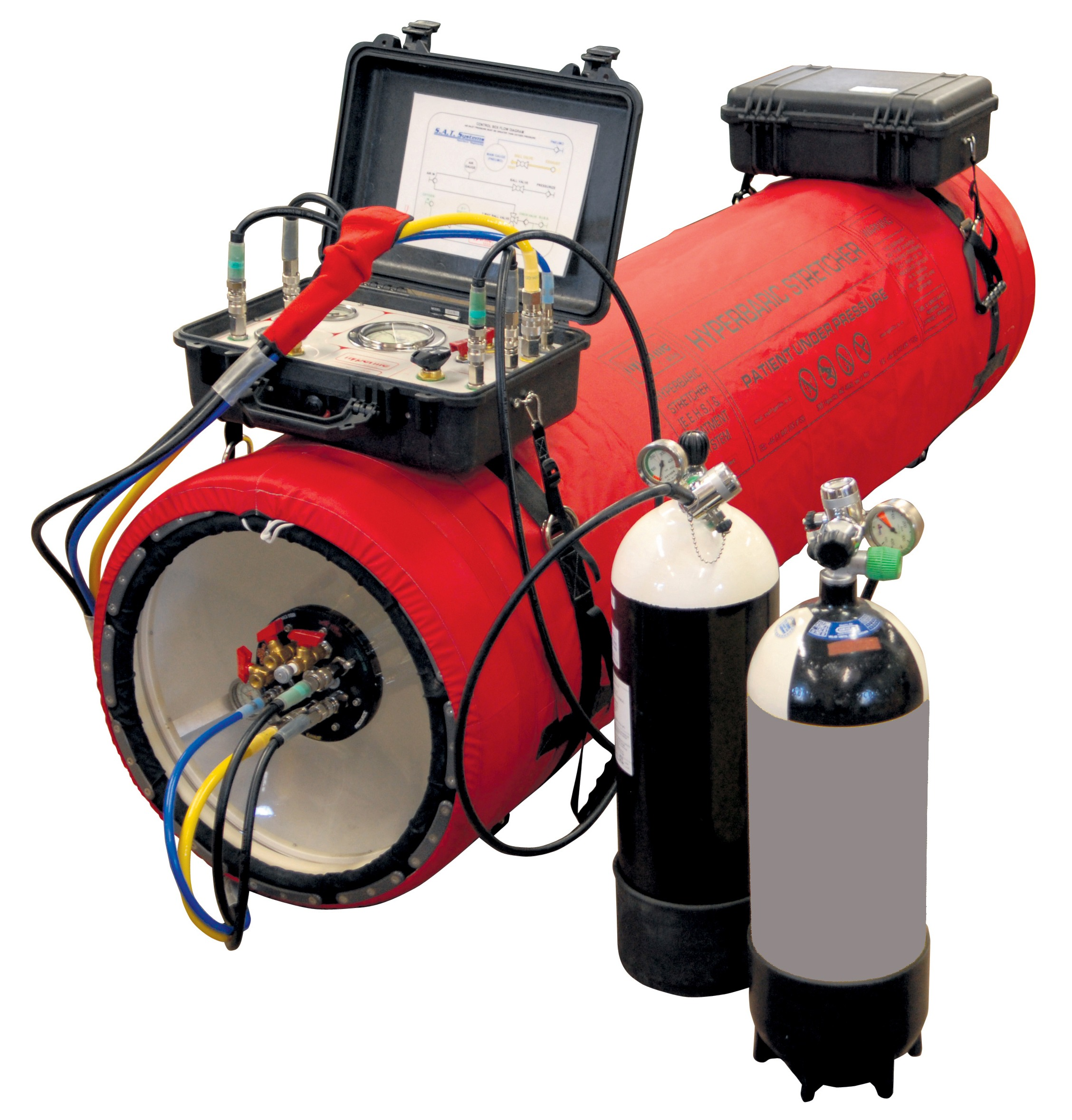
Hyperlite 1 single-person hyperbaric stretcher/flexible chamber

There is currently only one unit approved as Case 12 under the US National Standard - ASME PVHO-1 (2019). This unit, known as the SOS Hyperlite or by the US military as the EEHS (Emergency Evacuation Hyperbaric Stretcher) is, or has been, in service with the US Army, Navy, Air Force, Coast Guard, NOAA and NASA as well as being supplied to other Government Agencies. The EEHS has a length of 2.26 metres (89 inches) and a diameter of 59 cm. (23.5 inches) and operates at a pressure of up to 2.3 bar (33 psi) above ambient pressure with a built-in safety factor of over 6:1. It is pressurised with air and the occupant breathes oxygen or air through a demand mask (BIBS) during treatment.

It has applications in military, commercial, scientific, and recreational diving, and in hyperbaric medicine. It is made of flexible material and when the internal pressure matches the external pressure, it is collapsible, which can make transfer under pressure possible with relatively small hyperbaric chambers.

A hyperbaric stretcher must be portable, and should be compatible with transfer under pressure to and from full size hyperbaric chambers. This can be achieved by making the unit small enough to be loaded into the hyperbaric facility for transfer under pressure, or by providing a mating flange compatible with the larger chamber, via an adapter if necessary. Some treatments may be performed on the hyperbaric stretcher, provided the patient is sufficiently fit for unattended recompression.
