= Glossary of underwater diving terminology: H–O =

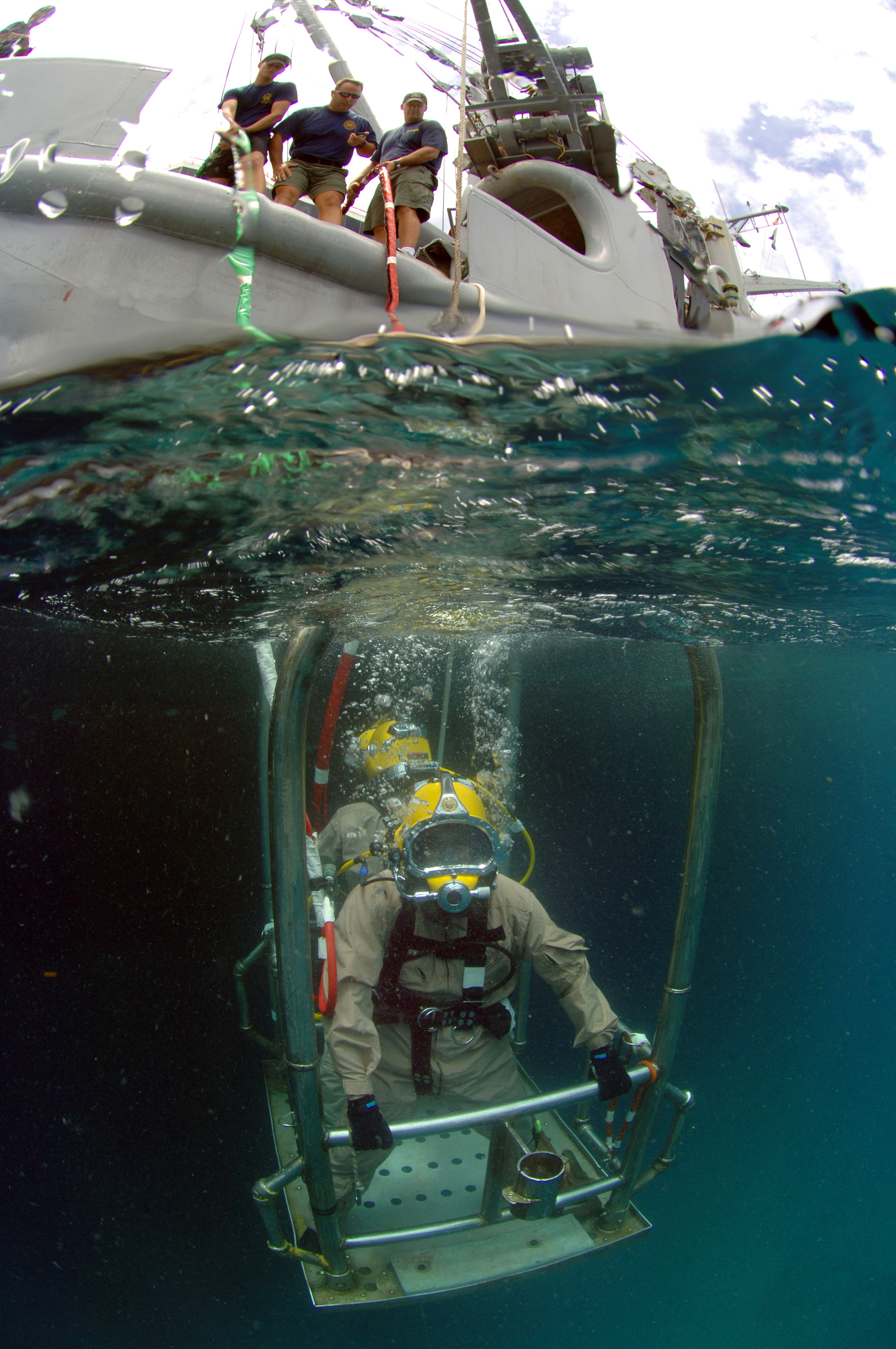
Surface-supplied divers riding a stage to the underwater workplace

This is a glossary of technical terms, jargon, diver slang and acronyms used in underwater diving. The definitions listed are in the context of underwater diving. There may be other meanings in other contexts.

The appeal of underwater diving as a human activity is usually associated with the view into an underwater environment that is typically inaccessible in daily life on land. Practitioners submerge below the surface of the water for a range of purposes, such as recreation, underwater photography, exploration of marine biology and nautical archaeology, search for shipwrecks, and other types of research.

Underwater divers may use no equipment at all, or a wide range of equipment which may include breathing apparatus, environmental protective clothing, aids to vision, communication, propulsion, maneuverability, buoyancy and safety equipment, and tools for the task at hand.

Many of the terms are in general use by English speaking divers from many parts of the world, both amateur and professional, and using any of the modes of diving. Others are more specialised, variable by location, mode, or professional environment. There are instances where a term may have more than one meaning depending on context, and others where several terms refer to the same concept, or there are variations in spelling. A few are loan-words from other languages.

There are five sub-glossaries, listed here. The tables of content should link between them automatically:

- Glossary of underwater diving terminology: A–C
- Glossary of underwater diving terminology: D–G
- Glossary of underwater diving terminology: H–O
- Glossary of underwater diving terminology: P–S
- Glossary of underwater diving terminology: T–Z

== H ==
Contents: Top	A	B	C	D	E	F	G	H	I	J	K	L	M	N	O	P	Q	R	S	T	U	V	W	X	Y	Z	References

Subsection: Top, Ha, He, Hi, Ho, Hu

== Ha ==
habitat

An underwater structure inside which divers can carry out dry welding or which is fitted out with life support facilities.
Haldanean
Haldanian

Decompression models based on the principles described by John Scott Haldane.
half+200
half+15

An alternative scuba reserve gas management strategy to the rule of thirds for breathing stage cylinders. The cylinder is breathed down to half of its starting pressure plus 200 psi (or 15 bar), so that a stage cylinder filled to 3000 psi would be breathed down to 1700 psi before being dropped. Primary cylinder gas (usually back gas) is retained for use in contingencies.
half duplex

Voice communications system where users take turns to send and receive.
half mask

Diver's mask which covers the eyes and nose but not the mouth.
half times

halocline

A strong variation in salinity over a small depth range within a body of water. Often visible as a blurred or shimmering region due to uneven refractive index.
hand-off cylinder
A diving cylinder, complete with regulator, which can be handed off (manually transferred) to another diver in an emergency, so that the two divers are not obliged to remain in close proximity during the exit and ascent. Transfer of a hand-off cylinder should not compromise either diver's buoyancy to the extent that they cannot make a normal, controlled ascent at neutral buoyancy.
hang
To remain stationary at a specific depth and location, particularly when decompressing.
hang-off
hang off

Commercial diving procedure where the diver ascends to a shallower depth to minimise in-gassing during periods of waiting for surface support. The diver generally ascends to 30 ft waiting depth, and bottom time at that depth is not counted towards decompression obligation. When the support is ready, the diver returns to working depth and time elapsed from leaving hang-off depth accumulates towards decompression obligation. The profile appearance approximates a square wave form, or yo-yo profile.
hang tank
Cylinder of decompression gas staged at the appropriate depth on the shotline, decompression trapeze, directly suspended from the boat, or guideline for emergency use.
hard hat diving
Surface supplied diving, generally in professional diving, either wearing a modern diving helmet or the old-style standard diving dress with copper helmet.
hardwire communications
Voice communications using a cable for transmission.
harness
Straps and webbing with associated buckles, D-rings and other accessories used to support the breathing apparatus and secure it to the diver. The harness often has other functions such as supporting weighting and buoyancy control systems and for recovery of the diver from the water. In professional diving the harness is used as a strong point to attach the lifeline or umbilical to the diver.
hat
Commercial diver term for diving helmet.
HAZID
Hazard identification study: A systematic qualitative assessment of potential hazards and threats to health, safety, equipment, property, environment, production, or reputation. May be followed by a risk assessment.
hazmat diving

Diving in a known hazardous materials environment. The environment may be contaminated by hazardous materials, the diving medium may be inherently a hazardous material, or the environment in which the diving medium is situated may include hazardous materials with a significant risk of exposure to these materials to members of the diving team. Special precautions, equipment and procedures are associated with hazmat diving.

Subsection: Top, Ha, He, Hi, Ho, Hu

== He ==
head-up display

A visual display mounted where it is normally in the diver's field of vision.
Health and Safety Executive

UK government department responsible for occupational diver safety in UK.
heavy gear

heliair

Trimix blends made by topping up helium with air.
helicopter turn
Manoeuver in which a horizontally trimmed diver uses small fin movements to rotate on the spot on a vertical axis.
heliox

Mixtures of helium and oxygen for use as a breathing gas.
helium

An inert gas which is used as a component of breathing gas mixtures for deep diving.
helium analyzer

An instrument used to identify the presence and concentration of helium in a mixture of gases
helium unscrambler
helium speech unscrambler

helmet diving

Henry's law

Description of the changes in solubility of a given gas in a given liquid as pressure varies.

Subsection: Top, Ha, He, Hi, Ho, Hu

== Hi ==
HID light
High intensity discharge light: Used in cave diving light heads (q.v.).
HIRA
Hazard Identification and Risk Analysis: A risk management procedure for identifying hazards and assessing the risk associated with them and ways to reduce the risk to an acceptable level.

Subsection: Top, Ha, He, Hi, Ho, Hu

== Ho ==
Hogarthian configuration
A scuba combination of backplate, wing, one-piece harness with crotch-strap, regulator arrangement including long-hose primary with a necklaced secondary demand valve, and, if used with twin cylinders, an isolation manifold. Named after William Hogarth Main, a developer and proponent of the system.
Hog looped
Hogarthian loop

A scuba configuration where the primary demand valve has a long hose which is routed under the right arm, usually tucked under a light battery canister on the waist belt of the harness, and around behind the neck to reach the mouth from the right hand side. Part of the Hogarthian configuration (q.v.).
Hoke valve

Valve on the US Navy MK V helium helmet. The gas supply at the diver was controlled by two valves. The "Hoke valve" controlled flow through the injector to the "aspirator" which circulated gas from the helmet through the scrubber, and the main control valve used for bailout to open circuit, flushing the helmet, and for extra gas when working hard or descending.
hold-back line
hold-back rigging
Rigging provided to restrain excessive buoyancy of a lifting bag when it is attached to the load and inflated.
homebrew
Amateur blended mixed gas.
hood
Close-fitting thermal head protection, usually neoprene foam, but also latex on some dry suits.
hook breathing

hooka
hookah

hopcalite

Catalyst sometimes used in breathing air compressor filters to oxidise carbon monoxide to carbon dioxide. Hopcalite is a mixture of manganese oxide, copper oxide and a small amount of silver oxide.
horse collar

hose dash size
Number indicating the bore of a hose in multiples of 1/16" preceded by a dash. for example a –04 hose, typically used for a pneumofathometer hose would have a nominal bore of 1/4 inch (6.4 mm).
hose organiser

Equipment to position and stabilise a hose, particularly in the context of sidemount or sling mounted scuba cylinders, where the regulator air hoses are stored against the cylinder when not in use.
hot mix
A breathing gas mixture with a high percentage of oxygen for the depth at which it is used. Using a gas mixture with a high partial pressure of oxygen.
hot stab connector
hot stab coupling

Quick connection coupling that can be connected by an ROV underwater, often to provide hydraulic power. The hot stab is the connector unit supplying the utilities, and it is usually inserted into a port after pulling out the plug stab, which is used to protect the port when it is not in use. Typically the alignment is not critical and the port will guide the stab in as it has concentric flow channels and o-ring seals. It may lock into place when fully inserted, or may require an external force to hold it in place while in use.
hot water suit

A loose fitting wetsuit supplied with heated water through a hose in the diver's umbilical, which links the diver to the surface support. The diver controls the flow rate of the water, allowing them to vary the warmth of the suit.
HP
High pressure, generally gas pressures in excess of 30 bar. In most of the world a high pressure diving cylinder is a 300 bar cylinder, but in the US it may refer to anything over 3000 psi working pressure. In a diving context gas working pressures do not frequently exceed 300 bar, but pressures in hydraulic systems and high pressure water jetting equipment may be considerably higher.
HPNS
high-pressure nervous syndrome

A neurological and physiological diving disorder that occurs when a diver descends below about 500 feet (150 m) while breathing a helium–oxygen mixture.
HRC
1. See: hyperbaric rescue capsule
2. See: hyperbaric rescue chamber
HRU

HSE

Subsection: Top, Ha, He, Hi, Ho, Hu

== Hu ==
HUD

H-valve

Cylinder valve body with two outlets and two valve mechanisms which can be independently controlled so that two regulator first stages can be fitted. Similar to Y-valve but in configuration where the second valve is parallel to the primary, though the secondary valve can sometimes be swivelled.
hydro
Slang/abbreviation for hydrostatic test (q.v.)
hydrophobic membrane
A membrane that is freely permeable to gas but does not allow the passage of water at low pressure differentials. Used in some rebreather scrubbers to keep water from the absorbent material
hydrostatic pressure

Pressure due to the weight of the water column above a point at depth.
hydrostatic test

Non-destructive test to revalidate pressure vessels which uses water as a test medium. The vessel is pressurised to the test pressure (q.v.) and measured for permanent set.
hydreliox

Deep diving breathing gas mixture of hydrogen, helium and oxygen.
hydrox

Deep diving breathing gas mixture of hydrogen and oxygen.
hyperbaric evacuation

Evacuation of divers under pressure from a saturation chamber to a hyperbaric rescue craft via a pressurised transfer system.
hyperbaric evacuation system

System for evacuating divers under pressure from a saturation system in an emergency. The whole system set up to provide hyperbaric evacuation, including planning, procedures, equipment used for evacuation, reception facility, contingency plans, possible safe havens and anything else requited for a successful hyperbaric evacuation.
hyperbaric lifeboat

A lifeboat with a hyperbaric chamber and life support system built into it for evacuating saturation divers in an emergency.
hyperbaric rescue capsule
A self contained buoyant hyperbaric chamber intended for emergency evacuation of saturation divers under pressure from a platform which has become so dangerous that it is considered safer to put the divers into the sea in the HRC to be picked up by a rescue vessel for transfer to another hyperbaric system for decompression.
hyperbaric rescue chamber
Normally a pressure vessel adapted to function as a means of hyperbaric evacuation with buoyancy chambers and lifting points, but not fitted in a lifeboat hull.
hyperbaric rescue facility
hyperbaric reception facility

A unit which allows for connection of hyperbaric lifeboats and hyperbaric rescue capsules. Usually modular and portable so they can be moved to a suitable venue for standby with the hyperbaric rescue vessel.
hyperbaric rescue unit
hyperbaric evacuation unit

Generic term for the unit provided to evacuate divers from a saturation system. It may be an HRC or a SPHL or some other suitable pressure vessel.
hyperbaric rescue vessel

A ship provided with equipment to handle the recovery of hyperbaric lifeboats and hyperbaric rescue capsules.
hypercapnia

Excessive level of carbon dioxide in the body, to a partial pressure of above 45 mmHg.
hyperfilter

Additional filter to produce air of oxygen compatible quality, usually for partial pressure gas blending. This may be built into the filling system or temporarily connected when required.
hyperoxic linearity

Property of an oxygen sensor to produce linear output at partial pressures above the highest calibration point.
hyperventilation
1. A deliberate deep breathing to reduce blood carbon dioxide level to extend the duration of a free dive.
2. Rapid breathing as the body's response to hypercapnia.
3. Rapid, often shallow breathing, associated with panic.
hyperventilation-induced blackout
See: underwater blackout syndrome
hypocapnia

Abnormally low tissue and blood carbon dioxide concentration.
hypothermia

A lowering of core body temperature, usually due to heat loss.
hypoxia

Abnormally low tissue oxygen concentration. Insufficient oxygen in the body to support normal activities or consciousness.
hypoxic training
prolonged underwater distance swimming or extended breath-hold intervals.

== I ==
Contents: Top	A	B	C	D	E	F	G	H	I	J	K	L	M	N	O	P	Q	R	S	T	U	V	W	X	Y	Z	References

IAOGP

ICD

IDRCF
IDRF
International Diving Regulators and Certifiers Forum, previously International Diving Regulators Forum. A voluntary group of diving regulators and certifying agencies formed to work together toward mutual recognition and to identify and implement best practices in diver training with the object of harmonizing cross border diver training standards outside Europe. Members include Australia, Canada, France, Norway, South Africa and United Kingdom.
IDSA
International Diving Schools Association: Formed with the primary purpose of developing common international diving standards for all occupational divers, Offshore, Inshore and Inland, and specialist related non-diving qualifications e.g. Supervisor, DMT and LST.
IMCA

International trade association for the marine contracting industry.
inert gas

A gas which is not metabolically active, used to dilute the breathing gas.
ingassing

Inert gas uptake in body tissues during a dive or other hyperbaric exposure.
inherent unsaturation

Metabolic reduction of total gas pressure in the tissues .
inshore
1. Legal: Within the territory of a country in which national legislation applies. (e.g. for occupational health and safety). Generally within the 12 nautical mile limit. (as opposed to "offshore")
2. Oceanographic: (also 'nearshore) the region of the shoreface, where waves are affected by the seabed.
inshore diver
Colloquial term for a diver who works on inland dive sites or coastal waters not associated with the oil and gas industry. Also referred to as "civils" as much of this work is connected with civil engineering works.
integrated open-circuit regulator

integrated weight system

Any system for carrying dive weights on the buoyancy compensator or diving safety harness, avoiding the use of a separate weight harness or weightbelt.
internal condition of cylinder
The state of the internal surface of a cylinder regarding corrosion, contamination and cracking.
International Association of Oil and Gas Producers

The international forum of the oil and gas producing industry.
interstitial emphysema
Gas trapped in the spaces between organs after lung barotrauma.
inverter line

in-water recompression

Recompression of a diver by returning to a specified depth in the water, followed by decompression on a specified gas, commonly oxygen, as treatment for decompression sickness or as prophylaxis for incomplete or missed decompression after a dive.
IP
Intermediate Pressure, or Interstage Pressure. The reduced pressure between the first and second stages of a diving regulator. Also referred to as LP (Low Pressure) in this context.
isobaric blackout

isobaric counterdiffusion

The diffusion of gases in opposite directions caused by a change in the composition of the external ambient gas or breathing gas without change in the ambient pressure.
isolation manifold

Connection between two scuba cylinders which when open allows free flow of gas in both directions between the cylinders, but has an isolation valve which can be used to block this flow.
isolation valve

Valve in an isolation manifold (q.v.) used to close the gas passage through the manifold and isolate the contents of the two cylinders. Used to prevent a leak on one cylinder from causing the other cylinder to also lose gas.

== J ==
Contents: Top	A	B	C	D	E	F	G	H	I	J	K	L	M	N	O	P	Q	R	S	T	U	V	W	X	Y	Z	References

Subsection: Top, Ja, Je, Ji, Jo, Ju

== Ja ==
jackstay

A line secured at both ends to serve as a support or guide.
jackstay search

Underwater search techniques using one or more jackstays to guide the searcher.
jack-up rig

A type of mobile platform that consists of a buoyant hull fitted with three or more movable legs, capable of raising its hull over the surface of sea. The buoyant hull enables transportation of the unit and all attached machinery to a desired location. Once on location the hull is raised to the required elevation above the sea surface on its legs supported by the sea bed.
J-cylinder
Bulk gas storage cylinder with internal volume of about 50 litres.

Subsection: Top, Ja, Je, Ji, Jo, Ju

== Je ==
Jersey upline

Subsection: Top, Ja, Je, Ji, Jo, Ju

== Ji ==
JIC fitting

A type of pipe and hose fitting with a 37-degree flare seating surface. Commonly used in umbilical hose connections.
JIM suit

An atmospheric diving suit manufactured by Underwater Marine Equipment Limited.

Subsection: Top, Ja, Je, Ji, Jo, Ju

== Jo ==
jocking strap
jocking harness
webbing strap system used with diving helmets to hold the helmet assembly down on the diver to prevent buoyancy lifting it when underwater.
Jonline

A short line used to connect to a shotline or anchor line, allowing the diver to move a short horizontal distance away to decompress. The line helps compensate for vertical movement in the anchor line or shot line due to waves.
job safety analysis
JSA

A procedure to integrate health and safety principles and practices into a particular task or job. Each basic step of the job is analysed to identify potential hazards and controls for each hazard.
J-search

A variation on the movable jackstay search suitable for a single diver.

Subsection: Top, Ja, Je, Ji, Jo, Ju

== Ju ==
jump

A path from a main guideline to another which is not in contact
jump camera
A camera mounted on a frame, which when lowered to the bottom of a body of water, takes a photograph, usually of the bottom under the camera. The frame constrains the camera to a fixed camera to subject distance, resulting in photographs of uniformly sized areas of bottom, equivalent to quadrats.
Jump jacket
A harness with integral buoyancy jacket specifically designed for commercial diving work with helmets and bells.
jump line

A short cave line, usually stored on a spool, used to connect between two permanent lines that are not in contact. May also be used to search for the other end of a break in a cave line and repair the break
jump reel
jump spool
A reel or spool with a relatively short line intended to be used as a jump line (q.v.).
J-valve

Scuba cylinder valve with lever operated reserve mechanism.

Subsection: Top, Ja, Je, Ji, Jo, Ju

== K ==
Contents: Top	A	B	C	D	E	F	G	H	I	J	K	L	M	N	O	P	Q	R	S	T	U	V	W	X	Y	Z	References

kayak diving

Diving from a special purpose kayak used to get to the site where the distance from a suitable entry and exit point is inconvenient for shore diving.
K-cylinder
Bulk high pressure gas storage cylinder size designation (approximately 50 litres internal volume)
Kelly
Kelly tube

K-valve

Scuba cylinder valve without reserve mechanism.

== L ==
Contents: Top	A	B	C	D	E	F	G	H	I	J	K	L	M	N	O	P	Q	R	S	T	U	V	W	X	Y	Z	References

Subsection: Top, La, Le, Li, Lo, Lu

== La ==
lanyard

A piece of cordage used to secure or lower things; usually it is used where there is a risk of losing the object.
LARS

laryngospasm

An uncontrolled or involuntary muscular contraction (spasm) of the laryngeal cords which causes a partial blocking of breathing in, while breathing out remains easier.
latent hypoxia
While freediving, an arterial oxygen partial pressure which is sufficient to sustain consciousness at depth, but when ascending drops to hyoxic levels due to the reduction of ambient pressure, associated with ascent blackout.
launch and recovery system

Mechanised system for lowering a diving bell, diving stage, hyperbaric evacuation unit, submersible or ROV from a vessel, offshore platform, dockside or other platform, and lifting it back on board.
lay barge

Barge on which pipeline sections are assembled, welded and laid on the seabed as the barge is moved forward.
lay line
laying line

To run line (unreel under light tension while advancing) and place it
lazy shot

A shot line (q.v.) which does not reach the bottom
LDS
Local dive shop. A retailer of recreational diving equipment, which may also sell cylinder fills, service equipment, provide training or book or organise recreational dives for customers.

Subsection: Top, La, Le, Li, Lo, Lu

== Le ==
LED

A semiconductor device for producing light from an electrical current commonly used in dive lights.
lens port
Transparent window on an underwater camera housing through which light reaches the lens.

Subsection: Top, La, Le, Li, Lo, Lu

== Li ==
LID

lifeline

A line connected securely to the diver at one end and anchored at the other end at the diving control point, which is handled by a line tender, and is used to communicate with the diver and provide a means of finding the diver for a surface standby diver, and for assisting the diver to the surface and back to the control point if necessary.
life support
life support system

Equipment vital to the short term survival of the diver. Most notably the breathing gas supply, and for saturation diving, equipment for providing a correctly pressurised environment. In some cases thermoregulatory equipment is also considered life support, and in saturation diving, all of the peripheral systems essential to maintaining a habitable saturation system.
life support package (LSP)

A collection of equipment and supplies kept in a suitable location such that when a hyperbaric rescue chamber or self-propelled hyperbaric lifeboat arrives at the safe haven it is available to support or complete decompression by using the LSP components to maintain the decompression environment by way of power, gas mixtures, heating and cooling.
life support supervisor
A senior life support technician (q.v.) appointed by the diving contractor to supervise the operation of saturation life-support systems.
life support technician

A person who operates and maintains the life support systems of a saturation diving system.
lift bag
lifting bag

A robust and air-tight bag with straps, which is used to lift heavy objects underwater by means of the bag's buoyancy when filled with air.
lift capacity
lifting capacity
Amount of buoyancy provided by an inflated BCD, DSMB, or lifting bag,
light
Alternative term for a viewport of a standard diving helmet.
light head

The part of a canister light (q.v.) which emits light, and is held in the hand or mounted on the helmet.
lightweight helmet

Low volume, close fitting diving helmet, usually with demand valve. Neutrally buoyant, and moves with the diver's head.
line marker

Line arrows, cookies and sometimes clothes pegs. Tags used to indicate the direction to an exit, midway point between exits, jumps and personal markers to identify divers on a guide line in an overhead environment.
line tender

line trap
Narrow gap where the guide line passes but divers can not get through.
lipid pneumonia

A lung inflammation (pneumonia) that develops when lipids enter the bronchial tree
liveaboard
live-aboard

A large boat which provides transport, accommodation and services for vacationing recreational divers.
live-boating
1. Diving from a boat which is under way (not moored). The major implication is that the engines will be running and propellers or thrusters may be engaged while divers are in the water, a significant hazard.
2. (offshore diving) Diving from a vessel underway, making way, but not using dynamic positioning. In offshore diving, diving from a DPV is not considered live-boating.
living depth

Subsection: Top, La, Le, Li, Lo, Lu

== Lo ==
lock

Compartment of a hyperbaric habitat or chamber which can be entered through two or more openings which can be closed and sealed, and the pressure adjusted relative to the adjacent chambers. Used to transfer personnel or equipment between areas of different pressure, and for transfer under pressure between hyperbaric chambers.
lock-in
Enter a pressurised environment through an airlock
lock-off
Disconnect a mobile hyperbaric chamber from another hyperbaric chamber after sealing the doors between them and venting the connection space.
lock-off time
The time at which a diving bell under pressure is locked off (disconnected) from the compression chamber(s) on deck.
lock-on
Connect a mobile hyperbaric chamber to another hyperbaric chamber so that the pressures can be equalised to allow transfer under pressure between them.
Lock-on time
The time at which a diving bell under pressure is locked on (reconnected) ready for equalisation to the compression chamber(s) on deck.
lock-out
Exit from a pressurised environment through an air-lock
lockout

Safety procedure when working on a hazardous energy source.
lockout mode
lock-out mode

Factory set function of some dive computers which disables the computer from decompression calculation after a violation of a factory set limit for depth, decompression ceiling or other violation of approved operating range for a period sufficient for tissues to fully desaturate if the diver survives uninjured (48 hours in some models). Some models will lockout immediately, usually to gauge mode which provides depth and time data but no decompression information, leaving the diver without some safety-critical information, others will continue to provide the diver with best estimate decompression information until the end of the dive.
log book
Record of dives kept as proof of experience. Optional for recreational divers, but legally required for professional divers in many jurisdictions.
long hose
long-hose

5 to 7 feet (1.5 to 2.1 m) interstage hose used on one of the regulators used by cave and other technical divers, which allows gas sharing through narrow spaces where the divers must pass through in single file.
longshore current

Mass transport of water along a shoreline, often due to wave action at an angle to the shoreline.
loop

The ambient pressure circuit in a rebreather through which the breathing gas passes during a breathing cycle.
loop flush
1. Manual addition of gas mixture to the breathing loop of a semi-closed circuit rebreather to ensure that the loop mixture has enough oxygen to support consciousness during an ascent. This is most necessary with passive addition rebreathers with a low discharge ratio, but can be relevant with active addition rebreathers, depending on the mass flow rate.
2. (Also loop purge, or diluent flush) Manual addition of diluent mix to the breathing loop of a closed circuit rebreather, to check calibration of oxygen sensors, or when there is uncertainty as to the current loop mix.
loop mix
loop mixture
1. The breathing gas in the loop of a rebreather.
2. Composition of the breathing gas in the loop of a rebreather, usually after passing through the scrubber, where it has had the carbon dioxide removed and is analysed for oxygen partial pressure.
loop volume
Volume of the breathing loop of a rebreather.
loop vent valve
An over-pressure relief valve in a rebreather loop.
lost buddy drill
lost buddy procedure

standardised procedure followed when a diver realises that their buddy is not where they should be. Procedures may vary depending on the circumstances and training organisations.
lost line drill
lost line procedure

Standardised procedure to be followed when the guideline to open water is lost in a penetration dive, often in conditions of low visibility and darkness.
low impact diving

Diving with low environmental impact. Diving in a way that avoids contact with or disturbance of sensitive organisms and adversely affecting the environment. Usually applied to recreational diving.
low pressure
1. Also: "intermediate pressure"
In diving, low pressure usually refers to the gas pressure provided from the first stage regulator to the demand valve for reduction to ambient pressure, the pressure provided by a low-pressure breathing air compressor to the gas panel for supply to the diver's umbilical or airline, or the pressure supplied to buoyancy compensator, dry suit or supply for lift bag inflation gas or pneumatic tools. These pressures are generally less than 30 bar, and in the case of scuba regulators are usually about 9 to 11 bar above ambient pressure.
2. In the context of diving cylinders, in the US, a low pressure cylinder has a working pressure below 2,500 pounds per square inch (170 bar)
low visibility
low viz

Water where, regardless of illumination, the distance over which objects can be seen is small. It is a term with highly variable and often relative meaning, but it would be almost universally accepted that less than 0.5 metres (1.6 ft) visibility would be considered low visibility. For operational purposes NOAA define it as "When visual contact with the dive buddy can no longer be maintained", and DAN Southern Africa suggest less than 3 metres (9.8 ft).
low volume mask
Half mask with a small interior volume, particularly suited to freediving, as less gas is needed to equalise during descent.
LP

LP compressor
Low-pressure compressor. Used for breathing air supply for surface supplied air diving.
LP cylinder
Low-pressure cylinder (US) with working pressure less than 2,500 pounds per square inch (170 bar).
LP port
Opening on the first stage of a regulator through which regulated gas is supplied at low/intermediate pressure.
LST

Subsection: Top, La, Le, Li, Lo, Lu

== Lu ==
lung packing
lung-packing

== M ==
Contents: Top	A	B	C	D	E	F	G	H	I	J	K	L	M	N	O	P	Q	R	S	T	U	V	W	X	Y	Z	References

Subsection: Top, Ma, Me, Mi, Mo, Mu

== Ma ==
mammalian diving reflex

A reflex response to breathhold and chilling of the face diving response expressed by the cardiovascular system, which exhibits hypertension, bradycardia, oxygen conservation, arrhythmias, and contraction of the spleen.
manifold

manifold (breathing gas supply)

Panel for the distribution of diver breathing gas.
manifold operator

A person such as a life support technician (LST), diving supervisor, or mixed-gas diver, who is designated to perform the duties of gas distribution on a surface-supplied mixed gas (HeO_{2}) diving operation, who is competent in the operation of the manifold and whose primary responsibility is to operate the manifold.
manual bypass valve
A valve that allows the diver to manually inject gas into the breathing loop of a rebreather, bypassing the valve operated by the control system.
manual closed circuit rebreather

A closed circuit rebreather which relies on the diver to monitor and control the gas mixture in the loop.
manufacturing standard

Set of design and manufacturing rules intended to produce uniform and safe products by several manufacturers in an industry.
Marsh Marine connector
One of the popular underwater plug connector systems for diver communications cables.
Martini's law
Rough rule of thumb for estimating nitrogen narcosis effects based on equivalence to consumption of dry martinis: Variously quoted as one martini per 10 m or one martini per 50 ft depth.
mask squeeze
Barotrauma of descent due to lower than ambient pressure in the diving half-mask, caused by inadequate equalising.
master link
(Rigging): The large heavy duty link to which the legs of a chain sling are attached, and which is the attachment point on the sling for the lifting hook or shackle
maze cave
Cave structure characterised by multiple branches and changes in direction.
mCCR
MCCR

Subsection: Top, Ma, Me, Mi, Mo, Mu

== Me ==
medical lock

Small lock on a decompression chamber used for transfer of medical equipment and other supplies into and out of the chamber while the chamber remains under pressure.
metres sea water

Unit of pressure equal to 1/10 bar. Not a linear measure of depth.

Subsection: Top, Ma, Me, Mi, Mo, Mu

== Mi ==
microbubbles
Microscopic bubbles which are not detectable by ultrasound or Doppler ultrasound, yet can affect the likelihood of DCS by slowing off-gassing.
micronuclei
Microscopic cavities that function as bubble seeds by absorbing dissolved gas.
mid-water
midwater
Significantly distant from both the bottom and the surface.
mix
Short for trimix breathing gas
mixed gas
Breathing gas for diving other than air, but usually implies a helium based mixture.
mixed mode diving
A mixed mode dive team is a buddy team where the divers use different modes of diving on the same dive, such as one diver on open circuit and the other on rebreather
mixed platform diving
Mixed platform rebreather diving refers to the use of different makes or models of rebreather on the same dive.

Subsection: Top, Ma, Me, Mi, Mo, Mu

== Mo ==
mobile diving system

A diving system (q.v.) which is installed on a vessel or installation on a temporary basis and that is not fixed, i.e. can be demobilised, transported and re-sited. Includes surface supplied air, nitrox, heliox and saturation diving systems.
mobile offshore drilling unit

A generic term for several classes of self-contained floatable or floating drilling rigs such as drilling vessels, semisubmersibles, submersibles, jack-ups, and similar facilities that can be moved without substantial effort. These facilities may have self-propulsion equipment on board and may require dynamic positioning equipment or mooring systems to maintain their position.
MOD
Maximum operating depth: Limiting depth for safety based on partial pressure of oxygen of a breathing gas mixture.
modified flutter kick
Version of the flutter kick finning style which reduces risk of silting by directing thrust more directly backwards. Two techniques exist: One version has the legs bent at the knees so that the fins are placed relatively high and on average are aligned more horizontally. The other version has one fin stationary below the moving fin to deflect downwash. Leg movement is restrained, and ankle movement used for precision manoeuvring.
modified frog kick
Version of the frog kick finning style which reduces risk of silting by directing thrust more directly backwards. Performed with bent knees and fins raised above the line of the torso.
MODU

monofin

A type of swimfin typically used in finswimming and free-diving. It consists of a single surface attached to footpockets for both of the diver's feet.
molecular sieve

Material containing tiny pores of a precise and uniform size that is used as an adsorbent for gases and liquids. Molecules small enough to pass through the pores are absorbed while larger molecules are not. It is different from a common filter in that it operates on a molecular level.
monkey diving

The use of sidemount configuration and procedures with a single cylinder.
moon pool
moonpool

An opening in the floor or base of the hull, platform, underwater habitat, or chamber, giving access to the water below.
msw

Subsection: Top, Ma, Me, Mi, Mo, Mu

== Mu ==
muck diving

Recreational diving in low visibility, generally because there are some organisms of interest which live in that habitat.
multi-level dive

A dive profile in which the diver remains in more than one distinct depth ranges (excluding decompression stops) for a significant period before beginning final ascent to the surface.
multiple stage compressor
multi-stage compressor

Compressor in which gases are compressed more than once, usually with cooling between stages. Used to improve efficiency and reduce temperatures.
mung
A brown organic deposit usually found on the ceilings of caves which is easily dislodged by diver's exhaust bubbles and then drifts down through the water.
mushroom valve
A rubber non-return valve flap which is circular or oval, with a stem in the middle to attach it to the holder in the centre of the grating over the orifice. Also sometimes known as umbrella valve.
M-value

At a given ambient pressure, the M-value is the maximum theoretical value of absolute inert gas pressure that a tissue compartment can take without presenting symptoms of decompression sickness.

== N ==
Contents: Top	A	B	C	D	E	F	G	H	I	J	K	L	M	N	O	P	Q	R	S	T	U	V	W	X	Y	Z	References

Subsection: Top, Na, Ne, Ni, No, Nu

== Na ==
NACD
National Association for Cave Diving
narcs

Navy Experimental Diving Unit

The United States Navy Experimental Diving Unit, the primary source of diving and hyperbaric operational guidance for the US Navy, located in Florida.
Navy SEAL

A US Navy trained combat diver.
NDL

Subsection: Top, Na, Ne, Ni, No, Nu

== Ne ==
neck dam

The lower part of a lightweight diving helmet which includes a neoprene or latex neck seal similar to the neck seal on a dry suit, to prevent ingress of water.
necklace
Bungee loop attached to the secondary regulator second stage, worn around the neck to store the secondary close under the chin, where it is protected and the diver is immediately aware of a free-flow. With a little adjustment and practice it is possible to pick it up by head and mouth movement alone, not needing use of a hand. The bungee is attached to the second stage by a breakaway connection, often a close-fitting loop over the mouthpiece, so that it can be moved away from the diver's head in an emergency without disturbing the primary second stage or the mask.
neck thread

Internal screw thread in the bore of the cylinder neck to fit a cylinder valve, which controls flow of gas into and out of the cylinder.
NEDU

negative buoyancy

Buoyancy less than weight. Insufficient upward force due to buoyancy to keep afloat or remain at constant depth
negative buoyancy entry
negatively buoyant entry
negative entry

Entry into the water in a buoyancy condition that will sink by default. When intentional, generally after reducing buoyancy of BC and, if applicable, dry suit by venting to ensure that the diver will not float back to the surface, but will continue to descend.
negative pressure breathing
negative static lung load

Breathing against an external pressure slightly less than the relaxed pressure in the lungs. More effort is needed to inhale, less to exhale. This can occur when using back mounted counterlungs on a rebreather, in a steep head up position with a single-hose demand valve, or when snorkelling.
neo-Haldanian

Decompression models based on later modifications of the principles described by John Scott Haldane.
neoprene

Synthetic elastomer used in the form of foamed sheets as the material for most wetsuits and some drysuits.
neutral buoyancy

Having a fully immersed buoyancy exactly equal to weight, so that the forces are balanced and the person or object statically remains at a constant depth. Effectively average density is equal to that of the surrounding fluid medium. The state of neutral buoyancy is typically metastable for a compressible system.
Newtsuit

An atmospheric diving suit designed and originally built by Phil Nuytten.
net cutter
A handle with a hooked blade used to cut netting or cordage to free the diver from entanglement
NFCI
Non-freezing cold injury: Permanent tissue damage due to low temperature exposure without any freezing damage.

Subsection: Top, Na, Ne, Ni, No, Nu

== Ni ==
niggles

Minor symptoms characteristic of mild decompression sickness.
night diving

Diving during the hours of darkness.
NiMH
Nickel-metal hydride. A technology for rechargeable battery cells.
nitrile

A synthetic elastomer used for most standard O-ring seals.
nitrogen

The major component gas of air and many breathing gas mixtures used in diving. Important in diving as an active agent in nitrogen narcosis and decompression sickness.
nitrogen narcosis

Also known as narcs, inert gas narcosis, raptures of the deep, Martini effect: A reversible alteration in consciousness that occurs while breathing gases containing nitrogen under elevated partial pressure similar to alcohol intoxication or nitrous oxide inhalation, and can occur during shallow dives, but usually does not become noticeable until greater depths, beyond 30 meters.
nitrox

Mixture of nitrogen and oxygen for use as breathing gas. Usually with oxygen percentage higher than air.
nitrox stick

A mixing tube used to blend oxygen with air before compressing to make nitrox breathing gas.

Subsection: Top, Na, Ne, Ni, No, Nu

== No ==
NOAA
National Oceanic and Atmospheric Administration (US)
no decompression limit

No decompression limit. The maximum time which a diver can remain at a specified depth without incurring a stage decompression obligation in terms of the specified decompression tables or algorithm.
nominal capacity
Volume of free gas contained by a scuba cylinder when filled to charging pressure at constant temperature.
No-mount diving

A specialized overhead-environment strategy for dealing with particularly tight restrictions which may involve divers wearing a very basic harness or simply hand-carrying cylinders.
normoxic
1. A breathing gas mixture with oxygen content approximating atmospheric air.
2. A breathing gas for diving which contains sufficient oxygen to minimise risk of hypoxia at atmospheric pressure.
NSS
National Speleological Society

Subsection: Top, Na, Ne, Ni, No, Nu

== Nu ==
nystagmus

An oscillation of the eyes alternating a slow eye movement in one direction, and a fast eye movement in the other direction.

== O ==
Contents: Top	A	B	C	D	E	F	G	H	I	J	K	L	M	N	O	P	Q	R	S	T	U	V	W	X	Y	Z	References

octopus breathing
Sharing air using an octopus regulator
octopus regulator

A secondary demand valve fitted to a diving first stage for use as an alternative air source for another diver in case of an emergency. Also occasionally useful as a backup in case of some kinds of malfunction of the primary
offboard
Not an integral part of the scuba unit. Usually applied to gas cylinders carried additional to the onboard gas of a rebreather.
offboard gas
Gas carried in cylinders not integrally mounted on a rebreather, but plumbed into the unit.
off-gassing

offshore
1. A significant distance away to seaward from the shoreline.
2. Outside the national maritime border, in international waters, though generally still inside the exclusive economic zone.
offshore diver

Colloquial term for a diver who works in the offshore oil and gas industry. A professional diver who works in regions outside the jurisdiction of national occupational health and safety and labour laws.
O-lay
Method for installation of sub-sea pipeline for the oil and gas industry. The pipe is constructed in an onshore construction yard, moved into the water and bent into a spiral without causing plastic deformation of the material. When the pipeline is sufficiently long it is transported with the help of tugs to the installation area. At the installation area the pipeline is unwound and pulled over a simple lay barge with stinger and installed on the bottom.
OLED

Organic light-emitting diode: A low energy high contrast light source commonly used on instrument displays such as later generation dive computers.
omitted decompression procedure
omitted decompression protocol

Procedure for managing a diver who surfaces without completing required decompression. If a chamber is available, the diver is recompressed in it, otherwise if no symptoms have presented, the diver may be recompressed as soon as practicable in the water. Various schedules for further decompression depend on the dive history.
on at the back, off at the hat

Commercial diving pre-dive check response by the diver confirming that the bailout cylinder valve is open at the cylinder (on at the back) and closed at the helmet bailout block (off at the hat).
onboard
Mounted directly onto the unit as an integral component. Usually applied to gas cylinders mounted on a rebreather frame or housing, or emergency gas supply cylinders mounted on a diving bell or stage.
onboard gas
Gas carried in cylinders mounted as part of a unit, usually a rebreather or diving bell or stage.
on-gassing

onshore

open circuit

Breathing apparatus which discharges exhaled gas into the environment, without any further use.
open water
1. See: List of diving environments by type#Environments by confinement. Water where there is no physical obstruction to a direct ascent to the surface.
2. Water which is open to influences by weather and climatic conditions.
optode
optrode

Optical sensor device to measure a specific substance, usually with the aid of a chemical transducer.
OOA
Out of air. An emergency situation where the supply of breathing gas to the diver has stopped.
OPV
Over-pressure valve. A pressure relief valve which automatically opens at a set pressure to allow excess gas to escape.
O-ring

A mechanical gasket in the shape of a torus; a loop of elastomer with a circular cross-section, designed to be seated in a groove and compressed during assembly between two or more parts, creating a seal at the contact surfaces.
oro-nasal mask
ori-nasal mask
A breathing mask that covers the mouth and nose only. It may be an independent item, such as an oxygen mask or BIBS mask, or it may be a component inside a full face diving mask or helmet to reduce the amount of dead space
OTU

outgassing

Diffusion of gas out of the tissue into the blood, and transport to the lungs where it diffuses into the lung gas and is eliminated by exhalation.
out-of-air accident
out-of-air incident
out-of-gas accident
out-of-gas incident

Underwater diving emergency in which the breathing gas supply to the diver is interrupted.
overhead
A physical or procedural obstruction to a direct ascent to the surface. Physical overheads include cave, cavern or culvert ceilings, fishing nets, ship hulls, and wreckage. Procedural overheads are generally a decompression obligation.
overrun
Excessive rotation of a reel or spool by inertia, causing the line to unwind beyond the amount paid out, and lie in loose coils on the spool which can jam or tangle.
overweighting

Carrying more ballast weight than is necessary to achieve neutral buoyancy at all times during a dive. In scuba diving usually a dangerous error, but used in surface-supplied diving to stabilise the diver when working on the bottom.
oxygen

Important component gas of atmospheric air and essential component of any breathing gas. Required to sustain life.
oxygen analyser
oxygen analyzer

Instrument for measuring the partial pressure of oxygen in a gas mixture
oxygen cell
Electro-galvanic oxygen sensor for measuring partial pressure of oxygen in the breathing gas using an oxygen analyser
oxygen clean

Cleaned for oxygen service by appropriate methods and materials and tested for contaminants. Verified that particulates, fibres, oils, greases and other contaminants are absent.
oxygen clock

A notional alarm clock, which accumulates hyperbaric oxygen exposure at a rate which increases with higher oxygen partial pressure toward the maximum single exposure limit recommended. This function is implemented as cumulative oxygen exposure for acute (CNS) oxygen toxicity in some dive computers.
oxygen compatible

Made from materials which are suitable for oxygen service. Capable of coexisting with elevated oxygen concentrations and a potential source of ignition without flashing, based on a system’s maximum operating pressure and temperature.
oxygen compatible air
Air which has been filtered to reduce contaminants to a level suitable for blending with high pressure oxygen. Air with a reduced level of condensable hydrocarbon mist or vapour.
oxygen design
oxygen service design

Design that minimizes any tendency for heat generation, ignition of particulates, or the accumulation of contaminants for an intended partial pressure of oxygen and temperature.
oxygen fraction

Fraction by volume or pressure of the gas mixture made up by oxygen
Oxygen Pete
Imaginary monster associated with CNS oxygen toxicity, also a CNS oxygen toxicity seizure.
oxygen rebreather

A closed circuit rebreather that uses only oxygen as a gas supply.
oxygen sensor
A component that produces a signal in response to the presence or concentration of oxygen. In diving this is usually a galvanic cell that generates a current and voltage proportional to the partial pressure of oxygen in a breathing gas.
oxygen service

Suitable for operating with significantly higher levels of oxygen than normal atmospheric air. Often implies special cleaning procedures, use of oxygen compatible materials, and design to reduce ignition risk. System or component that has been designed and tested for oxygen use, has been tested as oxygen clean and is oxygen compatible.
oxygen toxicity

A condition resulting from the harmful effects of breathing molecular oxygen (O_{2}) at elevated partial pressures.
oxygen toxicity unit
Unit of exposure to toxic concentrations of oxygen in breathing gas, primarily in connection with pulmonary oxygen toxicity and oxidative damage to cell membranes. The accumulation of OTUs depends on time and partial pressure of exposure, and dissipation is a function of recovery time at non-toxic partial pressures.
oxygen window

Inherent unsaturation due to metabolic reduction of total gas pressure in the tissues.
