= Glossary of underwater diving terminology: T–Z =

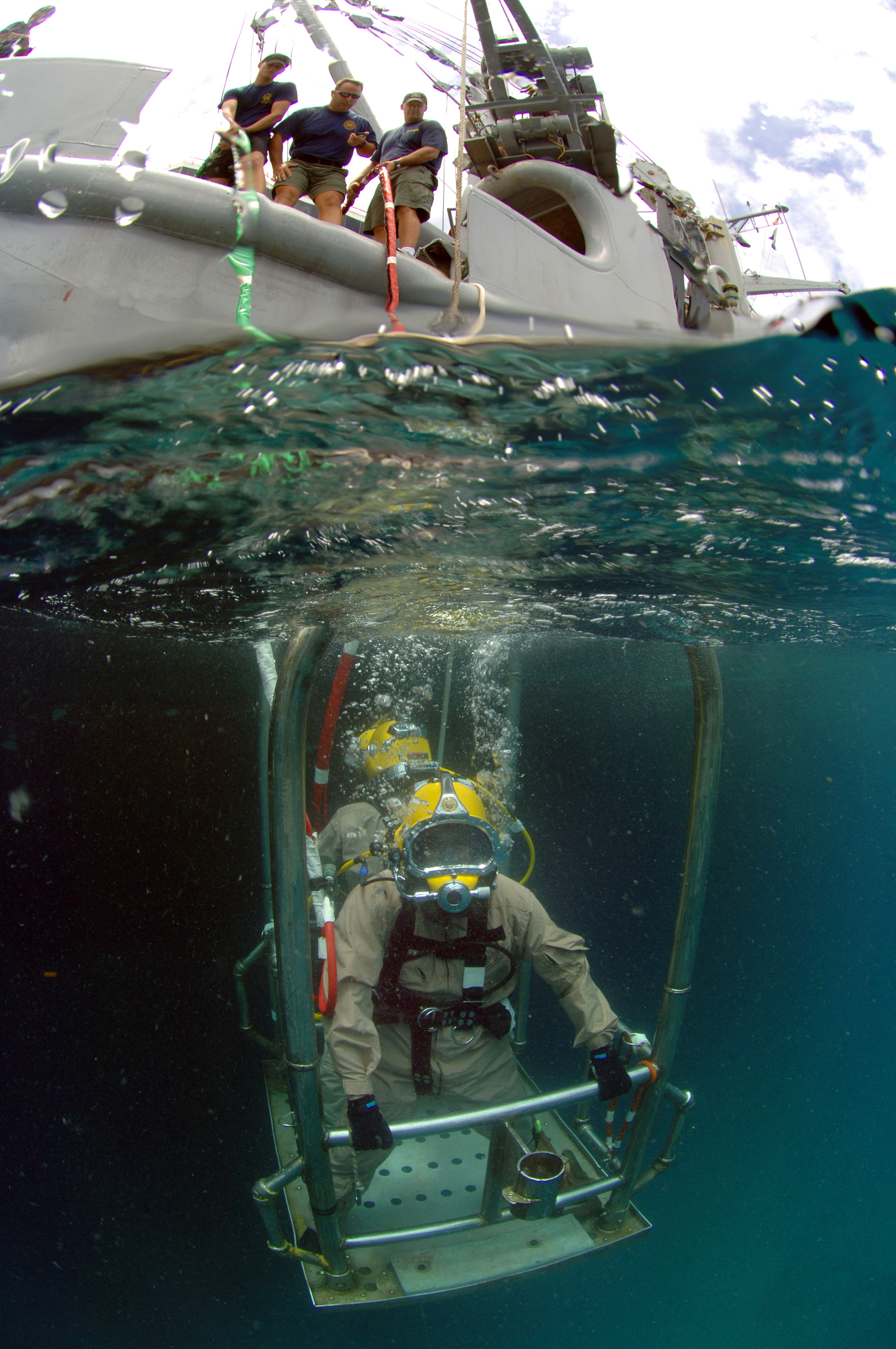
Surface-supplied divers riding a stage to the underwater workplace

This is a glossary of technical terms, jargon, diver slang and acronyms used in underwater diving. The definitions listed are in the context of underwater diving. There may be other meanings in other contexts.

The appeal of underwater diving as a human activity is usually associated with the view into an underwater environment that is typically inaccessible in daily life on land. Practitioners submerge below the surface of the water for a range of purposes, such as recreation, underwater photography, exploration of marine biology and nautical archaeology, search for shipwrecks, and other types of research.

Underwater divers may use no equipment at all, or a wide range of equipment which may include breathing apparatus, environmental protective clothing, aids to vision, communication, propulsion, maneuverability, buoyancy and safety equipment, and tools for the task at hand.

Many of the terms are in general use by English speaking divers from many parts of the world, both amateur and professional, and using any of the modes of diving. Others are more specialised, variable by location, mode, or professional environment. There are instances where a term may have more than one meaning depending on context, and others where several terms refer to the same concept, or there are variations in spelling. A few are loan-words from other languages.

There are five sub-glossaries, listed here. The tables of content should link between them automatically:

- Glossary of underwater diving terminology: A–C
- Glossary of underwater diving terminology: D–G
- Glossary of underwater diving terminology: H–O
- Glossary of underwater diving terminology: P–S
- Glossary of underwater diving terminology: T–Z

== T ==
Contents: Top	A	B	C	D	E	F	G	H	I	J	K	L	M	N	O	P	Q	R	S	T	U	V	W	X	Y	Z	References

Subsection: Top, Ta, Te, Ti, To, Tu

== Ta ==
tank factor

taravana

A form of decompression sickness originally observed among Polynesian island natives who habitually did multiple repetitive deep breath-hold dives.
task loading

A multiplicity of responsibilities leading to an increased risk of failure on the part of the diver to undertake some key basic function which would normally be routine for safety.
taut wire system

A constant tension wire from a vessel to a weight on the seabed used as a reference to detect movement of a dynamically positioned vessel from the reference point.

Subsection: Top, Ta, Te, Ti, To, Tu

== Te ==
team redundancy

System for sharing backup equipment and skill diversity.
technical diving

An extension of the scope of recreational scuba diving to applications with greater technical complexity and higher inherent risk. Definitions vary, but diving with multiple breathing gases, helium based gases, closed circuit rebreathers, or under extensive overheads are generally considered as technical diving. There is no sharp distinction from other forms of recreational diving.
tech ring
D-ring welded to a belt slide so that it can not fold down against the webbing. Intended to make it easier to fit and remove snaps.
temperature stick
tempstick

An array of temperature sensors mounted in a rebreather scrubber canister along the path of gas flow to monitor the temperature as an indication of the advance of the exothermic reaction front of the scrubber, providing an indication of scrubber depletion.
tension leg platform
tension leg rig

A vertically moored floating structure normally used for the offshore production of oil or gas, particularly suited for water depths between 300 and 1500 meters. The platform is permanently moored by means of near vertical tethers at each of the structure's corners and virtually all vertical motion of the platform is eliminated.
test of pressure

Diagnostic procedure for decompression sickness. The diver is recompressed, and if the symptoms reduce, it may be assumed that the diver has decompression sickness and hyperbaric treatment will be effective. The test is not entirely reliable
test pressure

Pressure at which a pressure vessel such as a gas storage cylinder or hyperbaric chamber will be hydrostatically tested for revalidation. Usually 1.5 or 1.67 x working pressure for gas storage cylinders.
tethered ascent

Ascent controlled by a line from the diver to a fixed point at the bottom. This may be used to control depth and rate of ascent when the diver has inadvertently lost complete control of buoyancy due to loss of ballast weight, so cannot attain neutral buoyancy at some point during the ascent, and needs to do decompression. CMAS require this skill for their Self-Rescue Diver certification.
tethered diving
Diving with a lifeline between the diver and a surface tender.
tether management system

The TMS is either a garage-like structure which contains and supports the ROV during lowering through the splash zone or, on larger work-class ROVs, a separate assembly mounted on top of the ROV. The purpose of the TMS is to lengthen and shorten the tether so the effect of cable drag where there are underwater currents is minimized.
Thalmann algorithm

The Exponential/linear decompression algorithm used in the 2008 US Navy decompression tables.
therapeutic recompression

A procedure for treating decompression sickness by recompressing the diver, thus reducing bubble size, and allowing the gas bubbles to re-dissolve, then decompressing slowly enough to avoid further formation or growth of bubbles, or eliminating the inert gases by breathing oxygen under pressure
therapeutic schedule
Procedure for hyperbaric treatment involving recompression to relieve symptoms, followed by decompression at a rate unlikely to cause a relapse. Use of special breathing gas, particularly oxygen, to increase the rate of elimination of inert gases is common.
thermal profile monitor

thermocline

A thin but distinct layer in a large body of fluid, in which temperature changes more rapidly with depth than it does in the layers above or below.
thermodynamic decompression model

Hypothesis that bubble formation during decompression will not occur provided absolute ambient pressure exceeds the total of the partial gas tensions in the tissue for each gas.
thirds

three part shackle

A shackle which uses a bolt as the pin, secured with a nut. The nut may be locked with a split pin for greater security. The bolt may rotate in the shackle under load without great risk of unscrewing the pin
through-water communications

Wireless voice communications transmitted through the water
thumb the dive
Terminate the dive by signalling exit to surface at a time or place other than the planned turning point.
thunderflash
Friction initiated noisy but relatively harmless pyrotechnic device designed for military exercises, with civilian use for diver recall.

Subsection: Top, Ta, Te, Ti, To, Tu

== Ti ==
time to fly
The surface interval necessary after diving to reduce tissue gas concentrations to a level where the risk of decompression sickness due to the pressure reduction experienced in normal commercial airliners is acceptable.
tinnitus

The perception of sound within the ear in the absence of corresponding external sound. Usually a constant tone.
tissue compartments

Hypothetical body tissues which are designated as fast and slow to describe the rate of saturation.
tissue half times

The time it takes for the tissue to take up or release 50% of the difference in dissolved gas capacity at a changed partial pressure.
TNT
1. Total Nitrogen Time: Residual nitrogen time plus actual dive time. Equivalent time of hyperbaric exposure for a repetitive dive used with some decompression tables.
2. Trinitrotoluene, a high explosive

Subsection: Top, Ta, Te, Ti, To, Tu

== To ==
toolbox talk

A meeting held at the start of each shift or prior to any project critical operation, where the diving supervisor or the diving supervisor’s delegate and shift personnel discuss the forthcoming tasks or jobs and the potential risks and necessary precautions to be taken.
top up

To reconnect a partially filled cylinder and add gas until the pressure is within tolerance of the required charging pressure when corrected for temperature.
touch contact signals

Toynbee manoeuvre

Method of equalising the middle ears by pinching the nose and swallowing.
trait anxiety

A tendency to respond with anxiety in the anticipation of threatening situations.
transect

A path along which one counts and records occurrences of the phenomena of study.
transfill

Fill cylinder with gas by transfer from a cylinder with higher pressure.
transfill whip
High pressure hose and end fittings used to decant between cylinders. Usually includes purge valve and may include pressure gauge.
trauma shears

Blunt tipped slightly serrated shears with angled blades sometimes used by divers as a safety cutting implement in place of a knife or line cutter.
travel gas
Gas mixture used for descent and ascent when the bottom gas is not suitable for breathing at shallower depths.
traverse
Pass through a cave by entering at one point and exiting at another.
treatment table
A depth, time and breathing gas profile designed to treat a diver for decompression illness.
tremie

A pipe, through which concrete is placed below water level. The top of the tremie is above water and open, and the bottom end is kept below the surface of the poured concrete.
triangular profile
A triangular dive profile is one in which, after a descent at constant rate, and a short bottom time at maximum depth, the diver maintains a constant, slow ascent to the surface or first decompression stop. A plot of depth against elapsed time takes a triangular shape.
triglide

trilam
trilaminate
Material used for dry suit shells made of a layer of waterproof rubber laminated between two layers of woven textile.
trimix

Mixture of three gases for breathing. Oxygen, nitrogen and helium are the gases used. The gas fractions will usually be specified.
trim weight

Ballast weight placed to improve a diver's trim.
tripping line
A line attached to the top of an open parachute lifting bag and at the other end to an anchor point. Its purpose is to invert and thus empty the bag if it becomes detached from the load.
try-dive
try dive
tryout dive
1. Guided dive using unfamiliar equipment as a marketing technique, in the hope of convincing the diver that the product is worth buying. Some instruction or guidance on the use and characteristics of the product is usual. Similar in concept to test driving a motor vehicle, and similarly, generally offered to qualified operators, except for rebreathers, where one qualifies on a specific type.
2. Also called "Discover Scuba Diving by PADI." A single dive experience under the direct supervision of a recreational instructor offered to uncertified novices in the hope of them deciding to purchase entry level training. Some instruction on the essential skills and risks is generally provided, and the dive is generally conducted in benign conditions. Compare with resort diving.

Subsection: Top, Ta, Te, Ti, To, Tu

== Tu ==
tube

A seamless transportable compressed gas container, with a water capacity exceeding 150 litres (5.3 cu ft) but not more than 3,000 litres (110 cu ft); Often mounted horizontally in manifolded groups on a trailer or intermodal container frame.
TUP
Transfer under pressure Transfer of personnel between hyperbaric environments, usually between a closed bell and a saturation system, or between a portable recompression chamber and a multi-occupant chamber
turbidity

The cloudiness or haziness of a fluid caused by individual particles (suspended solids) that may be invisible to the naked eye, similar to smoke in air
turn the dive
Start the return on a dive which has reached the planned turning point in terms of depth, time, gas supply or distance.
twilight zone
Deeper than 60 m in the sea, or the part of a cave or cavern that has dim but discernible ambient light.
type 1 wet bell

Wet diving bell (q.v.) with no direct supply of gas and services to the bell. Diver umbilicals lead directly to the surface control point.
type 2 wet bell

Wet diving bell (q.v.) with umbilical supply of gas and other services to the bell, from which they are distributed to the divers umbilicals from a control panel in the bell.

== U ==
Contents: Top	A	B	C	D	E	F	G	H	I	J	K	L	M	N	O	P	Q	R	S	T	U	V	W	X	Y	Z	References

UBA
Underwater breathing apparatus: Equipment used to supply breathing gas to an underwater diver. Usually refers to the part of the system carried underwater by the diver.
UDT vest
Underwater Demolition Team vest, An inflatable surface life-jacket worn by underwater demolition teams. Similar in style and a precursor to the horse-collar style buoyancy compensator.
UHMS
Undersea and Hyperbaric Medical Society
umbilical
umbilical cable

Life support hose and cable bundle connection to a surface supplied diver or diving bell. Comprises gas supply hoses, pneumofathometer, a strength member and communications cable, and may also include gas reclaim hose, hot water hose and hoses for hydraulic or pneumatic power, and electrical and optical cables for ancillary equipment. Underwater television cameras and cabling can also be carried as a component part of the umbilical or can be taped or banded to it on a temporary basis. Also refers to the power, control and instrument cable for a ROV.
umbilical changeout

Emergency procedure to disconnect the umbilical and connect a replacement in situ during the dive. Usually only used when a delay in recovering the diver or bell is likely.
umbilical cutter

Mechanism fitted to a closed bell which allows the occupants to sever the bell umbilical from inside the sealed and pressurised bell in the event of an umbilical snag that prevents bell recovery. The device is typically hydraulically operated using a hand pump inside the bell, and can shear the umbilical at or just above the point where it is fastened to the top of the bell.
undertow

A subsurface flow of water returning seaward from shore as result of wave action.
underwater blackout syndrome

Loss of consciousness due to hypoxia during a breath-hold submersion preceded by hyperventilation where alternative causes of blackout have been excluded.
unscrambler

upline

A fairly substantial natural fibre rope which is deployed from the bottom using a small lift bag to provide the equivalent of a shotline. The lower end is tied off to the bottom, usually on a wreck, and the diver ascends on the line to avoid being swept away from the site by currents. After reaching the surface, the last diver cuts the line and it sinks back down, Natural fibre is used so the line rots away over a few years.
upstream
Against the flow.
upstream valve

Valve, (usually regulator first stage or demand valve), where the valve mechanism moves against the flow when opening, and the pressure difference over the valve tends to close it.
uptake
(also gas uptake) See ingassing
upwelling

An oceanographic phenomenon that involves wind-driven motion of dense, cooler, and usually nutrient-rich water towards the ocean surface, replacing the warmer, usually nutrient-depleted surface water.

== V ==
Contents: Top	A	B	C	D	E	F	G	H	I	J	K	L	M	N	O	P	Q	R	S	T	U	V	W	X	Y	Z	References

Subsection: Top, Va, Ve, Vi, Vo, Vu

== Va ==
Valsalva maneuver

Technique for equalising the middle ear by moderately forceful attempted exhalation against a closed mouth and blocked nose
valve cage

Structure or frame fitted to scuba cylinder to protect the cylinder valve or manifold and regulator first stage from impact damage and roll-off .
valve drill
Safety exercise in which the diver shuts down, tests regulators and re-opens the manifold valves on a twin set in a specific order.
valve guard
protective structure or frame fitted to the top of a bulk storage cylinder to protect the cylinder valve from mechanical damage.
van
Enclosed portable compartment with diving spread support equipment. Often built into an intermodal container. Exanples:
- DDC van, containing control panels for deck decompression chamber operation,
- Machinery van, containing hydraulic power pack, compressor, air banks or similar equipment
Van der Waals equation

Thermodynamic equation of state for a real (non-ideal) gas.
vasoconstriction

The narrowing of blood vessels resulting from contraction of the muscular wall of the vessels, particularly the large arteries and small arterioles.
vasodilation

The widening of blood vessels resulting from relaxation of smooth muscle cells within the vessel walls, particularly in the large veins, large arteries, and smaller arterioles.

Subsection: Top, Va, Ve, Vi, Vo, Vu

== Ve ==
venous gas embolism

Inert gas bubbles formed in the venous circulation.
venting breath
Breathing pattern intended to vent gas from a rebreather loop, usually by exhaling through the nose.
venting tube
Rubber tube closed with a stopper and normally attached to the chest area of an otherwise valveless dry suit, enabling the latter to be completely deflated before entering the water or inflated in the water to make the suit buoyant if required.
vertical entry
vertical drop entry

An entry technique for relatively high drops, up to and sometimes exceeding 3 m. The feet are overlapped and the legs kept straight. The body and head are kept vertical and the mask and DV held against the face with one or both hands, elbows tucked in. The intention is to hit the water vertically, with the least likelihood of knocking off or damaging vital equipment.
vertigo

A type of dizziness, where there is a feeling of motion when one is stationary.
VGE

Subsection: Top, Va, Ve, Vi, Vo, Vu

== Vi ==
viewport
1. Glass or plastic window on a diving helmet or mask.
2. Window on a hyperbaric chamber or manned submersible .
VIP
Visual Inspection Programme (US). Annual visual internal inspection of a scuba cylinder.
visibility
viz

The distance through the water at which an object can just be seen against the background. Often defined as the distance at which a Secchi disc perpendicular to the sight line can first be seen when moving towards it. It can vary depending on direction illumination, and depth.
visual gap
Gap between guidelines which is small enough that each line can be seen from the other.
visual jump
The procedure of crossing a visual gap (q.v.) without the use of a jump line.
visual inspection
Internal and external inspection of a pressure vessel as part of revalidation procedure
Visual Plus

Eddy current crack detection test procedure for parallel neck threads of aluminium cylinders.
Viton

Synthetic fluorocarbon based elastomer suitable for oxygen service O-rings.
volume tank
A pressure vessel connected to the outlet of a gas supply and used as a gas reservoir.
voting algorithm
voting logic

The logical procedure in which rebreather electronics compare output from multiple sensors when sensors produce significantly different values, suggesting that one or more are faulty, and choose which signals should be ignored, assuming statistical independence of the sensors, which may not be valid.
VPM

(also Variable permeability model). A decompression model and associated algorithms based on bubble dynamics.
VVAL18

Exponential-Linear algorithm used for the 2008 US Navy tables, which assumes exponential ingassing and a combination of linear and exponential outgassing rates.

Subsection: Top, Va, Ve, Vi, Vo, Vu

== W ==
Contents: Top	A	B	C	D	E	F	G	H	I	J	K	L	M	N	O	P	Q	R	S	T	U	V	W	X	Y	Z	References

== Wa ==
wah-wah
the wah-wahs
A noise inside the diver's head associated wth nitrogen narcosis in very deep air dives.
wall diving

Recreational scuba diving along the face of a near vertical cliff wall, particularly if the bottom is below the range of the diver's equipment and certification. This requires good buoyancy control.
washout
See outgassing
water capacity

Of a cylinder: The internal volume. The amount of water it would hold at ambient pressure at 20 °C (68 °F)
water trap
Mechanism to trap liquid water carried by compressed gas.

== We ==
weight belt

Ballasted waist belt worn by divers to compensate for excess buoyancy. For scuba and freediving, usually easily removed to establish positive buoyancy in an emergency.
weight harness

Webbing strap system to support diving weights, usually suspended from the shoulders and fastened around the waist. The harness may carry the weights directly, or they may be carried in pockets on the harness. For scuba diving the weights may be arranged for easy shedding.
weighting system

Weights, generally made of lead, to counteract the buoyancy of other diving equipment, and the belts, pockets or harnesses used to support them.
weight slider
weight stop

welding shield
Cover for the viewport area of a helmet or mask to filter excessive light and UV when welding or oxy-arc cutting.
wellhead

The assembly at the surface of an oil or gas well that provides the structural and pressure-containing interface for the drilling and production equipment.
wet bell

A mobile platform used to deploy and recover divers to and from working depth fitted with an air dome and on board emergency gas supply for use as safe haven in emergencies. There may be a main supply umbilical from the surface providing breathing gas to a manifold inside the wet bell and diver excursion umbilicals terminated at the wet bell, or the divers' umbilicals may be direct from the surface.
wet filling

Filling scuba cylinders using a water bath for cooling the cylinders.
wet notes
wet-notes
A small notebook of waterproof paper carried by some divers
wet pot
Any static hyperbaric chamber which has wet internal surfaces in normal use.
1. Water filled hyperbaric chamber, generally for experimental work or training. See Diving chamber#Wet pot
2. Transfer chamber in a saturation system, where the bell is locked on and wet equipment removed after the dive.
3. Shower and toilet chamber in a saturation system.
wet snorkel

A snorkel with an open top permitting water to enter the barrel when the user has submerged.
wetsuit

A close fitting, thermally-insulating, foam neoprene diving suit that allows a limited volume and movement of water inside the suit.
whip
Flexible high pressure gas hose with connector at the free end, used for temporary connections. The other end may be permanently connected to an installation or other equipment, or may also have a temporary connector. Whips are commonly named for their intended use, e.g. filling whip, for filling cylinders, decanting, transfill or transfer whip for decanting between cylinders, oxygen whip for oxygen transfer, blending whip, for decanting gases when blending gas, etc. Accessories may include a flow control valve, bleed valve, pressure gauge, and/or whip check.
whip check
whiplash arrestor
A cable or webbing strap connecting a hose end to the attachment point in addition to the hose end fitting, which restrains the movement of the hose if the connection is broken under pressure. Whip checks connecting two hose ends may also be attached to an anchor point to limit motion further if this is practicable.
whip sock

Whip check device which contains a short section of the whip within a braided tube which reduces wear and point loading on the hose, and constrains motion of the hose end more than a standard whip check in case of disconnection under pressure.
wing

Back inflation buoyancy compensator cell.
WKPP
Woodville Karst Plain Project, a project to survey subterranean aquifers in Florida.

== Wo ==
woolly bear
A wool or synthetic pile thermal under-suit worn under a diving dry suit, particularly with standard diving dress, often one-piece.
working pressure

Maximum filling pressure rating for the cylinder at standard temperature.
work of breathing

The effort expended in inhaling and exhaling the breathing gas.
wreck diving

Recreational or technical diving on and inside of shipwrecks.
wrist slate
A small plastic writing surface attached to the diver's wrist

== X ==
Contents: Top	A	B	C	D	E	F	G	H	I	J	K	L	M	N	O	P	Q	R	S	T	U	V	W	X	Y	Z	References

== Y ==
Contents: Top	A	B	C	D	E	F	G	H	I	J	K	L	M	N	O	P	Q	R	S	T	U	V	W	X	Y	Z	References

yoke adaptor

A fitting used to connect a regulator or filling whip with a DIN thread connection to a CGA 850 "international" connection cylinder valve.
yoke fitting

A fitting used to connect a regulator or filling whip to a diving cylinder using the CGA 850 "international" connection.
yoke valve

A valve used to connect a regulator or filling whip to a diving cylinder using the CGA 850 "international" connection, mostly used in the US and countries where US diving tourists are economically important.
Y-valve

Cylinder valve body with two outlets and two valve mechanisms which can be independently controlled so that two regulator first stages can be fitted. Similar to H-valve but in Y configuration.

== Z ==
Contents: Top	A	B	C	D	E	F	G	H	I	J	K	L	M	N	O	P	Q	R	S	T	U	V	W	X	Y	Z	References

ZHL-8
ZHL-16
Bühlmann decompression algorithms. Also ZHL-16a, b and c
zip tie

Self-locking plastic strip used to connect objects together.
Z-knife
Line cutting tool with a replaceable blade in a slot.
