= Glossary of underwater diving terminology: D–G =

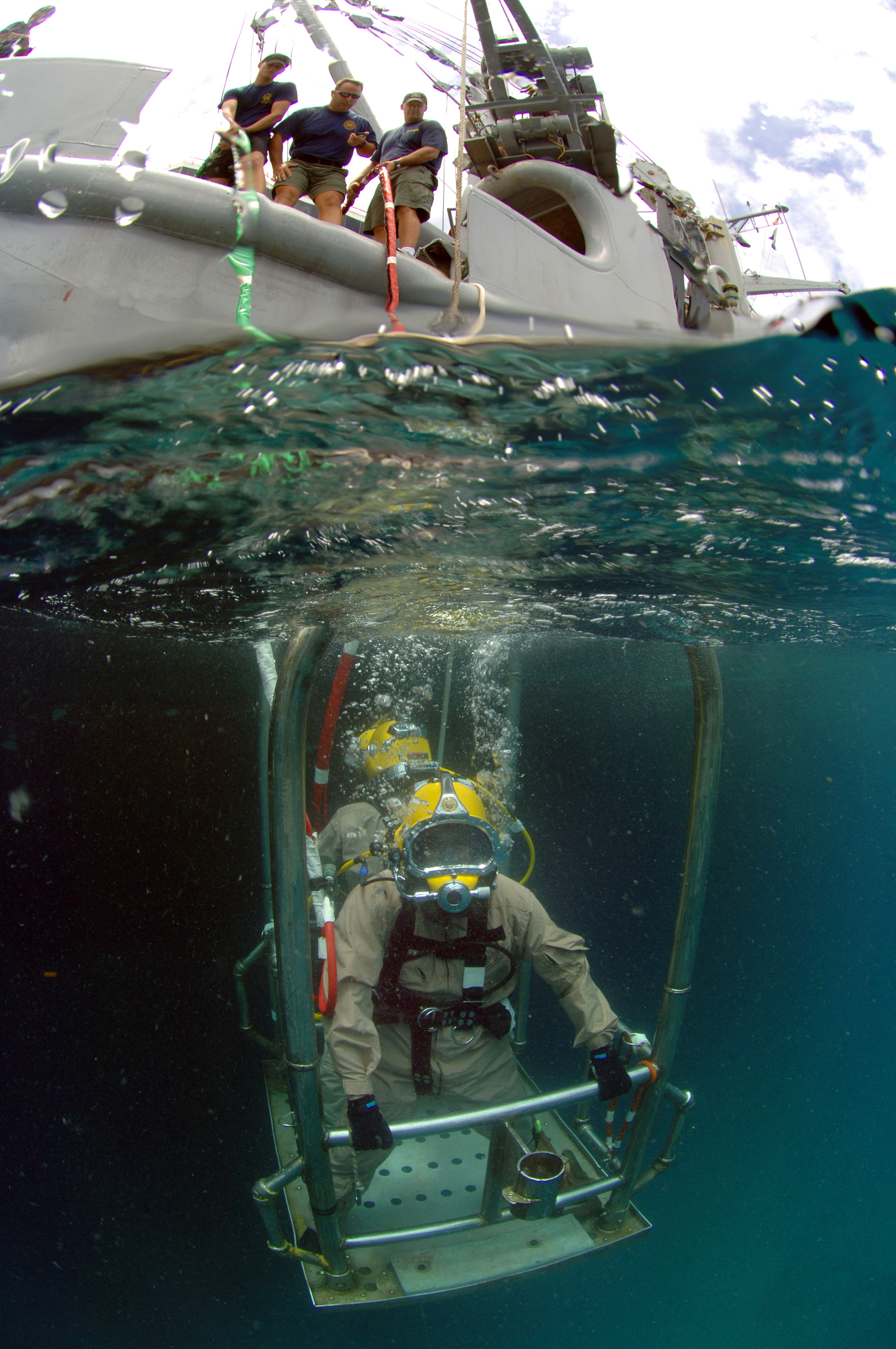
Surface-supplied divers riding a stage to the underwater workplace

This is a glossary of technical terms, jargon, diver slang and acronyms used in underwater diving. The definitions listed are in the context of underwater diving. There may be other meanings in other contexts.

The appeal of underwater diving as a human activity is usually associated with the view into an underwater environment that is typically inaccessible in daily life on land. Practitioners submerge below the surface of the water for a range of purposes, such as recreation, underwater photography, exploration of marine biology and nautical archaeology, search for shipwrecks, and other types of research.

Underwater divers may use no equipment at all, or a wide range of equipment which may include breathing apparatus, environmental protective clothing, aids to vision, communication, propulsion, maneuverability, buoyancy and safety equipment, and tools for the task at hand.

Many of the terms are in general use by English speaking divers from many parts of the world, both amateur and professional, and using any of the modes of diving. Others are more specialised, variable by location, mode, or professional environment. There are instances where a term may have more than one meaning depending on context, and others where several terms refer to the same concept, or there are variations in spelling. A few are loan-words from other languages.

There are five sub-glossaries, listed here. The tables of content should link between them automatically:

- Glossary of underwater diving terminology: A–C
- Glossary of underwater diving terminology: D–G
- Glossary of underwater diving terminology: H–O
- Glossary of underwater diving terminology: P–S
- Glossary of underwater diving terminology: T–Z

== D ==
| Contents: Top | A | B | C | D | E | F | G | H | I | J | K | L | M | N | O | P | Q | R | S | T | U | V | W | X | Y | Z | References |

Subsection: Top, Da, De, Di, Do, Du

== Da ==
Dalton's law

Gas law describing the relation of component pressures of gases in a mixture to the total pressure.
DAN

dangly
(Derogatory) Any part of a diver's equipment that dangles in a position that might impact the bottom or get caught on the surroundings.
DCAP
Decompression Computation and Analysis Program: Decompression planning software by Bill Hamilton.
dcCCR
DCCCR

Diver-controlled closed-circuit rebreather. A closed circuit rebreather which requires the diver to monitor oxygen levels and manually inject oxygen or diluent as needed to maintain an appropriate partial pressure in the loop.
DCIEM

Defence and Civil Institute of Environmental Medicine (Toronto, Canada).
DCIEM tables

Decompression tables based on the Kidd-Stubbs model, developed and published by the Defence and Civil Institute of Environmental Medicine.
DCI

DCS

DDC

Subsection: Top, Da, De, Di, Do, Du

== De ==
dead man anchor
deadman anchor
deadweight anchor

A heavy weight used to control the rise of a lifting bag after breakout, or to capsize it to prevent a runaway lift. Sometimes just called a deadweight. More generally, an anchor that relies on its weight to provide resistance to drag or lift loads. Deadman anchor more generally refers to a buried log, and may be misused in this context, but it is a common term in commercial diving.
dead space
dead volume

1. The volume of a breathing apparatus which holds exhaled air, which is subsequently inhaled directly. without passing through a scrubber to remove carbon dioxide and without oxygen addition. there can be dead space in both open and closed circuit breathing apparatus
2. The volume of inhaled air, which does not take part in gas exchange either because it remains in the conducting airways or in alveoli that are poorly perfused.
decant

To transfer gas between cylinders by differential pressure. No energy is input, flow will stop when valve is closed on reaching target pressure, or pressures are equalised.
deck decompression chamber

A twin-lock hyperbaric chamber suitable for surface decompression and emergency recompression. Large enough to hold at least two occupants, one of them lying down.
decompression

Reduction in ambient pressure experienced by the diver during the ascent at the end of a dive or hyperbaric exposure, and the process of allowing dissolved inert gases to be eliminated from the body tissues during this reduction in pressure.
decompression algorithm

Specified step-by step procedures used to calculate the decompression stops needed for a given dive profile. The algorithm can be used to generate decompression schedules for a particular dive profile, decompression tables for more general use, or be implemented in dive computer software to perform real-time analysis of decompression status of the diver.
decompression bar

decompression buoy

decompression ceiling

Shallowest depth to which a diver with decompression obligation can ascend with acceptable risk of developing symptomatic decompression sickness.
decompression chamber

Hyperbaric chamber used for decompressing divers and emergency therapeutic recompression.
decompression computer

decompression gas

Gas breathed during decompression, or gas intended for breathing during decompression. The term commonly implies a composition chosen to accelerate decompression by using an increased oxygen content.
decompression illness

Illness caused by decompression. Includes decompression sickness and arterial gas embolism due to lung overexpansion injury.
decompression model

A conceptual explanation for the physiological effects of decompression and an associated mathematical approximation, usually expressed as an algorithm or formula, which describes and predicts those physiological effects. Some are more reliable than others. None are a true description of the physiological processes, but they may be sufficiently reliable to be useful.
decompression obligation

Calculated theoretical requirement to make decompression stops during ascent based on the dive profile, breathing gases, and the decompression model in use.
decompression schedule

A specific ascent rate and series of increasingly shallower decompression stops that a diver uses to allow inert gases to be eliminated from the body tissues during ascent after a specific hyperbaric exposure, to reduce the risk of decompression sickness.
decompression sickness

A condition arising from dissolved inert gases coming out of solution during decompression as bubbles in the tissues, organs and blood vessels of the body causing symptoms ranging from rashes to death.
decompression status
Theoretical tissue inert gas loading after a given dive history according to the chosen decompression model. It is a measure of whether, and how much, decompression is recommended by the algorithm.
decompression stop

A pause during the ascent phase of a dive that a diver spends at a constant relatively shallow depth to allow safe release of inert gases from the body tissues to avoid decompression sickness.
decompression stress

An indicator of risk for decompression sickness associated with the excess (supersaturation) of inert gas dissolved in the various tissues throughout the body, driving bubble formation and growth. Decompression stress can occur without symptomatic decompression sickness, but decompression sickness is a consequence of a high decompression stress.
decompression tables

Printed cards or booklets that allow divers to determine a decompression schedule for a particular dive profile and breathing gas.
Deep Air Diving

Diving past what is considered the safe diving limits for compressed air. This typically ranges from 50m – 60m depending on agency The deepest air limit for a recognised course offered by an established agency is 73m. This is only available through the PSAI Narcosis Management, Level 7 Course.
decompression trapeze

A horizontal bar or bars suspended at the depth of intended decompression stops by buoys, used to make decompression stops more comfortable and more secure and provide the divers' surface cover with a visual reference for the divers' position.
deep-sea diving
deep sea diving
1. A term originally referring to diving with standard diving dress, where the helmet is sealed to the watertight diving suit, as contrasted with a shallow-water diving helmet, which is open at the bottom and was used for work in shallow water where the diver could ditch the helmet and make a free ascent in an emergency. Several incompatible definitions or usages have been published, including diving in the deeper parts of the ocean, but the only technology that can withstand those pressures is specialised submersibles.
1. Diving in special submersibles capable of withstanding the pressures of deeper parts of the ocean. The first dive of Otis Barton and William Beebe in their Bathysphere on 11 June 1930, to below 1400ft off Bermuda has been cited as the first deep-sea dive.
deep stops

Decompression stops which are deeper than the deepest stops required by decompression algorithms using dissolved phase models.
deep water blackout
1. Freediving: An ambiguous alternative term for blackout of ascent following a deep breath-hold dive, in which loss of consciousness occurs as the surface is approached, or at the surface, caused by cerebral hypoxia arising from the rapid drop in the partial pressure of oxygen in the lungs during ascent as the ambient pressure drops and the gas in the lungs expands to surface volume.
2. Scuba and surface-supplied diving: Loss of consciousness in deep air diving at depths below 50 m with no clear primary cause, associated with nitrogen narcosis, a neurological impairment with anaesthetic effects caused by high partial pressure of nitrogen dissolved in nerve tissue, and possibly acute oxygen toxicity. The term is not in widespread use at present.
dehydration

A condition where the water content of the body is reduced.
delta P
ΔP
δp
Environments where a pressure difference causes flow. Usually refers to cases where the flow is likely to entrain and pull the diver into an enclosed space or through an opening.
demand helmet

Diving helmet which provides breathing gas supply flow only when the diver inhales, triggered by the pressure drop.
demand valve

Mechanism for providing the user with breathing gas flow only when required. The valve may be triggered by a reduction of pressure across the actuator diaphragm to below ambient due to inhalation, or by pressing a manual override (Purge button).
demobilisation
demobilization
{{defn|1=Stage of a contract in which the contractor's equipment on site is dismantled, packed up, transported back to the storage area and prepared for storage. Compare with mobilisation.
depth gauge

A pressure gauge calibrated to measure depth as a function of ambient pressure.
descending line

A substantial heavily weighted line attached to a secure point at the surface, such as a boat or buoy, which can be used by a diver to control position and depth during descent an ascent.
developed pressure

The pressure of the compressed gas in a cylinder at a temperature other than the nominal temperature at which charging pressure is specified. Usually refers to pressure when fully charged at a variation from the reference temperature.
DGPS

An enhancement to Global Positioning System that provides improved location accuracy. DGPS uses a network of fixed, ground-based reference stations to broadcast the difference between the positions indicated by the satellite systems and the known fixed positions.

Subsection: Top, Da, De, Di, Do, Du

== Di ==
Diamond Reef System

A diving skills program that uses a set of standardized portable obstacles to train and evaluate buoyancy skills and educate scuba divers on how to interact with coral reefs.
differential pressure hazard
delta P hazard

Situation where water flows from a region of higher pressure to one of lower pressure, and where obstructing the flow will induce a large force on the obstruction. A type of diving hazard.
diffusion limited

Decompression hypothesis that the uptake and elimination of inert gas is limited by diffusion rates in the tissues. Compare with perfusion limited.
diluent

Gas mixture used to dilute the oxygen in the loop of a closed circuit rebreather to a partial pressure suited to the depth.
diluent flush

Replacing the gas within the breathing loop of a rebreather by injecting diluent gas while venting the previous gas mix. Usually done to get a breathable mixture of known composition in the loop to check calibration of the oxygen cells.
DIN fitting

Usually refers to G5/8" x 14 tpi parallel thread fittings used to connect a cylinder valve to a filling connection or regulator first stage. Available in 200 bar and 300 bar versions which should only be inter-connectable in safe combinations. 232 bar DIN (5-thread, G5/8) Outlet/Connector #13 to DIN 477 part 1, and 300 bar DIN (7-thread, G5/8) Outlet/Connector #56 to DIN 477 part 5 – these are similar to 5-thread DIN fitting but are rated to 300 bar working pressures. The 300 bar pressures are common in European diving and in US cave diving.
DIN plug
Screw in plug to seal the outlet of a DIN valve.
DIN plug adaptor

Screw in adapter which can be used with many recent 200/240 bar DIN cylinder valves to allow connection of Yoke regulators or filling whips.
dip tube

A short tube screwed into the hole in the bottom of the cylinder valve body, which projects into the cylinder internal space. Its function is to prevent any loose debris inside the cylinder from getting into the outlet passages if the cylinder is inverted in use.
DIR

direct ascent
Uninterrupted approximately vertical ascent to the water's surface without decompression stops, usually also without a safety stop
display integrated vibratory alarm

Display integrated vibrating alarm – A head-up display module which produces a warning vibration to draw the attention of the diver, generally mounted on the diver's mask or the rebreather mouthpiece.
distance line

A line used by scuba divers as a means of returning to a safe starting point in conditions of low visibility, water currents or where pilotage is difficult. They are often used in cave diving and wreck diving where the diver must return to open water after a penetration when it may be difficult to discern the return route. Guide lines are also useful in the event of silt out.
ditch

Disconnect and drop, unceremoniously or hastily abandon.
ditchable weight
Ballast weight that is carried in a way that it can be released to fall free of the diver to increase buoyancy in an emergency. The classic example is a weightbelt with a quick-release buckle.
DIVA

dive
(legal) A human activity in which a person enters water or any other liquid, or a chamber in which they are subject to a pressure greater than 100 millibars above atmospheric pressure and, while in such an environment, they breathe air or other gas at a pressure greater than atmospheric pressure.
dive computer

A device used by a scuba diver to measure the time and depth of a dive so that a safe ascent profile can be calculated and displayed so that the diver can avoid decompression sickness.
dive factor

Factor used in gas consumption estimates which allows for increased breathing rate due to conditions other than depth. Values range from 1.1 for relaxed, stress free conditions to more than 3.0 for heavy work.
dive flag
Flag used to indicate that there are divers in the water. There are two versions: the international code letter flag 'Alpha',, and the red flag with white diagonal bar,.
dive ladder
diver ladder

A ladder suitable for divers dressed for the specific dive to climb up and down between the surface deployment area and the water.
Dive Leader
EN 14153-3 / ISO 24801-3 standard competence for recreational scuba diver. A level 3 "Dive Leader" has sufficient knowledge, skill and experience to plan, organise and conduct their dives and lead other recreational scuba divers in open water, to conduct any specialised recreational scuba diving activities for which they have received appropriate training, plan and execute emergency procedures appropriate for the diving environment and activities. If diving and environmental conditions are significantly different from those previously experienced, they require an appropriate orientation with regard to local environmental conditions, and must have appropriate specialised training and experience to lead on dives which have more demanding operational parameters.
dive location
(Professional) The vessel, structure, or base from which occupational dives are conducted and supported. More specifically, the point from which the actual dive is controlled.
dive marshall
Recreational and club diving equivalent of a diving supervisor. The person who organizes and plans a group dive outing for recreational divers, assesses risk, logs divers into and out of the water and is available at the site to manage incident response.
divemaster

A professional level recreational diver who leads a group of less experienced or visiting divers underwater.
dive platform
1. Recreational: Fixed or movable platform on a dive boat which divers use to more easily enter and leave the water.
2. Commercial: Structure on which the diving spread is established. Usually a vessel or an offshore or waterside structure.
dive profile

The variation of depth with elapsed time during a dive, often depicted as a graph.
dive site

The place at which the dive occurs. Also, more broadly, a place at which diving occurs, has occurred, or is planned to occur, and the general locality, with extent depending on context. Professional divers may also refer to a work site, or search area if relevant.
dive skins
A lycra suit worn by a diver in warm water or under a wet suit.
dive spread
diving spread
The on-site topside infrastructure for commercial diving, particularly the diving support equipment. The spread may be assembled from modular components, often mounted in intermodal container frames for easy transport, assembly, and secure fixing down on site.
dive station
The site from which a professional diving operation is directly controlled.
dive tables

dive time
The total elapsed time spent underwater during a dive.
dive timer

An automatically operated electronic timer which records the elapsed time from the start of a dive.
diver deployment system
Equipment and procedures to get professional divers into the water, to the underwater work site, and back.
diver excursion
Movement of a diver away from a reference point, such as the diving bell or stage, the workplace, or the working depth. For example, an excursion by a saturation diver from a closed bell to the underwater workplace may involve an excursion upwards or downwards to a different ambient pressure, or a combat swimmer with an operating depth of 6m may make a short term excursion to a maximum depth of 15m on an oxygen rebreather.
diver lift

A mechanism used to lower one or more divers into the water to a shallow depth, and to lift them out again.
diver training manual

A publication containing instructional material for diver training. This may relate to a specific certification or a range of certifications, and is usually published either by a certification agency or a diving school for their own use, but may also be published and sold for general consumption.
diver transfer chamber
Hyperbaric chamber connecting other component chambers of a saturation life support system which may be at different pressures.
diver umbilical
diver's umbilical

Bundle of life-support hoses, communication cable, pneumofathomer hose and strength member between the surface control point and a surface-supplied diver.
Divers Alert Network

A non-profit organization for assisting divers in medical and travel emergencies, advising divers on medical matters, and medical research on recreational diving safety.
diver's attendant

A person who assists the working diver to prepare for a dive, get in and out of the water, and to undress from the diving equipment, and who tends the lifeline or umbilical while the diver is in the water.
diver's slate

Piece of opaque white or pale coloured rigid plastic sheet with matte finish that is easily marked with a graphite pencil, used for taking notes, making sketches and written communication underwater.
dive/surface valve

Valve on the mouthpiece of a rebreather which can be switched between the loop and ambient air at the surface. It seals the breathing loop on the surface setting to prevent flooding the loop and is used for this purpose if the mouthpiece is removed from the mouth in the water. Compare with bailout valve (BOV).
diving
Underwater activity and related recompression facility operations where personnel are subjected to elevated ambient pressure.
diving basket
A diver deployment device similar to a diving stage, normally designed with an open cage.
diving bell

A rigid chamber suspended from a cable and used to transport divers to depth and back to the surface.
diving chamber
1. A simple form of submersible vessel to take divers underwater and to provide a temporary base and retrieval system in the depths (diving bell).
2. A land or ship-based hyperbaric chamber to artificially reproduce the hyperbaric conditions under the sea.
diving contractor
Legal persona responsible for commercial diving operations.
diving depth
Generally the maximum depth to which the diver is exposed during a dive.
diving heavy

Practice of carrying significantly more ballast weight than necessary to neutralise buoyancy. Common in professional diving operations where the diver needs to remain in firm contact with the bottom to work effectively, and is tethered by a lifeline or umbilical to a control point at a place of safety, which is managed by a tender.
diving manual
1. See: operations manual
2. See: diver training manual
Diving Medical Advisory Council

An independent body of diving medical specialists from Northern Europe which provides advice about medical and certain safety aspects of commercial diving.
diving medical technician

A paramedic specialising in diving related conditions, and medically fit to dive in a hyperbaric chamber.
diving method
diving mode

The combination of diving equipment, breathing medium and compression/decompression used for a diving operation, e.g. breathhold, open circuit scuba, nitrox rebreather, surface-supplied air, heliox saturation, etc.
diving operation

A portion of a diving project that can be safely supervised by one person, which can be a single dive or a number of dives.
diving procedure
Sequence of actions used to achieve a specific outcome during a diving operation. Often standardised, and based on experience of the procedure being safe and efficient. May be specified, recommended, or authorised by a training manual, operations manual or code of practice, and may have to be adapted to suit circumstances, while remaining essentially similar. See Standard operating procedure.
diving project
The overall diving job by a diving contractor under a specific contract or plan, regardless of duration.
diving regulator

diving response
diving reflex

The involuntary physiological response to immersion which exists in all air-breathing vertebrates. It is a series of autonomic responses to apnea which are strengthened by facial cooling and hypoxia. It consists of peripheral vasoconstriction and associated hypertension, vagally induced bradycardia and reduction of cardiac output. This appears to preferentially supply oxygen to the brain. Another aspect is splenic contraction which increases haemoglobin content of the blood.
diving safety officer

The person who administers a United States university's research diving safety program.
diving signals

Hand sign and light sign system used by scuba divers to communicate when underwater.
diving stage

A platform on which a diver stands which is hoisted into the water, lowered to the workplace at the bottom, and then hoisted up again to return the diver to the surface and lift them out of the water. The diving stage is particularly effective for controlling rate of descent and ascent.
diving superintendent
Person with overall responsibility for commercial diving operations at a large installation.
diving supervisor

Person in charge of, and responsible for safety of a commercial diving operation. Usually trained, assessed as competent, certified and registered. Formally appointed by the diving contractor.
diving support vessel

A ship or boat used as a base for diving operations, particularly if designed or fitted out for that purpose.
diving system
The complete set of equipment necessary to support a diving operation. The equipment and facilities required to execute the planned diving activity, including compression, decompression, rescue and recovery.
DMAC

DMT

Subsection: Top, Da, De, Di, Do, Du

== Do ==
Doing It Right

A holistic philosophy of scuba diving, which encompasses several essential elements, including fundamental diving skills, teamwork, physical fitness, strictly defined standard procedures, and the use of standardised, streamlined and minimalistic equipment configurations.
dome port
A domed window of optical quality glass or plastic which covers the front of an underwater camera or video housing.
donating the octopus

donating the primary
Rescue technique where the donor of breathing gas provides it via the primary second stage – the one from which the donor was breathing – as it is known to be working and providing the correct gas. The donor then switches to their backup DV, often stowed under the chin by a bungee necklace with a breakaway connection.
donating the secondary
Rescue technique where the donor of breathing gas provides it via the secondary, or octopus, second stage, and continues to breathe off the primary.
donkey dick
Slang term for the corrugated buoyancy compensator inflation and deflation hose.
Doppler bubble detection

Ultrasonic signals reflected from bubble surfaces to identify and quantify gas bubbles present in venous blood.
Dorf arrow

Triangular plastic line marker with two slots which is mounted on a cave guide line to indicate the direction of the exit.
downline
down line
A rope leading from the surface down to the underwater workplace which allows a commercial diver to travel directly to and from the job site and to control rate of descent and ascent in the same way as using a shotline. Also sometimes called a jackstay. A downline used for open ocean diving is much the same as a shotline (q.v.), but does not reach all the way to the bottom. An open-ocean downline is weighted at the bottom, and attached to a substantial float at the surface, which may be tethered to the boat. It may be marked at intervals by knots or loops, and may be attached to decompression trapeze system. In some cases a sea anchor may be used to limit wind drift, particularly if attached to a boat with significant windage.
downstream
In the direction of flow. Displaced from the reference point in the direction of flow
downstream valve

Valve in which the closure is downstream of the orifice. Pressure in the line tends to assist in opening the valve. When spring-loaded a downstream valve may open automatically if the pressure difference is excessive, thus functioning as a pressure relief valve
down time
Period when planned activities can not be done due to unforeseen or uncontrollable circumstances.
DP alert
Status of the dynamic positioning system regarding positional accuracy and reliability. Green indicates normal operation, yellow indicates degraded operation and red indicates emergency.
DP footprint
Dynamic positioning footprint: The area around the nominal position to which a dynamically positioned vessel is constrained by the DP system.
DPV
1. See: diver propulsion vehicle
2. See: dynamically positioned vessel
D-ring
A ring shaped like a capital D, usually of stainless steel or plastic, stitched or buckled to a diver's harness and used as an attachment point for lifeline, cylinders or other equipment.
Dräger tube
Draeger tube
Indicator tube used for testing breathing gas quality.
drift diving

Any dive where the diver is transported significantly by drifting with currents during the dive.
drillship
Ship built or converted for offshore well drilling, using dynamic positioning to maintain position in deep water.
drop cylinder

drop weight
Weight used during descent and ascent, but left on the bottom at the guideline during the deep part of the dive when it is not needed due to suit compression.
drowning

The process of experiencing respiratory impairment from submersion/immersion in liquid.
dry bag

Bag which seals in a watertight manner. Used for keeping clothes and other equipment dry in a wet environment.
dry bell

dry filling

Filling scuba cylinders without the use of a water bath for cooling.
dry snorkel

A snorkel topped with a shut-off valve designed to prevent water ingress when the user has submerged.
dry suit

A watertight suit worn to keep the diver dry and to provide protection from the environment. Thermal insulation may be provided by the suit or garments worn under the suit.
dry suit blowup

Uncontrolled ascent due to over-inflation of a dry suit.
DSV
1. See: dive/surface valve
2. See: diving support vessel
DSMB

An inflatable marker buoy deployed from underwater to indicate the position of a diver and to control ascent rate. Can also be used to mark a position or signal an emergency.

Subsection: Top, Da, De, Di, Do, Du

== Du ==
duckbill valve

A non-return valve manufactured from rubber or synthetic elastomer and shaped somewhat like the beak of a duck. Also known as a spear valve or flutter valve, this automatic device serves as a gas exhaust valve on the inside of some twin-hose diving regulators and as an excess gas release valve on the outside of certain mid-twentieth-century dry suits.
dump line
A rope attached to the dump valve on a lift bag which is used by a diver to operate the dump valve to release air for control and adjustment of the bag buoyancy.
dump valve
Valve used to release excess gas from a dry suit, buoyancy compensator, rebreather, or lift bag. Usually manually operated in buoyancy compensators and lift bags, and automatic in dry suits and rebreathers. May also function as an overpressure valve.
dwell time

Time that the breathing gas passing through a filter stack or absorbent canister remains in contact with the active filtration medium where the absorption of impurities can occur.
dynamically positioned vessel

Vessel which maintains position and heading using thrusters and positional feedback
dynamic positioning

Method of keeping a floating platform in position without anchoring, using thrusters and positional feedback.
dynamic setpoint

A target value for oxygen partial pressure in a rebreather loop which varies as a function of depth. Generally a setpoint that changes to optimize gas use, no stop time and other dive variables.
dysbarism

Medical conditions resulting from changes in ambient pressure.

== E ==
| Contents: Top | A | B | C | D | E | F | G | H | I | J | K | L | M | N | O | P | Q | R | S | T | U | V | W | X | Y | Z | References |

EAD

EAN

ear beer
A home made mixture of alcohol and acetic acid in water used as a drying agent and disinfectant to rinse the ears after diving, to prevent ear infections.
ear clearing

Equalising the pressure in the middle and external ear by opening the Eustachian tubes. Several techniques are used.
ECCR
ECCCR

Electronic closed circuit rebreather. Sometimes ECCCR for electronically controlled closed circuit rebreather, which is the same thing.
eddy current test

Method of non-destructive testing using electromagnetic induction to detect flaws in conductive materials. It is used to detect cracks in parallel neck threads of aluminium cylinders. Also called Visual Plus inspection. Required for cylinders of AA6351 alloy.
EDTC
European Diving Technology Committee
EGS

E-L algorithm

electro-galvanic oxygen sensor

An Electro-chemical fuel cell which produces a voltage proportional to the partial pressure of oxygen.
emergency gas supply

Breathing gas supply to a diver that is intended for use in a failure of primary, and where applicable, secondary, breathing gas supply systems. More than one emergency gas supply may be available, of which at least one is usually carried by the diver (scuba).
emergency position indicating radio beacon
emergency position indicating radiobeacon

Tracking transmitters which aid in the detection and location of boats and people in distress at sea.
emergency swimming ascent

Emergency procedure where the diver makes an ascent at approximately neutral buoyancy from depth after a breathing gas supply failure.
encapsulation
Using a diving suit which completely isolates the diver from direct contact with the environment.
END

Enriched Air Nitrox

EPIRB

equalise
Balance pressure of a gas filled space with the ambient pressure, by adding or venting gas, to prevent barotrauma or pressure damage.
equivalent air depth

Depth at which partial pressure of nitrogen in a nitrox mixture at a given depth is equal to the partial pressure of nitrogen in air. Used for approximating the decompression requirements of nitrox mixtures by finding the depth at which air would require the same decompression. Based on exposure to equal partial pressures of nitrogen at maximum depth.
equivalent narcotic depth
equivalent nitrogen depth

A way of expressing the narcotic effect of a breathing gas mixture at depth by comparison with the depth at which air would have a similar effect. Used to choose nitrogen content of a Trimix breathing gas for a planned dive profile to limit nitrogen narcosis. Based on limiting the partial pressure of nitrogen during the dive by diluting the breathing gas with helium.
eSCR
Electronic semi-closed circuit rebreather, where an electronic control system monitors the partial pressure of oxygen and adds gas to maintain a floating setpoint to optimise gas use and compensate for variations in diver exertion.
European Diving Technology Committee

International committee of European representatives promoting good standards for diving and co-ordinating, where possible, differing standards with the aim of making European professional diving safer.
exceptional exposure
A dive in which the risk of decompression sickness, oxygen toxicity, and/or exposure to the elements is substantially greater than on a normal working dive.
excursion

In Saturation diving an excursion is a lockout dive in which the diver is exposed to a depth pressure significantly more or less than the saturation storage depth, usually within limits that allow excursion and return to the storage depth without decompression being required before, during, or after the excursion. It can also mean a significant stepwise reduction of pressure at the start of decompression from saturation to a depth pressure which will maximise the utility of the oxygen window of the breathing gas, to reduce the total duration of decompression. This is not allowed by some decompression schedules.
excursion dive
Saturation diving where the divers work at a depth deeper or shallower than the saturation depth, after which they are returned to the original saturation pressure.
excursion tables
Tables for use in saturation diving that specify the limit upward and downward of excursions from the nominal depth, and provide a zone in which the diver can move freely without regard to the number of excursions or their duration without incurring a decompression penalty.
excursion umbilical

The combined supply and return hoses and cables for life-line, life-support, heating, power and communications between a diving bell and the diver
exhaust valve
A valve controlling the venting of gas from any higher pressure source such as a diving chamber, diver’s helmet, dry suit, buoyancy system, volume tank, lift bag etc. For some of these applications, also known as a dump valve.
extraction ratio

Ratio between minute ventilation and oxygen uptake, the volume rate of gas breathed to the amount of oxygen taken up in the bloodstream. A typical surface extraction ratio of 20 would mean that for every 20 litres of gas breathed, 1 litre of oxygen would be absorbed in the lungs.

== F ==
| Contents: Top | A | B | C | D | E | F | G | H | I | J | K | L | M | N | O | P | Q | R | S | T | U | V | W | X | Y | Z | References |

Subsection: Top, Fa, Fe, Fi, Fo, Fu

== Fa ==
faceplate
Viewport of a single-lens half mask, full-face mask or helmet. The transparent window through which the diver can see the surroundings.
failure modes and effects analysis

A methodology used to identify potential failure modes, determine their effects and identify actions to mitigate the potential failures.
failure modes, effects, and criticality analysis

An extension to FMEA of a criticality analysis, which combines the probability of failure modes with the severity of their consequences to identify relative risk of each mode, allowing remedial effort to be directed where it is likely to produce the greatest effect.
farmer john
Wet suit that covers the torso and legs only; it resembles a bib overall or salopettes.
fatigue cracking

Cracking in a material resulting from multiple stress cycles below the ultimate or yield strength. Usually refers to large number of cycles.

Subsection: Top, Fa, Fe, Fi, Fo, Fu

== Fe ==
feather breathing

Technique for emergency breathing from a free-flowing demand valve or leaking first stage where the diver manually controls air flow by opening and closing the cylinder valve.
feet sea water

Unit of pressure equal to 1/33 atm. Not a linear measure of depth. Generally defined as the pressure exerted by a foot depth of seawater having a specific gravity of 1.027 and is approximately equal to 0.445 pounds per square inch.
FFM

FFSM

ffw
FFW

Feet fresh water. Unit of pressure equal to 1/34 atm. Not a linear measure of depth.

Subsection: Top, Fa, Fe, Fi, Fo, Fu

== Fi ==
filling ratio
Ratio of the mass of gas in a cylinder to the internal volume of the cylinder (water capacity), usually expressed in kilograms per litre, or pounds per cubic foot.
filling whip

High pressure flexible hose used to connect a cylinder to the storage cylinder, filling panel, booster or compressor, through which high pressure gas flows to fill the cylinder.
filtration

Process for removing impurities from a fluid. Particulates are commonly removed by passing the fluid through porous material with pore size small enough to trap the particles (e.g. micron filters). Liquids and gases are commonly absorbed or adsorbed by the surface of the filter medium (e.g. activated carbon, molecular sieve, silica gel), or may be chemically combined with the medium (e.g. Sodalime) or catalytically converted (e.g. Hopcalite) into a less objectionable substance.
fin keepers
fin retainers

Y-shaped elastic rubber straps worn over the arch, the heel and the instep of each foot to help prevent swim-fins from falling off the diver's feet. Mainly used with full-foot-pocket fins.
fin strike
Fin impact
Impact of a swimfin on the solid environment, usually unintentional, sometimes causing environmental damage
first stage

Diving regulator component which reduces gas pressure from storage pressure in the cylinder to interstage pressure for supply to the second stage and for suit and buoyancy compensator inflation.
five nines
five nines purity
99.999% pure gas. Usually referring to breathing grade oxygen or helium for blending.
fixed diving system
A diving system (q.v.) installed permanently on a vessel or structure.
floating setpoint

flood-up valve

A valve in a diving bell which allows air to escape and internal water level to rise. This can be useful to assist the bellman in recovering an incapacitated diver through the bottom hatch.
flow
Movement of water through a cave or ducting system. Similar in meaning to current in open water.
fluorocarbon elastomers

Synthetic elastomers (rubber) with good performance in high partial pressures of oxygen. Preferred material for o-rings in diving regulators for oxygen service.
flush

flutter kick

finning style where the fins are alternately moved up and down by movements of the full leg. Thrust is developed on both up and down strokes. Vortices shed move both upwards and downwards. See also modified flutter kick.
FMEA

FMECA

Subsection: Top, Fa, Fe, Fi, Fo, Fu

== Fo ==
fogging

Condensation of water vapour on the inside surface of a mask or helmet faceplate, reducing visibility.
forward dive profile
forward profile
Repetitive dive which is shallower than the previous dive.
Multilevel dive in which a later level is shallower than an earlier level.
forward roll entry

Water entry technique used by scuba divers from a boat or platform too high or unsuitable for backward roll entry. The diver bends forward at the hips and waist and falls forward into the water, making a partial somersault and breaking the water with the cylinder, back and shoulders. Not suitable for heights more than about 2 m, and can be problematic if the diver is carrying several heavy items like stage cylinders or large cameras.
four-wire system
Voice communications using separate wire pairs for each direction.
frame
Transportable assemblies of gas cylinders connected by a manifold and securely mounted to a structural framework. See also quad and kelly.
free air

Air at normal atmospheric pressure.
free-diving

Underwater diving that does not involve the use of external breathing apparatus, but relies on a diver's ability to hold their breath until resurfacing. See also breath-hold diving, and apnea (q.v.)
free-flow
1. Constant flow rate air supply
2. See: Mechanism of diving regulators#Free-flow
Malfunction of a demand regulator where the valve sticks in the open position, causing a continuous flow.
free-flow helmet

A helmet where the breathing air supply is supplied at an adjustable, but approximately constant rate regardless of the diver's instantaneous breathing rate.
free-flow valve
Valve on the side of a demand helmet or full-face mask which opens a continuous flow of breathing gas into the helmet interior, usually directed over the interior of the viewport, hence alternative term defogging valve, as it is often used to blow condensation from the inside of the viewport.
free gas
Gas at normal atmospheric pressure. Usually refers to the volume of some amount of compressed gas when allowed to expand to atmospheric pressure at constant temperature
free gas volume
Equivalent volume of a compressed gas if expanded to standard atmospheric pressure at constant temperature.
Frenzel maneuver

Technique for equalising the middle ear by pinching the nose closed and moving the back of the tongue upwards.
frog kick

Finning technique where thrust is developed by sweeping the fins horizontally toward each other with the fins twisted into a nearly vertical plane, with the soles facing each other, followed by a recovery stroke which develops negligible thrust where the fin blades are feathered. The legs are fairly straight during the power stroke. See also: modified frog kick.
frogman

A scuba diver, particularly a military diver on an undercover mission.
fsw

Subsection: Top, Fa, Fe, Fi, Fo, Fu

== Fu ==
full duplex

Voice communication system where both users can transmit and receive at the same time. Compare with half duplex
full-face mask

Diving mask covering the eyes, nose and mouth, and which provides the diver with breathing gas
full-face snorkel mask

Diving mask with one or more shut-off valve fitted breathing tubes, covering the eyes, nose and mouth and supplying the user with atmospheric air while face down on, or slightly below, the surface of the water

== G ==
| Contents: Top | A | B | C | D | E | F | G | H | I | J | K | L | M | N | O | P | Q | R | S | T | U | V | W | X | Y | Z | References |

Subsection: Top, Ga, Ge, Gi, Go, Gu

== Ga ==
gap

The space between two cave guidelines. Usually between a main guideline and the start tie-off of a branch line.
gap spool

A relatively short length of cave line on a spool used to bridge a gap between lines when making an excursion from the main guideline to a branch guideline. The line is left in place during the excursion, and usually retrieved on the way out
gaiter

Textile legging wrapped around the calf and ankle area over a dry suit to restrict the amount of air that can get into the lower leg area. Also can reduce drag of the suit in this area by smoothing over creases and folds.
gas
1. Breathing gas
2. Breathing gas mixture containing helium as a diluent (in commercial diving), see gas diving, gas man
gas blender
1. Person who mixes breathing gases for diving, filling diving cylinders with gas mixes such as nitrox or trimix.
2. Certification of competence to mix breathing gases for diving.
gas blending

Mixing breathing gases for diving, filling diving cylinders with gas mixes such as nitrox or trimix.
gas block

gas diving

Diving while breathing a helium bases gas mixture (commercial diving expression)
gas embolism

Blockage of a blood vessel by a bubble of gas.
gas extender
Carbon dioxide scrubber used to allow partial recirculation of surface-supplied or scuba breathing gas to reduce waste. A form of semi-closed circuit rebreather.
gaseous impurities
Contaminants in the compressed breathing air or gas mixture which are in gaseous form. Compare with particulate and condensate impurities.
gas integration
gas-integrated dive computer

Technology to display gas pressure in a scuba cylinder on a dive computer, and in some cases make further use of the information for gas management.
gas fraction

The fraction by molecular count, volume or pressure (they all come to the same thing) of a specific gas in a mixture of gases.
gas man

Member of a surface-supplied diving team responsible for operating the gas panel
gas matching

The calculation of reserve and turn pressures for divers using different cylinder volumes on the same dive, allowing each diver to ensure that sufficient gas is retained at all times to allow for foreseeable contingencies based on each diver's cylinder volumes, and both divers' individual gas consumption rates.
gas narcosis

gas panel

The control equipment for providing breathing gas to surface supplied divers via umbilicals. Primary and reserve gas is supplied to the panel through shutoff valves from low pressure compressors or high pressure storage cylinders.
gas reversal point
The depth during an ascent or decompression when the intake of dissolved gas is exceeded by outgassing.
gas sensor
A component that produces a signal in the presence of a specific gas, often in proportion to the concentration of the gas.
gas switching

The procedure of changing from one breathing gas mixture to another during a dive. This may be done to avoid oxygen toxicity, hypoxia, or nitrogen narcosis, to accelerate decompression, or to avoid running out of breathing gas. Generally applied to open circuit breathing equipment, where a physical change-over of gas source is made. In closed circuit systems the gas composition is continuously controlled to follow the chosen set-point.
gas switching block
A valve set used for switching from one breathing gas to another during a dive. The most common application is a bailout block, but also used to switch gases for decompression on a full face mask, and to switch between deep and shallow gases on a semi-closed rebreather.
gauge mode

Operating mode for a personal dive computer where the decompression calculation is disabled, and the unit operated only as a timer and depth gauge. Typically used when diving with gas mixtures not supported by the algorithm, in which case decompression tables are used to monitor and control the decompression schedule. Some dive computers will automatically switch to gauge mode if the diver violates a depth limit, leaving the diver without decompression information.
gauge pressure

Gauge pressure is zero-referenced against ambient air pressure, so it is equal to absolute pressure minus atmospheric pressure
gauge snubber
A needle valve or small bore orifice between the pressure supply and the gauge which damps pressure fluctuations.
Gay-Lussac's law

Relation between temperature and pressure in an ideal gas for a constant volume.

Subsection: Top, Ga, Ge, Gi, Go, Gu

== Ge ==
general gas equation
general gas law
1. Relation between the variables pressure, volume and temperature for a given mass of a given mixture of an ideal gas.
2. Thermodynamic equation of state for gases for the variables volume, pressure, temperature and number and atomic weight of molecules.
giant stride entry

glossopharangeal insufflation

A method used by freedivers for filling the lungs with more air than maximal inspiration to normal total lung capacity (TLC). After a full inhalation, the diver fills the mouth with air, while the glottis remains closed, then opens the glottis and forces this air into the lung using the cheeks and tongue to reduce the mouth volume. This may be repeated several times.
glowstick
A single-use, translucent plastic tube containing isolated substances that, when combined, make light through chemiluminescence
gnarly
A general purpose adjective to denote a particularly difficult section of a cave, which may be low, tight, silty, etc. or a combination.

Subsection: Top, Ga, Ge, Gi, Go, Gu

== Go ==
go into decompression
Incur a decompression obligation. Generally refers to having a theoretical tissue inert gas concentration that requires the diver to make staged decompression stops during ascent to avoid an unacceptable risk of symptomatic decompression sickness according to the decompression model, algorithm, tables or dive computer in use.
golden rule
The convention in cave diving that anyone can turn the dive at any time for any reason.
gold line
The permanent main guideline in a cave system, that usually starts well inside the cave. Often yellow or gold in colour.
Goodman handle
A handle used to carry the primary dive light head comprising a rigid slot through which the fingers and palm of the hand are extended, so that the light rests on the back of the hand, facing the direction of the extended fingers.
GPS

A satellite navigation system that provides location and time information in all weather, anywhere on or near the Earth, where there is an unobstructed line of sight to four or more GPS satellites
gradient factor

A way of modifying the M-values of a decompression algorithm to more conservative values in proportion to depth. Often used to bias the algorithm towards deeper stops by using a smaller value for the deeper value.
Subsection: Top, Ga, Ge, Gi, Go, Gu

== Gu ==
guide line
