= Mushroom valve =

Mushroom valve may refer to:

- The exhaust valve of a diving mechanism
- Poppet valve, a rigid flow control valve commonly used in engines and pumps
