= Mechanism of diving regulators =

Arrangement and function of the components of regulators for underwater diving

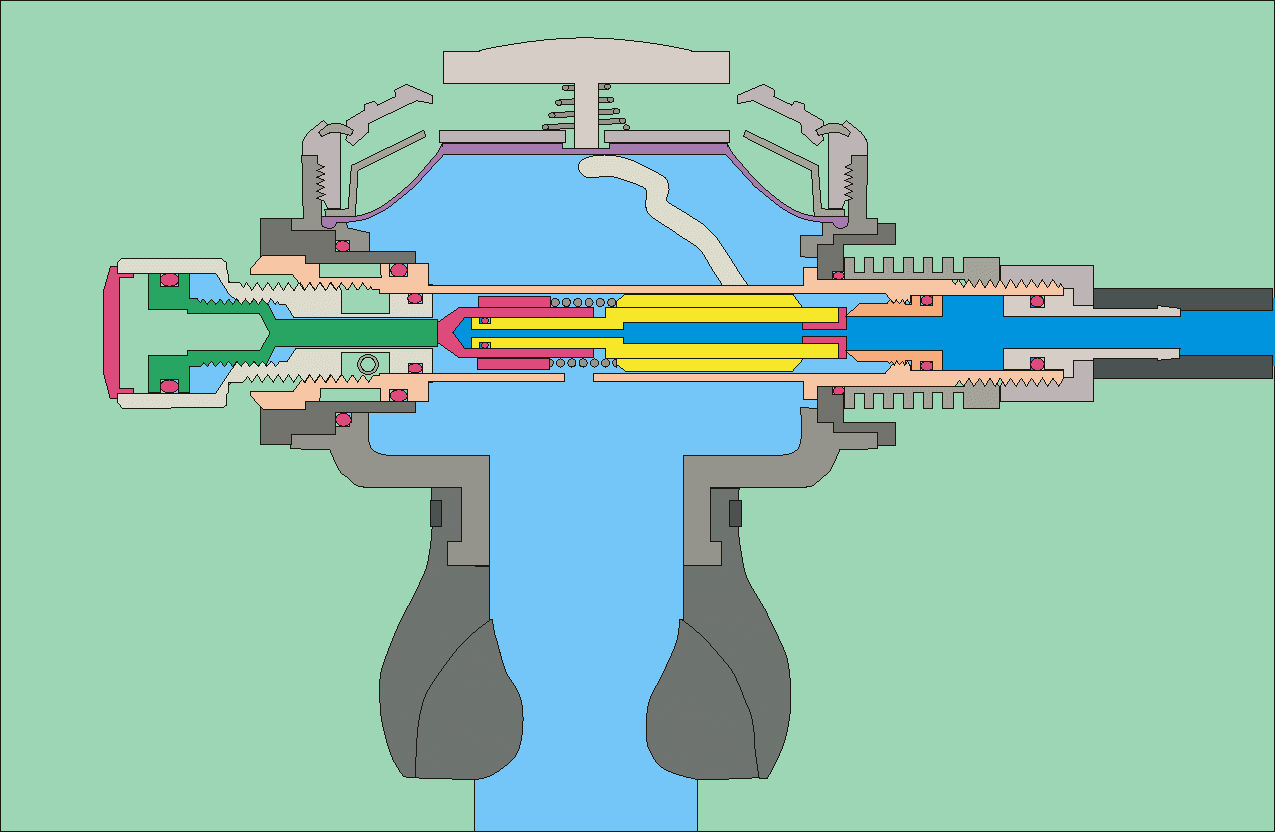
The purge button (top-centre) is held away from the diaphragm by a spring. The valve is closed.

The mechanism of diving regulators is the arrangement of components and function of gas pressure regulators used in the systems which supply breathing gases for underwater diving. Both free-flow and demand regulators use mechanical feedback of the downstream pressure to control the opening of a valve which controls gas flow from the upstream, high-pressure side, to the downstream, low-pressure side of each stage. Flow capacity must be sufficient to allow the downstream pressure to be maintained at maximum demand, and sensitivity must be appropriate to deliver maximum required flow rate with a small variation in downstream pressure, and for a large variation in supply pressure, without instability of flow. Open circuit scuba regulators must also deliver against a variable ambient pressure. They must be robust and reliable, as they are life-support equipment which must function in the relatively hostile seawater environment, and the human interface must be comfortable over periods of several hours.

Diving regulators use mechanically operated valves. In most cases there is ambient pressure feedback to both first and second stage, except where this is avoided to allow constant mass flow through an orifice in a rebreather, which requires a constant absolute upstream pressure. Back-pressure regulators are used in gas reclaim systems to conserve expensive helium based breathing gases in surface-supplied diving, and to control the safe exhaust of exhaled gas from built-in breathing systems in hyperbaric chambers.

The parts of a regulator are described here as the major functional groups in downstream order following the gas flow from the cylinder to its final use. Details may vary considerably between manufacturers and models.

== Types of diving regulators ==
Gas pressure regulators are used for several applications in the supply and handling of breathing gases for diving. Pressure reducing regulators are used to reduce gas pressure for supply to the diver in demand and free-flow open circuit breathing apparatus, in rebreather equipment, and in gas blending procedures. Back-pressure regulators are used in the exhaust systems of the built-in breathing systems of diving chambers, and in the recovery of used helium based breathing gas for recycling. Some of these regulators must work underwater, others in the more forgiving conditions of the surface support area. All must work consistently and reliably, but some are parts of safety-critical life-support systems, where a single point of failure must not put lives at risk.

== Open-circuit scuba regulators ==
=== Connection to the high pressure supply ===
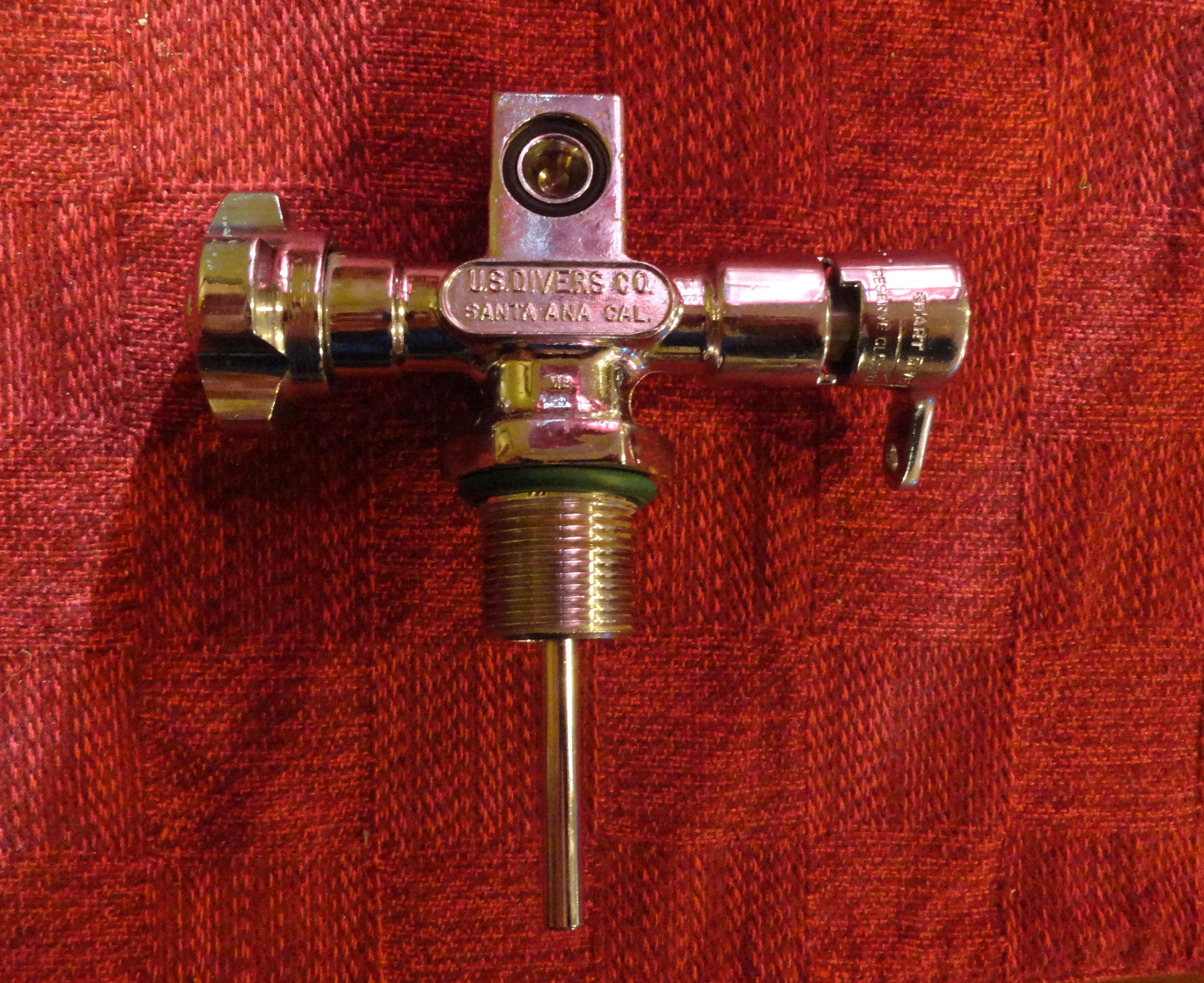
A 1964 scuba cylinder valve with reserve, commonly known as a "type J" valve. The inlet is threaded 3/4"-14 NPSM and the outlet is a standard CGA 850 yoke type.

The first-stage of the scuba regulator may be connected to the cylinder valve by one of two standard types of fittings. The CGA 850 connector, also known as an international connector, which uses a yoke clamp, or a DIN screw fitting to connect it to the valve of the diving cylinder. There are also European standards for scuba regulator connectors for gases other than air.

==== CGA 850 connection ====
CGA 850 Yoke connectors (sometimes called A-clamps from their shape) are the most popular regulator connection in North America and several other countries. They clamp the high pressure inlet opening of the regulator against the outlet opening of the cylinder valve, and are sealed by an O-ring in a groove in the contact face of the cylinder valve. The user screws the clamp in place finger-tight to hold the metal surfaces of cylinder valve and regulator first stage in contact, compressing the o-ring between the radial faces of valve and regulator. When the valve is opened, gas pressure presses the O-ring against the outer cylindrical surface of the groove, completing the seal. The diver must take care not to screw the yoke down too tightly, or it may prove impossible to remove without tools. Conversely, failing to tighten sufficiently can lead to O-ring extrusion under pressure and a major loss of breathing gas. This can be a serious problem if it happens when the diver is at depth. Yoke fittings are rated up to a maximum of 240 bars (3,500 psi) working pressure.

The outlet of the CGA 850 valve is on a flat surface on the valve body, inside a concentric face-sealing O-ring groove, with a conical indentation on the opposite surface of the valve body, co-axial with the O-ring groove. The yoke clamp fits around the valve body and the sealing face of the regulator inlet seats over the O-ring groove. A conically tipped screw locates in the indentation and when tightened, presses against the valve body and pulls the sealing face of the regulator inlet against the O-ring. This screw must be tightened sufficiently to maintain metal-to-metal contact between the regulator inlet and the valve body when the valve is opened at full cylinder pressure, and under normal working loads including minor impacts and using the regulator as a handle to lift the set, to prevent failure of the seal by O-ring extrusion and consequent loss of breathing gas. The screw must also not be over-tightened, as after use it must be removed by hand. The rigidity of the yoke varies depending on design, tightening is by hand and is left to the discretion of the user. Fortunately the mechanism is fairly tolerant of variation in contact force. When the valve is opened, gas pressure on the O-ring presses it against the outer cylindrical surface of the groove and the face of the regulator inlet, squeezing the O-ring towards the contact surfaces of these parts. The pressure exerts a force to push the regulator away from the valve body, and if pre-load of the screw is insufficient the elasticity of the clamp will allow a gap to form between valve and regulator through which the O-ring may be extruded. When this happens, gas loss is rapid, and the valve must be closed and the clamp loosened, the O-ring inspected and possibly replaced. Recovery from an extruded O-ring underwater is often not possible and bailout to an independent gas supply or an emergency ascent may be necessary.

==== DIN connection ====
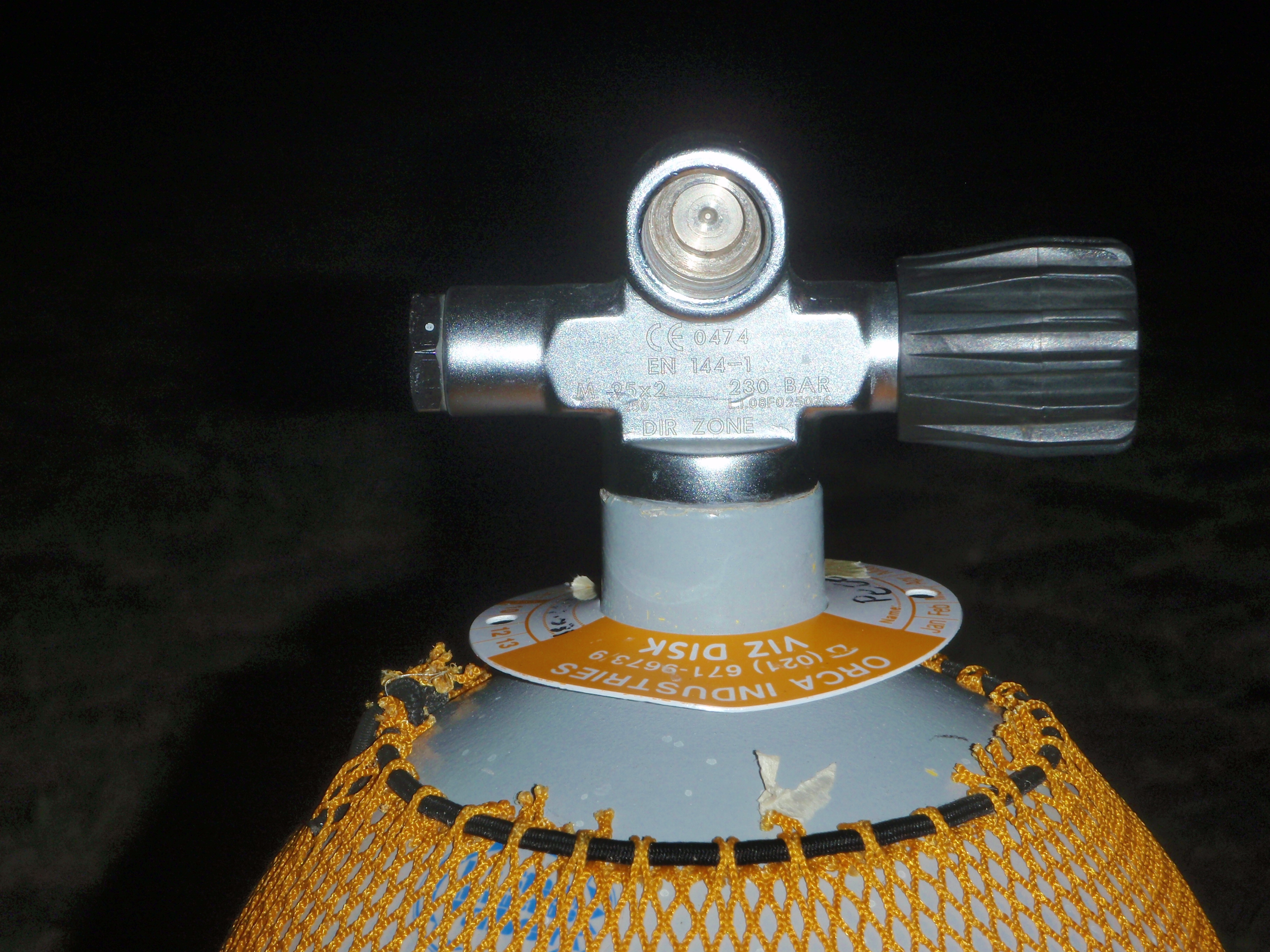
Left side cylinder valve for barrel seal manifold with blanking plug and DIN connection

The DIN fitting is a type of screw-in connection to the cylinder valve. The DIN system is less common worldwide, but has the advantage of withstanding greater pressure, up to 300 bar, allowing use of high-pressure steel cylinders. They are less susceptible to blowing the O-ring seal if banged against something while in use. DIN fittings are the standard in much of Europe and are available in most countries. The DIN fitting is considered more secure and therefore safer by many technical divers.

DIN valves are produced in 232 bar and 300 bar pressure ratings. The number of threads and the detail configuration of the connections is designed to prevent incompatible combinations of filler attachment or regulator attachment with the cylinder valve.

- 232 bar DIN (5-thread, G5/8) Outlet/Connector #13 to DIN 477 part 1.
- 300 bar DIN (7-thread, G5/8) Outlet/Connector #56 to DIN 477 part 5 - these are similar to 5-thread DIN fitting but are rated to 300 bar working pressures. The 300 bar pressures are common in European diving and in US cave diving.

The O-ring groove for sealing the 232 and 300 bar DIN outlet connector to the valve is specified by ISO 12209 standard as having an inside diameter of 12 mm and outside diameter of 17 mm, originally with groove depth of 1.9 mm, increased to 2.0 mm in 2003. The O-ring specification is inside diameter 11.2mm with section diameter 2.65mm. This is very close to the imperial standard size 112 O-ring with nominal dimensions 12.37 millimetres (0.487 in) x 2.62 millimetres (0.103 in), and this O-ring is used on most regulators. A few manufacturers such as Apeks, Atomic and ScubaPro use a slightly smaller groove which fits the size 111 O-ring with nominal dimensions 10.77 millimetres (0.424 in) x 2.62 millimetres (0.103 in) better. Cressi and Poseidon grooves are closer to the original standard and the best fit O-ring is BS ISO 3601 metric size O-ring with nominal dimensions 11.3 mm x 2.4 mm, for which there is no standard imperial equivalent.

==== Adapters ====
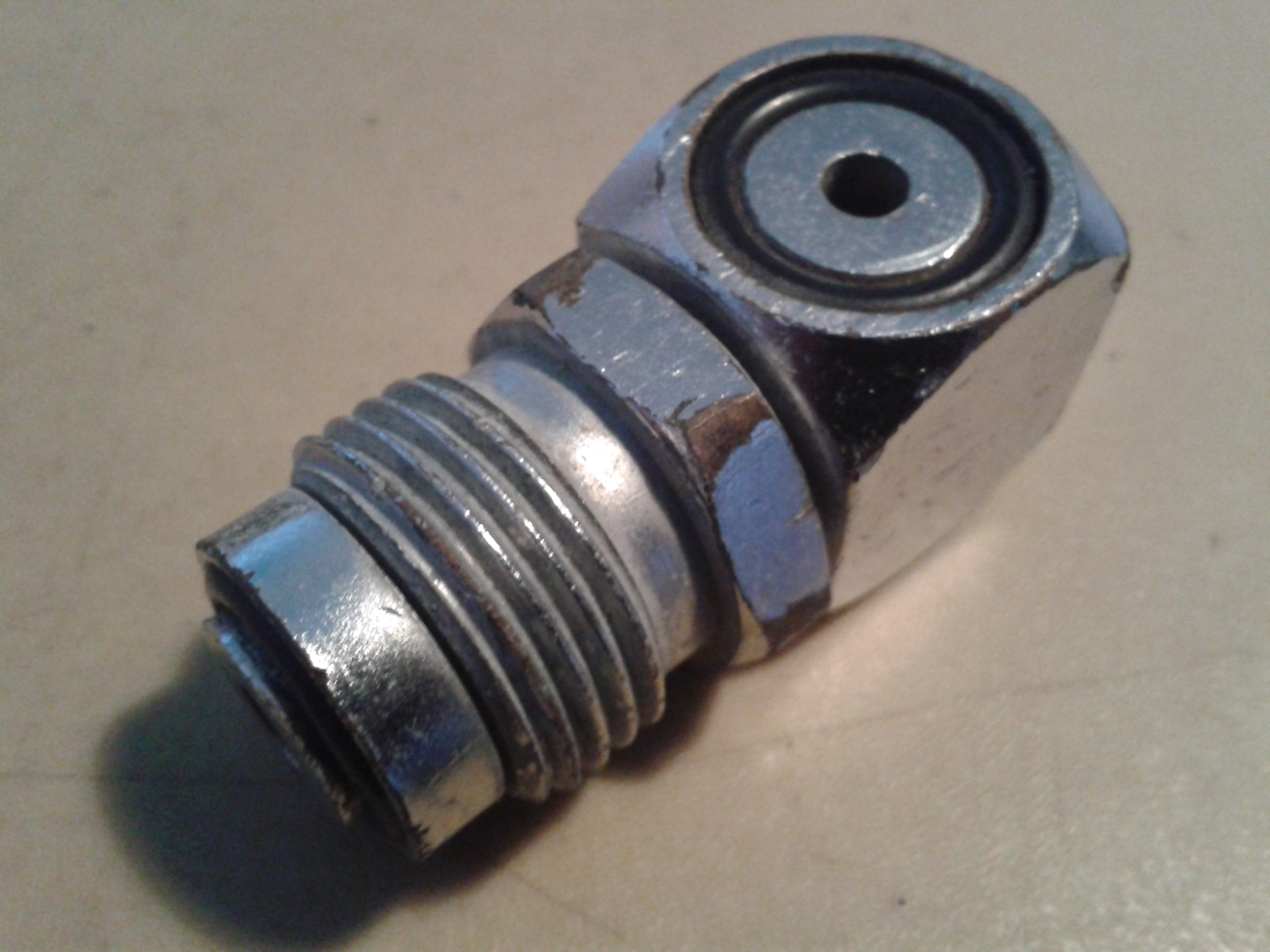
A block adaptor screws into a DIN cylinder valve to allow connection of a yoke regulator

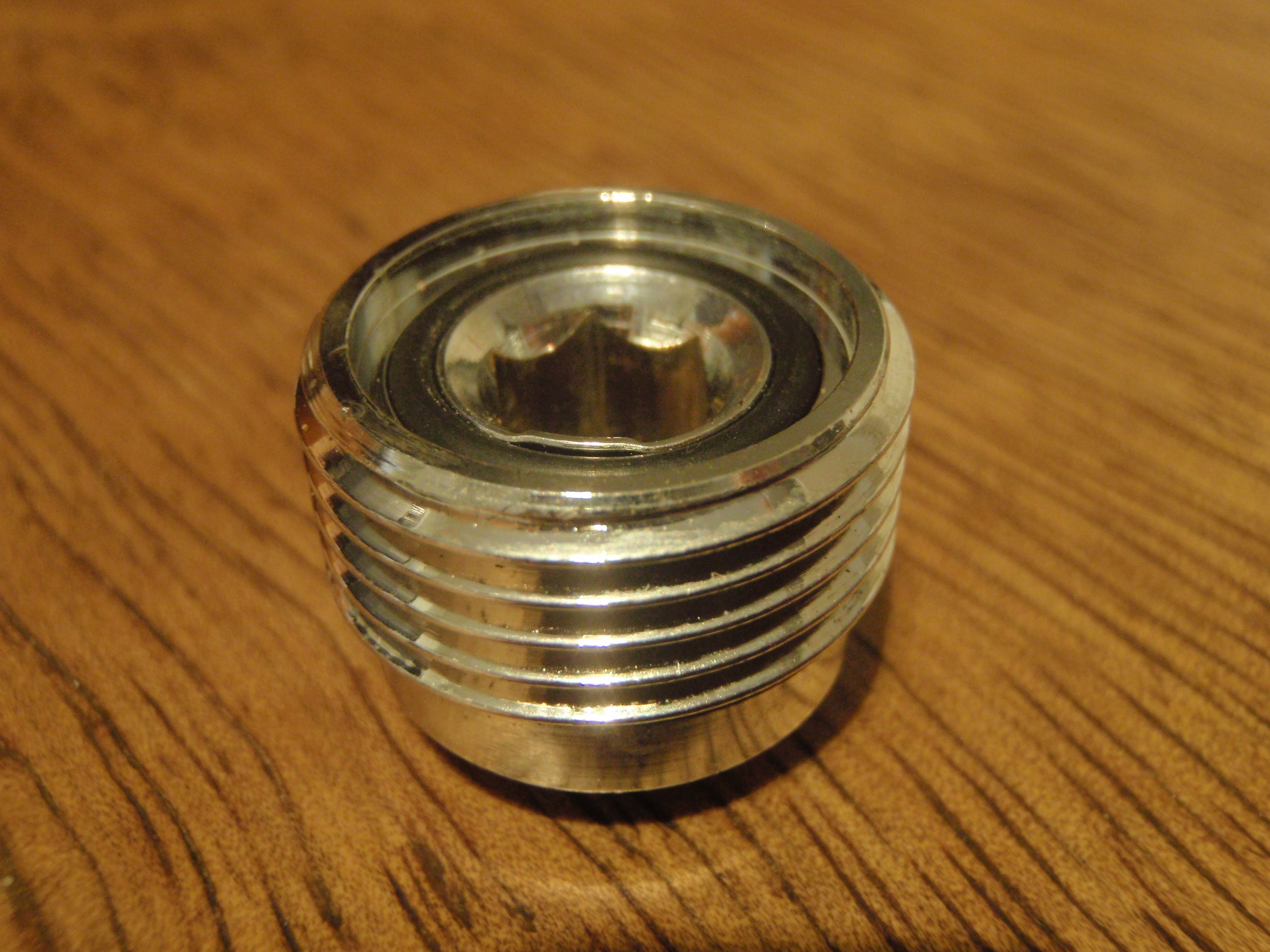
DIN plug adaptor for compatible cylinder valves

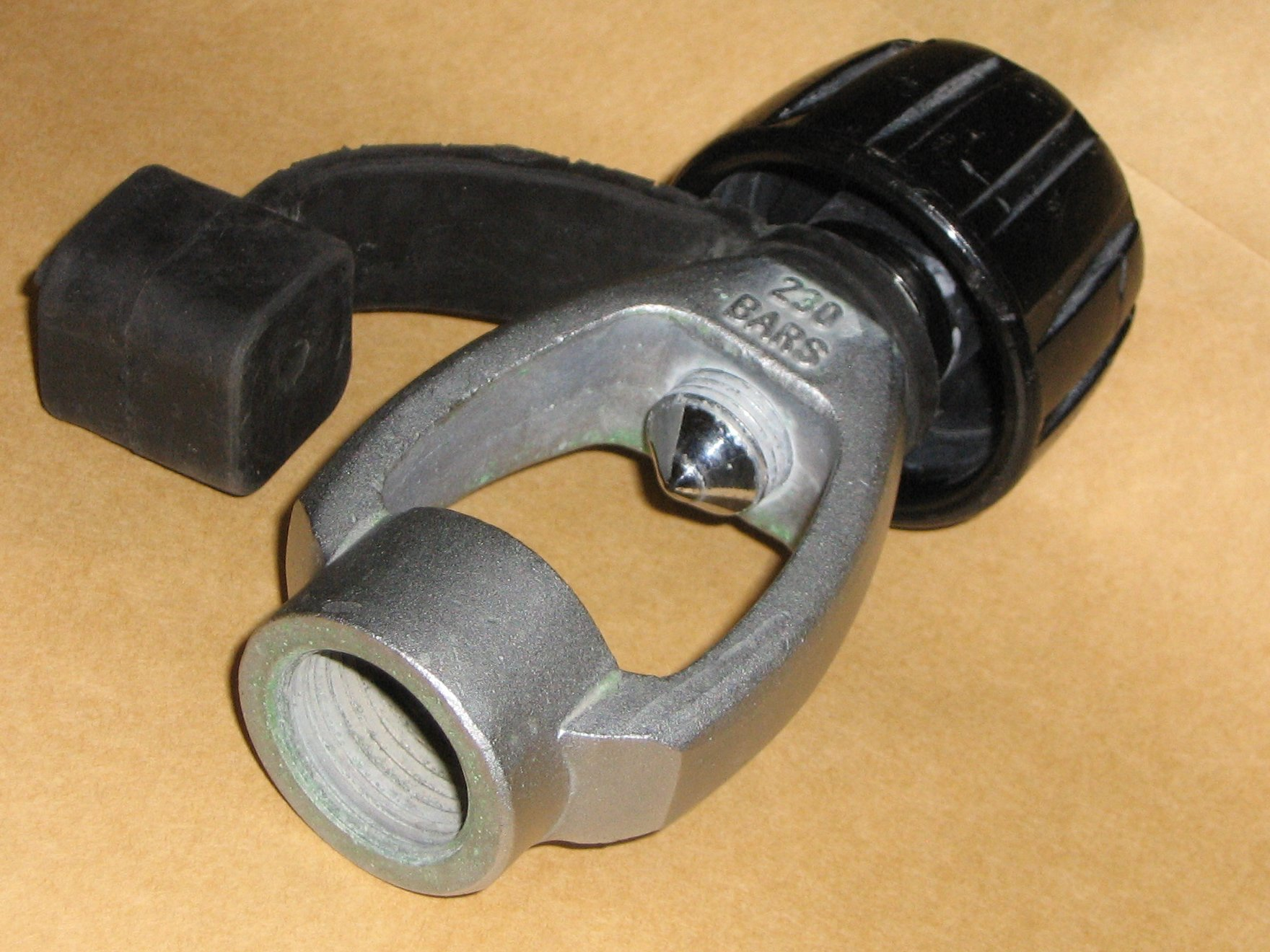
A yoke (A-clamp) to DIN adaptor allows connection of a DIN regulator to a Yoke cylinder valve

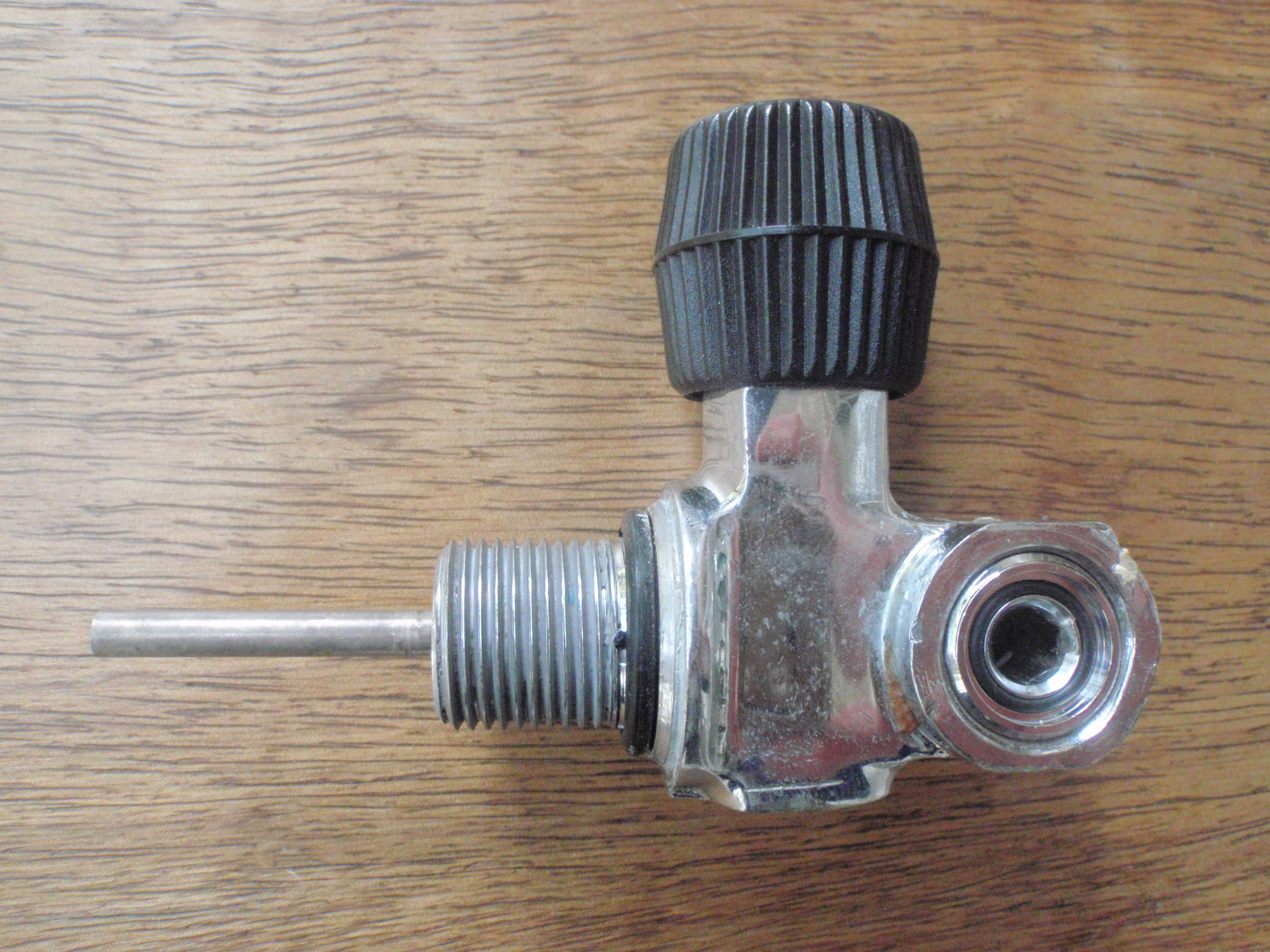
DIN valve with plug adaptor for yoke attachment fitted

Adapters are available enabling a DIN first-stage to be attached to a cylinder with a yoke fitting valve (yoke adapter or A-clamp adapter), and for a yoke first stage to be attached to a DIN cylinder valve (plug adapter and block adapter).

==== Conversion kits ====
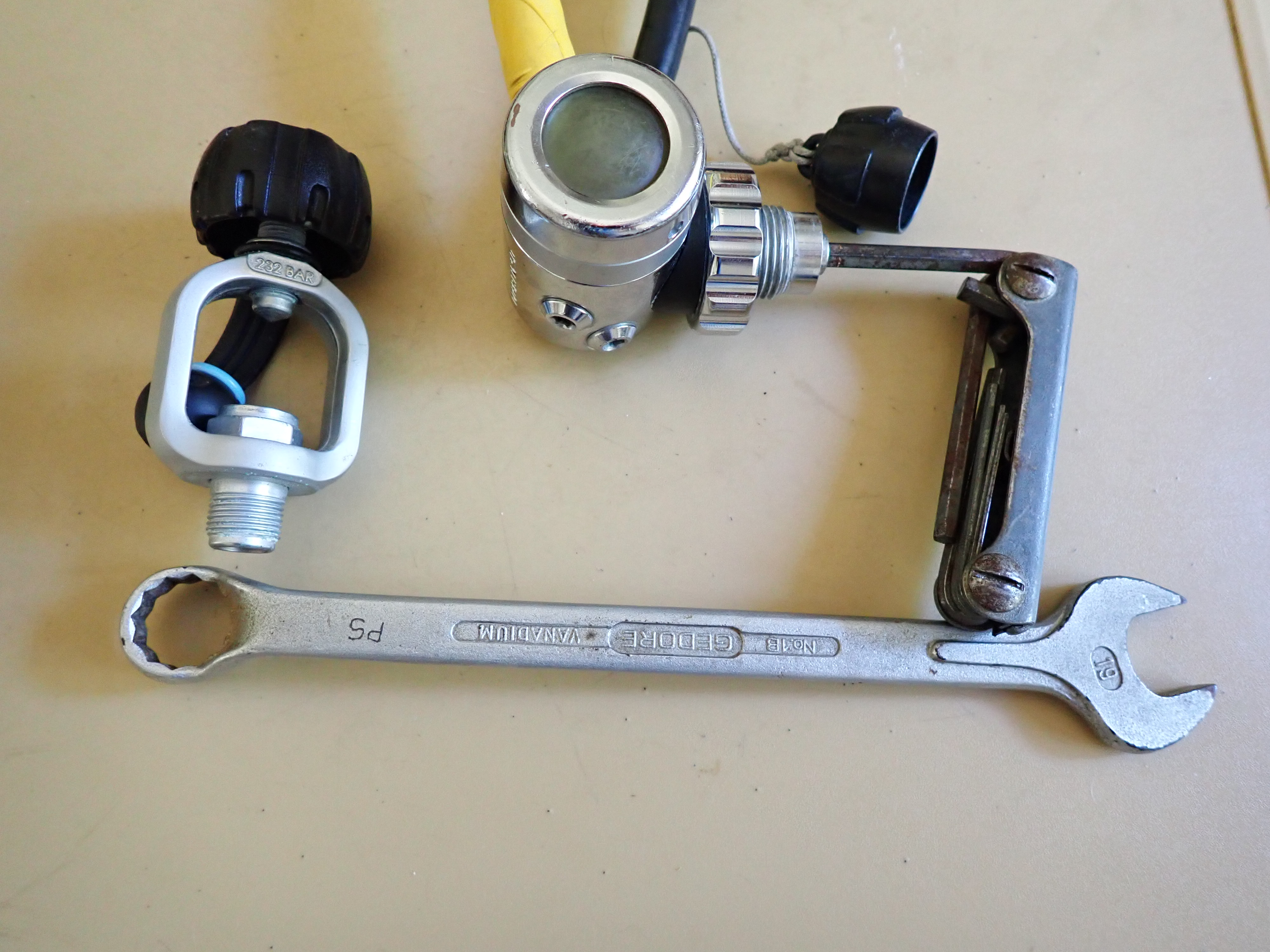
Parts and tools to convert an Apeks first stage diving regulator from DIN to Yoke connector

Several manufacturers market an otherwise identical first stage varying only in the choice of cylinder valve connection. In these cases it may be possible to buy original components to convert yoke to DIN and vice versa. The complexity of the conversion may vary, and parts are not usually interchangeable between manufacturers. The conversion of Apeks regulators is particularly simple and only requires an Allen key and a ring spanner.

==== Other connection types ====
There are also cylinder valves intended for scuba cylinders containing gases other than air:

- The European Norm EN 144-3:2003 introduced a new type of valve, similar to existing 232 bar or 300 bar DIN valves, but with a metric M26×2 thread. These are intended to be used for breathing gas with oxygen content above that normally found in natural air in the Earth's atmosphere (i.e. 22–100%). From August 2008, these were required in the European Union for all diving equipment used with nitrox or pure oxygen. The idea behind this new standard is to force the dedication of cylinders and regulators to Nitrox use, to prevent a rich mixture being filled to a cylinder that is not oxygen clean. However even with use of the new system there still remains nothing except human procedural care to ensure that a cylinder with a new valve remains oxygen-clean - which is exactly how the previous system worked. The O-ring used to seal the M26x2 connector has nominal dimensions of 13.9 millimetres (0.55 in) x 2.6 millimetres (0.10 in), which is a close match to the imperial standard size 113 O-ring. This connection is seldom seen outside the EU.
- An M24x2 male thread cylinder valve was supplied with some Dräger semi-closed circuit recreational rebreathers (Dräger Ray) for use with nitrox mixtures. The regulator supplied with the rebreather had a compatible connection.

==== Cylinder valve types ====
Most scuba cylinder valves are currently of the K-valve type, which is a simple manually operated screw-down on-off valve. In the mid-1960s, J-valves were widespread. J-valves contain a spring-operated valve that restricts or shuts off flow when tank pressure falls to 300-500 psi, causing breathing resistance and warning the diver that he or she is dangerously low on breathing gas. The reserve gas is released by pulling a reserve lever on the valve. J-valves fell out of favor with the introduction of pressure gauges, which allow divers to keep track of their gas underwater, especially as the valve-type is vulnerable to accidental release of reserve air and increases the cost and servicing of the valve. J-valves are occasionally still used when work is done in visibility so poor that the pressure gauge cannot be seen, even with a light. Most side-spindled valves are right handed, meaning that the knob is on the diver's right hand side, but left handed valves are also produced for manifolded sets and other applications where it is more convenient. Axial spindle valves are also available where the spindle lies on the axis of the thread which connects the valve to the cylinder, with the knob on top, and various configurations with dual outlets or connections for scuba manifolds.

=== Single-hose demand regulators ===
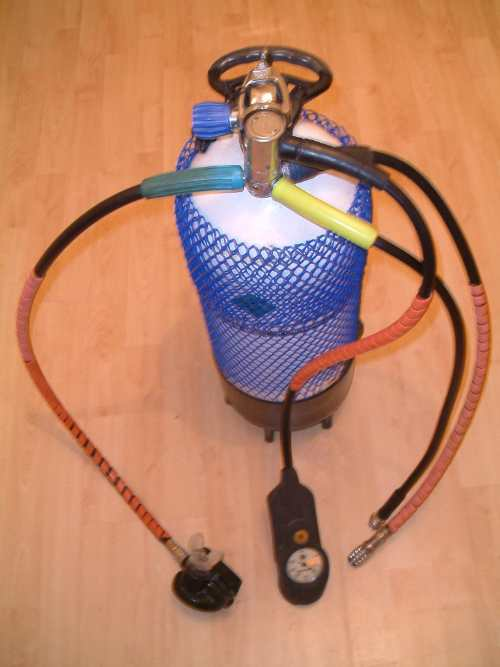
A single-hose regulator fitted to a diving cylinder with the second stage (demand valve) on the left hand hose

Most contemporary diving regulators are single-hose two-stage demand regulators. They consist of a first-stage regulator, and a second-stage demand valve. A low pressure hose connects these components to transfer breathing gas, and allows relative movement within the constraints of hose length and flexibility. Other low pressure hoses supply optional additional components.

==== First stage ====
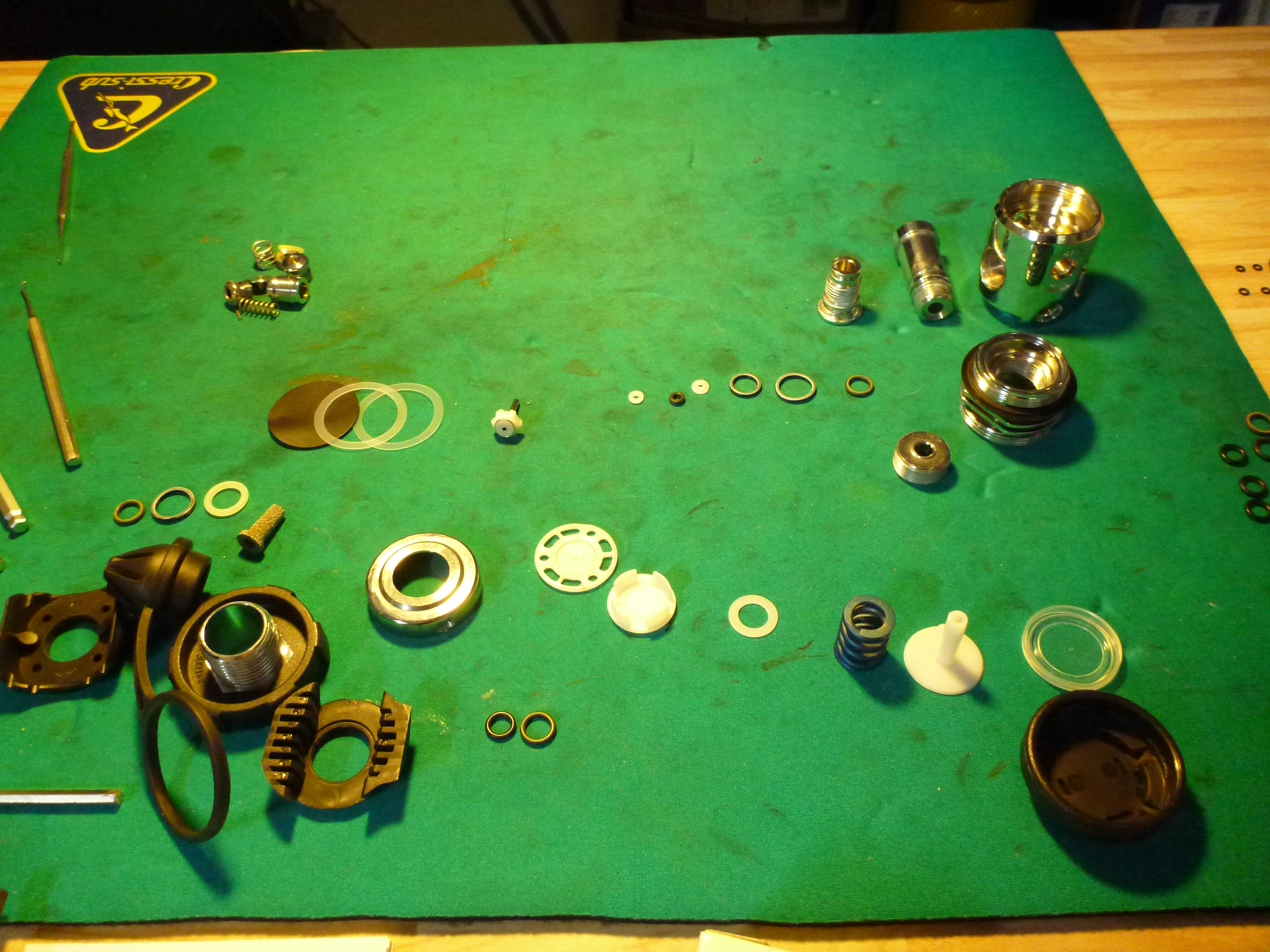
First stage disassembled

The first stage of the regulator is mounted to the cylinder valve or manifold via one of the standard connectors (Yoke or DIN). It reduces cylinder pressure to an intermediate pressure, usually about 8 to 11 bars (120 to 160 psi) higher than the ambient pressure, also called interstage pressure, medium pressure or low pressure. The breathing gas is then supplied to the second stage through a hose.

A balanced regulator first stage automatically keeps a constant pressure difference between the interstage pressure and the ambient pressure even as the tank pressure drops with consumption. The balanced regulator design allows the first stage orifice to be as large as needed without incurring performance degradation as a result of changing tank pressure.

The first stage regulator body generally has several low-pressure outlets (ports) for second-stage regulators, BCD inflators and other equipment; and one or more high-pressure outlets, which allow a submersible pressure gauge (SPG), gas-integrated diving computer or remote wireless pressure transducer to measure the cylinder pressure. The valve may be designed so that one low-pressure port is designated "Reg" for the primary second stage regulator, because that port allows a higher flow rate to give less breathing effort at maximum demand. A small number of manufacturers have produced regulators with a larger than standard hose and port diameter for this primary outlet.

The mechanism inside the first stage can be of the diaphragm type or the piston type. Both types can be balanced or unbalanced. Unbalanced regulators have the cylinder pressure pushing the first stage upstream valve closed, which is opposed by the intermediate stage pressure and a spring. As cylinder pressure falls the closing force is less, so the regulated pressure increases at lower tank pressure. To keep this pressure rise within acceptable limits the high-pressure orifice size is limited, but this decreases the total flow capacity of the regulator. A balanced regulator keeps about the same ease of breathing at all depths and pressures, by using the cylinder pressure to also indirectly oppose the opening of the first stage valve.

===== Piston-type first stage =====
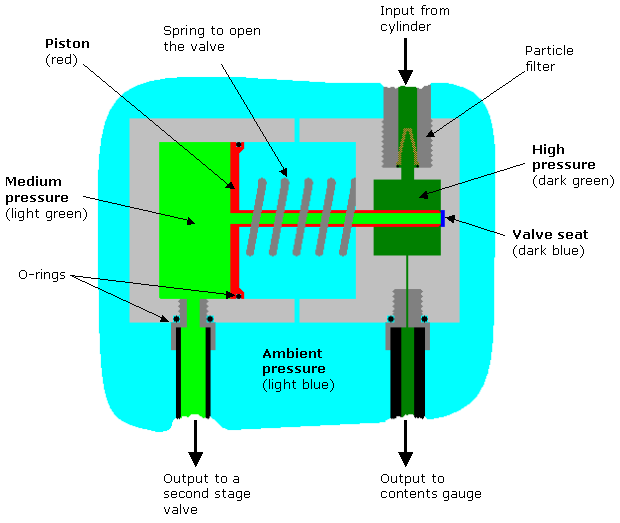
Diagram of the internal components of a balanced piston-type first stage

Some components of piston-type first stages are easier to manufacture and have a simpler design than the diaphragm type. They may need more careful maintenance because some internal moving parts may be exposed to water and any contaminants in the water, so may be more prone to corrosion and buildup of dirt.

The piston in the first stage is rigid and acts directly on the seat of the valve. The pressure in the intermediate pressure chamber drops when the diver inhales from the demand valve, this causes the piston to lift off the stationary valve seat as the piston slides into the intermediate pressure chamber. The now open valve permits high pressure gas to flow into the low pressure chamber until the pressure in the chamber has risen enough to push the piston back into its original position against the seat and thus close the valve.

===== Diaphragm-type first stage =====
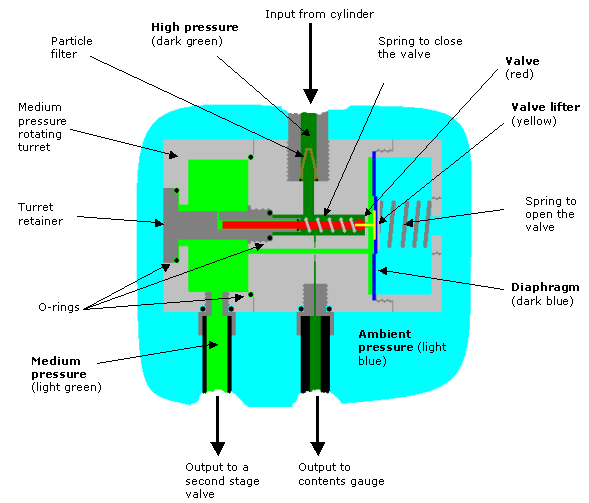
Diagram of the internal components of a diaphragm-type first stage

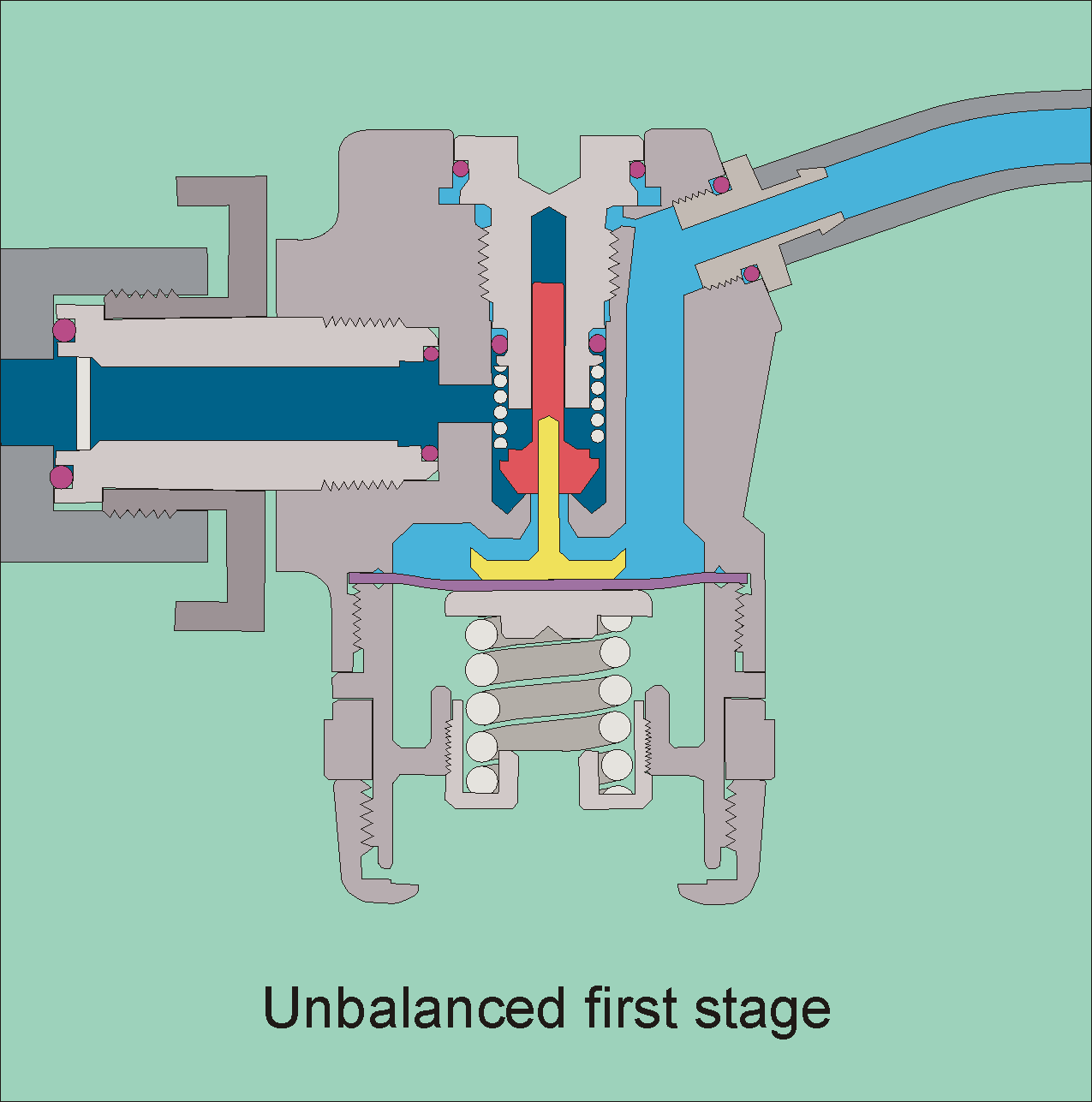
Diagram of the internal components of an unbalanced diaphragm first stage

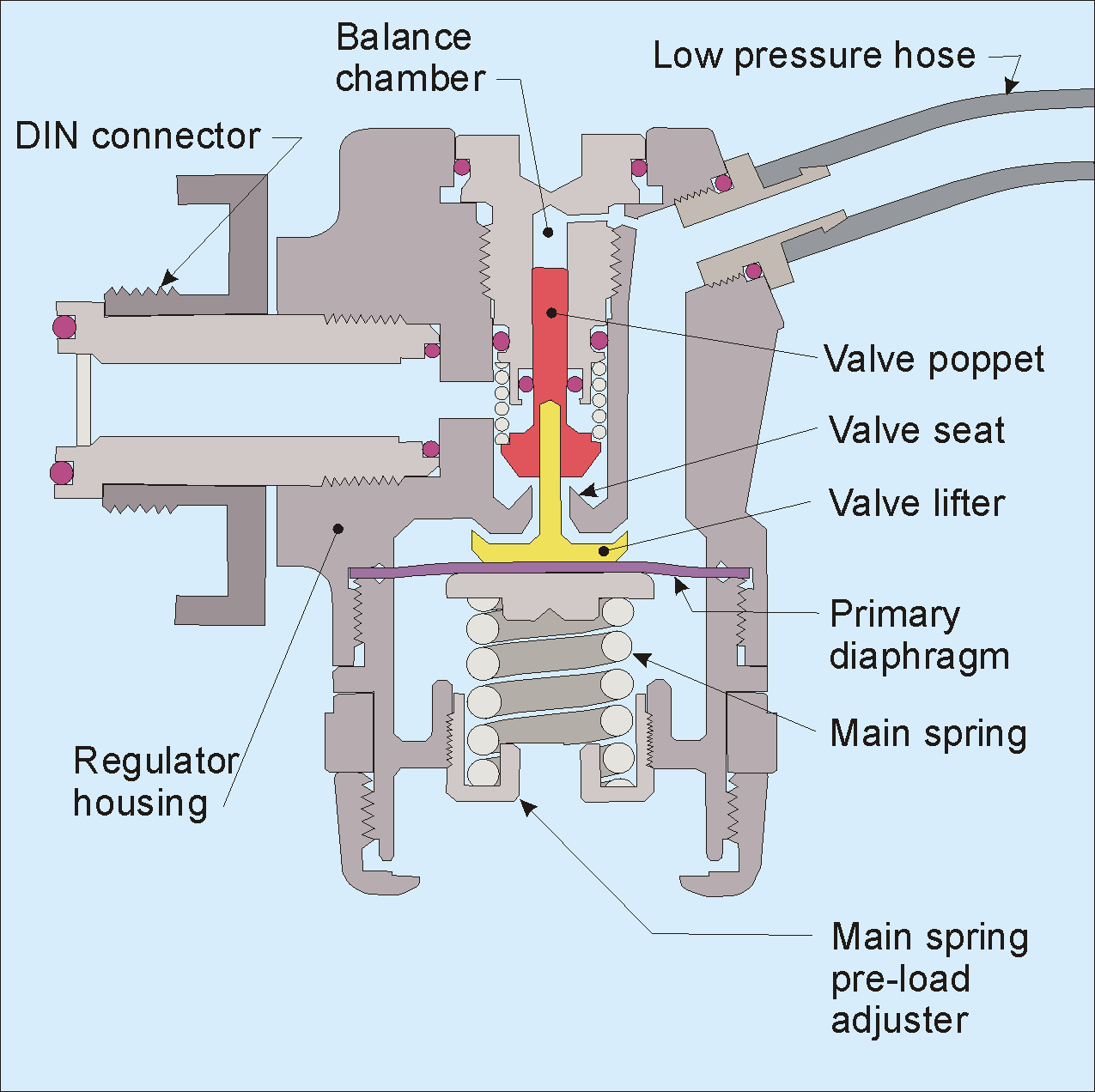
Diagram of the internal components of a balanced diaphragm first stage

Animation of the internal components of a diaphragm-type first stage during the breathing cycle

Diaphragm-type first stages are more complex and have more components than the piston type. Their design makes them particularly suited to cold water diving and to working in saltwater and water containing a high degree of suspended particles, silt, or other contaminating materials, since the only moving parts exposed to the water are the valve opening spring and the diaphragm, all other parts are sealed off from the environment. In some cases the diaphragm and spring are also sealed from the environment.

The diaphragm is a flexible cover to the interstage (intermediate) pressure chamber. When the diver consumes gas from the second stage, the pressure falls in the low pressure chamber and the diaphragm deforms inwards pushing against the valve lifter. This opens the high pressure valve permitting gas to flow past the valve seat into the low pressure chamber. When the diver stops inhaling, pressure in the low pressure chambers rises and the diaphragm returns to its neutral flat position and no longer presses on the valve lifter, shutting off the flow until the next breath is taken.

===== Balancing =====
If a regulator stage has an architecture that compensates for a change of upstream pressure on the moving parts of the valve so that a change in supply pressure does not affect the force required to open the valve, the stage is described as balanced. Upstream and downstream valves, first and second stages, and diaphragm and piston operation can be balanced or unbalanced, and a full description of a stage will specify which of all of these options apply. For example, a regulator may have a balanced piston first stage with a balanced downstream second stage. Both balanced and unbalanced piston first stages are fairly common, but most diaphragm first stages are balanced. Balancing the first stage has a greater overall effect on the performance of a regulator, as the variation in supply pressure from the cylinder is much greater than the variation in interstage pressure, even with an unbalanced first stage. However the second stage operates on very a small pressure differential and is more sensitive to variations in supply pressure. Most top range regulators have at least one balanced stage, but it is not clear that balancing both stages makes a noticeable difference to performance.

==== Interstage hose ====
An intermediate-pressure, medium pressure, or low pressure hose, is used to carry breathing gas (typically at between 8 and 10 bar above ambient) from the first stage regulator to the second stage, or demand valve, which is held in the mouth by the diver, or attached to the full face mask or diving helmet. The standard interstage hose is 30 inches (76 cm) long, but 40 inches (100 cm) hoses are standard for Octopus regulators and 7 feet (2.1 m) hoses are popular for technical diving, particularly for cave and wreck penetration where space constraints may make it necessary to swim in single file while sharing gas. Other lengths are also available. Most low pressure ports are threaded 3/8" UNF, but a few regulators were marketed with one 1/2" UNF port intended for the primary demand valve. High pressure ports are almost exclusively 7/16" UNF. There is no possibility of connecting a hose to the wrong pressure port.

==== Second stage ====
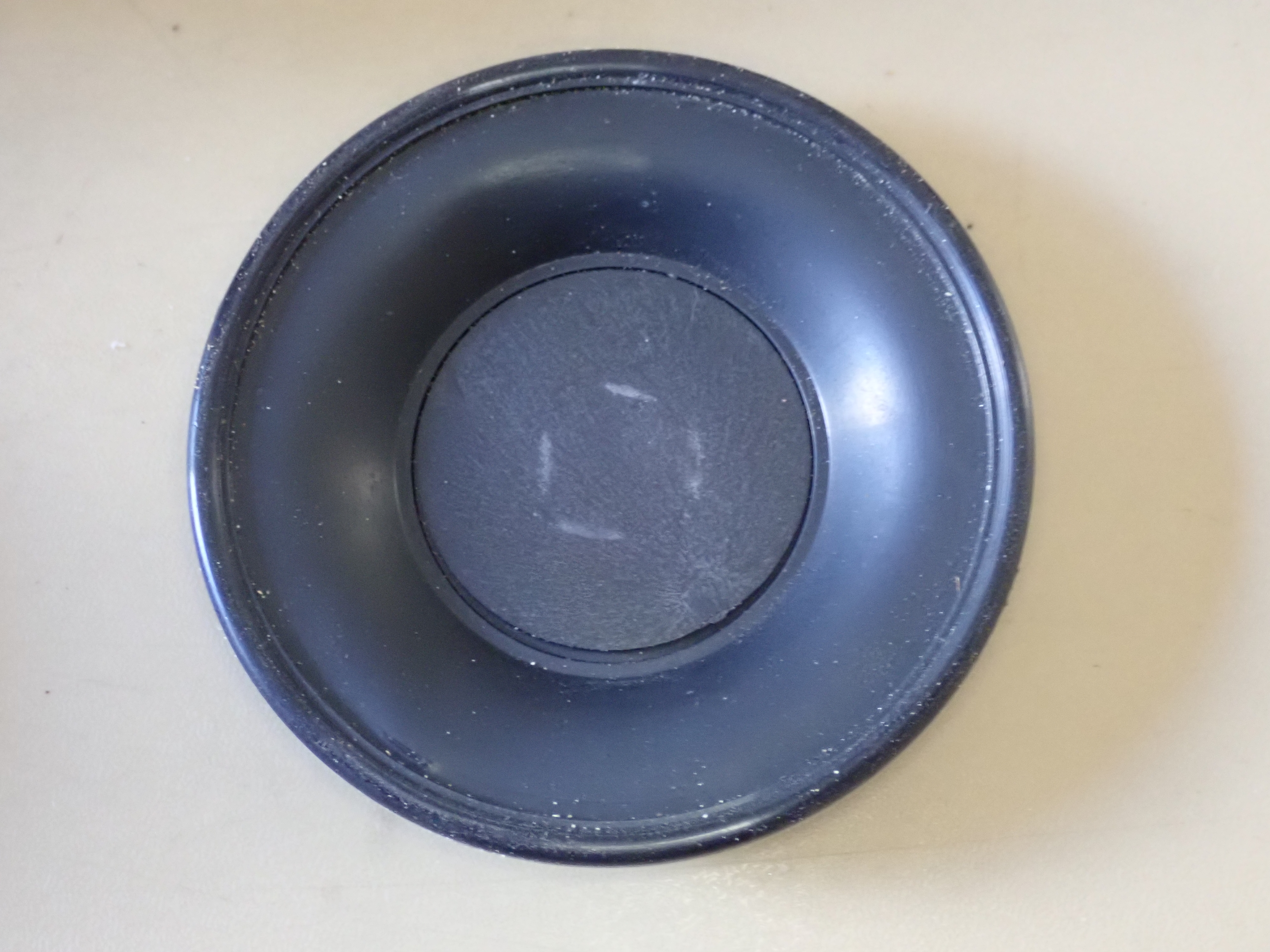
Second stage diaphragm for Apeks demand valve

The second stage, or demand valve reduces the pressure of the interstage air supply to ambient pressure on demand from the diver. The operation of the valve is triggered by a drop in downstream pressure as the diver breathes in. The pressure difference over the diaphragm required to initiate opening of the valve is known as the cracking pressure.

===== Upstream valves =====
In an upstream valve, the moving part works against the pressure and opens in the opposite direction to the flow of gas. They are often made as tilt-valves, which are mechanically extremely simple and reliable, but are not amenable to fine tuning.

If the first stage leaks and the inter-stage over-pressurizes, the second stage downstream valve opens automatically resulting in a "freeflow". With an upstream valve, the result of over-pressurization may be a blocked valve. This will stop the supply of breathing gas and possibly result in a ruptured hose or the failure of another second stage valve, such as one that inflates a buoyancy device. When a second stage upstream tilt valve is used a relief valve should be included by the manufacturer on the first stage regulator to protect the intermediate hose.

If a shut-off valve is fitted between the first and second stages, as is found on scuba bailout systems used for commercial diving and in some technical diving configurations, the demand valve will normally be isolated and unable to function as a relief valve. In this case an overpressure valve must be fitted to the first stage if it does not already have one. As very few contemporary (2016) scuba regulator first stages are factory fitted with overpressure relief valves, they are available as aftermarket accessories which can be screwed into any low pressure port available on the first stage.

===== Downstream valves =====
Most modern demand valves use a downstream rather than an upstream valve mechanism. In a downstream valve, the moving part of the valve opens in the same direction as the flow of gas and is kept closed by a spring. The usual form of downstream valve is a spring-loaded poppet with a hard elastomer seat sealing against an adjustable metal "crown" around the inlet orifice. The poppet is lifted away from the crown by a lever operated by the diaphragm. Two patterns are commonly used. One is the classic push-pull arrangement, where the actuating lever goes onto the end of the valve shaft and is held on by a nut. Any deflection of the lever is converted to an axial pull on the valve shaft, lifting the seat off the crown and allowing air to flow. The other is the barrel poppet arrangement, where the poppet is enclosed in a tube which crosses the regulator body and the lever operates through slots in the sides of the tube. The far end of the tube is accessible from the side of the casing and a spring tension adjustment screw may be fitted for limited diver control of the cracking pressure. This arrangement also allows relatively simple pressure balancing of the second stage.

A downstream valve will function as an over-pressure valve when the inter-stage pressure is raised sufficiently to overcome the spring pre-load. If the first stage leaks and the inter-stage over-pressurizes, the second stage downstream valve opens automatically. if the leak is bad this could result in a "freeflow", but a slow leak will generally cause intermittent "popping" of the DV, as the pressure is released and slowly builds up again.

===== Servo-controlled valves =====
Some demand valves use a small, sensitive pilot valve to control the opening of the main valve. The Poseidon Jetstream and Xstream and Oceanic Omega second stages are examples of this technology. They can produce very high flow rates for a small pressure differential, and particularly for a relatively small cracking pressure, or a small actuating diaphragm area. They are generally more complicated and expensive to service.

===== Exhaust valves =====
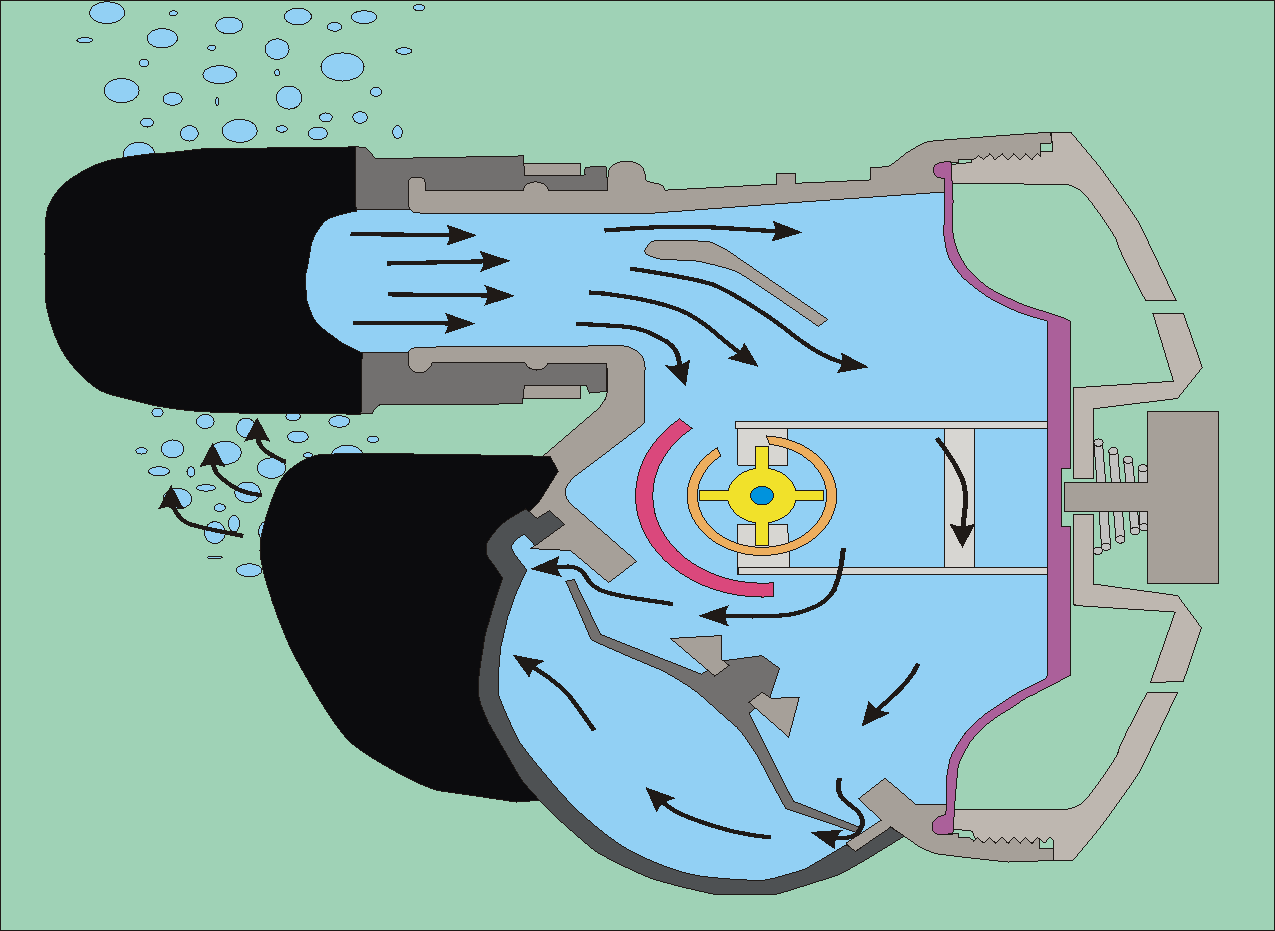
Air flow through the exhaust valve

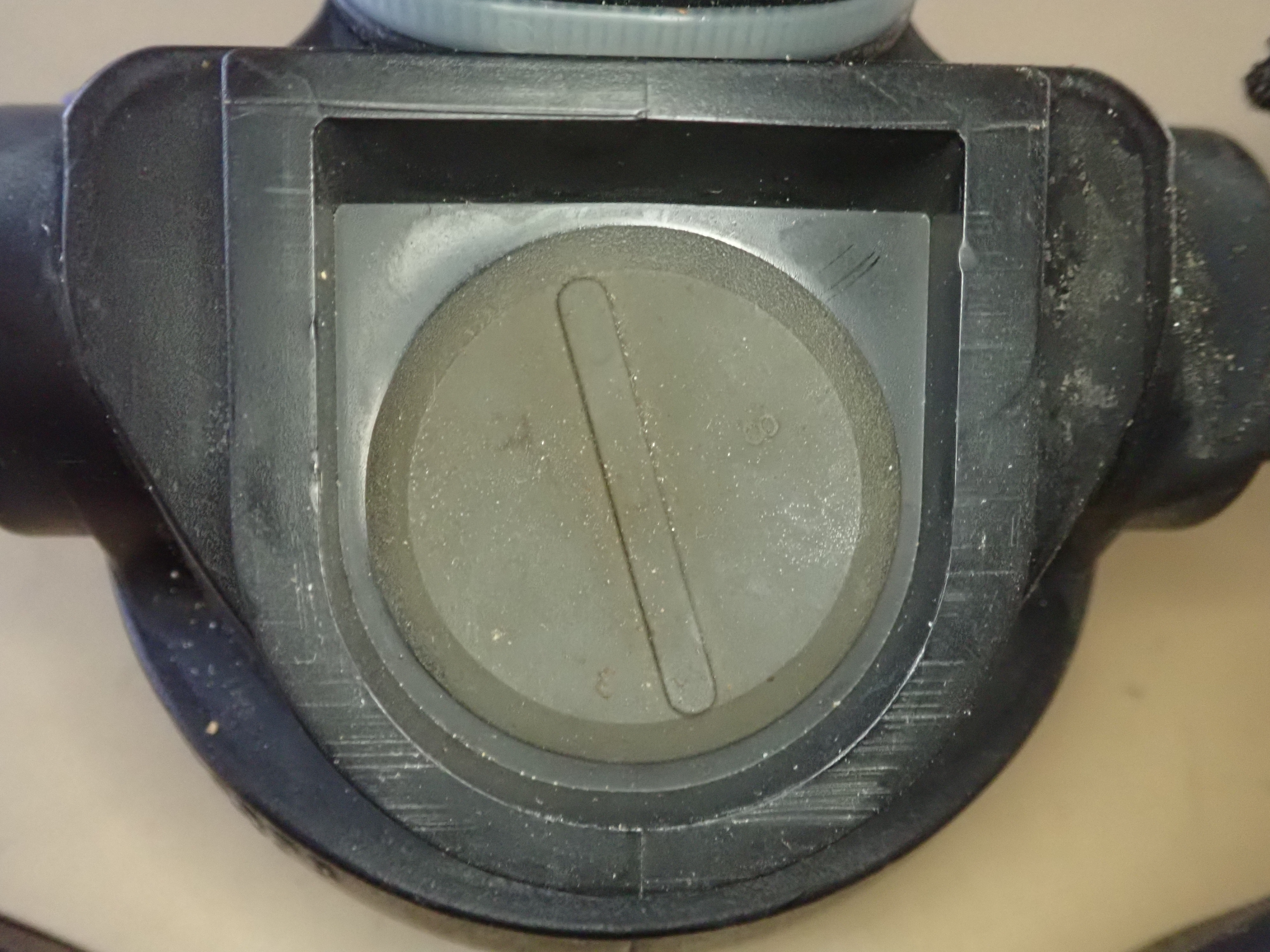
Synthetic elastomer mushroom exhaust valve on demand valve

Exhaust valves are necessary to prevent the diver inhaling water, and to allow a negative pressure difference to be induced over the diaphragm to control the demand valve. The exhaust valves should operate at a very small pressure difference, and cause as little resistance to flow as reasonably possible, without being cumbersome and bulky. Elastomer mushroom valves serve the purpose adequately, though duckbill valves were also common in twin-hose regulators. Where it is important to avoid leaks back into the regulator, such as when diving in contaminated water, a system of two sets of valves in series can reduce the risk of contamination. A more complex option which can be used for surface supplied helmets, is to use a reclaim exhaust system which uses a separate flow regulator to control the exhaust which is returned to the surface in a dedicated hose in the umbilical.

===== Exhaust manifold =====
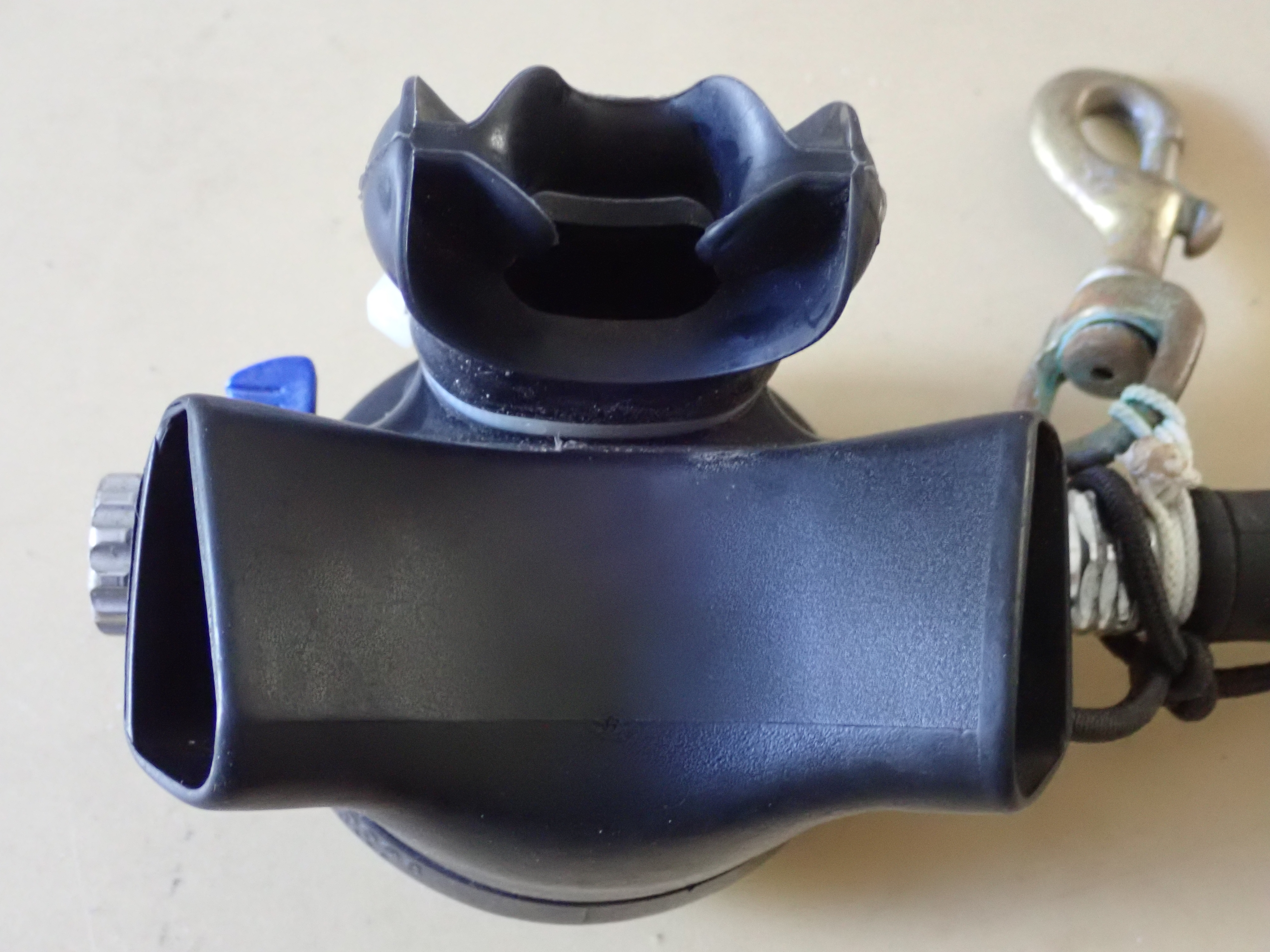
Exhaust ducting on scuba demand valve

The exhaust manifold (exhaust tee, exhaust cover, whiskers) is the ducting that protects the exhaust valve(s) and diverts the exhaled air to the sides so that it does not bubble up in the diver's face and obscure the view. This is not necessary for twin hose regulators as they exhaust air behind the shoulders.

===== Purge button =====
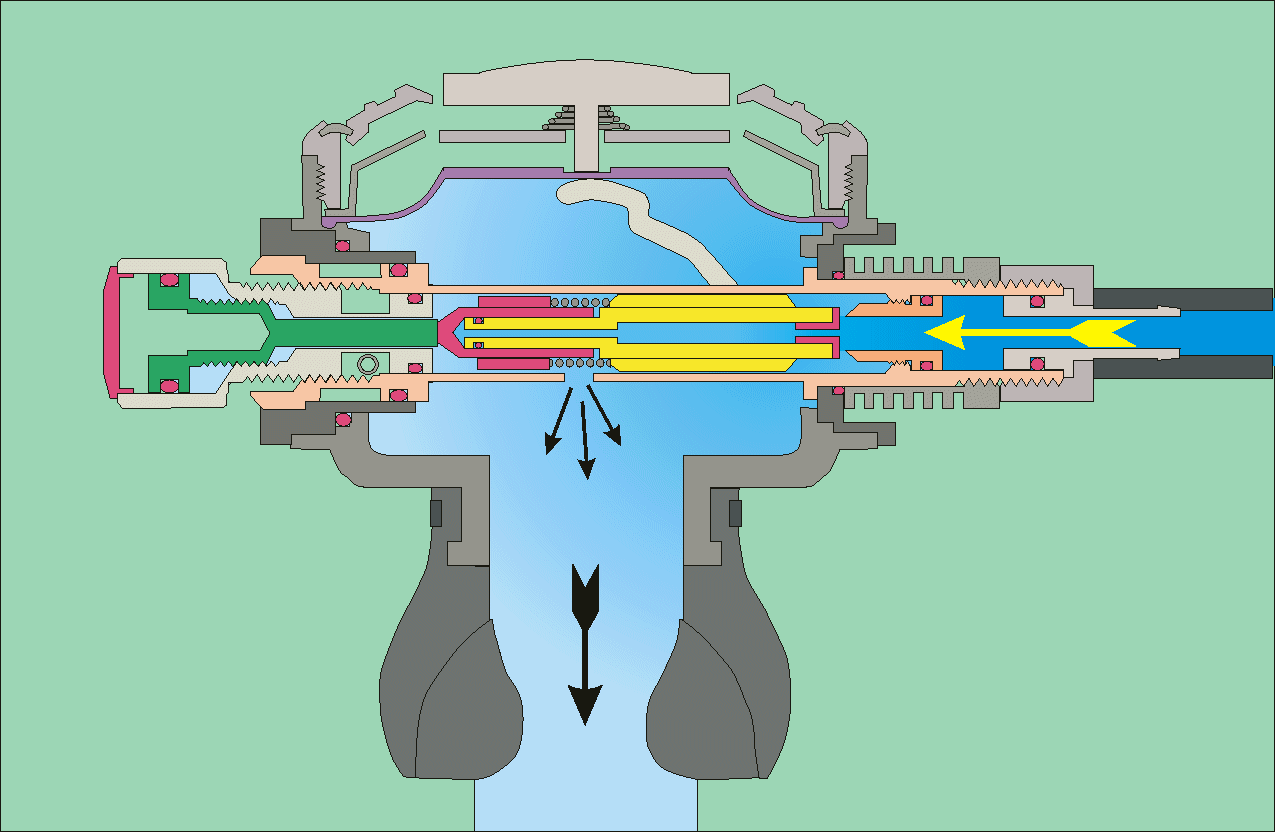
The purge button (top-centre) is depressed. The valve is partially open.

A standard fitting on single-hose second stages, both mouth-held and built into a full-face mask or demand helmet, is the purge-button, which allows the diver to manually deflect the diaphragm to open the valve and cause air to flow into the casing. This is usually used to purge the casing or full-face mask of water if it has flooded. This will often happen if the second stage is dropped or removed from the mouth while under-water. It is either a separate part mounted in the front cover or the cover may be made flexible and serves as the purge button. Depressing the purge button presses against the diapragm directly over the lever of the demand valve, and this movement of the lever opens the valve to release air through the regulator. The tongue may be used to block the mouthpiece during purging to prevent water or other matter in the regulator from being blown into the diver's airway by the air blast. This is particularly important when purging after vomiting through the regulator.

The purge button is also used by recreational divers to inflate a delayed surface marker buoy or lifting bag. Any time that the purge button is operated, the diver must be aware of the potential for a freeflow and be ready to deal with it.

===== User adjustable flow modifiers =====
Animation of demand valve function during the breathing cycle. A cracking pressure adjustment knob can be seen at the left side of the valve mechanism. Screwing it in increases the pre-load on the valve spring and increases the pressure difference required to pull the diaphragm in enough to open the valve.

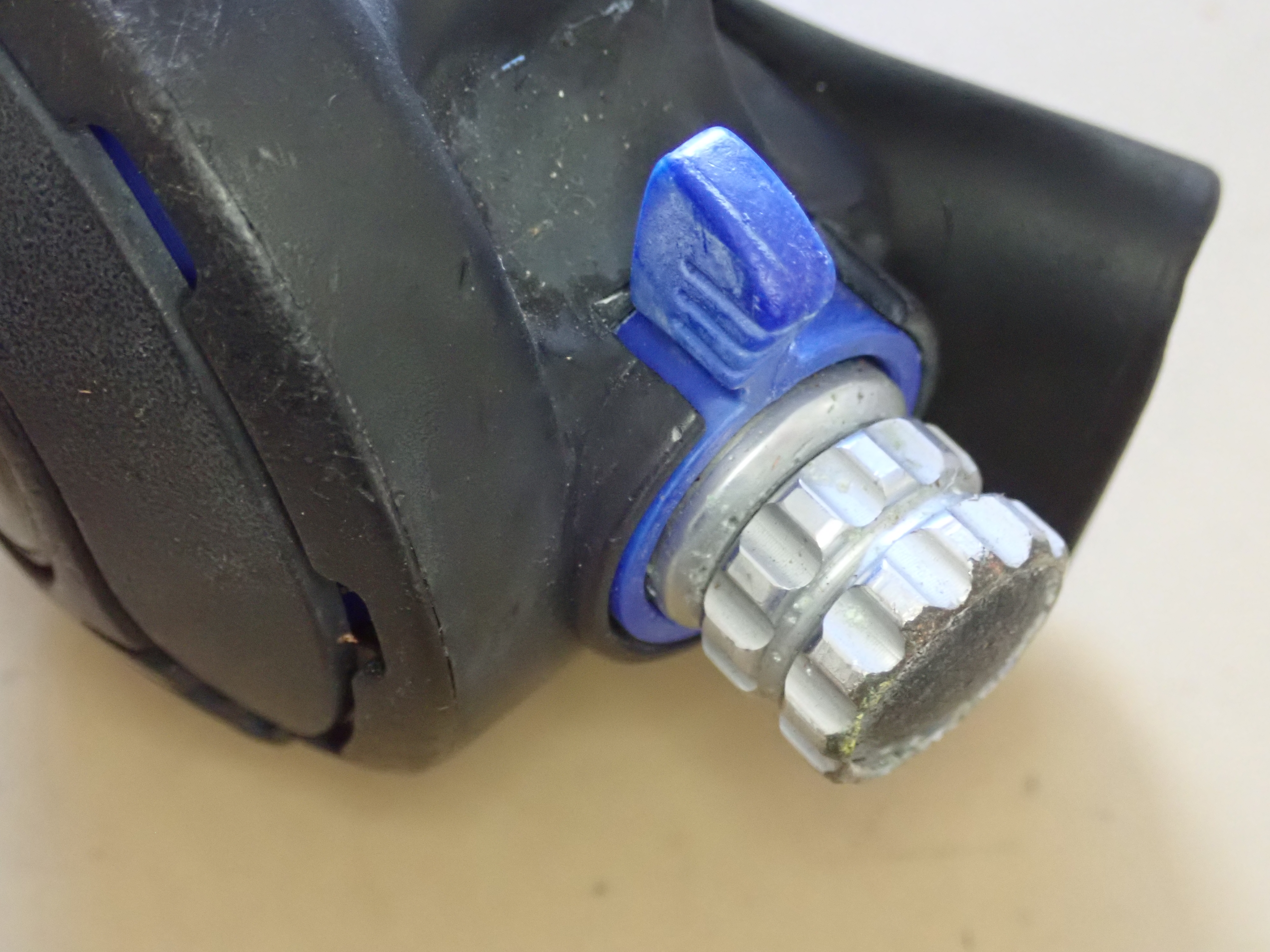
Cracking pressure adjusting knob and flow deflector lever on Apeks TX100 demand valve

It may be desirable for the diver to have some control over the flow characteristics of the demand valve. The usual adjustable aspects are cracking pressure and the feedback from flow rate to internal pressure of the second stage housing. The inter-stage pressure of surface supplied demand breathing apparatus is controlled manually at the control panel, and does not automatically adjust to the ambient pressure in the way that most scuba first stages do, as this feature is controlled by feedback to the first stage from ambient pressure. This has the effect that the cracking pressure of a surface supplied demand valve will vary slightly with depth, so some manufacturers provide a manual adjustment knob on the side of the demand valve housing to adjust spring pressure on the downstream valve, which controls the cracking pressure. The knob is known to commercial divers as "dial-a-breath". A similar adjustment is provided on some high-end scuba demand valves, to allow the user to manually tune the breathing effort at depth

Scuba demand valves which are set to breathe lightly (low cracking pressure, and low work of breathing) may tend to free-flow relatively easily, particularly if the gas flow in the housing has been designed to assist in holding the valve open by reducing the internal pressure. The cracking pressure of a sensitive demand valve is often less than the hydrostatic pressure difference between the inside of an air-filled housing and the water below the diaphragm when the mouthpiece is pointed upwards. To avoid excessive loss of gas due to inadvertent activation of the valve when the DV is out of the diver's mouth, some second stages have a desensitising mechanism which causes some back-pressure in the housing, by impeding the flow or directing it against the inside of the diaphragm.

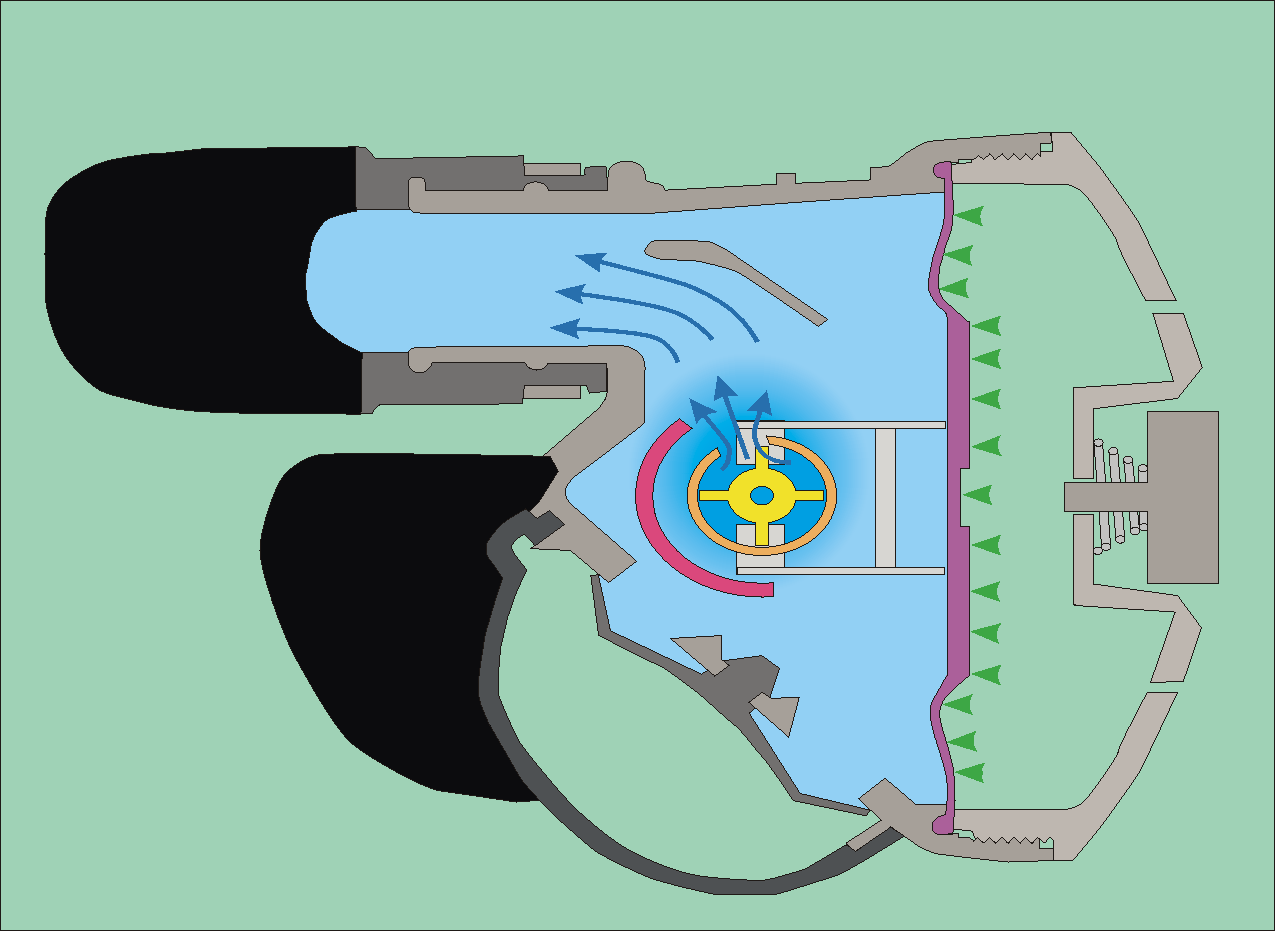
Inhalation flow with venturi assist activated

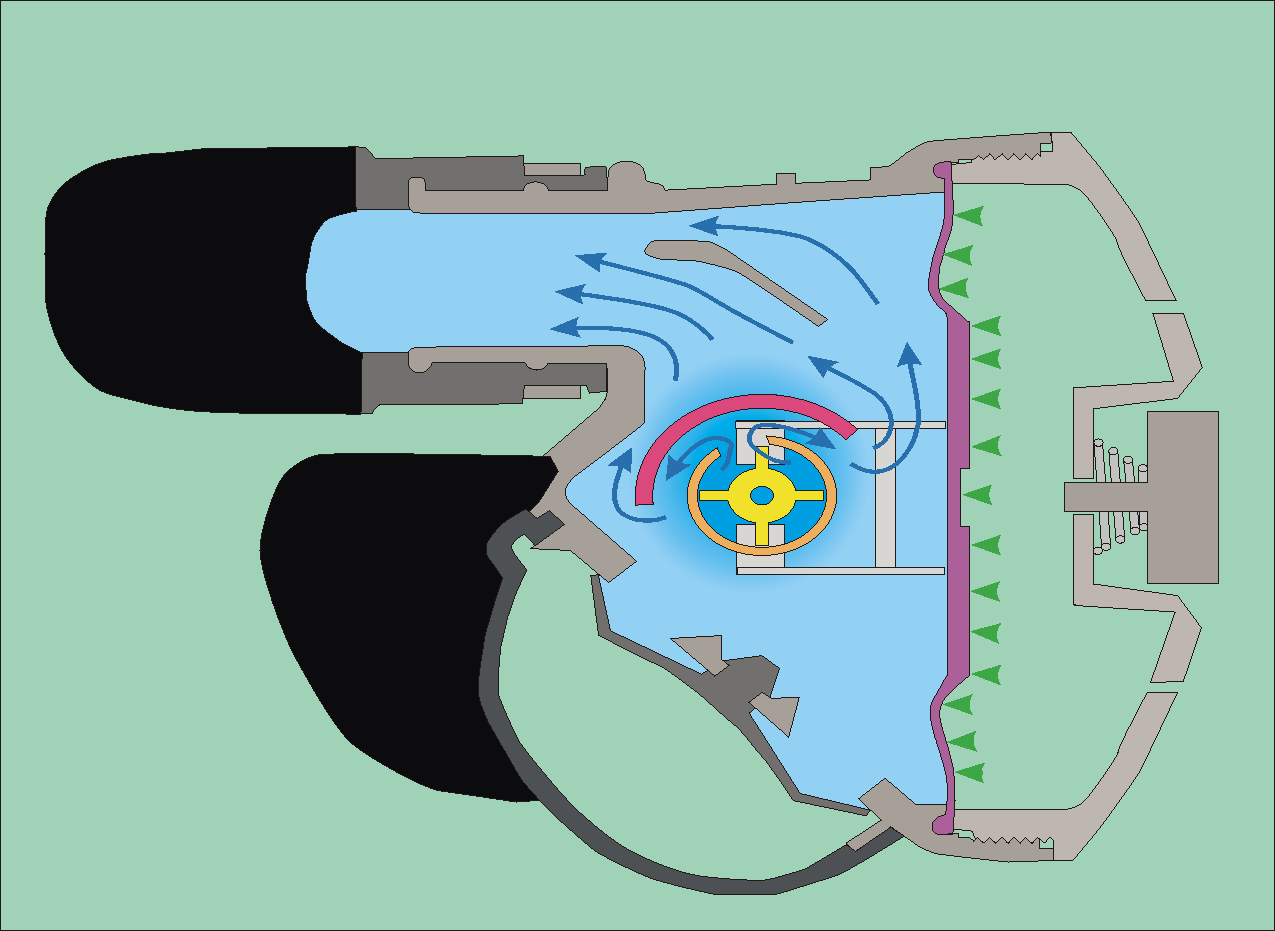
Inhalation flow with venturi assist de-activated

=== Twin-hose demand regulators ===
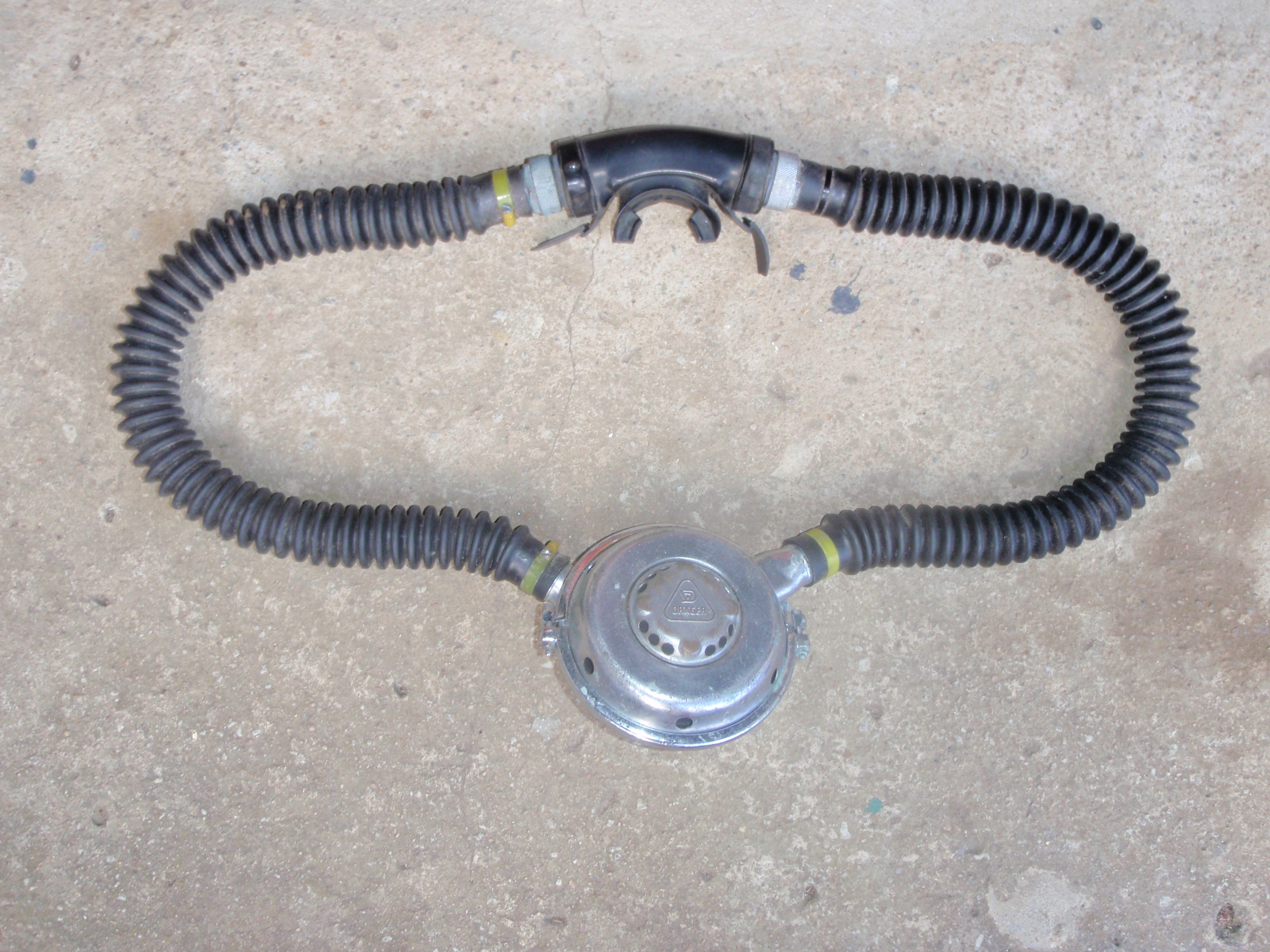
A Dräger two-stage twin-hose regulator

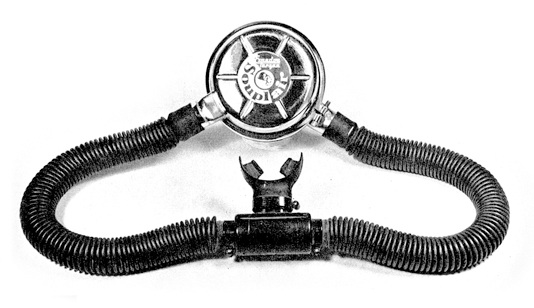
Beuchat "Souplair" single stage twin hose regulator

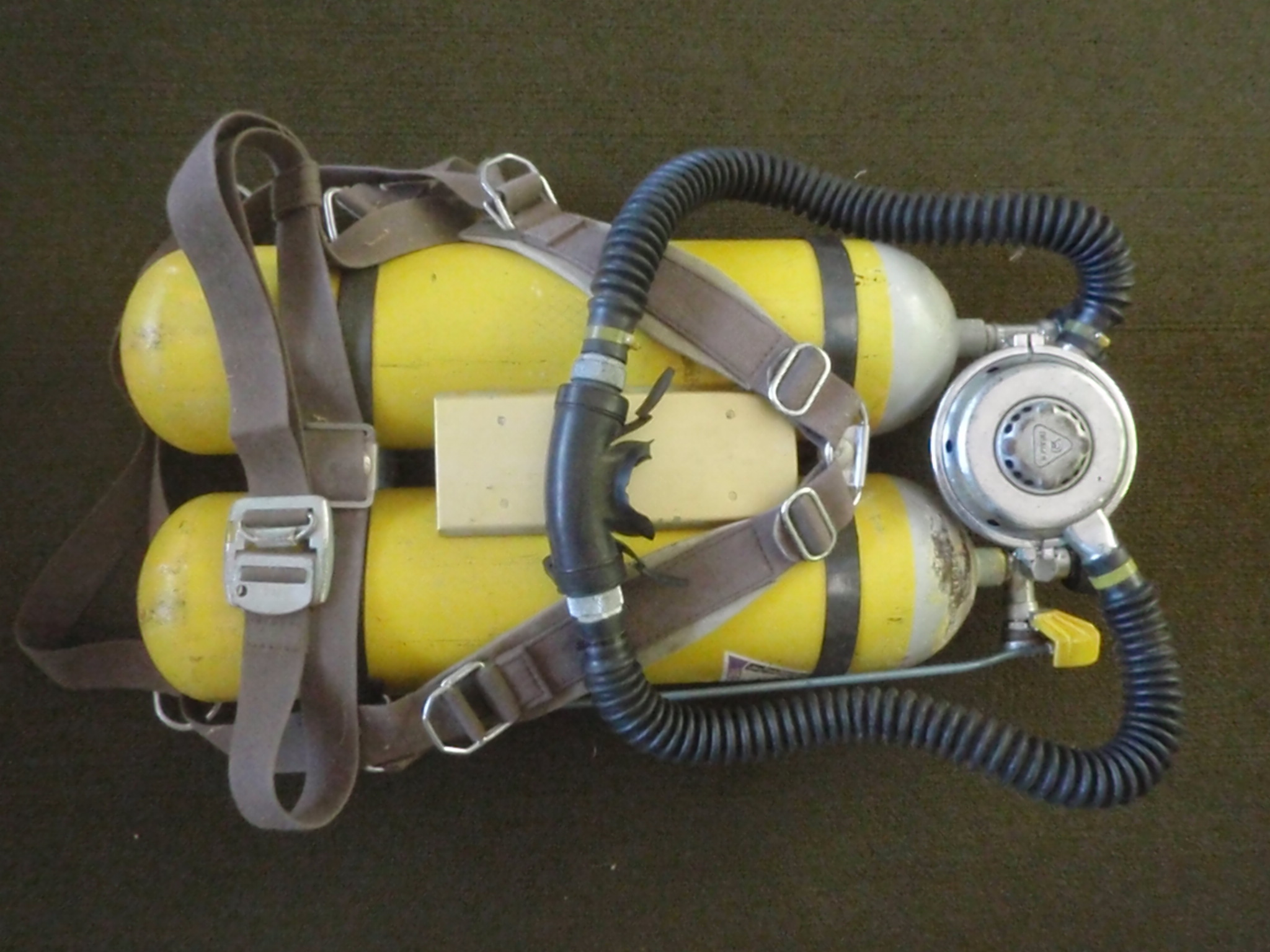
Twin 7l cylinders with Draeger harness, valves, manifold and regulator from c. 1965

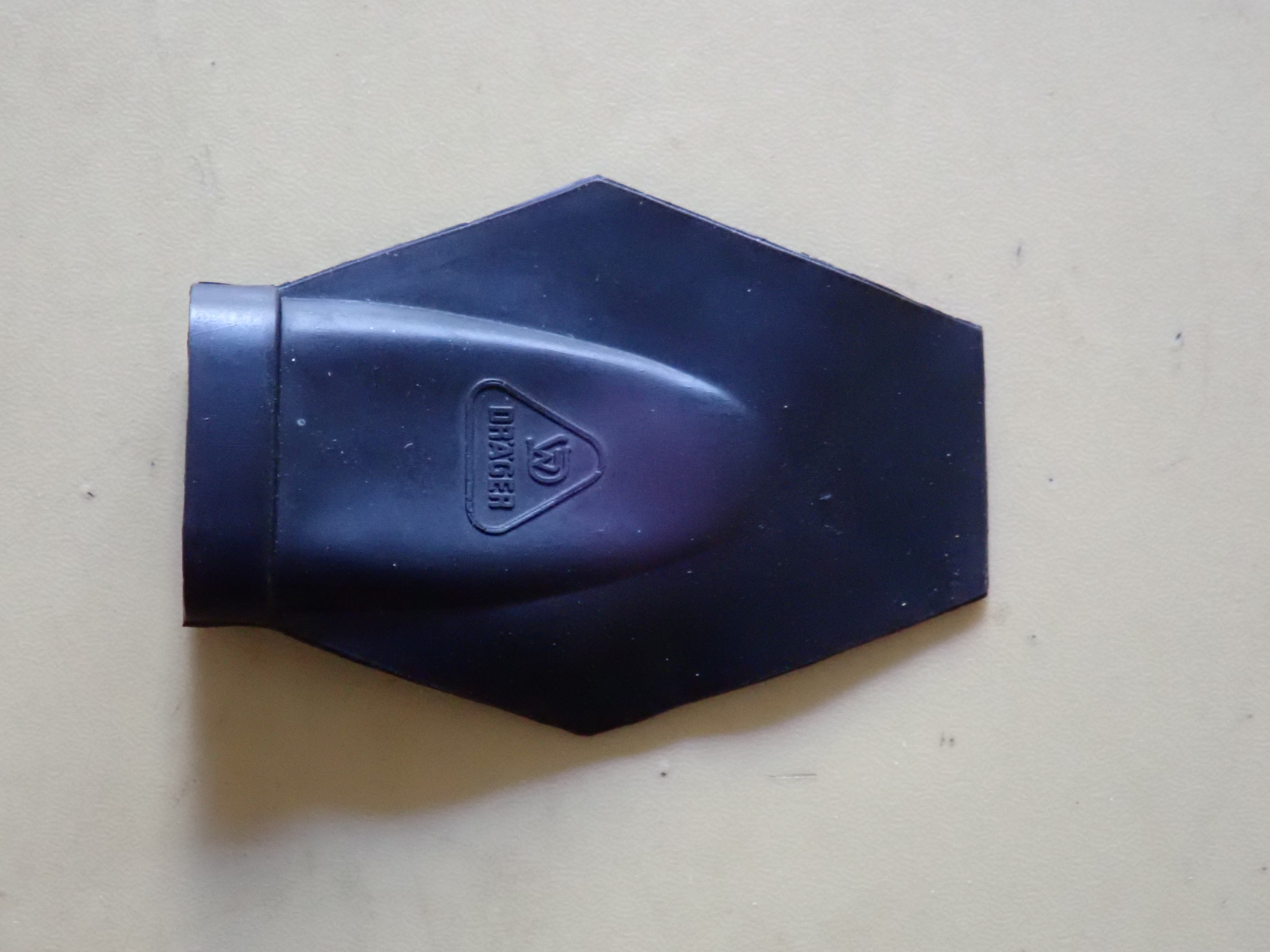
Duckbill exhaust valve for Draeger twin hose regulator

The "twin", "double" or "two" hose configuration of scuba demand valve was the first in general use. This type of regulator has two large bore corrugated breathing tubes. One tube is to supply air from the regulator to the mouthpiece, and the second tube delivers the exhaled gas to a point where the ambient pressure is identical to the demand diaphragm, where it is released through a rubber duck-bill one-way valve, and comes out of the holes in the cover. Advantages of this type of regulator are that the bubbles leave the regulator behind the diver's head, increasing visibility, reducing noise and producing less load on the diver's mouth, They remain popular with some underwater photographers and Aqualung brought out an updated version of the Mistral in 2005.

In Cousteau's original Aqua-Lung prototype, there was no exhaust hose, and the exhaled air exited through a one-way valve at the mouthpiece. It worked out of water, but when he tested the aqualung in the river Marne air free-flowed from the regulator before it could be breathed when the mouthpiece was above the regulator. After that, he had the second breathing tube fitted. Even with both tubes fitted, raising the mouthpiece above the regulator increases the delivered pressure of gas and lowering the mouthpiece reduces delivered pressure and increases breathing resistance. As a result, many aqualung divers, when they were snorkeling on the surface to save air while reaching the dive site, put the loop of hoses under an arm to avoid the mouthpiece floating up causing free flow.

Ideally the delivered pressure is equal to the resting pressure in the diver's lungs as this is what human lungs are adapted to breathe. With a twin hose regulator behind the diver at shoulder level, the delivered pressure changes with diver orientation. if the diver rolls on his or her back the released air pressure is higher than in the lungs. Divers learned to restrict flow by using their tongue to close the mouthpiece. When the cylinder pressure was running low and air demand effort rising, a 90°roll to the side put the lungs and regulator diaphragm at the same depth and made breathing easier. The mouthpiece can be purged by lifting it above the regulator(shallower), which will cause a free flow.

Twin hose regulators have been superseded almost completely by single hose regulators and became obsolete for most diving since the 1980s.

The original twin-hose regulators usually had no ports for accessories, though some had a high pressure port for a submersible pressure gauge. Some later models have one or more low-pressure ports between the stages, which can be used to supply direct feeds for suit or BC inflation and/or a secondary single hose demand valve, and a high pressure port for a submersible pressure gauge. The new Mistral is an exception as it is based on the Aqualung Titan first stage. which has the usual set of ports.

The twin-hose arrangement with a mouthpiece or full-face mask is common in rebreathers, but as part of the breathing loop, not as part of a regulator. The associated demand valve comprising the bail-out valve is a single hose regulator.

The mechanism of the twin hose regulator is packaged in a usually circular metal housing mounted on the cylinder valve behind the diver's neck. The demand valve component of a two-stage twin hose regulator is thus mounted in the same housing as the first stage regulator, and in order to prevent free-flow, the exhaust valve must be located at the same depth as the diaphragm, and the only reliable place to do this is in the same housing. The air flows through a pair of corrugated rubber hoses to and from the mouthpiece. The supply hose is connected to one side of the regulator body and supplies air to the mouthpiece through a non-return valve, and the exhaled air is returned to the regulator housing on the outside of the diaphragm, also through a non-return valve on the other side of the mouthpiece and usually through another non-return exhaust valve in the regulator housing - often a "duckbill" type.

A non-return valve is usually fitted to the breathing hoses where they connect to the mouthpiece. This prevents any water that gets into the mouthpiece from going into the inhalation hose, and ensures that once it is blown into the exhalation hose that it cannot flow back. This slightly increases the flow resistance of air, but makes the regulator easier to clear.

Some early twin hose regulators were of single-stage design. The first stage functions in a way similar to the second stage of two-stage demand valves, but would be connected directly to the cylinder valve and reduced high pressure air from the cylinder directly to ambient pressure on demand. This could be done by using a longer lever and larger diameter diaphragm to control the valve movement, but there was a tendency for cracking pressure, and thus work of breathing, to vary as the cylinder pressure dropped.

== Constant mass flow regulators ==
Constant mass flow semi-closed circuit diving rebreathers need a gas supply that has a constant pressure to feed the sonic orifice. These are generally slightly modified open circuit scuba first stages with the ambient pressure input blanked off. Connection to the high pressure cylinder is the same as for open-circuit scuba, as the cylinders and valves are also for underwater service.

Choked flow is a compressible flow effect associated with the venturi effect. When a flowing gas at a given pressure and temperature passes through a constriction into a lower pressure environment the fluid velocity increases. At initially subsonic upstream conditions, the conservation of mass principle requires the fluid velocity to increase as it flows through the smaller cross-sectional area of the constriction. At the same time, the venturi effect causes the static pressure, and therefore the density, to decrease at the constriction. Choked flow is a limiting condition where the mass flow will not increase with a further decrease in the downstream pressure environment for a fixed upstream pressure and temperature. For homogeneous fluids, the physical point at which the choking occurs for adiabatic conditions, is when the exit plane velocity is at sonic conditions; i.e., at a Mach number of 1. At choked flow, the mass flow rate can be increased only by increasing density upstream and at the choke point.

The choked flow of gases is useful for semi-closed circuit rebreather gas supply because the mass flow rate is independent of the downstream pressure, and depends only on the temperature and pressure and hence the density of the gas on the upstream side of the restriction, and the geometry of the restriction. Under choked conditions, valves and calibrated orifice plates can be used to produce a desired mass flow rate.

== Surface supply regulators ==
Diving helmet with demand regulator showing the cracking pressure adjustment knob (knurled metal cylinder to the lower right of the photo)

The regulators used for providing surface-supplied breathing gases from high pressure storage systems to the gas panel for diving are normal industrial pressure reduction regulators capable of providing the necessary flow rate. Connection to the high-pressure cylinders follows the national practice for industrial high-pressure gas systems for the relevant gases.

Surface-supplied breathing gas may be supplied to a free-flow helmet or a demand supplied helmet, and the gas may be either discharged to the environment at ambient pressure or returned to the surface for recycling if this is economically desirable. Free-flow systems require a relatively high flow rate as the gas is continuously supplied to the helmet, and the diver breathes from it as it passes through. Flow rate must be sufficient to prevent rebreathing of exhaled gas from the dead space of the helmet, and must allow for maximum inspired flow rate at depth. Flow rate of a demand helmet must also allow for maximum inspired flow rate, but this only occurs intermittently during the breathing cycle, and average flow is much less. The regulator must be capable of the same maximum flow rate, but cooling effects are much less for demand service.

The demand valves used on surface-supplied diving helmets and full-face masks work on exactly the same principles as the second stage scuba demand valves of single hose scuba, and in some cases may be the same unit with a different housing compatible with the specific mask or helmet. The demand valves used with surface supplied gas will normally have a supply that is not consistently at the same pressure above ambient pressure, so usually have a cracking pressure adjustment knob, known in the industry as "dial a breath". The breathing gas is delivered from the surface or bell gas panel via a breathing gas supply hose in the diver's umbilical, which commonly uses a JIC-6 or 9/16 UNF fitting at the diver's end of the hose, which is usually 3/8" bore.

A very similar application is the regulation of gas pressure from the on-board emergency gas high-pressure storage cylinders of an open or closed diving bell. The regulator in these cases must be accessible to the bellman, so it is generally mounted at the bell gas panel. In this application the regulator is exposed to the same ambient pressure as the divers in the bell. Pressure from the on-board gas is typically kept just below surface supply pressure, so that it will automatically cut in if the surface supply pressure fails.

== Reclaim regulators ==
Reclaim helmets use a surface supply system to provide breathing gas to the diver in the same way as in the open circuit helmets, but also have a return system to reclaim and recycle the exhaled gas to save the expensive helium diluent, which would otherwise be discharged to the surrounding water and lost in an open circuit system. The reclaimed gas is returned to the surface through a hose in the umbilical which is provided for this purpose, passed through a scrubber to remove carbon dioxide, and can then be repressurised and blended with oxygen to the required mix before storage for later use.

To allow the exhaust gas to be safely discharged from the helmet to a return hose with a lower than ambient pressure, it must pass through an exhaust regulator, known as the reclaim regulator, which works on the principle of a back-pressure regulator, activated by the pressure difference between the interior of the helmet and the ambient pressure. The reclaim regulator may be a two-stage valve for lower resistance, and will generally have a manual bypass valve which allows exhaust to the ambient water if the regulator malfunctions. The helmet will have an emergency flood valve to prevent possible exhaust regulator failure from causing a helmet squeeze or lung barotrauma before the diver can bypass it manually, though the demand valve will usually compensate sufficiently. The flood valve allows water to flow into the helmet if the internal pressure drops below its opening pressure differential. The risk of drowning if the helmet floods is lower than the risk of serious injury caused by a helmet squeeze or lung barotrauma if the reclaim valve sticks open and there is insufficient inlet gas flow to keep up with the exhaust suction. Once the reclaim regulator has been bypassed, the diver will blow down the water in the helmet using the purge valve or the free-flow valve, and thereafter use the helmet on open circuit.

Reclaim gas flow to the topside processing system will generally pass through a back-pressure regulator in the bell, and another at the intake to the processing system. These ensure that the line pressure in the reclaim hose is at approximately 1 bar below ambient at the diver, and 2 bar below diver ambient in the bell umbilical.

== Built-in breathing system regulators ==
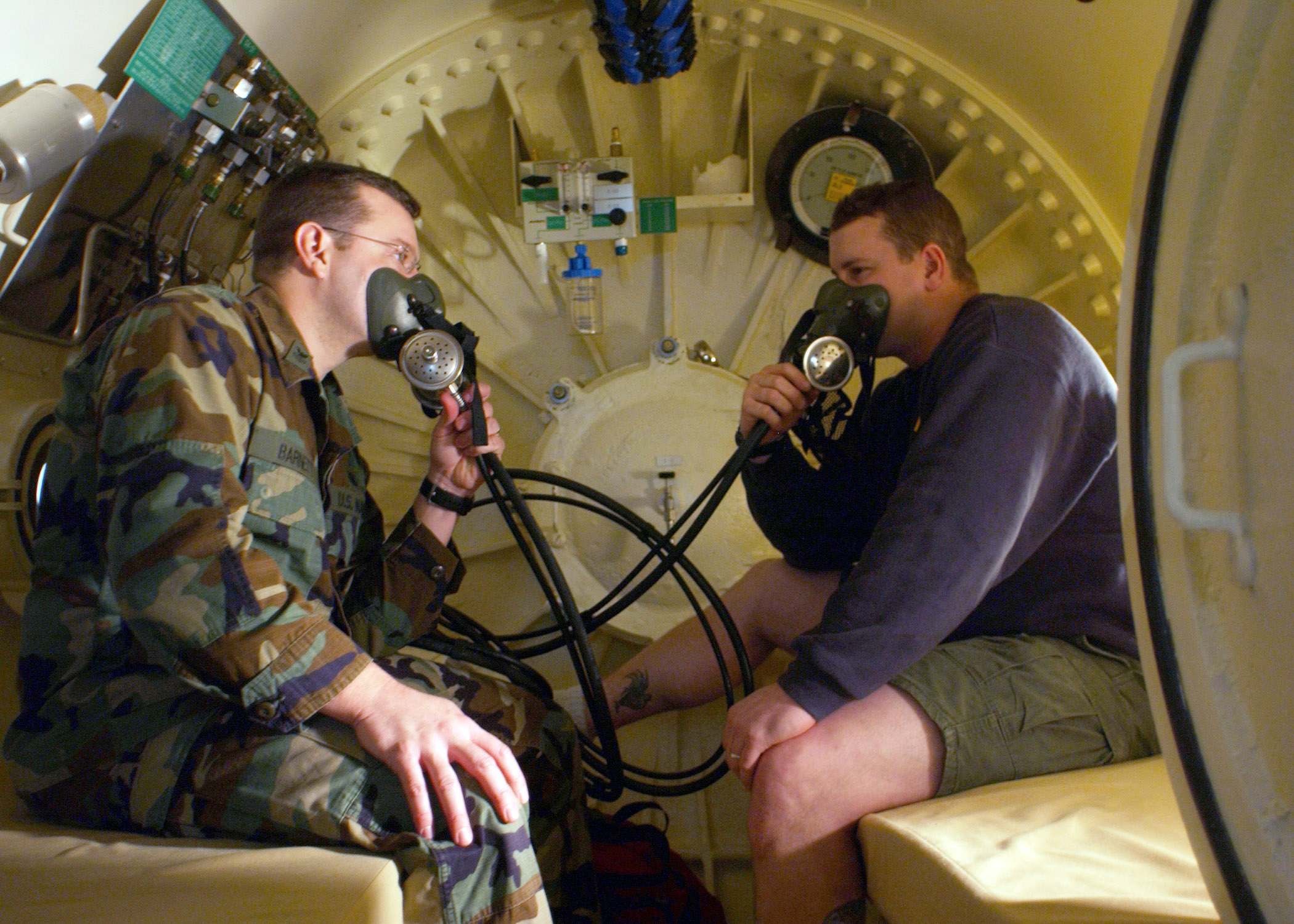
Navy divers testing the built-in breathing masks inside a recompression chamber

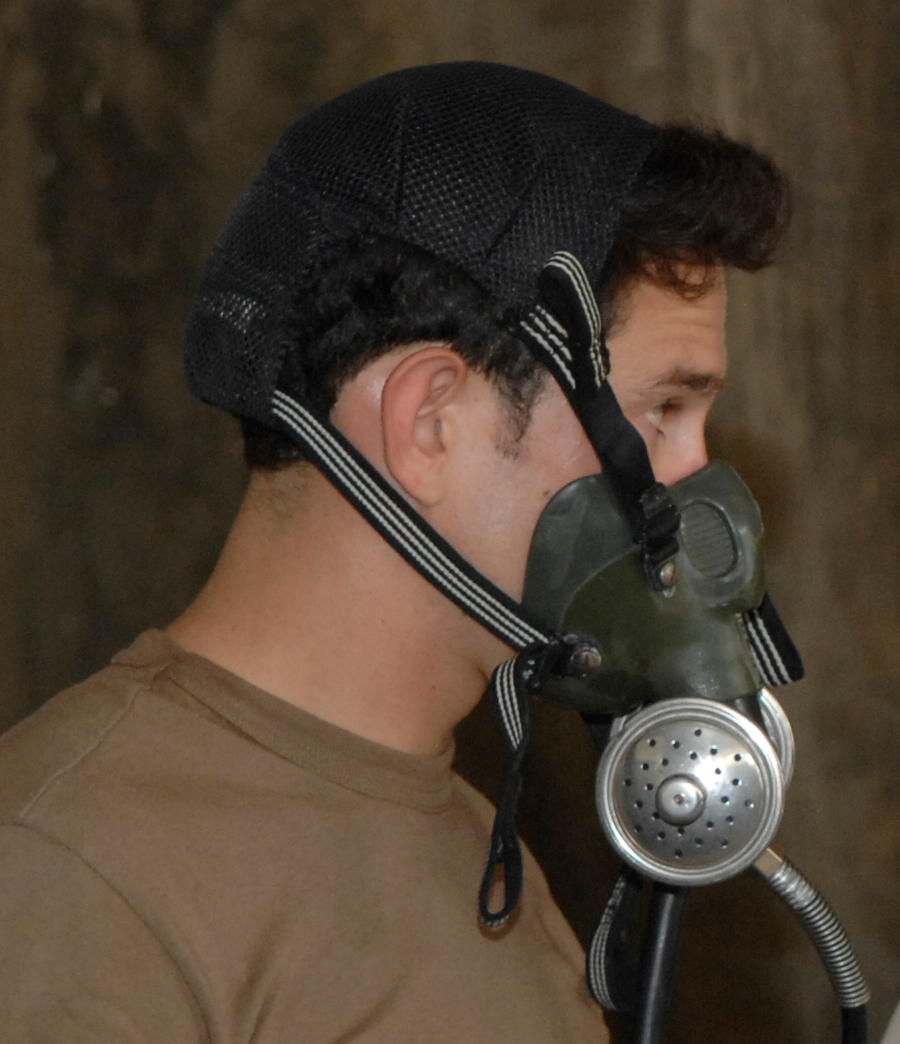
Side view of BIBS mask supported by straps

A built-in breathing system is a source of breathing gas installed in a confined space where an alternative to the ambient gas may be required for medical treatment, emergency use, or to minimise a hazard. They are found in diving chambers, hyperbaric treatment chambers, and submarines.

The use in hyperbaric treatment chambers is usually to supply an oxygen rich treatment gas which if used as the chamber atmosphere, would constitute an unacceptable fire hazard. In this application the exhaust gas is vented outside of the chamber. In saturation diving chambers and surface decompression chamber the application is similar, but a further function is a supply of breathable gas in case of toxic contamination of the chamber atmosphere. This function does not require external venting, but the same equipment is typically used for supply of oxygen enriched gases, so they are generally vented to the exterior.

These are systems used to supply breathing gas on demand in a chamber which is at a pressure greater than the ambient pressure outside the chamber. The pressure difference between chamber and external ambient pressure makes it possible to exhaust the exhaled gas to the external environment, but the flow must be controlled so that only exhaled gas is vented through the system, and it does not drain the contents of the chamber to the outside. This is achieved by using a controlled exhaust valve which opens when a slight over-pressure relative to the chamber pressure on the exhaust diaphragm moves the valve mechanism against a spring. When this over-pressure is dissipated by the gas flowing out through the exhaust hose, the spring returns this valve to the closed position, cutting off further flow, and conserving the chamber atmosphere. A negative or zero pressure difference over the exhaust diaphragm will keep it closed. The exhaust diaphragm is exposed to the chamber pressure on one side, and exhaled gas pressure in the oro-nasal mask on the other side. This is a form of back-pressure regulator. The supply of gas for inhalation is through a demand valve which works on the same principles as a regular diving demand valve second stage. Like any other breathing apparatus, the dead space must be limited to minimise carbon dioxide buildup in the mask.

BIBS regulators for hyperbaric chambers have a two-stage system at the diver similar to reclaim helmets, though for this application the outlet regulator dumps the exhaled gas through an outlet hose to the atmosphere outside the chamber. In some cases the outlet suction must be limited and an additional back-pressure regulator, a device that maintains a specified pressure upstream of itself, may be required. This would usually be the case for use in a saturation system. Use for oxygen therapy and surface decompression on oxygen would not generally need a back-pressure regulator as the chamber pressure is relatively low. When an externally vented BIBS is used at low chamber pressure, a vacuum assist may be necessary to keep the exhalation back-pressure down to provide an acceptable work of breathing.

The major application for this type of BIBS is supply of breathing gas with a different composition to the chamber atmosphere to occupants of a hyperbaric chamber where the chamber atmosphere is controlled, and contamination by the BIBS gas would be a problem. This is common in therapeutic decompression, and hyperbaric oxygen therapy, where a higher partial pressure of oxygen in the chamber would constitute an unacceptable fire hazard, and would require frequent ventilation of the chamber to keep the partial pressure within acceptable limits Frequent ventilation is noisy and expensive, but can be used in an emergency.

== Malfunctions and failure modes ==
There are several ways that a diving regulator can malfunction. This section will generally refer to malfunctions of regulators in the underwater environment, but surface supplied gas regulators can also malfunction. Most regulator malfunctions involve improper supply of breathing gas or water leaking into the gas supply. There are two main gas supply failure modes, where the regulator shuts off delivery, which is extremely rare, and free-flow, where the delivery will not stop and can quickly exhaust a scuba supply.

=== Inlet filter blockage ===
The inlet to the cylinder valve may be protected by a sintered filter, and the inlet to the first stage is usually protected by a filter, both to prevent corrosion products or other contaminants in the cylinder from getting into the fine toleranced gaps in the moving parts of the first and second stage and jamming them, either open or closed. If enough dirt gets into these filters they themselves can be blocked sufficiently to reduce performance, but are unlikely to result in a total or sudden catastrophic failure. Sintered bronze filters can also gradually clog with corrosion products if they get wet with seawater. Inlet filter blockage will become more noticeable as the cylinder pressure drops. These filters are replaceable by a service technician, and are often routinely replaced during annual service.

=== Sticking valves ===
The moving parts in first and second stages have fine tolerances in places, and some designs are more susceptible to contaminants causing friction between the moving parts. This may increase cracking pressure, reduce flow rate, increase work of breathing or induce free-flow, depending on what parts are affected. These problems generally require the regulator to be stripped down and cleaned, usually using a heated pickle solution in an ultrasonic bath, rinsed, dried, lubricated, reassembled and recalibrated.

=== Free-flow ===
Either of the stages may get stuck in the open position, causing a continuous flow of gas from the regulator known as a free-flow. This can be triggered by a range of causes, some of which can be easily remedied, others not. Possible causes include falling into the water or out of the mouth with the mouthpiece up when set on maximum sensitivity, incorrect interstage pressure setting, incorrect second stage valve spring tension, damaged or sticking valve poppet, damaged valve seat, valve freezing, wrong sensitivity setting at the surface and in Poseidon servo-assisted second stages, low interstage pressure. Corrective action may be simply to set the sensitivity down when not actually breathing through it, otherwise it usually includes testing interstage pressure, setting it to the specifications, and adjusting cracking pressure to the specified value. If this fails, it is usually necessary to strip and service the regulator, and replace any worn or damaged parts.

=== Intermediate pressure creep ===
This is a slow leak of the first stage valve. The effect is for the interstage pressure to rise until either the next breath is drawn, or the pressure exerts more force on the second stage valve than can be resisted by the spring, and the valve opens briefly, often with a popping sound, to relieve the pressure. the frequency of the popping pressure relief depends on the flow in the second stage, the back pressure, the second stage spring tension and the magnitude of the leak. It may range from occasional loud pops to a constant hiss. Underwater the second stage may be damped by the water and the loud pops may become an intermittent or constant stream of bubbles. This is not usually a catastrophic failure mode, but should be fixed as it will get worse, and it wastes gas. In upstream valve regulators or regulators with an isolation valve at the second stage, such as the bailout valve on a surface supplied helmet or full-face mask, this relief valve function of the second stage may not be available, and a pressure relief valve on the first stage is necessary to prevent the pressure in the hose rising until it bursts. Causes of such leakage include a poor O-ring seal between the valve seat and regulator body, or between the valve stem and the regulator body, which is easily fixed by replacing the O-ring, dirt on the sealing surface between valve crown and seat, damage or excessive wear to the sealing surface of the seat, and cracks in the body of the seat. The seat is usually a hard plastic, and is usually replaceable, The valve crown may be an integral part of the valve body or a replaceable part, usually metal.

=== Regulator freezing ===
Regulator freezing is a malfunction of a diving regulator where ice formation on or in one or both stages causes the regulator to function incorrectly. Several types of malfunction are possible, including jamming of the first or second stage valves in any position from closed, to more frequently, fully open, which can produce a free-flow capable of emptying the diving cylinder in minutes, ice formation in the exhaust valve opening causing leakage of water into the mouthpiece, and shedding of ice shards into the inhalation air, which may be inhaled by the diver, possibly causing laryngospasm.

When air expands during pressure reduction in a regulator, the temperature drops and heat is absorbed from the surroundings. It is well known that in waters colder than 10 °C (50 °F) use of a regulator to inflate a lift bag, or to purge a regulator underwater for just a few seconds, will start many regulators free-flowing and they will not stop until the air supply to the regulator is stopped. Some cold water scuba divers install shuttle (slide operation) type shut off valves at each second stage regulator so if the second stage freezes open, the low pressure air can be shut off to the frozen second stage allowing them to switch to the alternative second stage and abort the dive.

The most familiar effect of regulator freezing is where the second stage demand valve starts free flowing due to ice formation around the inlet valve mechanism that prevents the valve from closing after inhalation. Besides the problem of free flow from second stage icing, a less known problem is free ice formation, where ice forms and builds up inside the second stage but does not cause the regulator to free flow, and the diver may not be aware that the ice is there. This free ice build-up inside the second stage can break loose in the form of a sliver or chunk and pose a significant choking hazard because the ice can be inhaled. This can be a particular problem with regulators having ice-shedding internal surfaces that are teflon coated, which allows the ice to break free of the internal surfaces and helps to prevent the regulator from free flowing by clearing the ice. This may be helpful in keeping the demand valve mechanism free to move, but the ice still forms in the regulator and has to go somewhere when it breaks loose. If inhaled, a piece of ice can cause laryngospasm or a serious coughing spell.

With most second stage scuba regulators, ice forms and builds up on internal components such as the valve actuating lever, valve housing tube, and the inlet valve poppet, the gap between the lever and fulcrum point is reduced and eventually filled by the build-up of ice that forms, preventing the inlet from fully closing during exhalation Once the valve starts leaking, the second stage components get even colder due to the cooling effect of the continuous flow, creating more ice and an even greater free flow. With some regulators the refrigerating effect is so great, that water around the exhaust valve freezes, reducing exhaust flow, and increasing exhalation effort and producing positive pressure in the valve body, making it difficult to exhale through the regulator. This may cause the diver to loosen their grip on the mouthpiece and exhale around the mouthpiece.

With some regulators, once the regulator starts free-flowing the flow escalates into a full free-flow, and delivers air to the diver at temperatures cold enough to freeze mouth tissue in a short time. The effect increases with depth, and the deeper the diver is, the faster the breathing gas will be lost. In some cold water fatalities, by the time the diver's body is recovered there is no gas left in the cylinder, and the regulator has warmed up and melted the ice, destroying the evidence, leading to a finding of death by drowning due to running out of gas, but without the initial cause of regulator malfunction.

==== Mechanism of icing ====
When the high pressure gas passes through the regulator first stage, the pressure drop from cylinder pressure to inter-stage pressure causes a temperature drop as the gas expands. The higher the cylinder pressure the greater the drop in pressure and the colder the gas gets in the low pressure hose to the second stage. An increase in flow will increase the amount of heat lost and the gas will get colder, as heat transfer from the surrounding water is limited. If the breathing rate is low to moderate (15 to 30 lpm) the risk of ice formation is less.

The factors that influence ice formation are:

- Cylinder pressure: - The temperature drop is proportional to the pressure drop. See general gas equation. The risk is greater for high-pressure cylinders when full.
- Breathing or volumetric flow rate: - The heat loss is proportional to the mass flow of gas, which depends on pressure and volumetric flow.
- Depth: - Mass flow is proportional to downstream pressure for a given volumetric flow.
- Water temperature: - Rewarming of the expanded gas and the regulator mechanism depends on water temperature, and the temperature difference between the gas and the water.
- Duration of flow:- During high flow rates heat loss is faster than rewarming, and gas temperature will drop.
- Regulator design and materials: - The materials, arrangement of parts, and gas flow in the regulator affect reheating and deposition of ice. The thermal conductivity of the regulator components will affect the rate of heat transfer.
- Breathing gas composition: - The amount of heat needed to raise the temperature depends on the specific heat capacity of the gas.

If the cylinder pressure is 2,500 pounds per square inch (170 bar) or more, and the flow is great enough, (50 to 62.5 lpm), ice will often form inside most second stage demand regulators, even in water of 7.2 to 10 °C (45.0 to 50.0 °F) Once the water temperature drops below 4.4 °C (39.9 °F) the possibility of developing ice in the second stage becomes a significant risk, and should be considered before starting heavy exercise, filling a BC, or any other activity that requires a substantial flow of air. In 7.2 to 10 °C (45.0 to 50.0 °F) water, most regulators will ice up if the diver aggressively purges the demand regulator for just 5 to 10 seconds to fill a small lift bag. For this reason an important rule in cold water diving is never to intentionally free flow the regulator.

Once the water temperature drops below 3.3 °C (37.9 °F) there is not enough heat in the water to rewarm the components of the second stage being chilled by the cold gas from the first stage, and most second stages start forming ice.

The cold inter-stage air enters the second stage and is reduced to ambient pressure, which cools it further, so it chills the second stage inlet valve components to well below freezing and as the diver exhales, the moisture in the exhaled breath condenses on the cold components and freezes. Heat from the surrounding water may keep the second stage regulator components warm enough to prevent the build-up of ice. The diver's exhaled breath at 29 to 32 °C (84 to 90 °F), does not have enough heat to compensate for the cooling effect of the expanding incoming air once the water temperature is much below 4 °C (39 °F), and once the water temperature drops below 4 °C (39 °F) there is not enough heat in the water to rewarm the regulator components fast enough to keep moisture in the divers exhaled breath from freezing if the diver is breathing hard. This is why the CE cold water limit is at 4 °C (39 °F) which is the point at which many scuba regulators start retaining free ice.

The longer the gas expands at a high rate, the more cold gas is produced, and for a given rate of reheating, the colder the regulator components will get. Keeping high flow rates to as short a time as possible will minimise ice formation.

==== First stage freezing ====
Air from the diving cylinder is subjected to a dramatic reduction in pressure - as much as 220 bar (3,200 psi) from a full 230 bar (3,300 psi), and 290 bar (4,200 psi) from a full 300 bar (4,400 psi) cylinder at the surface - when passing through the regulator first stage. This lowers the temperature of the air, and heat is absorbed from the components of the regulator. As these components are largely metal and therefore good conductors of heat energy, the regulator body will cool quickly to a temperature lower than the surrounding medium. The gas coming out of the first stage will always be colder than the water once the gas in the cylinder has reached water temperature, so when immersed in water during a dive, the water surrounding the regulator is cooled and, if this water is already very cold, it can freeze.

Two things can cause first stage freezing. The less common is internal freezing due to excessive moisture in the gas. Most high pressure breathing air compressor filter systems provide air with a dew point down below −40 °C (−40 °F). Internal first stage freezing can happen if the moisture content is higher than dew point because the filling compressor separators and filter media are not maintained properly.

The more common cause of first stage freezing is external freezing of the surrounding water around the outside of the first stage. This can happen in water that is below 4.4 °C (39.9 °F) if flow rates and cylinder supply pressures are high. Colder water and high flow rates will increase the risk of first stage icing. The most effective first stage designs for cold water have a large surface area and good thermal conductivity to allow faster heat transfer from the surrounding water. As ice forms and thickens on the exterior of the first stage, it further reduces thermal transfer as ice is a poor conductor of heat, and in water of 1.6 °C (34.9 °F) or colder, there may not be enough heat to melt ice on the first stage faster than it forms for a flow rate of 40 lpm or more. A thick layer of ice will take some time to melt even after gas flow has stopped, even if the first stage is left in the water. First stage freezing can be a greater problem in fresh water because fresh water ice is harder to melt than seawater ice.

If the water in direct contact with the pressure transfer mechanism (diaphragm or piston and the spring balancing the internal pressure), or over the sensing ports of a piston first stage of the regulator freezes, the ambient pressure feedback is lost and the mechanism will be locked in the position at which the freezing takes place, which could be anywhere between closed and fully open, as the ice will prevent the movement required to control the downstream pressure. Since the cooling takes place during flow through the regulator, it is common for the freezing to occur when the first stage valve is open, and this will freeze the valve open, allowing a continuous flow through the first stage. This will cause the inter-stage pressure to rise until the second stage opens to relieve the excess pressure and the regulator will free-flow at a fairly constant rate, which could be a massive free-flow or insufficient to provide breathing gas to meet the demand. If the second stage is shut off the pressure relief valve on the first stage will open, or a low pressure hose or fitting will burst. All of these effects will allow the flow through the first stage to continue, so the cooling will continue, and this will keep the ice causing the problem frozen. To break the cycle it is necessary to stop the gas flow at the inlet or expose the ice to a heat source capable of melting it. While underwater, it is unlikely to find a heat source to thaw the ice and stopping the flow is only option. Clearly the flow will stop when the pressure in the cylinder drops to ambient, but this is undesirable as it means total loss of the breathing gas. The other option is to close the cylinder valve, shutting off the pressure at the source. Once this is done, the ice will normally melt as heat from the surrounding water is absorbed by the slightly colder ice, and once the ice has melted, the regulator will function again.

This freezing can be avoided by preventing water from coming into direct contact with cooled moving parts of the regulator mechanism, or by increasing the heat flow from the surrounding environment so that freezing does not occur. Both strategies are used in regulator design.

Scuba regulators with layers of plastic on the outside are unsuitable for cold water use. Insulating the first or second stage inhibits rewarming from the surrounding water and accelerates freezing.

Environmental isolation kits on most first stages can help to some degree, at least for the duration of current CE breathing simulator tests. Freezing of a first stage usually takes longer than freezing of a second stage. Most first stages can deliver 62.5 lpm for at least five minutes in 1.6 °C (34.9 °F) as deep as 57 msw (190 fsw) without freezing, but if the second stage starts a high rate free-flow, the first stage will generally ice over rapidly and lose ambient pressure feedback.

First stage regulators submerged in water at the same temperature, using the same supply pressure, inter-stage pressure, and flow rate will produce the same discharge gas temperature, within 1 or 2 degrees, depending on conductivity of the valve body.

==== Interstage gas temperature ====
With each inhalation there is a sudden pressure drop from cylinder pressure of typically between 230 and 50 bar, to inter-stage pressure of typically about 8 bar above ambient pressure. If the water temperature is around 0 to 2 °C (32 to 36 °F) and breathing rate is high at 62.5 lpm, the inter-stage temperature will be around −27 to −28 °C (−17 to −18 °F), well below the freezing point of water. By the time the air has passed through a standard 700 to 800 millimetres (28 to 31 in) long hose to the second stage, the air will have only warmed up to about −11 °C (12 °F), which is still below freezing. There will be a lesser further cooling during expansion through the second stage.

The air and chilled components of the second stage will be cold enough to freeze moisture in the exhaled air which can build up a layer of ice on the inside of the second stage. Higher cylinder pressures will produce colder air during first stage expansion. A three to five second purge from a 200 bar cylinder in 0 to 2 °C (32 to 36 °F) water can cause a temperature of below −31 °C (−24 °F) at the first stage, and −20 °C (−4 °F) at the inlet to the second stage.

In waters of 10 °C (50 °F) or colder, a cylinder pressure of 170 bars (2,500 psi) and breathing at a rate of 50 lpm) or greater, the temperature of the air entering the second stage can be well below freezing, and the higher the cylinder pressure, the colder the air will get. In water colder than 4.4 °C (39.9 °F), the possibility of ice formation and build-up in the second stage increases considerably, particularly if the breathing rate exceeds 50 lpm. A free flow caused by freezing will often increase in intensity until the regulator is dumping a large amount of air, raising the exhalation effort, and making it very difficult to breathe. Air mass flow increases with depth and exertion, and the temperatures decrease accordingly. A longer inter-stage hose will allow slightly more reheating of the inter-stage gas before it reaches the second stage valve, though the reheating is not quite proportional to hose length, and the hose material is not a particularly good conductor of heat.

The air temperature above the ice may be considerably colder than the water under the ice, and the specific heat of air is much less than that of water. As a consequence, there is less warming of the regulator body and inter-stage gas when out of the water, and it is possible for further cooling to occur. This increases the risk of second stage icing, and the gas in the cylinder may be cooled sufficiently for condensation of residual moisture to occur during first stage expansion, as the expanding gas may cool below the −50 °C (−58 °F) dew point specified for high pressure breathing gas, which could cause internal icing of the first stage. This can be avoided by restricting breathing from the set in the cold air to a minimum.

==== Second stage freeze ====
A similar effect occurs with the second stage. Air which has already expanded and cooled through the first stage expands again and cools further at the demand valve of the second stage. This cools the components of the second stage and water in contact with them may freeze. Metal components around the moving parts of the valve mechanism allow heat transfer from the surrounding slightly warmer water, and from exhaled air from the diver, which is considerably warmer than the surroundings.

Second stage freezing can develop quickly from the moisture in the exhaled breath, so regulators that prevent or reduce contact of the diver's exhaled breath with the colder components and the area where the cold gas enters will usually build up less ice on critical components. The heat transfer qualities of the materials can also significantly influence ice formation and freezing risk. Regulators with exhaust valves that do not seal well will form ice quickly as ambient water leaks into the casing. All second stages can develop ice when the inlet gas temperature averages below −4 °C (25 °F) and this can happen in water temperatures up to 10 °C (50 °F). The ice that forms may or may not cause a free flow, but any ice inside the regulator casing may present an inhalation hazard.

A second stage freeze is also likely to happen with the valve open, causing a free flow, which may precipitate a first stage freeze if not immediately stopped. If the flow through the frozen second stage can be stopped before the first stage freezes, the process can be halted. This may be possible if the second stage is fitted with a shutoff valve, but if this is done, the first stage must be fitted with an over-pressure valve, as closing the supply to the second stage disables its secondary function as an over-pressure valve.

Metal and plastic second stages get equally cold, but they differ in how fast they cool down. Metal casings conduct heat faster so will get cold quicker, but will also warm up quicker than plastic mouldings, and plastic components may insulate metal components inside, reducing the rate of reheating by the water. Metal components can be more of a problem out of the water in very cold air, as they will draw heat from any body part they contact faster than plastic or rubber.

==== Surface supplied breathing equipment ====
In most cases surface supplied helmets and full face mask demand valves do not get cold enough to develop ice because the umbilical works as a heat exchanger and warms the air up to the water temperature. If the surface supplied diver bails out to scuba emergency gas supply, then the problems are identical to those for scuba, though the metal gas block and bent tube gas passages before the second stage will provide some warming of inter-stage gas beyond what a scuba set would normally provide.

When scuba diving in water between 7 and 10 °C (45 and 50 °F) the air arriving at the second stage can easily be in the −20 to −10 °C (−4 to 14 °F) range, whereas the surface supplied air will be at nearly the same temperature as the water, which in the worst case would be just below freezing but still warm enough for the divers exhaled breath to keep ice from forming. If the surface air temperatures are well below freezing, (below −4 °C (25 °F)) excessive moisture from the volume tank can freeze into ice granules which can then travel down the umbilical and end up in the helmet intake, blocking off air to the demand valve, either as a reduction in flow or a complete blockage if the granules accumulate and form a plug. Ice formation in a surface supplied system can be prevented by use of an effective moisture separation system and regular draining of condensate. Desiccating filters can also be used. Use of HP gas for surface supply is not generally a problem as the HP compressors use a filter system that dries the air sufficiently to keep the dew point below −40 °C (−40 °F). Keeping the surface section of the umbilical exposed to the cold air as short as possible will also help. The portion in the water is not normally cold enough to be a problem.

==== Factors increasing the risk of regulator freeze ====
- Unsuitable regulator design and construction: Any design feature that reduces heat transfer between the regulator and surrounding water, such as plastic trim, can increase the risk of freezing. Regulators that are suitable and have been tested for cold water use will mention this in the specifications.
- High flow rates through the regulator. This can be caused by:
  - Accidental free-flow when the second stage is dropped. This is most likely when the mouthpiece faces upwards, and can cause a freeze in relatively warm water, particularly at the surface if the first stage is out of the water.
  - Purging can cause extremely high flow rates.
  - Buddy breathing provides the gas for two divers through the same first and second stages.
  - Octo breathing provides the gas for two divers through the same first stage, and is more likely to cause first stage freezing.
  - Filling a lift bag or DSMB from the breathing regulator.
  - long bursts of dry suit inflation or BC inflation while breathing from the same regulator.
  - High breathing rate due to exertion.
- Low water temperature: Water directly under the ice is likely to be colder than deeper water in fresh water.
- Breathing through the regulator above the ice in sub-freezing temperatures, where there is no rewarming of the gas in the interstage hose by relatively warm ambient water.

==== Precautions to reduce risk of regulator freezing ====
- Keeping the interior of the second-stage completely dry before entering the water

- Not breathing from the regulator until underwater. When testing the regulator before the dive, inhale only, avoid exhaling through the regulator as the moisture in the breath will freeze in the demand valve.

- Preventing water from entering the second-stage chamber during or between dives
- Depressing the purge button for no more than 5 seconds prior to or during the dive, and avoiding even this if possible
- Avoiding heavy work loads that would significantly increase the breathing rate and volume of air moved through the valve with each breathing cycle
- Ensuring that the scuba air is moisture-free
- Keeping the regulator in warm surroundings prior to the dive, if possible.

==== Mitigation ====
Kirby Morgan have developed a stainless steel tube heat exchanger ("Thermo Exchanger") to warm the gas from the first stage regulator to reduce the risk of second stage scuba regulator freeze when diving in extremely cold water at temperatures down to −2.2 °C (28.0 °F). The length and relatively good thermal conductivity of the tubing, and the thermal mass of the block allows sufficient heat from the water to warm the air to within one to two degrees of the surrounding water.

==== Procedures for managing a regulator freeze ====
- The diver will close the cylinder valve supplying the frozen regulator and change over to breathing from the standby regulator. This conserves the gas and allows the frozen regulator time to defrost.
- If tethered, the diver can signal to the line tender with the previously agreed emergency signal (usually five or more tugs on the rope) while breathing from free-flowing regulator (less desirable option used if no alternative gas supply is available). Five pulls will usually indicate that the surface tender should pull the diver to the surface, or in this case, the hole in the ice.
- If diving without a tether the diver should follow the guideline back to the hole and avoid leaving the line unless able to use a jump line or can see the ice hole.
- Emergency ascent if directly under the hole in the ice and in visible range. (least desirable option short of drowning)

Protocol for a regulator freeze often includes aborting the dive.

=== Gas leaks ===
Gas leaks can be caused by burst or leaky hoses, defective o-rings, blown o-rings, particularly in yoke connectors, loose connections, and several of the previously listed malfunctions. Low pressure inflation hoses may fail to connect properly, or the non-return valve may leak. A burst low pressure hose will usually lose gas faster than a burst high pressure hose, as HP hoses usually have a flow restriction orifice in the fitting that screws into the port, as the submersible pressure gauge does not need high flow, and a slower pressure increase in the gauge hose is less likely to overload the gauge, while the hose to a second stage must provide high peak flow rate to minimize work of breathing. A relatively common o-ring failure occurs when the yoke clamp seal extrudes due to insufficient clamp force or elastic deformation of the clamp by impact with the environment. This can cause anything from a mild to a catastrophic leak, and it can get worse with time.

=== Wet breathing ===
Wet breathing is caused by water getting into the regulator and compromising breathing comfort and safety. Water can leak into the second stage body through damaged soft parts like torn mouthpieces, damaged exhaust valves and perforated diaphragms, through cracked housings, or through poorly sealing or fouled exhaust valves. Most causes of wet breathing are remedied by replacing, or properly attaching, the responsible components, or by removing detritus and cleaning the exhaust valve and port.

=== Excessive work of breathing ===
High work of breathing can be caused by high inhalation resistance, high exhalation resistance or both. High inhalation resistance can be caused by high cracking pressure, low interstage pressure, friction in second stage valve moving parts, excessive spring loading, or sub-optimum valve design. It can usually be improved by servicing and tuning, but some regulators cannot deliver high flow at great depths without high work of breathing. High exhalation resistance is usually due to a problem with the exhaust valves, which can stick, stiffen due to deterioration of the materials, or may have an insufficient flow passage area for the service. Work of breathing increases with gas density, and therefore with depth. Total work of breathing for the diver is a combination of physiological work of breathing and mechanical work of breathing. It is possible for this combination to exceed the capacity of the diver, who can then suffocate due to carbon dioxide toxicity.

=== Juddering, shuddering and moaning ===
This is caused by an irregular and unstable flow from the second stage, It may be caused by unstable feedback between flow rate in the second stage body and diaphragm deflection opening the valve, which is not sufficient to cause free-flow, but enough to cause the system to hunt. It is more common on high-performance regulators which are tuned for maximum flow and minimum work of breathing, particularly out of the water, and often reduces or resolves when the regulator is immersed and the ambient water damps the movement of the diaphragm and other moving parts. Desensitising the second stage by closing venturi assists or increasing the valve spring pressure often stops this problem. Juddering may also be caused by excessive but irregular friction of valve moving parts.

=== Physical damage to the housing or components ===
Damage such as cracked housings, torn or dislodged mouthpieces, damaged exhaust fairings, can cause gas flow problems or leaks, or can make the regulator uncomfortable to use or difficult to breathe from.

Use of a contaminated or non-compatible regulator with high oxygen fraction gas at high pressure can lead to internal ignition, which may merely destroy a seal or other minor component, or burn up a significant part of the equipment and surroundings.

== Backflow ==
Backflow of water into a scuba regulator can occur if the supply pressure drops below ambient pressure and the demand valve is opened. This is not a regulator malfunction, but it can be harmful to the equipment if salt water gets into the mechanism and it is not completely removed, as salt crystals may form and cause wear, jamming or corrosion of the moving parts, which may later cause serious malfunction. This can occur in two basic scenarios:

- If the cylinder valve is closed and the demand valve is purged, interstage pressure will drop, and if the diver then descends sufficiently, ambient pressure may rise to more than the interstage pressure, and water could leak back through the demand vale, past the second stage valve seat, and into the low pressure hose. This cannot happen as long as the cylinder pressure gauge shows a pressure higher than ambient and the first stage is functioning normally, so it is easy to check, and can only happen during and after a descent with a closed cylinder valve.
- Backflow can also occur if the cylinder is emptied to ambient pressure followed by a descent with the cylinder valve open. In this case the water can pass through both stages of the regulator into the cylinder. If this occurs, both cylinder and regulator must be internally decontaminated.

== Service and repair ==
Most regulators are fairly simple and robust mechanisms, and many do not require special tools for servicing, but for breathing gas supply they are life-support equipment, and there are usually legal implications to working on the functional components for a client, so while in most places it would be acceptable to service one's own life-support equipment, a service technician is generally expected to be certified as competent to work on a regulator for a client.

== See also ==
- Diving rebreather#Failure modes
