= Apeks =

British manufacturer of scuba diving equipment

Apeks Marine Equipment Ltd
- Trade name: Apeks
- Industry: Scuba diving equipment
- Founded: 1974
- Founder: Ken Ainscough, Eric Partington
- Headquarters: Blackburn, UK
- Parent: Aqualung Group
- Website: uk.apeksdiving.com

Apeks Marine Equipment Ltd. is a manufacturer of scuba diving equipment based in Blackburn, Lancashire, England. The company is best known for its diving regulators (especially for cold water use) as well as dry suit valves, which are provided to many dry suit manufacturers. Apeks equipment is used by several militaries and emergency services, including the Royal Navy.

The company was founded in 1974 by Ken Ainscough and Eric Partington, with its name being an anagram of their initials. In 1997, the company was acquired by the Aqualung Group, which at the time was called Aqua Lung International.
