= Dry suit =

Watertight clothing that seals the wearer from cold and hazardous liquids

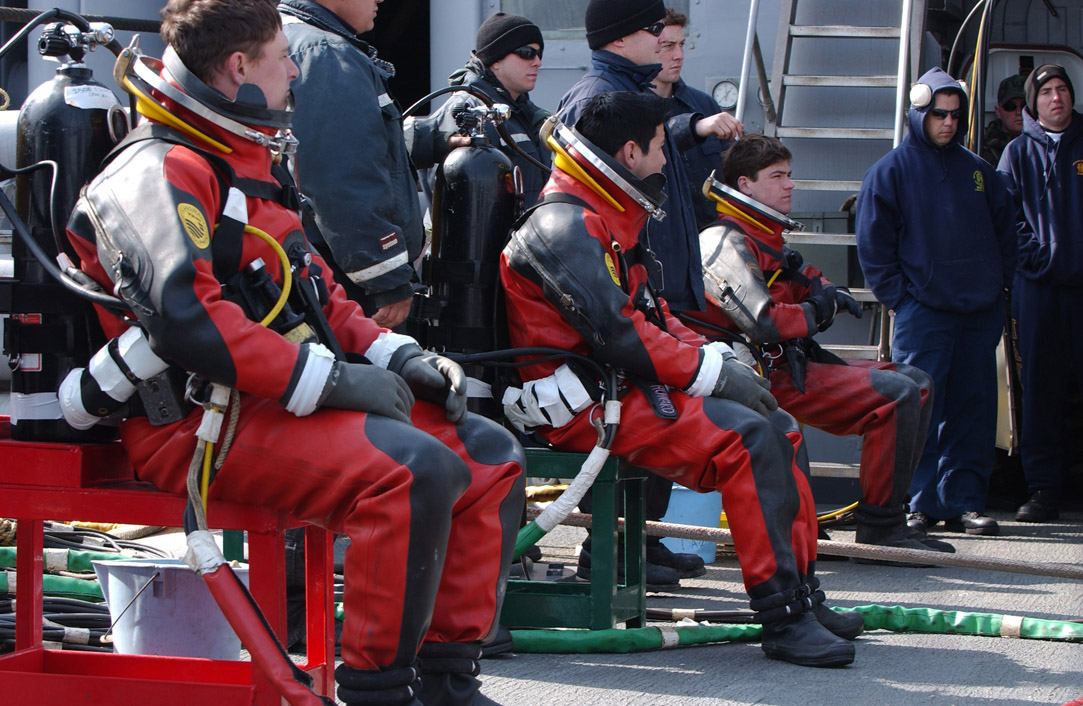
- U.S. Navy divers in contamination dry suits preparing to dive
- Uses: Environmental protection of underwater divers, boaters and other people who may be immersed in water.
- Inventor: Augustus Siebe (1837)
- Related items: Diving suit, Wetsuit, Survival suit, Hazmat suit

A dry suit or drysuit provides the wearer with environmental protection by way of thermal insulation and exclusion of water, and is worn by divers, boaters, water sports enthusiasts, and others who work or play in or near cold or contaminated water. A dry suit normally protects the whole body except the head, hands, and possibly the feet. In hazmat configurations, however, all of these are covered as well.

The main difference between dry suits and wetsuits is that dry suits are designed to prevent water from entering. This generally allows better insulation, making them more suitable for use in cold water. Dry suits can be uncomfortably hot in warm or hot air, and are typically more expensive and more complex to don. For divers, they add some degree of operational complexity and hazard as the suit must be inflated and deflated with changes in depth in order to minimize "squeeze" on descent or uncontrolled rapid ascent due to excessive buoyancy, which requires additional skills for safe use. Dry suits provide passive thermal protection: Undergarments are worn for thermal insulation against heat transfer to the environment and are chosen to suit expected conditions. When this is insufficient, active warming or cooling may be provided by chemical or electrically powered heating accessories.

The essential components are the waterproof shell, the seals, and the watertight entry closure. A number of accessories are commonly fitted, particularly to dry suits used for diving, for safety, comfort and convenience of use. Gas inflation and exhaust equipment are generally used for diving applications, primarily for maintaining the thermal insulation of the undergarments, but also for buoyancy control and to prevent squeeze.

== Function ==
The dry suit is a form of exposure suit, a garment worn to protect the user from adverse environmental conditions. The two most common purposes are to insulate the wearer against excessive heat loss, and to isolate the wearer from direct contact with a liquid environment during immersion or repeated multi-directional contact with bulk liquids or spray. Most often the liquid is water, usually without significant contaminants, but dry suits also have applications in isolation from hazardous materials and biological contaminants.

Most of the insulation function is provided by passive thermal protection in the form of garments worn under the dry suit, The suit itself has the primary function of keeping the insulating garments dry, and allowing them to be maintained at sufficient loft to provide adequate insulation by adding dry gas to the interior of the suit and releasing excess gas. Active heating systems may also be used but are less popular.

Isolation of the wearer from contact with the environment for purposes other than thermal insulation usually requires the entire surface of the skin to be kept dry and uncontaminated by the ambient environment. This requires that the seal between the breathing apparatus and the suit is also reliably watertight, which is most effectively provided by sealing the suit to a helmet with redundant series exhaust valves, or a return of exhaled gas to the surface by hose, similar to a gas reclaim system, though there are applications where a lesser level of isolation is acceptable.

Dry suits should not leak, but once the suit is sealed, interior humidity rises to 100% and condensation will occur on cold surfaces such as the inside of the suit. A certain amount of dampness is inevitable and common on the inside of the suit after a dive, and is acceptable provided the diver remains warm. Flexing the wrists and large movements of the head may allow water to enter along raised or sunken tendons. This is normal, and to some extent can be avoided or reduced with practice. It can be prevented by attaching the gloves directly to the suit and by sealing the suit to the helmet.

=== Heat loss ===
There are two physiological aspects of heat loss of particular relevance to the diver: Cold shock response and hypothermia.

Cold shock response is the physiological response of organisms to sudden cold, especially cold water, and is a common cause of death from immersion in very cold water, such as by falling through thin ice. The immediate shock of the cold causes involuntary inhalation, which if underwater can result in drowning. The cold water can also cause heart attack due to vasoconstriction; the heart has to work harder to pump the same volume of blood throughout the body, and for people with heart disease, this additional workload can cause the heart to go into arrest. This effect is prevented or mitigated by almost any dry suit, as the cold water is kept from direct contact with most of the body and the immediate heat loss is reduced considerably. A person who survives the initial minute of trauma after falling into icy water can survive for at least thirty minutes before succumbing to hypothermia provided they don't drown. However, the ability to perform useful work like staying afloat declines substantially after ten minutes as the body protectively cuts off blood flow to "non-essential" muscles.

Hypothermia is reduced body temperature that happens when a body dissipates more heat than it absorbs and produces, and is a major limitation to swimming or diving in cold water. The reduction in finger dexterity due to pain or numbness decreases general safety and work capacity, which consequently increases the risk of other injuries. Body heat is lost much more quickly in water than in air, so water temperatures that would be quite reasonable as outdoor air temperatures can lead to hypothermia in inadequately protected divers, although it is not often the direct clinical cause of death. The effectiveness of a dry suit in preventing or delaying hypothermia depends on its insulating value.

There are two major routes for heat loss. Respiratory and through the skin. The mechanisms of respiratory heat loss are heating the inspired gas and humidifying the inspired gas by latent heat of evaporation. While they are major factors in diver comfort and safety, these are not influenced by the use of a dry suit. The loss of heat through the skin by radiation, conduction, and convection is the aspect which can be controlled by an exposure suit, and the one for which dry suits are effective and appropriate.

Skin will heat up gas and clothing inside a dry suit by radiation and conduction. Convection will transport heated gas within the suit, and may take it to places where it may be transferred through the suit shell more rapidly. Heat transfer by radiation occurs through a medium that is transparent to infrared radiation of the relevant wavelengths. This is mostly the gas, and the radiation paths are short, multiple, and with small temperature differences, so the effects are relatively small. Heat conduction is kinetic energy transfer by molecular or atomic collision. It has the more important role in heat transfer through a diving suit. Conduction occurs between the diver's skin and the gas and suit materials in contact with it, and through these materials to the shell, through the shell to the surrounding water, where it is rapidly removed by convection. Conduction heat loss is strongly influenced by thermal conductivity of the gas in the suit.

Convective heat transfer is the consequence of movement of heat carried by a gas or liquid from one place to another, where conduction can occur. It can considerably speed up heat transfer, so thermal protection of the undersuit is improved when it limits convection of the gas within the suit. Convective heat transfer in the suit is strongly influenced by the freedom of the gas in the suit to move around, which is increased when there are large gas spaces, and reduced when the gas is constrained by the loft of the fabric. There is also heat transfer within the suit by evaporation of moisture in contact with the skin, and condensation on the inner surface of the shell. This is reduced by wicking it away from the skin before it evaporates, and preventing condensate on the inside of the shell from wetting the inner layer of the undersuit.

== Essential components ==
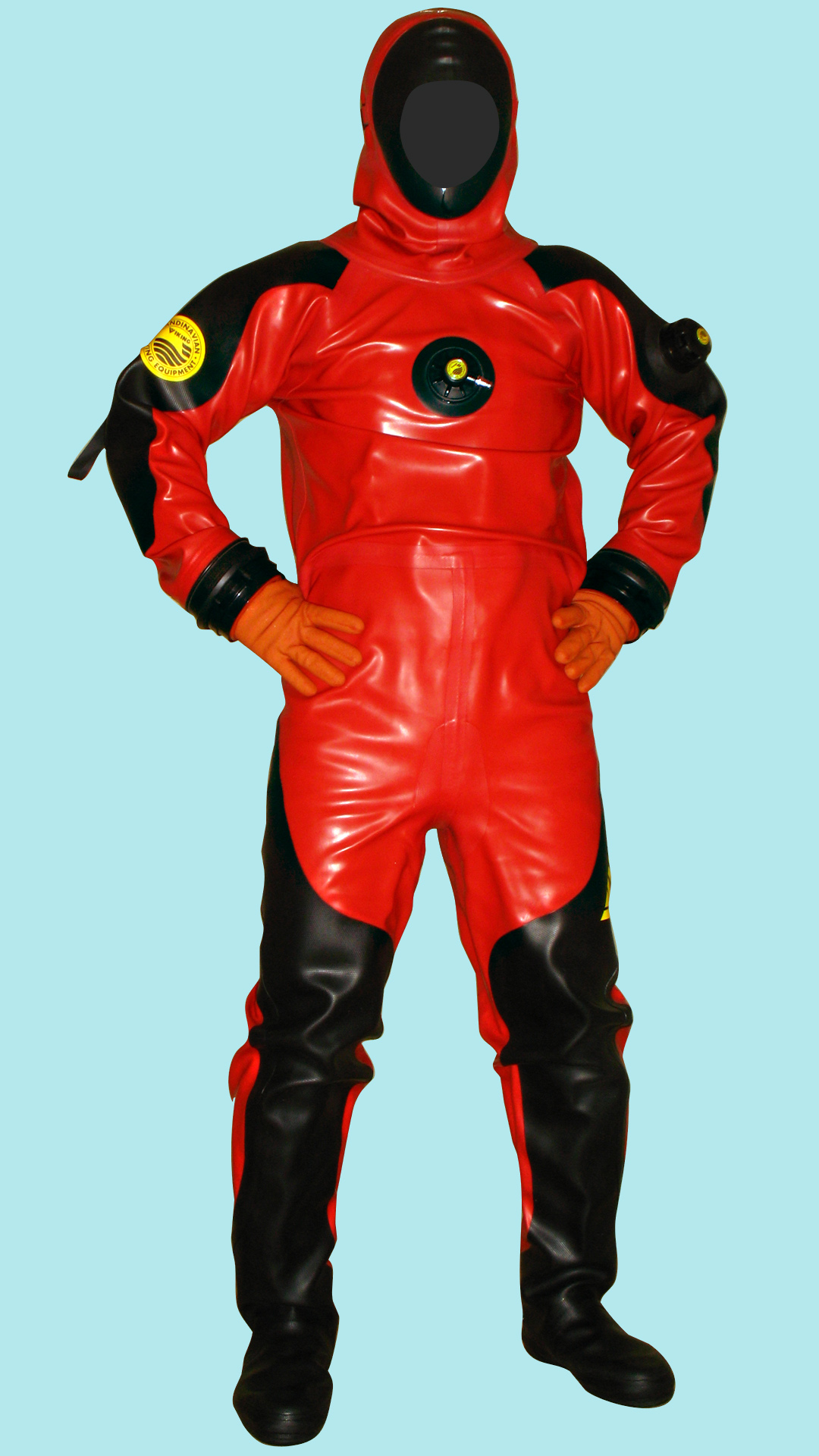
Rubber on two way stretch knit fabric has an external surface that is relatively easy to decontaminate

The essential components include a shell of watertight material, sufficiently flexible to allow the wearer to function adequately, seals where parts of the body pass through the suit while in use, and a method of sealing the access opening while the suit is worn. An inflation valve with a gas supply and a dump valve are generally provided on dry suits used for diving, but were not standard on early models, and are not needed when the suit is sealed to the helmet and the helmet space is open to the interior of the suit, or for suits only used for surface activities.

=== Shell ===
The main part of the dry suit is a waterproof shell made from a membrane type material, closed cell foamed neoprene or a hybrid of both. Insulation may be provided in part by the suit shell, but is usually mainly provided by thermal insulation clothing worn under the suit, which relies to a large extent on trapped air for its insulating properties.

==== Membrane ====
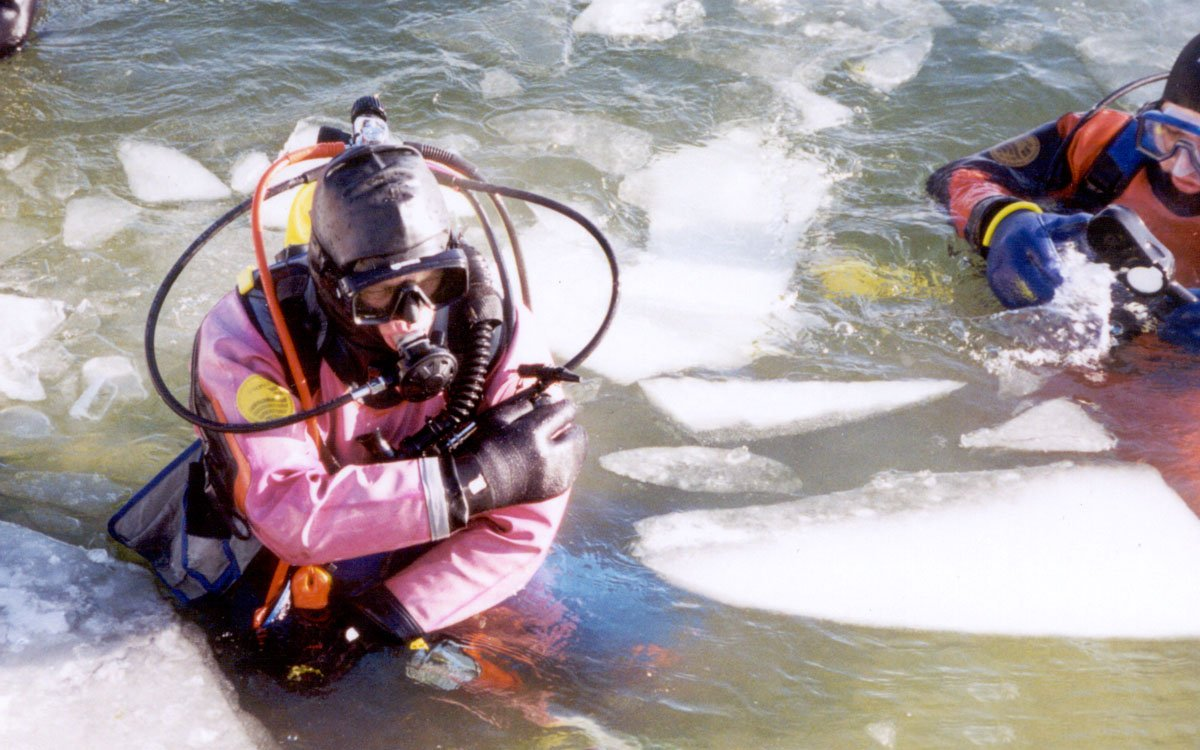
Membrane drysuit in icy water

Membrane dry suits are made from thin materials which have little thermal insulation. They are commonly made of stockinette fabric coated with vulcanized rubber, laminated layers of nylon and butyl rubber known as trilaminate, or Cordura proofed with an inner layer of polyurethane. With the exception of the rubber-coated stockinette, membrane dry suits typically do not stretch, so they need to be made slightly oversized and baggy to allow flexibility at the joints through the wearer's range of motion and to allow the hands and feet to pass through without difficulty. This makes membrane dry suits easy to put on and take off, provides a good range of motion for the wearer when correctly sized and sufficiently inflated, and makes them relatively comfortable to wear for long periods out of the water compared to a wetsuit or close-fitting neoprene dry suit, as the wearer does not have to pull against rubber elasticity to move or keep joints flexed.

To stay warm in a membrane suit, the user must wear a thermally insulating undersuit, typically made from synthetic fiber, which is considered preferable to natural materials, since synthetic materials have better insulating properties when damp or wet from sweat, seepage, or a leak. A low capacity for water absorption, retention of loft under mild compression, and quick drying after use are also desirable characteristics.

Reasonable care must be taken not to puncture or tear membrane dry suits, because buoyancy and insulation depend entirely on the air layer held in the undersuit, (whereas a wetsuit normally allows water to enter, and retains its insulation despite it). The dry suit material offers essentially no buoyancy or insulation itself, so if the dry suit leaks or is torn, water can soak the undersuit, with a corresponding loss of buoyancy and insulation.

Membrane dry suits for surface use may also be made of a waterproof but breathable material like Gore-Tex to enable comfortable wear without excessive humidity and buildup of condensation. This function does not work underwater. Sailors and boaters who intend to stay out of the water may prefer this type of suit, but the fabric is less tolerant of rough usage, and may develop leaks more easily.

Membrane suits rely entirely on thermal undergarments for thermal insulation. The thermal undergarments rely on large volumes of trapped air for insulation, and any excess air trapped within the suit is not well constrained from migrating to the high points of the suit when diving. The loose fit necessary to allow reasonable freedom of movement and to make it possible to get in and out of the suit creates baggy air pockets where trapped air accumulates if it is not vented immediately, and some of these air pockets form in the parts of the suit where they are least easily vented by a diver trimmed for efficient horizontal swimming. This combination makes it necessary for the diver to be more vigilant and increases task loading in buoyancy control, and thereby increases risk of overinflation incidents and uncontrolled ascents. These risks are reduced by use of a suit which has the minimum excess volume, which in most cases requires precise custom fitting. The large and baggy standard diving suits had the option of lacing up the back of the legs to reduce suit volume in the place where it was most hazardous, but this feature is not available on more recent suits, and the nearest functional substitute is gaiters over the lower legs. Bagginess in the torso and arms is less problematic as excess gas in these areas is much easier to vent, and will usually do so automatically if the dump valve is set correctly.

==== Neoprene ====
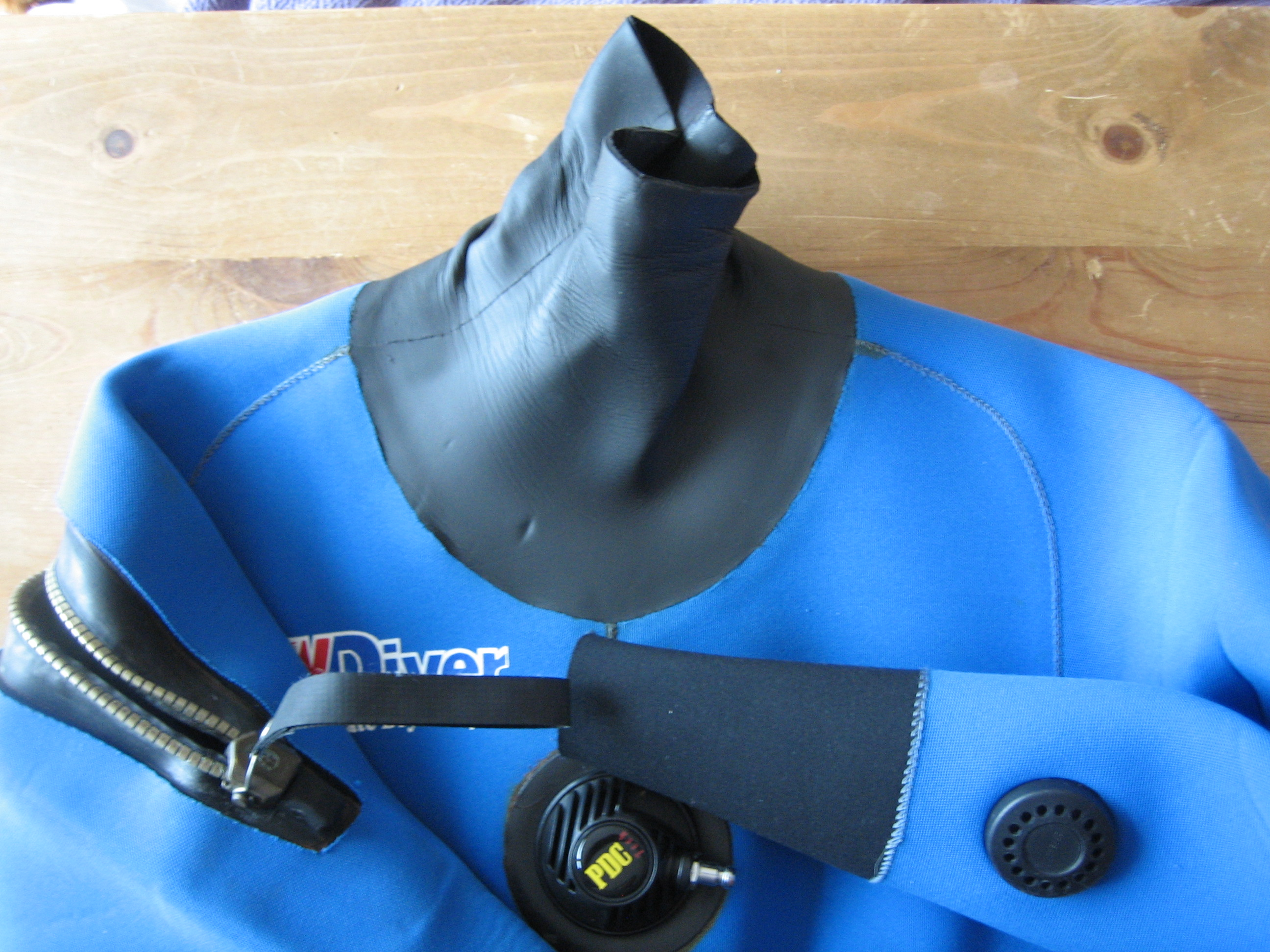
The neck seal, the zip, the inflator, a wrist seal, and the manual cuff vent of a neoprene dry suit

Neoprene is a type of synthetic rubber which can be foamed during manufacture to a high proportion of tiny enclosed gas bubbles, forming a buoyant and thermally-insulating material, called "foamed neoprene", "foam-neoprene" or "expanded neoprene". Wetsuits are made from this material as it is a good insulator, waterproof, and is flexible enough for comfortable wear. The neoprene alone is very flexible and elastic, but not very resistant to tearing, so it is usually skinned with a layer of knitted fabric bonded to each side for strength and abrasion resistance. Foamed neoprene may be used for the shell of a drysuit, providing insulation in proportion to the thickness due to the gas within the material, as in a standard wetsuit. If torn or punctured, leading to flooding, a foam-neoprene suit retains the insulation and buoyancy of the gas bubbles in the foam, like a wet suit. Although foamed-neoprene dry suits provide some insulation, thermal under-suits are usually worn in cold water.

Neoprene dry suits are generally not as easy to put on and remove as are membrane dry suits, largely due to a closer fit which is possible due to the inherent elasticity of the material, and partly due to greater weight. As with wetsuits, their buoyancy and thermal protection decreases with depth as the air bubbles in the neoprene are compressed. The air or other gas in the dry fabric undergarments providing insulation under a dry suit is also compressed, but can be restored to an effective volume by inflating the drysuit at depth through an inflator valve, thus preventing "suit squeeze" and compacting of the air-filled undersuit. Foam-neoprene tends to shrink over the years as it loses gas from the foam and slowly becomes less flexible as it ages.

An alternative is crushed or compressed foam neoprene, which is less susceptible to volume changes when under pressure. Crushed neoprene is foam neoprene which has been hydrostatically compressed so much that the gas bubbles have been mostly eliminated, this retains the elasticity of foamed neoprene which allows freedom of movement, but does not provide much insulation, and is functionally more like a membrane suit.

==== Hybrid ====
Some suits marketed as hybrid suits combine the features of both types, with a membrane top attached to a neoprene bottom near the waist. The neoprene part may also be configured as a "farmer-john" salopette that covers the torso as well as the legs, with membrane sleeves. This style is often used for surface water sports, especially in very cold water. The tighter fitting lower part lets the wearer kick while swimming, and the looser fitting top allows easy arm movement. A close-fitting neoprene torso covering provides additional self-rescue or survival time if the suit leaks. Other manufacturers such as "Waterproof", use the term to refer to a membrane suit with a fitted liner of a relatively compression resistant porous 3-dimensional mesh, which creates a thin but resilient air space between the suit shell and the diver.

=== Seals ===
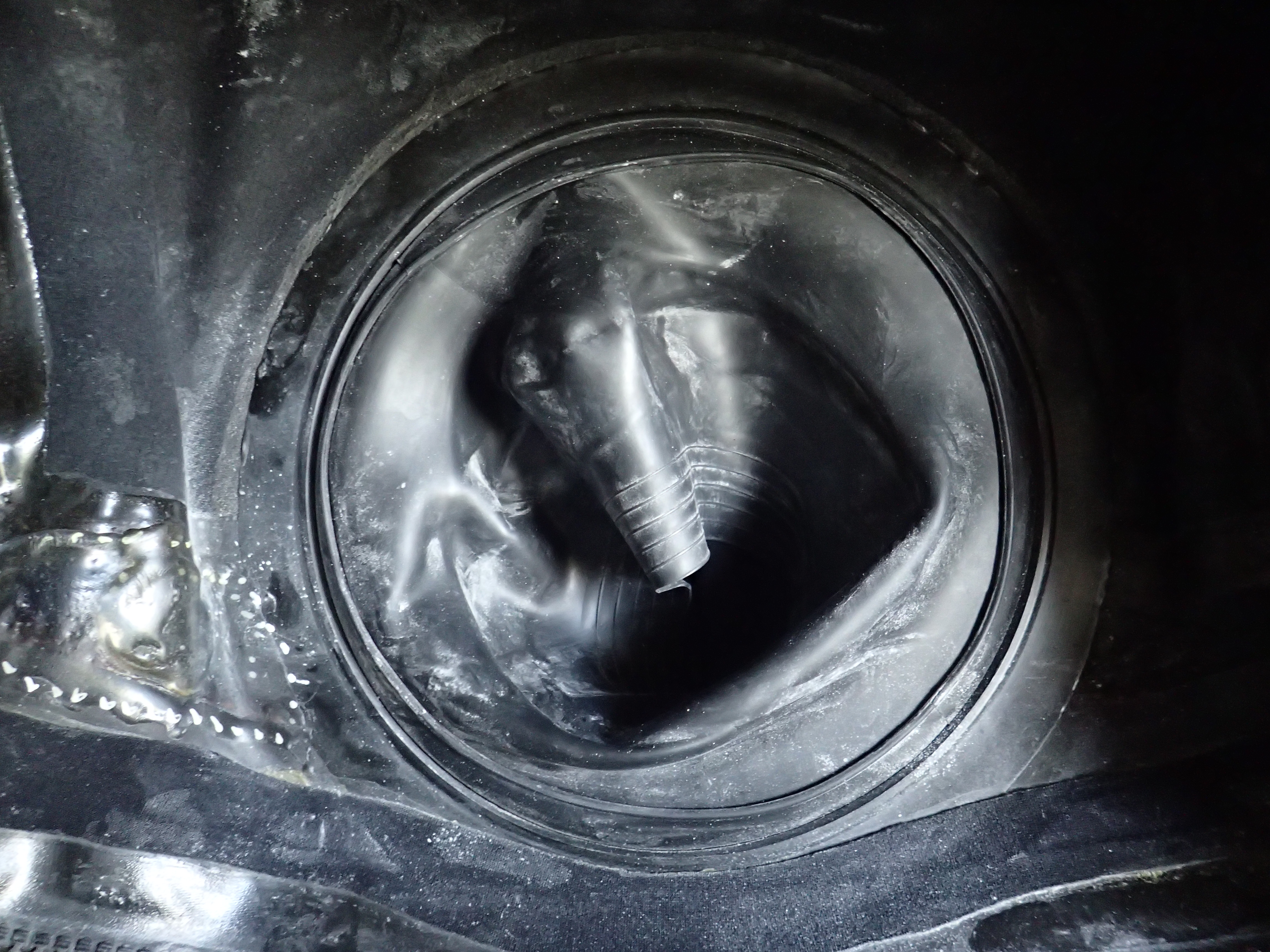
Silicone neck seal attached with clamping ring—view inside the suit

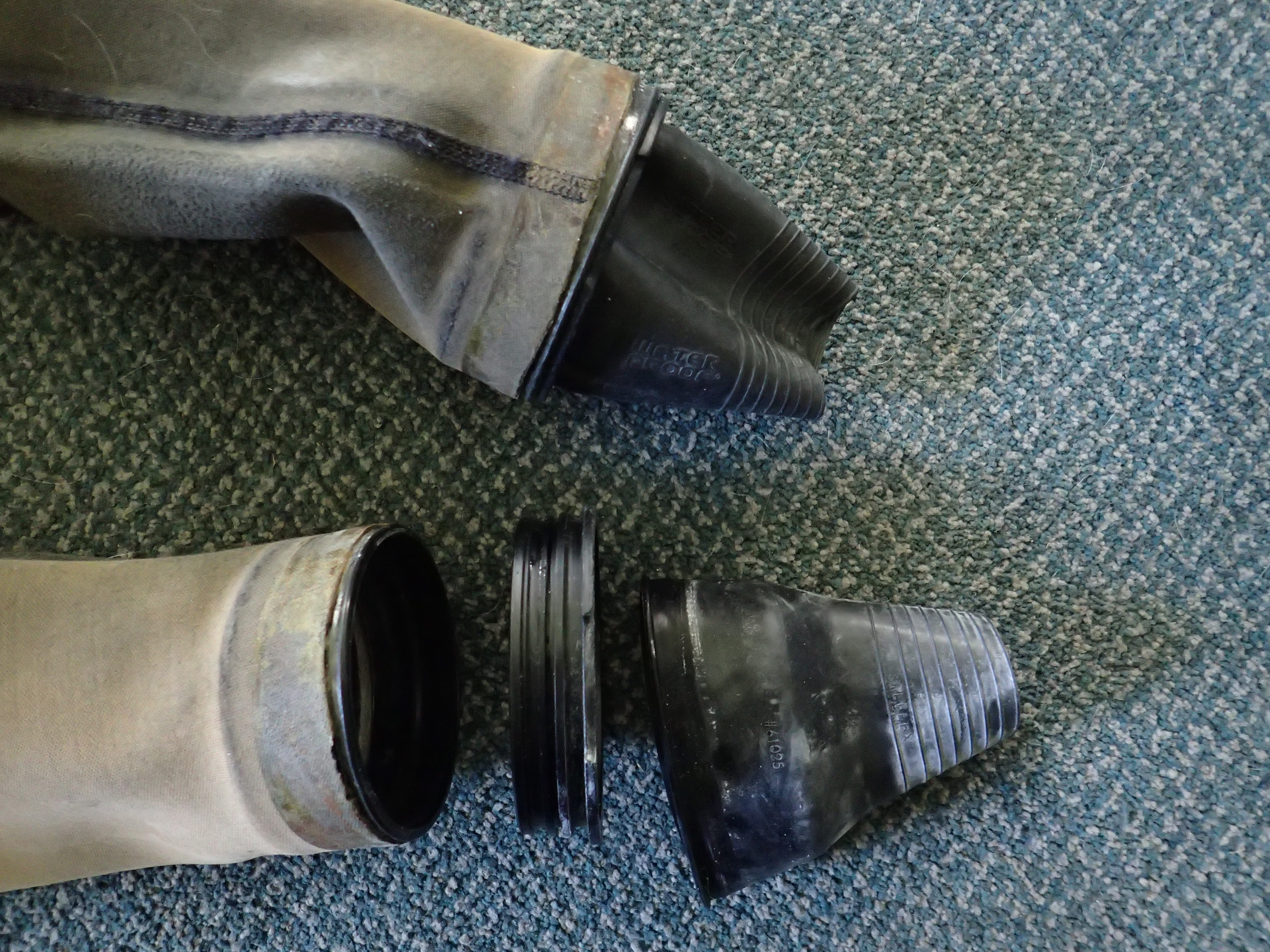
Silicone dry suit cuff seals with clip-on clamping rings: above—assembled, below—components

Seals, also known as gaskets, at the wrists and neck prevent water entering the suit by a close contact fit against the skin around the wrists and neck. The seals are not absolutely watertight, however, and the wearer may experience some seepage during use. The seals are typically made from latex rubber, foam neoprene, or silicone rubber. Latex seals are supple but easily damaged and deteriorate with exposure to oils, oxygen, and other materials, so they must be washed after use and replaced periodically, every two years or more often. Latex also causes an allergic reaction in some users. Neoprene seals last longer and are non-allergenic, but, being less elastic, let more water enter because they do not seal as effectively as latex seals to the contours of wrist and neck. They are also typically glued and sewn together to form a tube, and may leak along that seam.

A more recent innovation is the silicone seal, which is claimed to be as supple as latex, more flexible, yet far more durable. These are available as original equipment on some makes of dry suit. Silicone seals are hypoallergenic, but can not be glued to the suit, and must be attached using clip-on rings. The silicone seals are similar in mechanical strength to latex seals but do not deteriorate as rapidly from oxidation and chemical attack. They are initially relatively expensive, but can be replaced without tools by the user which reduces cost of replacement.

=== Waterproof entry ===
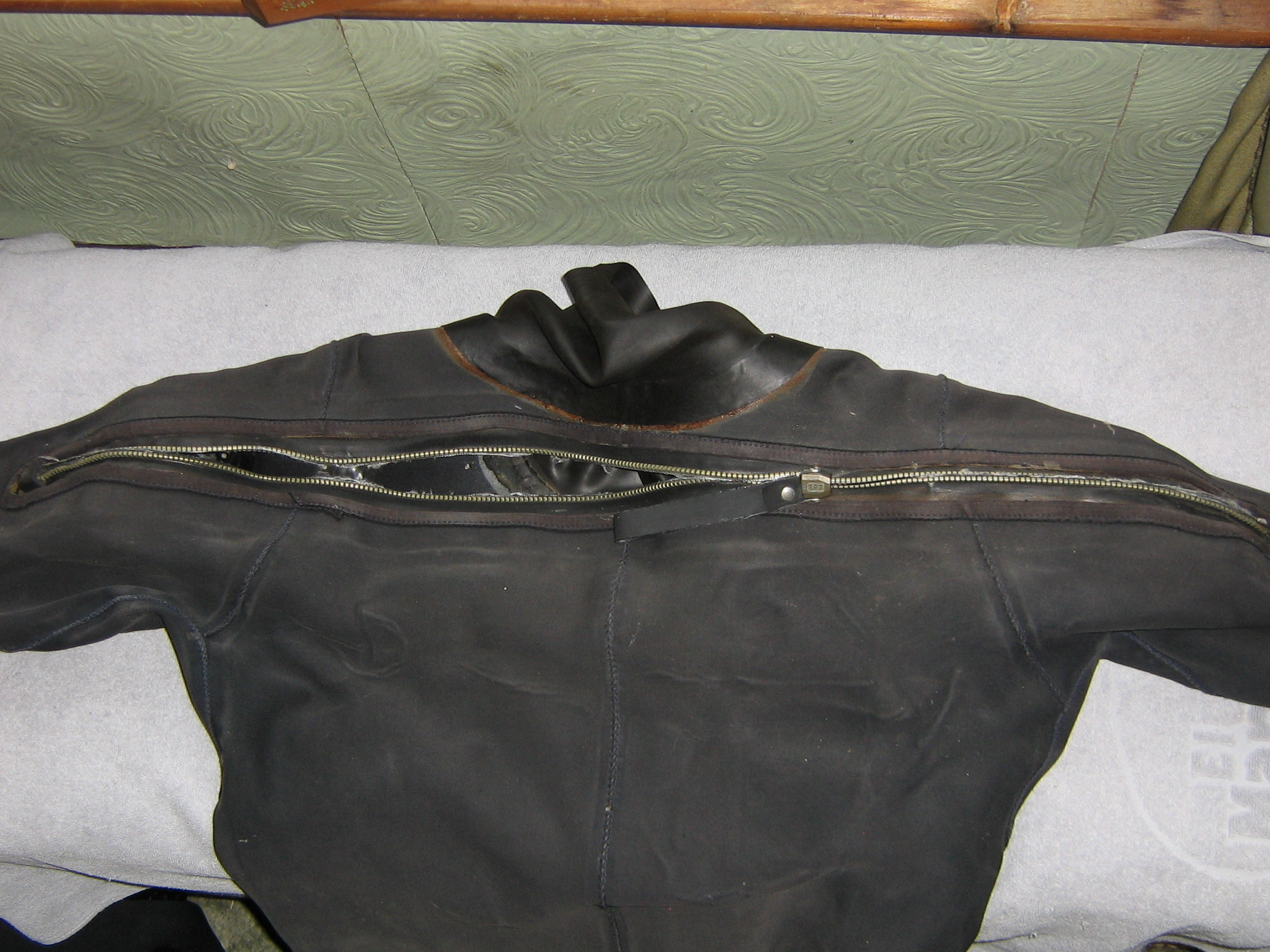
Shoulder (rear-entry) zipper

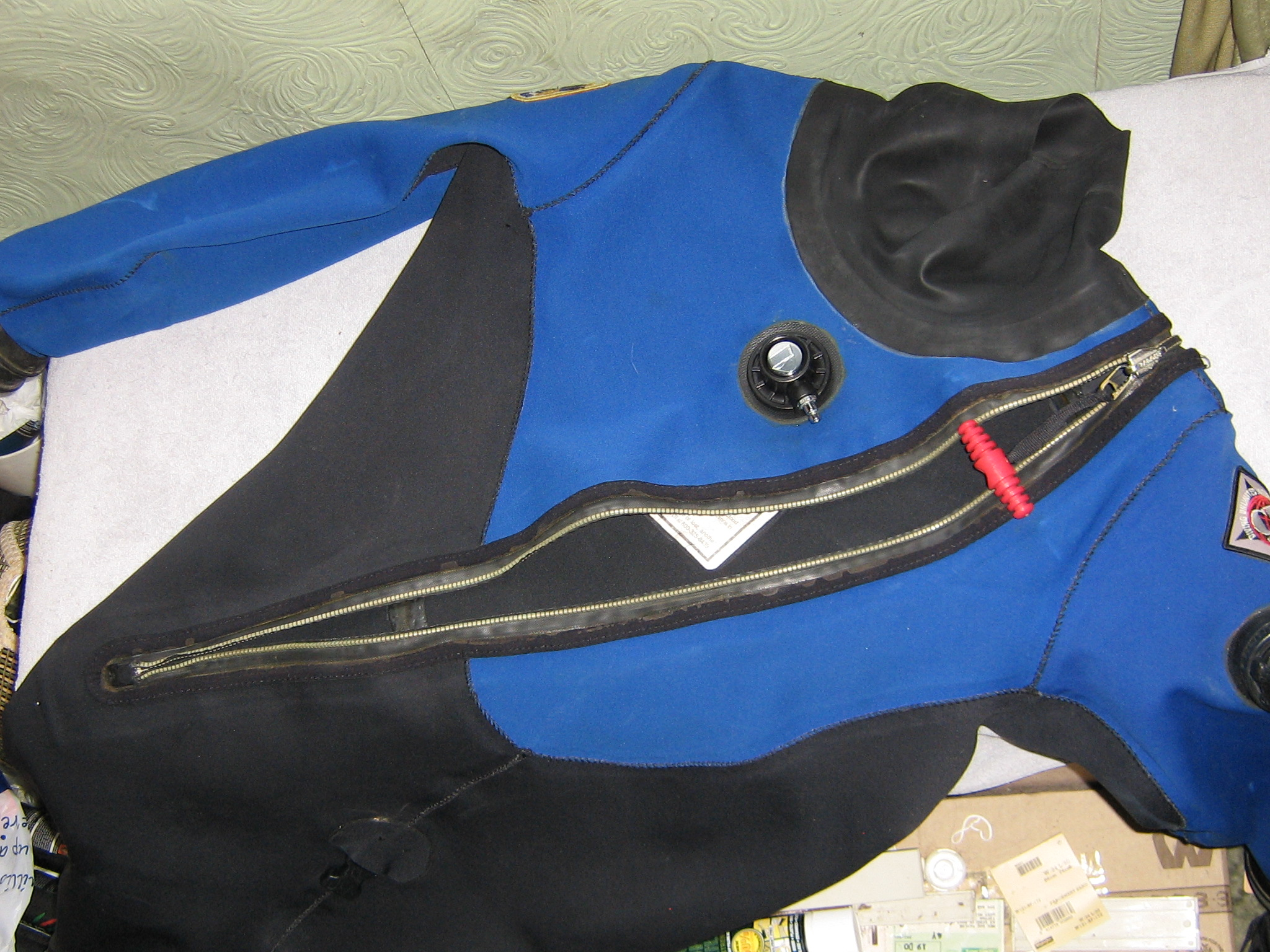
Front-entry zipper

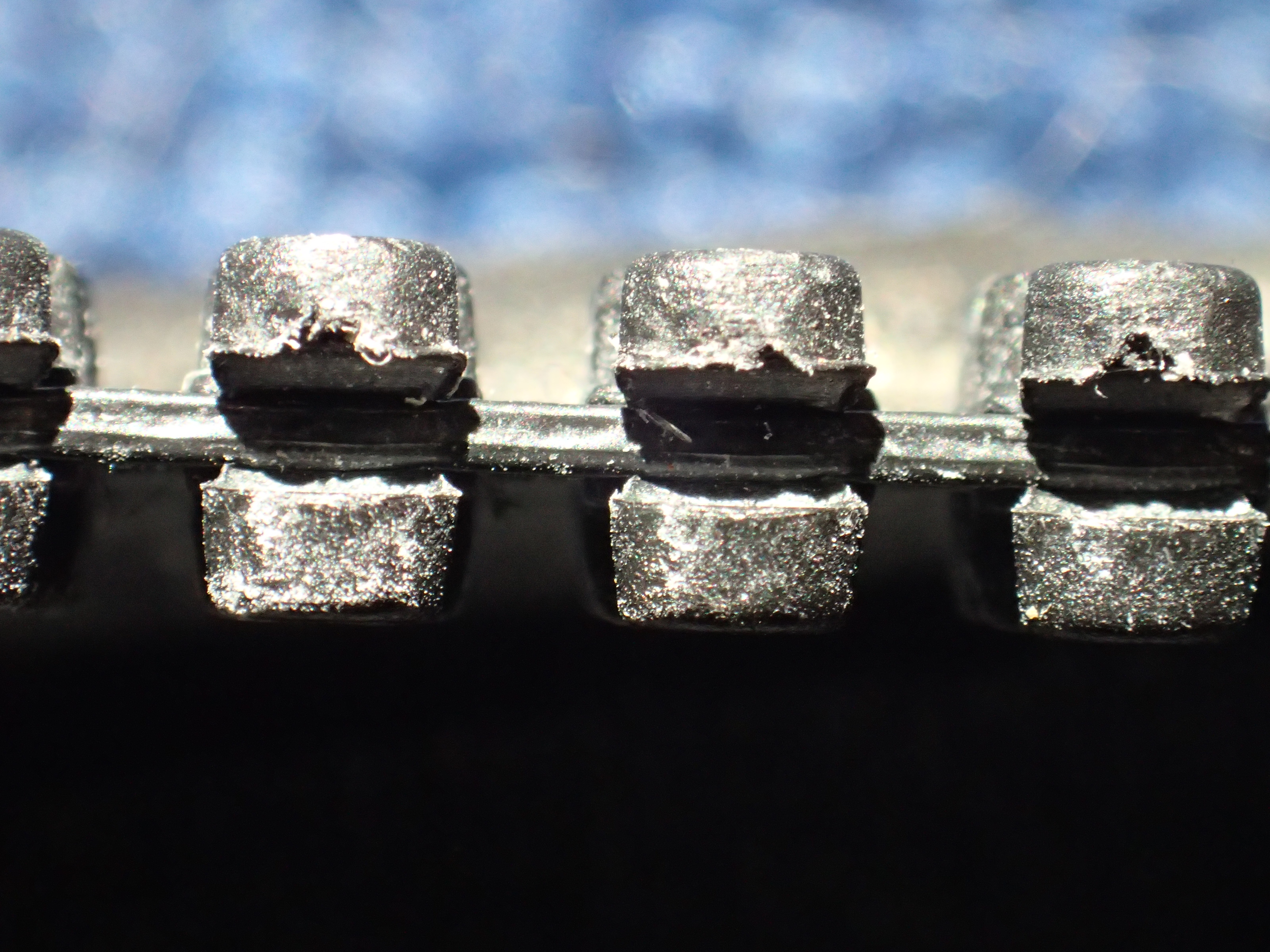
Plastic watertight dry suit zipper: tooth and seal edge detail - the watertight seal is made by pressing together the continuous ridge along the middle of the teeth when the zipper is closed.

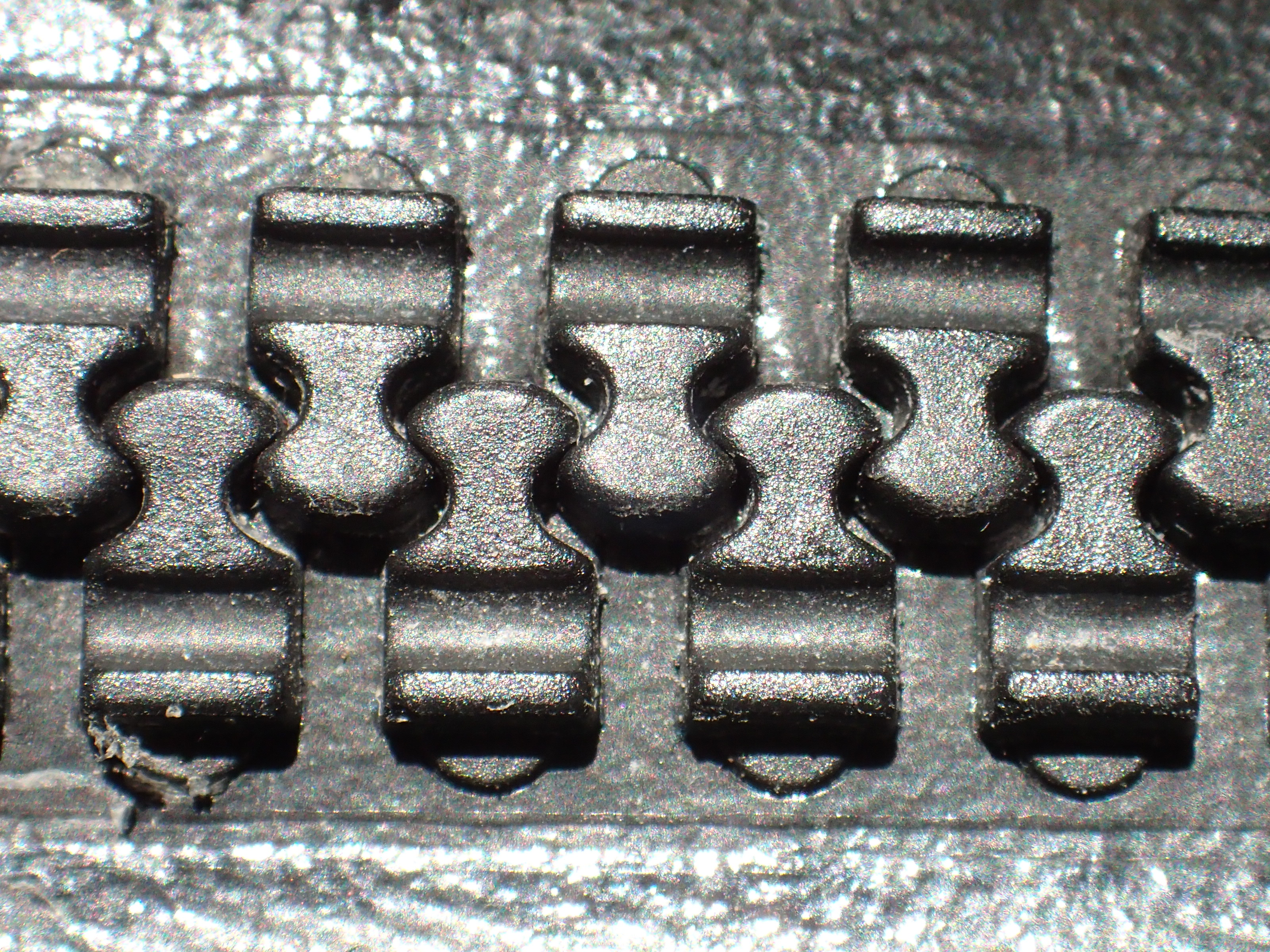
Watertight and airtight dry suit zipper made by TIZIP, Germany: Detail of closed teeth showing interlock above and (not visible) below the seal edge.

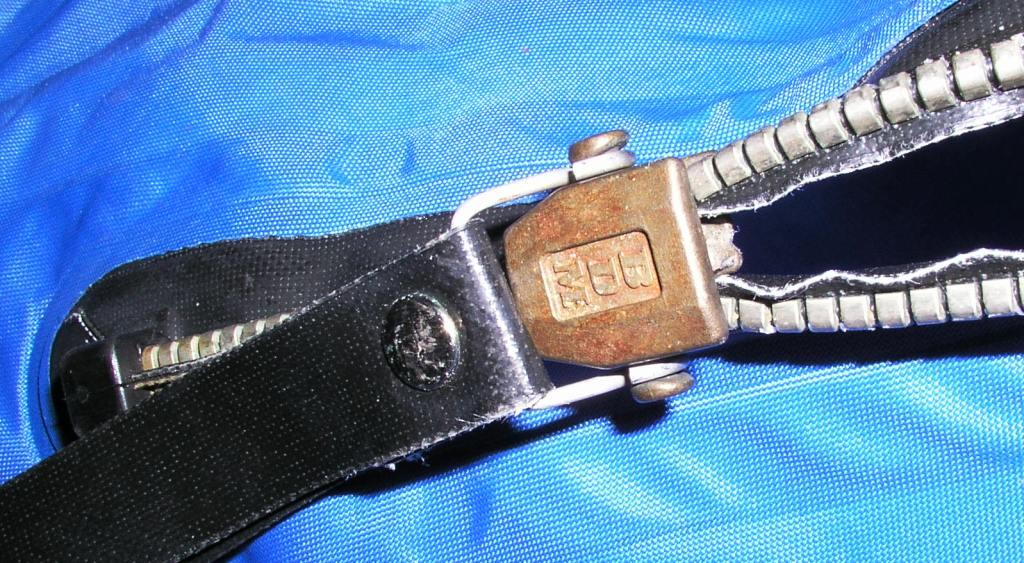
Waterproof zipper installed on a membrane type dry suit

Modern dry suits have a watertight zipper for entry and exit. The original bronze-toothed version was developed by NASA to hold air inside space suits. This complex and special zipper is one of the most expensive parts of the suit. Heavy-duty, medium, and lightweight versions are made. A later design uses injection moulded plastic teeth, and these are lighter, more flexible and less costly. The zipper is commonly installed across the back of the shoulders, since this placement compromises overall flexibility the least, and usually puts the least stress on the zipper — but this design normally means the wearer requires assistance to close and open the zipper. The other common zipper placement is diagonally across the front of the torso, which allows self-donning. Other designs place the zipper straight down the middle of the back (early Poseidon Unisuit), up one side of the front, around the back of the neck and partway back down the front (later model Poseidon Unisuit) or on a wide tubular chest tunnel-entry opening which is folded down and clipped round the waist after sealing the zip (some Typhoon suits). The waterproof-zipper is stiff, and cannot stretch at all, which can make it difficult for a user to get into and out of the suit. Dry suits may also be fitted with an extra waterproof "fly", "relief" or "convenience" zipper to let the user urinate when out of the water when the suit is worn for long periods.

Before truly watertight zippers were invented, other methods of keeping the suit waterproof at the entry point were used, with the most common being a long rubber tunnel entry on the chest or the back, which would be folded shut, then rolled together from the sides and finally folded and clamped with a metal clip or tied with surgical rubber tubing. Sometimes the entry tunnel protruded through a non-watertight zipper, which would be closed over it to hold the roll in place in the pocket so formed.

The alternatives to tunnel entry were neck entry and the two-piece suit. Neck-entry suits were sealed by overlapping the neck opening and the hood over a grooved neck ring, and clamping with a large elastic O-ring. The two-piece, or waist-entry suits, were sealed by rolling or folding the overlapped rubber skirts of the jacket and trousers together and these were held in place by a separate rubber cummerbund or a ring and rail clamping system much like the neck seal system, but using a grooved rubber belt and elastic loop.

== Accessories ==
=== Thermal undersuits ===
Most dry suits do not provide sufficient thermal insulation without suitable undergarments. The type of undergarment selected will depend on the environmental conditions, type of dry suit and the planned activity. The purpose of the undergarment is to maintain the wearer in comfortable thermal balance, where the heat lost is balanced by the heat generated by the user. More insulation is needed for colder conditions and for less energetic activity.

A balance of thermal comfort with freedom of movement, minimal variation in buoyancy with depth, and minimal effects on diver trim is one of the goals of undersuit selection for diving. For surface applications, thermal comfort with freedom of movement and minimum skin dampness from condensation is the target. Moisture management using wicking textiles is often used.

The principle of layered clothing can be used to provide a wider range of insulation possibilities from a relatively small range of underwear items, however this can only be done before entering the water. Most dry suit underwear insulates mainly by a trapped layer of gas in the garment, and this is largely lost if the gas is replaced by water in a flooded suit, so as an approximation, insulation is proportional to the combined thickness of the undergarments. The layering principle shows that the option of two layers of undergarment in two thicknesses allows three levels of insulation to be selected. Thin only, thick only, and both layers.

Some materials have better insulating properties than others when wet, and will keep the diver warmer if the suit leaks or floods. The best dry suit undergarment is the thinnest material that will provide the required insulation, by trapping air in the smallest spaces. These will require less air in the suit and thus less excess buoyancy for which weighting will be required.

The moisture given off by the human skin, even when not exercising and sweating, will condense against the inside of the dry suit, and the way this condensate is handled by the underwear material will influence the comfort of the diver. If the underwear soaks up this moisture it will feel cold and clammy, particularly if this layer is against the skin. Materials which wick the moisture away from the skin and do not soak up the condensate will be more comfortable. A thin polypropylene layer against the skin will keep moisture away from the skin, and may keep the main undersuit clean. Early thermal undersuits for drysuits were commonly made from wool, as it retains its insulating properties better when wet than most other natural fibres.

The fit of the underwear should allow the same range of movement as the suit itself, and together should allow the wearer to bend, squat, kneel, climb a ladder, fin and reach all critical parts of equipment worn on the body. Underwear which is flexible and stretches, particularly at the joints, will allow the diver more freedom of movement, and is less likely to chafe, and for diving use, materials which resist compaction under light pressure will maintain a more even thickness in use, which will provide better insulation for the same overall volume.

For cold-water use, especially diving under ice, the user will usually wear a thick undersuit. The thickness of undersuits varies and can be chosen by the wearer according to the water temperature. Thinsulate is one of the preferred fabrics for diving undersuits.

The hydrophobic qualities of Thinsulate help prevent water absorption which helps to maintain the insulating airspace even in the presence of free water. More recently, aerogel material is being added to conventional undergarments to increase the insulating properties of those garments. Polar fleece is a good insulator with good stretch, is lightweight, and dries quickly if it gets wet. It is also hypoallergenic and comfortable against the skin. Polyester liners can add to the insulation and will wick perspiration away from the skin. Cotton absorbs moisture and saturates easily, and will then rapidly conduct heat away from the body, so it is not used. Most dry-suit underwear is full length, either as a one-piece or jacket and trousers, but a vest may be added for extra insulation on the torso, and a "Farmer John" salopette style trousers with jacket is flexible and puts extra insulation where it is most useful.

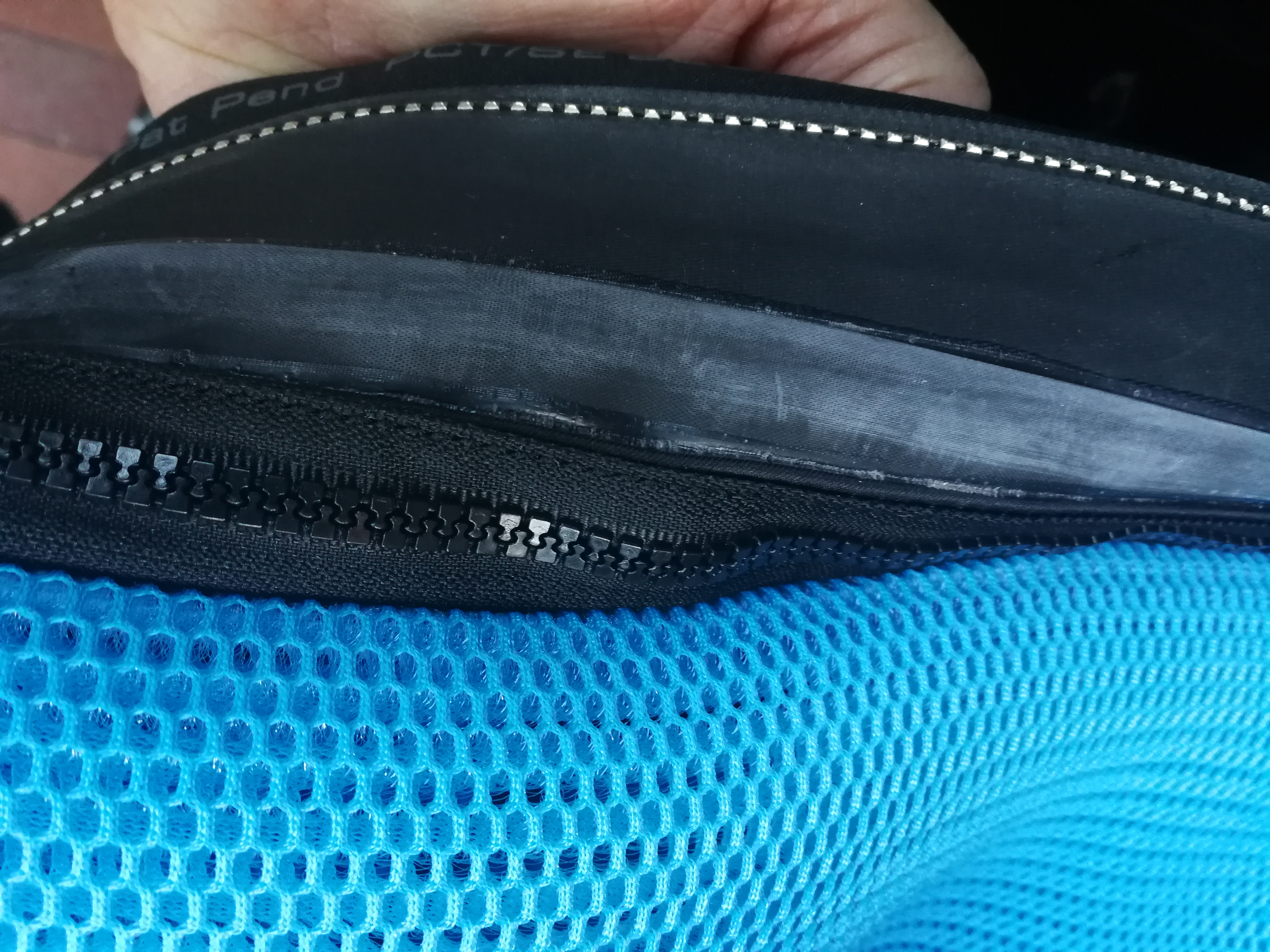
Mesh dry suit liner attachment to inside of suit

The dry suit manufacturer "Waterproof" has introduced an unusual style of suit liner for diving drysuits which is made of a compression resistant but light and flexible coarse nylon mesh, and attached to the inside of the trilaminate drysuit shell when in use, which maintains an air gap between the undersuit and the inner surface of the shell, and which keeps condensate that forms on the inside of the shell from contact with the undersuit, so the undersuit is more likely to remain dry.

Neoprene dry suits are made from a foam-rubber sheet containing tiny air bubbles, which provide insulation by themselves, and can eliminate the need for an under-suit, or reduce the thickness needed for the under-suit fabric, but the bubbles in the neoprene are compressed and the insulation of the suit decreases with depth in the same way as for a wetsuit. Crushed neoprene provides the flexibility of neoprene with the consistent buoyancy and insulation of membrane suits, but is heavy like other neoprene suits and provides less insulation in shallow water than regular foamed neoprene. A neoprene wet suit can also be worn under a membrane dry suit for insulation and extra protection against condensation and leaks, but it will compress with depth, as will any flexible closed cell material.

=== Suspenders ===
Some dry suits are provided with internally attached suspenders (British English: braces), which when hooked over the shoulders, will hold the trouser section up while the top part of the suit has not been fully dressed into by the diver, this is also convenient if the suit is partly removed between dives for comfort. The suspenders also help to keep the trousers fully lifted if the torso of a membrane suit is a little long to provide enough space for the diver to bend the torso comfortably when in use. If the crotch hangs too low it encumbers the legs when finning, and increases the risk of the feet pulling out of the boots in an inversion.

=== Hoods ===
The dry suit may also have an integral hood, which seals water out around the wearer's face, and helps keep the wearer's head warm. The integral hood is often latex rubber that fits tightly around the head, but can also be made mainly from neoprene or membrane to allow an insulating cap to be worn under the hood. Care must be taken to avoid the hood making an airtight seal around either of the ears, as this could cause an eardrum bursting outwards at depth. Separate hoods are generally neoprene wetsuit hoods with a flare at the bottom opening, worn over the neck seal. Some suits are made with an external "warm neck collar" around the base of the neck seal, which allows the flare of the hood to tuck in over the outside of the seal and under the collar. This can keep the neck significantly warmer, since the seal itself provides little insulation.

=== Helmets ===
To provide more protection to the head against impact, to secure the airway, to fully isolate the diver from the water, and to permit easy communication with the surface and between divers, a rigid metal or fibre-reinforced plastic diving helmet may be worn with the dry suit. This can be separate from the dry suit with its own watertight neck seal, or it can be clamped onto a neck ring attached to the suit, so that air can flow between the helmet and the suit.

=== Boots or socks ===
Most commercial diving dry suits have heavy duty integral boots. Sport diving suits may have lightweight integral boots or soft neoprene booties. Rock boots or heavy working boots may also be worn over integral socks of latex or neoprene or the same material as the rest of the suit. Boots which are stiff at the ankle make finning inefficient and are unsuitable for many diving applications where mobility is important. If the suit will be used by a diver who needs to fin efficiently on some dives and to walk on sharp surfaces on other dives, it is more effective to wear boots suited to the dive over a dry suit with integral socks.

Latex rubber ankle seals are sometimes fitted in place of socks and can allow better foot control of water skis and surfboards. Survival suits may have neoprene socks of the same material as the suit, with tougher soles and ankle ties to keep them on the feet, as the "one-size fits all" socks must be too big for most users if they are to accommodate the few with larger feet.

=== Gloves, mitts, and three-finger mitts ===
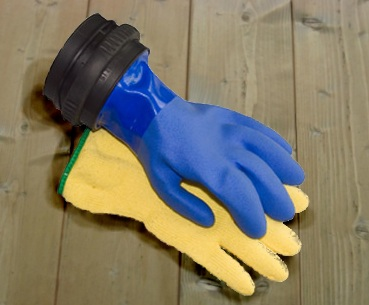
Dry glove with attachment ring and liner

Dry suits may have wrist seals, permanently attached gloves or mitts, or removable dry gloves connected by attachment rings.

Neoprene wetsuit gloves are pulled over the top of wrist seals. They are wet gloves and vary considerably in effectiveness depending on construction and fit. As they are not watertight they do not fail catastrophically when damaged, and are reasonably tough.

Permanently attached gloves or mitts are unusual, It is more common for them to be connected by attachment rings. Either way, the absence of a wrist seal makes getting in and out of the suit much easier since there is no need for the suit to tightly seal around the wrists. It may be necessary to use a wrist strap to prevent loose gloves pulling off the hands when filled with air. Dry gloves can also be fitted over a wrist seal, which prevents leakage into the sleeves if the gloves are penetrated. Rubber or rubber coated stretch fabric dry gloves are the most effective at insulation while they remain dry inside, Insulation is provided by liner gloves worn underneath, which may be chosen to suit insulation and dexterity requirements.

Full-hand diving mitts can be sometimes useful in extreme environments such as ice diving, but significantly reduce dexterity and grip. Dry gloves and mitts usually allow a dry insulating glove to be worn underneath.

Three-finger mitts are a compromise between gloves and full mittens. In the three-finger mitts, the fingers are arranged with the index finger in a separate pocket to the other three fingers. This provides slightly better hand-grasping dexterity while still permitting heavy insulation around the hands.

=== Attachment rings ===
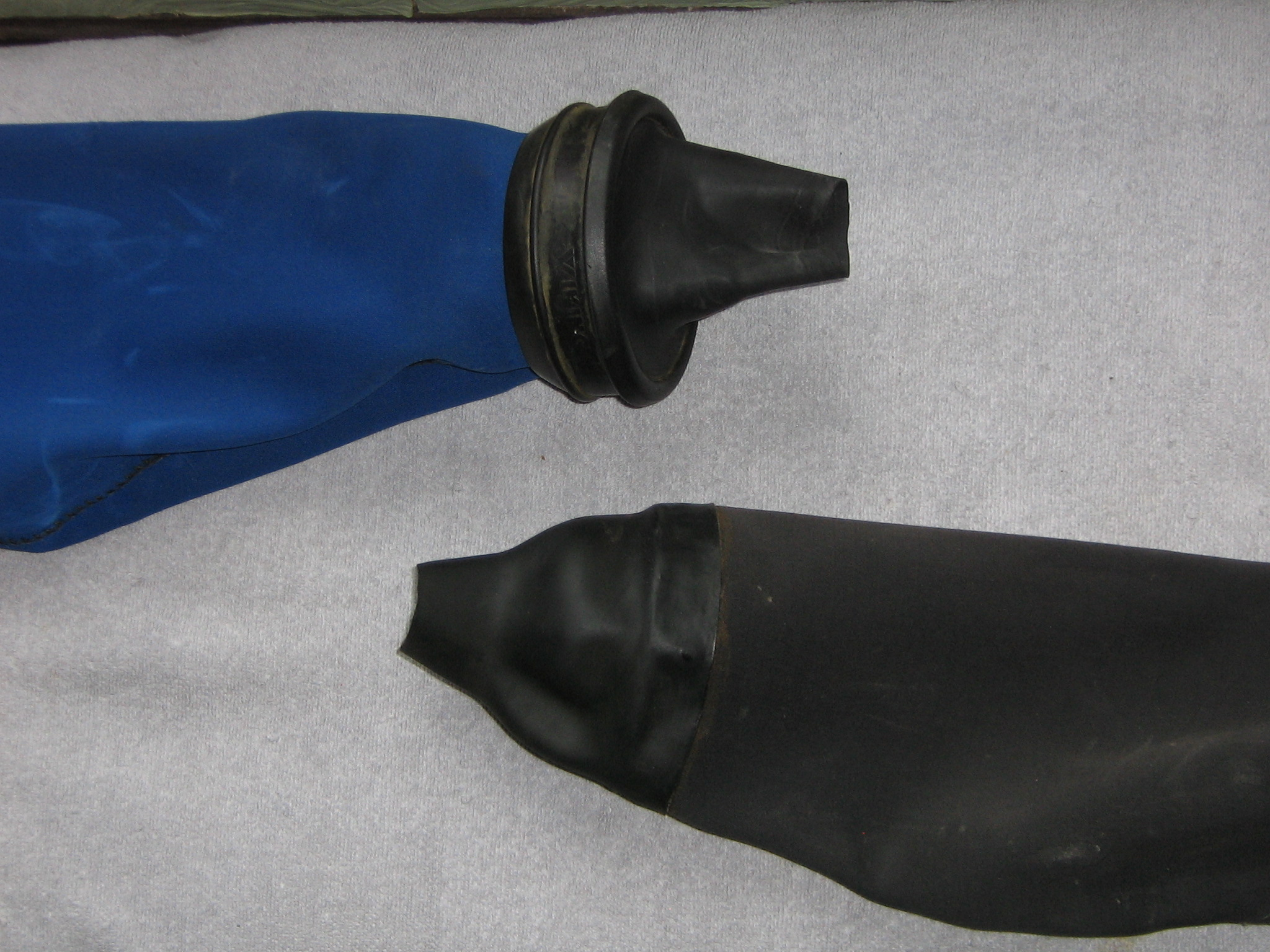
Dry suits with latex seals; Top: quick-change seal (Viking ring); Bottom: glued seal.

Attachment rings allow separate neck seals, gloves, and (less commonly) boots to be clipped to the suit with a watertight seal. On both commercial and recreational suits, "quick-change" rings have become common. These are glued to the suit, either during manufacture or as a retrofit. These systems form a watertight seal between the suit and components. Quick-change rings allow a diver to easily replace a damaged seal on the surface with no tools or adhesives, or to change attachments depending on conditions – for example, choosing between dry gloves and standard wrist seals. Different manufacturers' ring systems may be incompatible.

Some styles of cuff ring allow dry gloves to be clipped on over a wrist seal. A seal breaker strand is worn under the cuff seal to allow the interior of the glove to equalise with the sleeve of the dry suit. If the glove is damaged underwater, the strand can be removed to prevent further water leakage into the suit.

=== Suit inflation ===
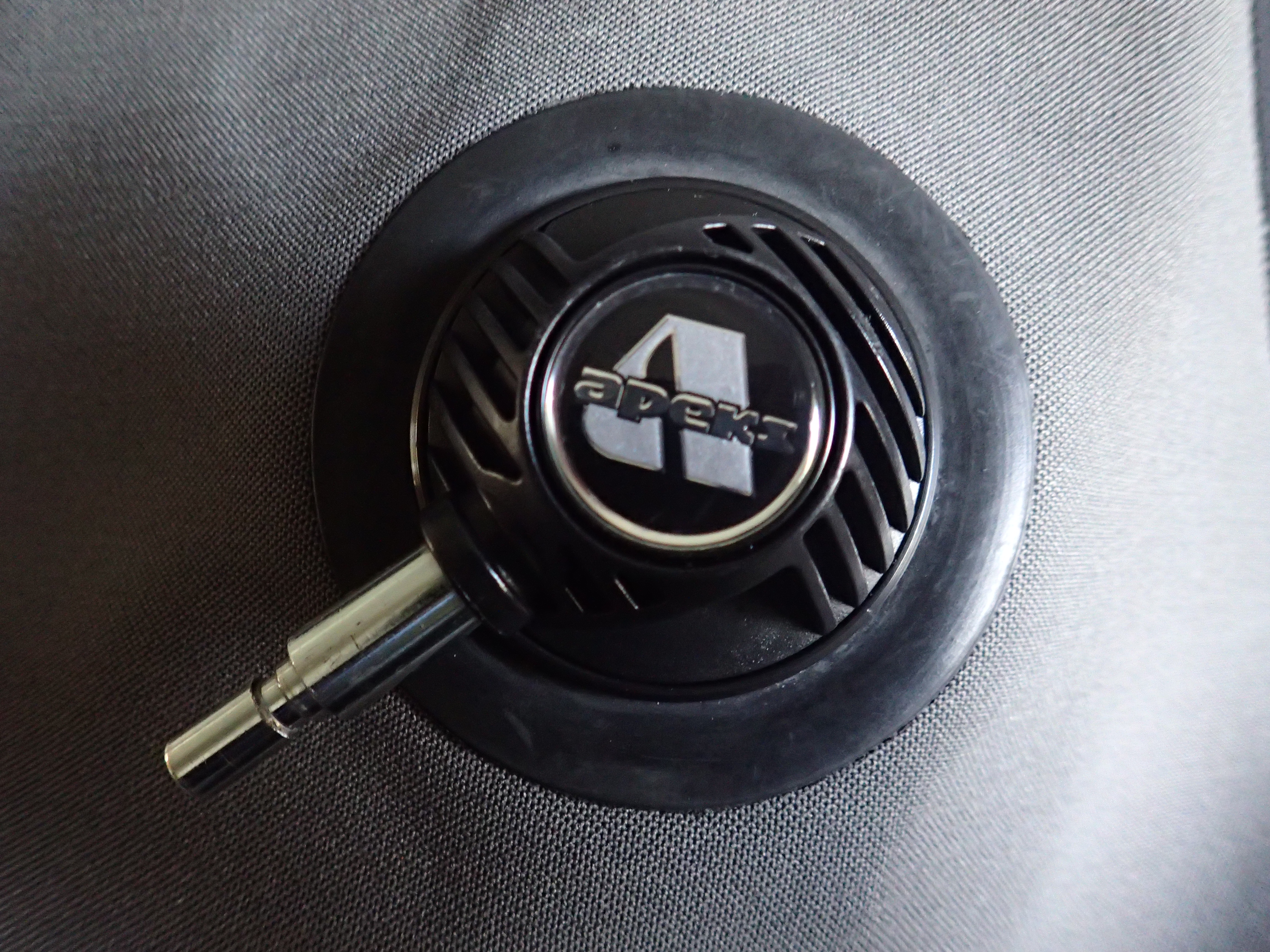
Inflation valve on neoprene suit

Dry suits for diving are usually equipped with an inflation valve (or inlet valve) and at least one exhaust valve (or dump valve, or outlet valve). Survival suits and other dry suits designed for wear on the surface have no inflation or dump valves as suit squeeze and achieving neutral buoyancy are not relevant. The inflation valve allows the diver to compensate for gas compression in the suit on descent. Suit gas compression squeezes the suit uncomfortably onto the diver's body, especially where the suit folds, it hinders the diver's freedom of movement, reduces thermal insulation through compression of insulating garments and interferes with buoyancy control. Environmentally sealed suits, which are sealed to the helmet, automatically equalise from the breathing gas, and will also inflate from the breathing gas if inverted.

==== Suit inflation gas supply ====
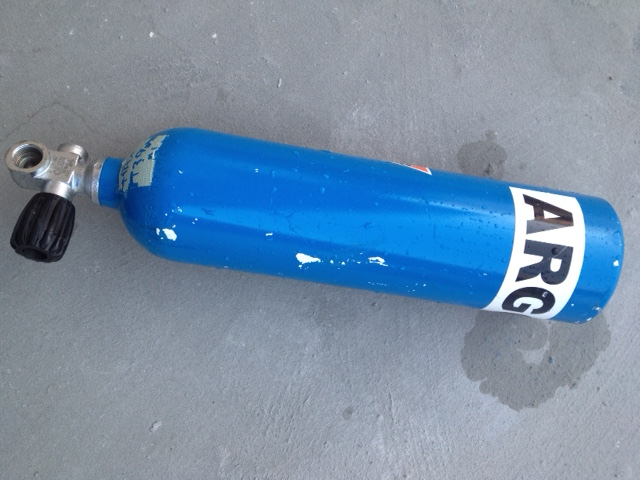
Aluminium cylinder and valve intended for argon at a maximum pressure of 139 bar to be used for the inflation of a dry suit while scuba diving

Compensating gas is supplied from a breathing gas cylinder, a small, dedicated suit inflation cylinder, or the umbilical of a surface-supplied diver. Normally, the gas used for dry suit inflation on scuba is air from the primary breathing cylinder. Helium-based gas mixes such as trimix or heliox are avoided for suit inflation because of helium's high thermal conductivity. Nitrox blends from a decompression cylinder have essentially the same thermal conductivity as air but oxygen rich mixes introduce a fire hazard when out of the water. Using a small (1-2 litre), dedicated cylinder for suit inflation avoids these complications; usually this will contain air but argon may be used instead. Argon has a low thermal conductivity, which improves insulation by approximately 20% compared to air, without adding any further bulk or weight. However, the accidental breathing of pure argon results in rapid unconsciousness and probable death. Consequently, argon cylinders must be clearly marked to prevent the accidental attachment of a breathing regulator or have valves that cannot accept a breathing regulator. To gain the full benefit of argon the suit must be flushed with argon before the dive to remove the air.

==== Inflation valve ====
An inflation valve is fitted to diving dry suits to admit gas to compensate for compression during descent. This is not necessary when the suit is sealed directly to a diving helmet, as the demand valve will automatically feed gas into the suit if the internal pressure difference drops. The spring-loaded push-button inflation valve is usually mounted over the chest for easy access, and is manually operated by the diver during descent to maintain the loft of the undergarments for insulation and to prevent discomfort from suit squeeze. Descent rate may also be adjusted by controlling suit volume and thereby buoyancy. Gas is supplied to the valve through a low-pressure hose, which can be connected and disconnected under pressure and underwater. Like the dump valves, most dry suits use inflation valves made by Apeks or SI Tech AB.

==== Inflation hose ====
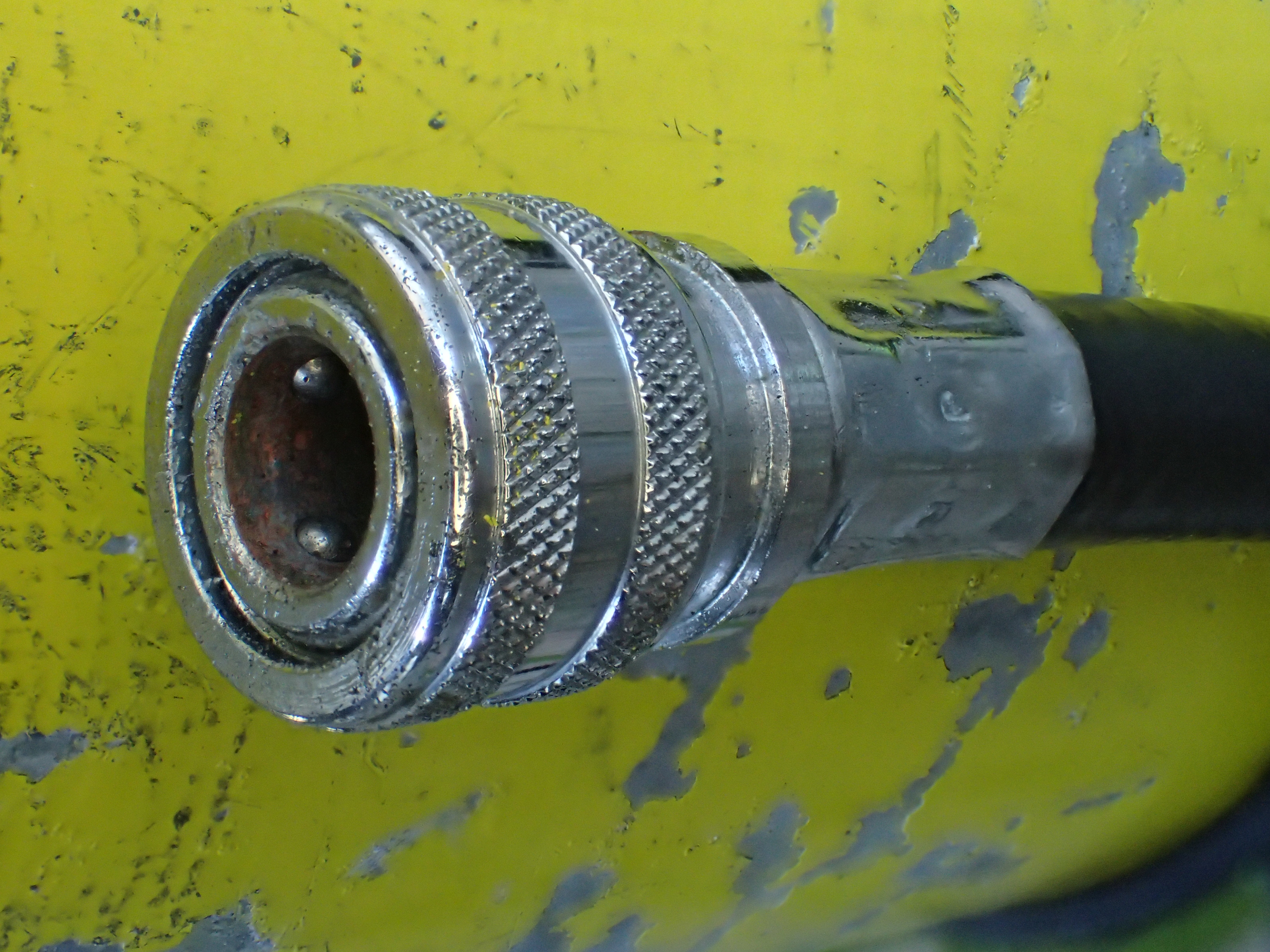
Seatec quick disconnect end fitting commonly used for most dry-suit and buoyancy compensator inflation

Low pressure inflation hose with CEJN connector (right) used for some dry suits

There are two types of low-pressure hose connections commonly used for suit inflation. These are the standard Seatec style quick release coupler, fitted with an internal Schrader valve, as also used on most diving buoyancy compensators, and the CEJN connector which allows a higher flow rate due to a larger bore through the non-return valve in the connector. This valve can allow a dangerously fast inflation rate if it jams open, and is also more likely to free-flow when disconnected. These hose connectors use incompatible valve fittings, but it is usually possible to swap the fitting on the inflator valve to accept the alternative hose end fitting. Both types of BCD and dry suit low pressure inflator hoses are supplied with a standard fitting for connection to a scuba regulator first stage low-pressure port.

=== Exhaust valves ===
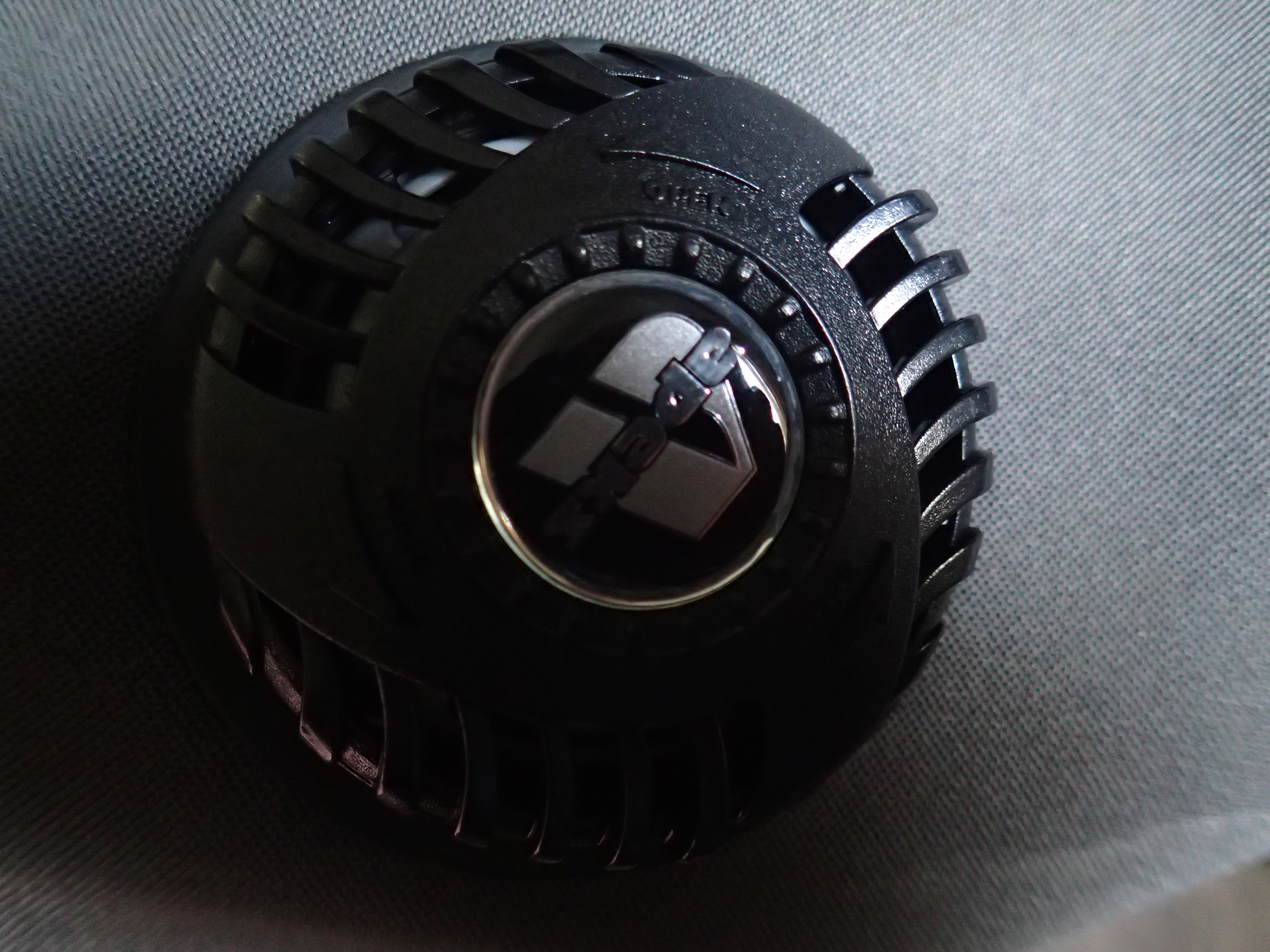
Auto-dump valve on neoprene suit

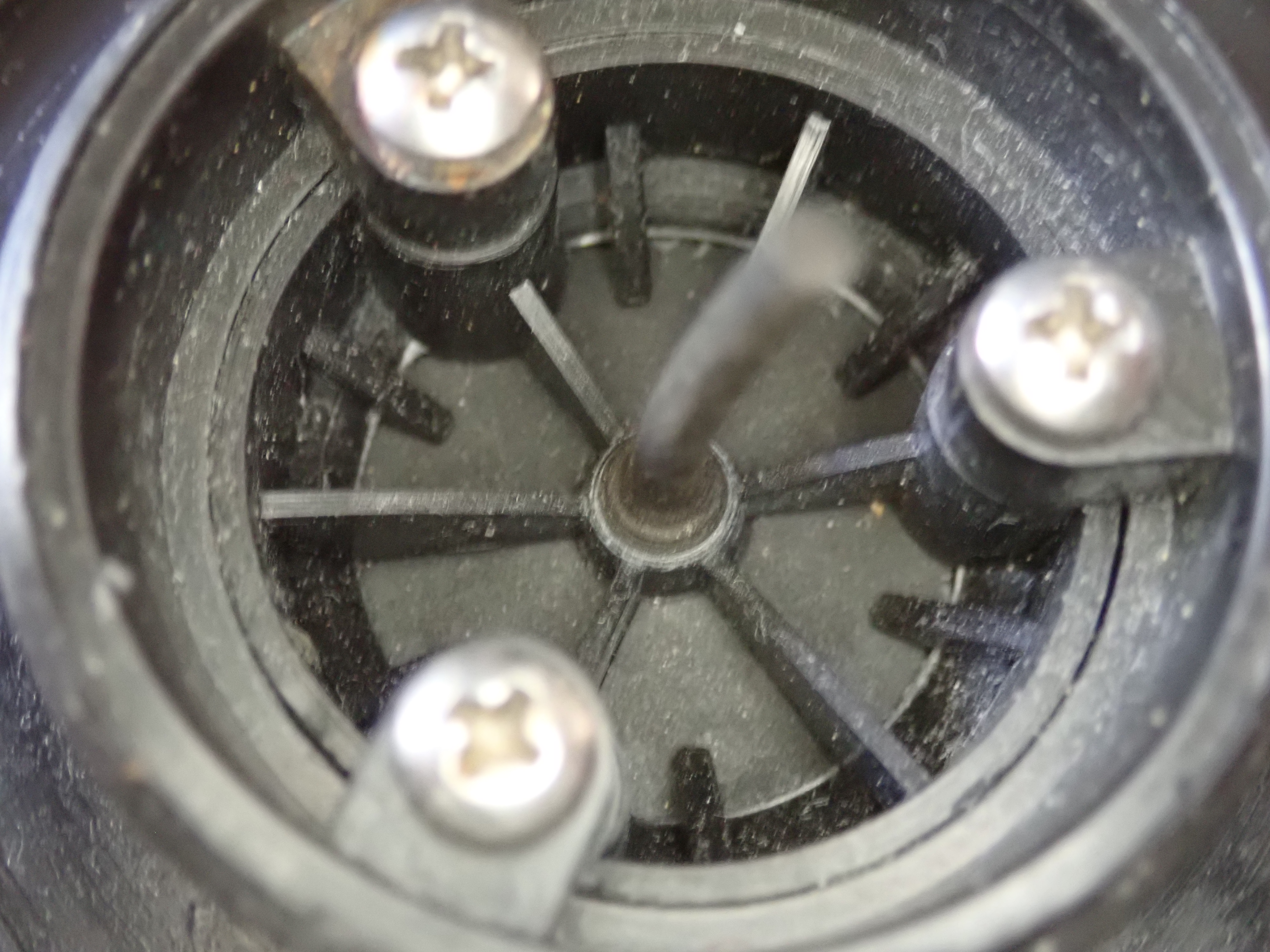
Internal view of automatic dump valve showing underside of rubber mushroom valve

The exhaust valve (or dump valve, often an auto-dump valve) allows the diver to vent expanding gas from the suit during ascent to maintain buoyancy control in the same way that a buoyancy compensator must be vented during ascent to avoid an uncontrolled (or runaway) buoyant ascent, missed decompression stops, decompression sickness, arterial gas embolism or pulmonary barotrauma. Configurations may vary but adjustable over-pressure automatic vents (auto-dump valves) are generally on the sleeve at the left shoulder, clear of the harness or buoyancy compensator, and non-adjustable over-pressure vents at the left wrist, where they can be raised quickly to dump, and occasionally also at the ankles, to automatically dump in the event of an inversion.

Adjustable valves can be pre-set or set to suit the undergarments during or after the descent, and in most situations can be left at this setting throughout the dive, but may be closed after surfacing to retain more gas for buoyancy and insulation, An auto-dump valve is a two stage valve to reduce inward leakage of water. The inner valve is generally a mushroom type elastomer non-return valve, with a low opening pressure differential, which will close automatically when there is no suit gas flowing out. This serves to prevent water ingress when the valve is manually opened by pressing down on the outer cover to compress the adjustable spring and open the pressure relief valve. The outer valve is an adjustable pressure relief valve which can be manually opened by pressing it with the hand against the spring preload, or opens automatically when internal pressure overcomes the preload setting. Spring tension is adjusted by screwing the outer cover further down to increase opening pressure difference, and unscrewing to reduce pressure difference. The rotation of the cover has stops at both ends, and clicks every few degrees of turn, so the user can judge the setting. Non-adjustable valves are similar but do not have the adjustment facility and can be more compact. Most dry suit dump valves are manufactured by Apeks and SI Tech and may be relabeled by suit manufacturers, though Northern Divers and Mares manufacture their own valves.The SI Tech valve has a different size gasket to the Apeks glued to the suit, so they are not interchangeable. Maintenance is mostly rinsing in fresh water after a dive, and most minor leaks can be fixed by soaking the valve mechanism and flushing with fresh water.

Environmentally sealed suits used for diving in contaminated water have a watertight seal to the helmet, rely on the helmet exhaust valve to release air from the suit, and may not have a separate exhaust valve on the suit itself. This is common for free-flow helmets and was part of the standard diving dress system.

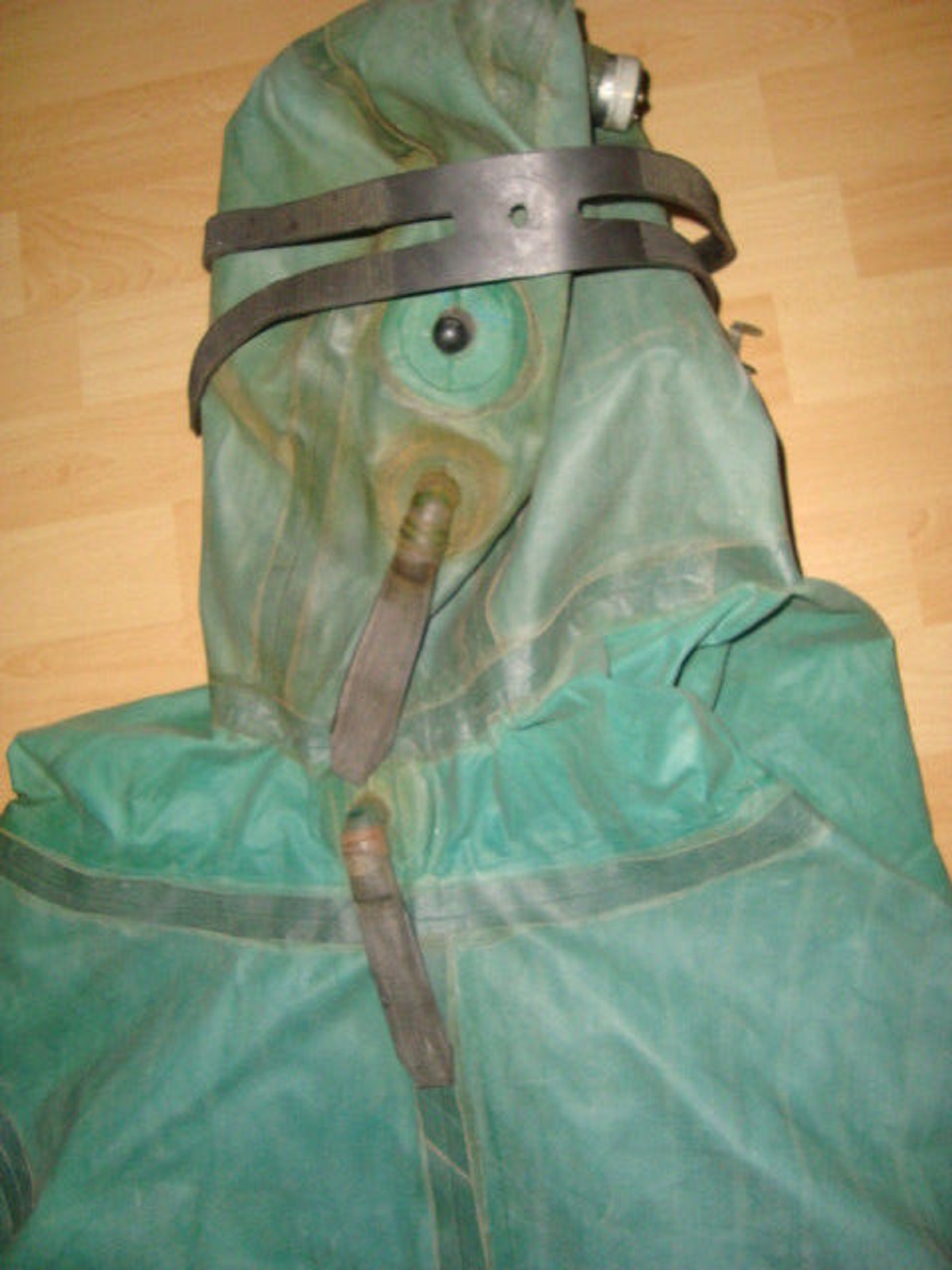
Duckbill valves attached to the hood and shoulders of a Soviet "GP" professional dry suit

Most, but not all, dry suits from the 1950s and the early 1960s came without dedicated vents; venting was achieved by raising an arm and lifting one of the wrist seals or placing a finger in the neck seal. Several manufacturers back then attached a rubber venting tube closed with a stopper to the chest area of valveless dry suits, enabling the latter to be completely deflated before entering the water or inflated in the water to make the suit buoyant if required. Some mid-twentieth-century divers installed duckbill valves, also known as spear valves or flutter valves, which were designed to release excess air from the interior of their otherwise valveless dry suits at the head, shoulders or ankles.

Surface-use dry suits do not normally have exhaust valves, but the wearer may vent excess air by crouching down and hugging the legs while slipping a finger under the neck seal.

During ascent, the diver has several things to monitor and do, so an adjustable automatic exhaust valve which provides hands-free operation helps reduce this task loading.

=== Zipper and seal protection ===
Some suits are provided with a flap which can be closed over the outside of the zipper to protect it from being damaged by contact with the diver's equipment or the environment. these flaps may be held in place by velcro or a non-watertight outer zipper. These flaps are almost always fitted to zippers fitted diagonally across the front of the suit, and less often to rear-entry cross-shoulder zippers.

Cuff and collar extensions to the shell may be fitted to protect the seals from abrasion and tears. This is particularly useful on suits used for activities like rescue, where the environment may be rough on the suit.

=== The P-valve ===
For commercial divers or technical divers who may spend many hours in a dry suit underwater, it is not practical to have to climb back on board the ship in order to open a waterproof relief zipper and urinate. The P-valve is a urinal built into the suit, which enables a diver to urinate at any time without having to get out of the water, while keeping him or her dry and clean inside the suit. Risks involved with the use of the P-valve can include urinary tract infection, pneumaturia and genital squeeze. Divers expecting the need to urinate in dry suits can also use an adult diaper, which soaks up and retains the urine. Watertight relief zippers may be fitted which allow urination when out of the water without removing the suit. but these are a potential source of leaks and an additional expense.

=== Cargo pockets ===
Pockets are a convenient storage for small items of equipment and tools that may be needed on a dive, or on surface dry suits, during work. They are often used by scuba divers who use back inflation buoyancy control devices without integral pockets, and are often simply glued to the suit in the position chosen by the diver. Various styles and capacities are used. The usual positions are on the thighs. Forward position is more ambidextrously accessible, but can make boarding a small boat over the gunwale difficult or impossible, the sides of the thighs is more streamlined and better for boat entry, but makes it difficult to reach into the pocket with the opposite hand. Chest pockets are also sometimes used. Pockets may alternatively be mounted on shorts, a tunic, or protective overalls worn over the dry suit, or be integral parts of the buoyancy compensator. They usually cause additional drag underwater, and should drain rapidly while climbing out of the water.

=== "Bio-seals" ===
To reduce the contact with latex seals in divers with a latex allergy, a soft elastomer band called a "Bio-seal" can be worn under the latex contact area. These may also reduce friction with the seal and improve watertightness.

=== Active heating ===
For applications where passive heating is insufficient, active heating can be used. One of the earliest systems was the tube suit, a set of underwear with a complicated labyrinth of tubes which carried heated water supplied from the surface or the lockout submersible through an additional hose in the diver's umbilical. Other active heating systems use electrical heating elements in an undersuit layer, or internal pockets containing hot-packs, sealed plastic bags containing materials which emit latent heat during a phase change.

== Associated equipment ==
Some equipment may require modification to suit use with a dry suit. This is particularly relevant for weighting systems and buoyancy control devices.

=== Weighting systems ===
Weight harnesses with shoulder straps have advantages over standard scuba weight belts, as they are more secure and more suited to supporting the larger mass often required to ballast a dry suit system, are less likely to cause lower back or hip pain and are less likely to slide of over the hips of divers with larger waists. Integrated weight systems in buoyancy compensators are not always able to contain the required weights.

==== Gaiters, ankle straps and ankle weights ====
The internal volume necessary in trouser legs to allow passage of the feet to the boots can hold a large volume of air when inverted, which may pull the boots off the feet. Both the accumulation of gas in this part of the suit and the inability to fin put the diver at severe risk of uncontrollable buoyant ascent. Elastic or tailored "gaiters" can be pulled snug around the lower legs to reduce the potential airspace to help prevent an inversion event and help maintain horizontal trim. Gaiters may also reduce hydrodynamic drag when finning, reduce the risk of the feet pulling out of the boots when inverted, and can be used effectively on membrane and neoprene suits. Ankle straps perform a similar function, but are less effective at restricting the volume around the lower leg. Small ankle-weights, typically 0.5 to 1 kg (one or two pounds) can also be used with any dry suit, both to provide trim weight at the bottom of the suit, and function as ankle straps. Ankle-weights have to be accelerated along with the fins during every kick, which requires more work from the diver. Gaiters do not have this drawback as they are typically very light and approximately neutral buoyancy, and usually reduce the drag of the lower leg. The heavy standard diving dress dry suit tended to be a very loose fit and had optional lacing at the back of the legs for this purpose.

=== Buoyancy compensators ===
The use of buoyancy compensators (BCs) for diving with dry suits is required by some organisations as they provide secure flotation in the event of catastrophic flooding of the suit. Large volumes of gas in the suit can also put pressure on the neck, or vent through the neck seal, which could cause a sudden loss of buoyancy, water ingress, or both. The BC is used to compensate for mass change due to consumption of breathing gas, while the dry suit is kept at a near constant volume to optimise thermal insulation. The BC must not obstruct free access to the inflation valve, which is usually on the chest, or the shoulder dump valve.

=== Overalls ===
Boilersuit style protective wear may be worn over the dry suit to protect it from environmental damage. This is most commonly done by commercial and military divers working in a harsh environment where the suit is exposed to sharp points or edges, or abrasive surfaces, or is likely to be contaminated on the surface by materials which can be warded off by the cheaper and relatively disposable protective clothing overlay.

== Applications ==
Use of dry suits can conveniently be divided into underwater and surface applications, as the construction of the suit may be optimized for either.

=== Underwater ===
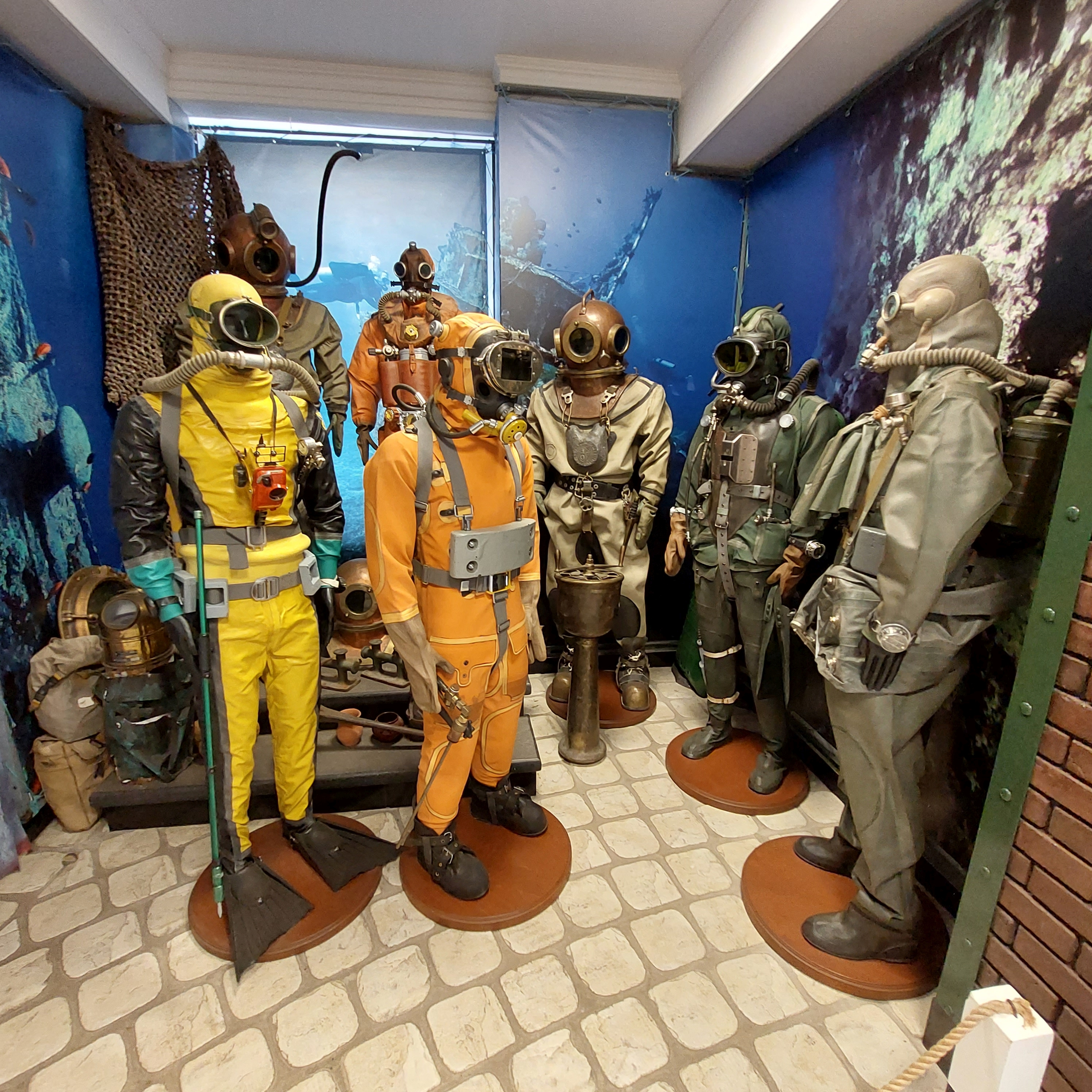
A museum display of diving dry suits with different breathing apparatus configurations

Dry suits are typically used where the water temperature is below 15 °C (60 °F), and for extended immersion in water above 15 °C (60 °F), where discomfort and a greater risk of hypothermia would be experienced by a wet suit user. They are also used with integral boots, and gloves and sealed to the helmet for personal protection when working in and around hazardous liquids regardless of temperature.

==== Recreational diving ====
Dry suits for recreational diving are made in both membrane and neoprene materials, and primarily differ from surface dry suits in that they have inflation and deflation air valves to maintain neutral buoyancy, and may be more durable in construction and a closer fit.

==== Professional diving ====
Dry suits for commercial and military diving tend to be heavier and more durable than recreational diving dry suits because they are more likely to endure a harsh and abrasive environment, especially if being used for heavy labor such as underwater welding. A boiler suit may be worn over the dry suit for protection of the suit. Some commercial dry suits are rated for contaminated environment diving, and when combined with a suitably rated diving helmet can completely isolate and protect the diver from hazardous environments such as sewage pits and chemical storage tanks. These "hazmat diving suits" are most often made of vulcanized rubber with a cloth liner, which is easier to decontaminate than other dry suit materials because of its slick surface.

=== Surface ===
Surface use may include partial immersion or even shallow complete immersion for short periods. These applications do not require fine control of buoyancy under varying pressure, and a simpler suit without inflation and dump valves is usually adequate. Aspects considered in selection may include initial cost, suitability for purpose, ease of use, and maintenance cost and effort.

==== Aquaculture ====
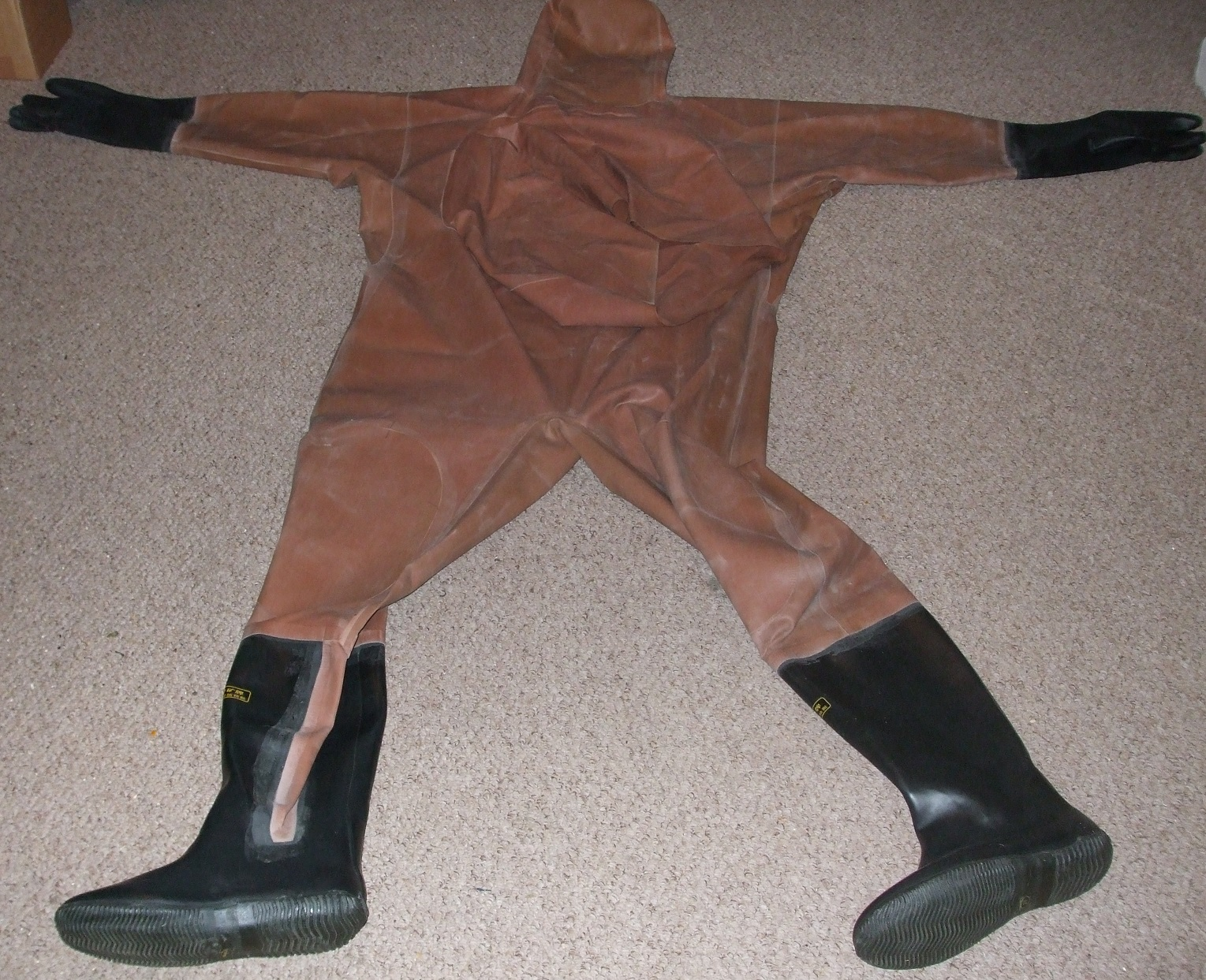
Chinese-made full-body chest-entry dry wading suit with attached boots, gloves and hood with uncut face opening.

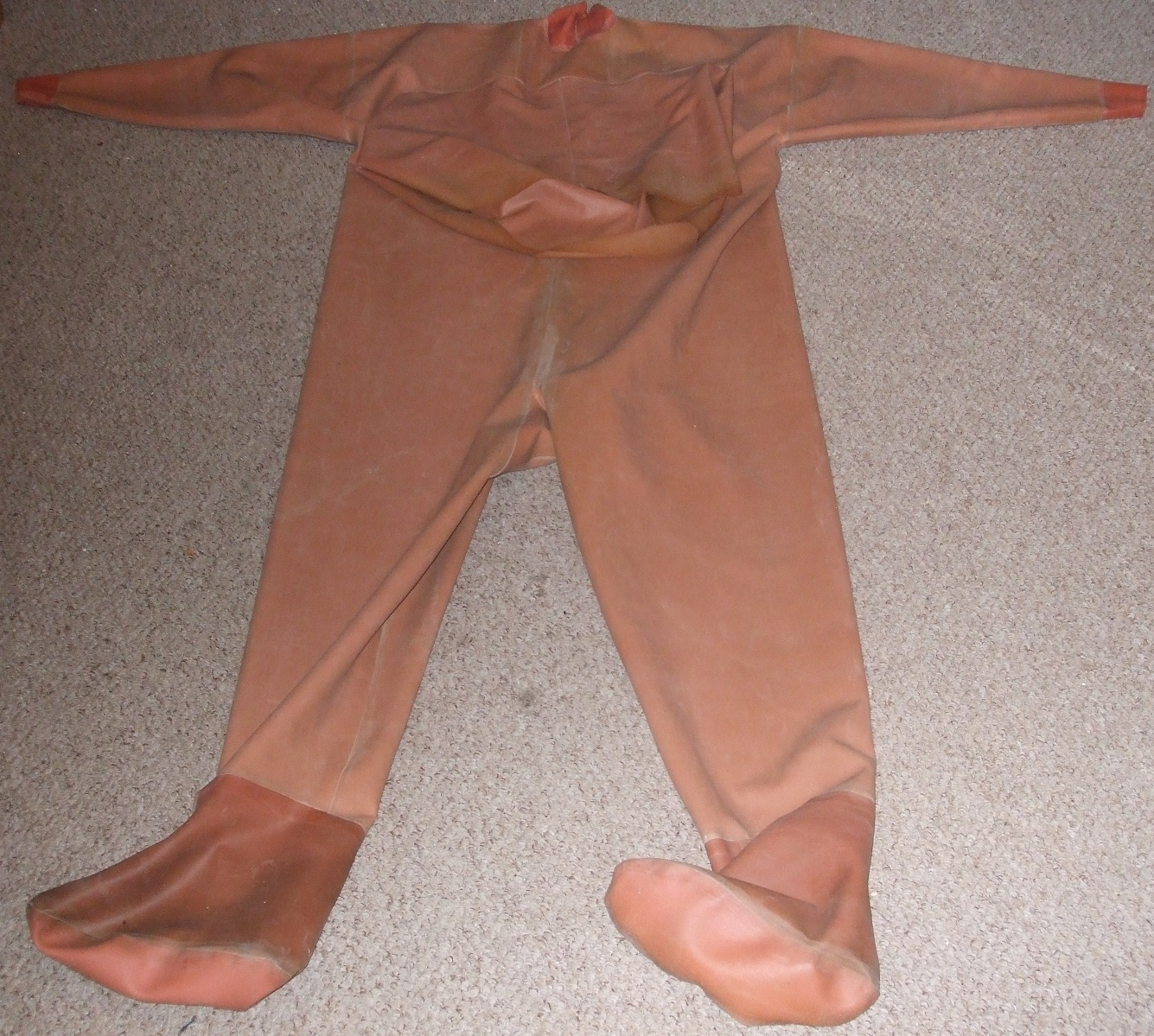
Chinese-made full-body chest-entry dry wading suit with attached socks, wrist seals and neck seal.

Full-body chest-entry dry suits for wading purposes are worn by aquaculture workers and fishermen in China. They are fitted with a pair of boots or socks for the feet, wrist seals or a pair of gloves for the hands and a neck seal or integral hood for the head. Suits with boots enable the wearer to stand or walk in deeper water, while suits with socks enable the user to don swimming fins for float-tube fishing. Entry is via the suit chest aperture, which comes with excess material on the outside to be tied off afterwards for a leak-tight seal. Some versions use a watertight zip fastener instead to close the front entry.

==== Boating ====
Dry suits are often worn for boating, especially sailing, and on personal watercraft in the winter months. The primary uses are for protection from spray, and in case of accidental short-term immersion in cold water if the user falls overboard. These dry suits, which are only intended for temporary immersion, are less rugged than diving dry suits. They are usually made of a breathable membrane material to let sweat vapour permeate, keeping the wearer dry and comfortable all day. Membrane type surface dry suits only keep the user dry, and have little thermal insulating properties. Users will wear a thermal undersuit, or sportswear for warmth, but most fabrics will lose much of their insulating properties if the suit leaks in cold water.

==== Surface water sports ====
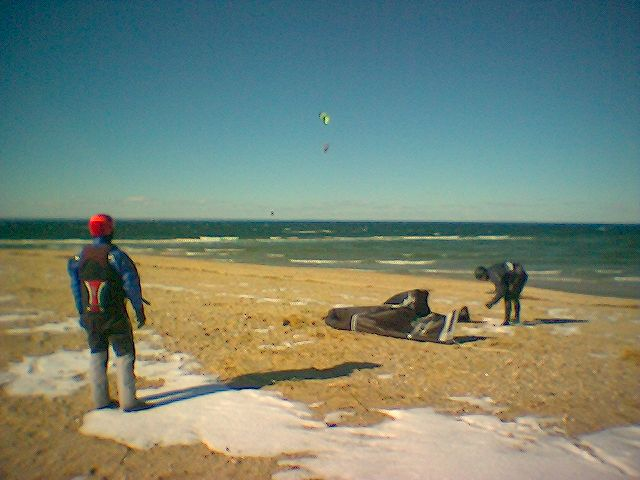
Kitesurfers wearing dry suits on Long Island in winter when the air and water temperatures are near 0 °C (32 °F)

Dry suits are used for windsurfing, kitesurfing, kayaking, water skiing and other surface water sports where the user is frequently immersed in cold water. These suits are often made from very lightweight material for minimum encumbrance. Membrane type suits are commonly used with moderate water temperatures, but neoprene and hybrid dry suits for surface sports are preferred in cold water, as they provide greater thermal protection in the event of a leak. Suits for kayaking may have an overlap for the spray deck (skirt) and suits for surfing, kiteboarding and other standing sports may have ankle cuff seals instead of boots or socks, allowing the user a wider choice of specialised footwear. The ability to swim for self-rescue in these types of suits is important to water sports users that do not use a boat.

Short suits with bicep and thigh cuff seals are also available, and are useful when it is mainly necessary to keep the torso dry.

==== Working ====
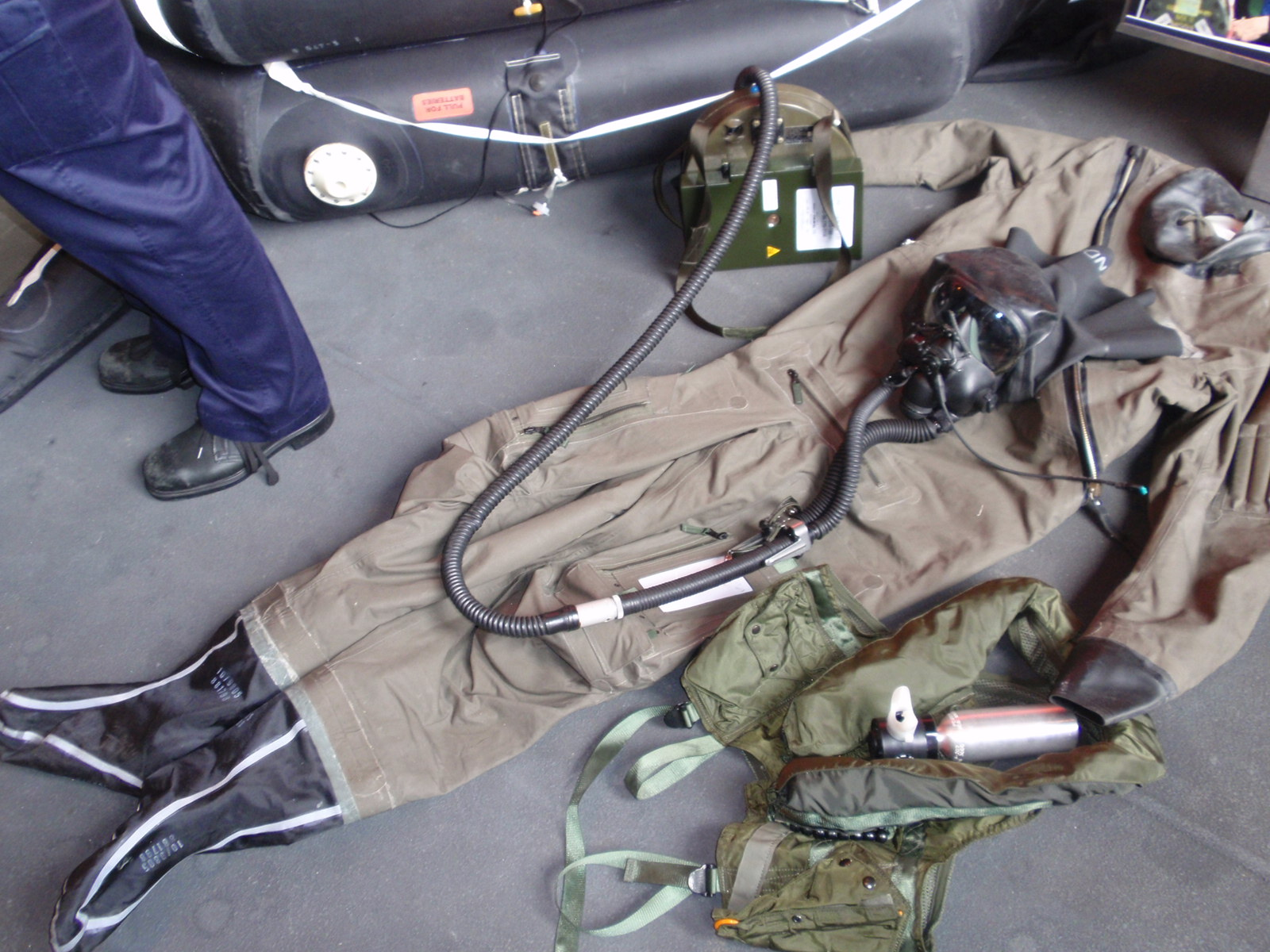
Naval aircrew immersion flight suit

Crew members who must work on the decks of commercial ships wear a type of dry suit also known as an immersion work suit. Single engine aircraft ferry pilots flying between North America and Europe, and helicopter pilots that must fly over the open ocean, must wear a survival suit in the cockpit, so they can continue to fly the aircraft until impact, then exit immediately if the aircraft is ditched in cold water after an engine failure. These suits are also used on shore when working on docks, bridges, or other areas where cold water immersion is a safety risk. They are usually a three-part system consisting of:

- A warm undersuit made of synthetic fabric designed to wick moisture from sweat generated by physical exertion away from the user's skin.
- A dry suit made with a waterproof breathable membrane to let moisture vapour permeate out of the suit when not immersed.
- A durable outer shell, designed to protect the dry suit, and to carry tools and survival gear. The outer shell may also be equipped with an inflatable bladder to give the wearer additional flotation and stability when immersed.

==== Survival ====
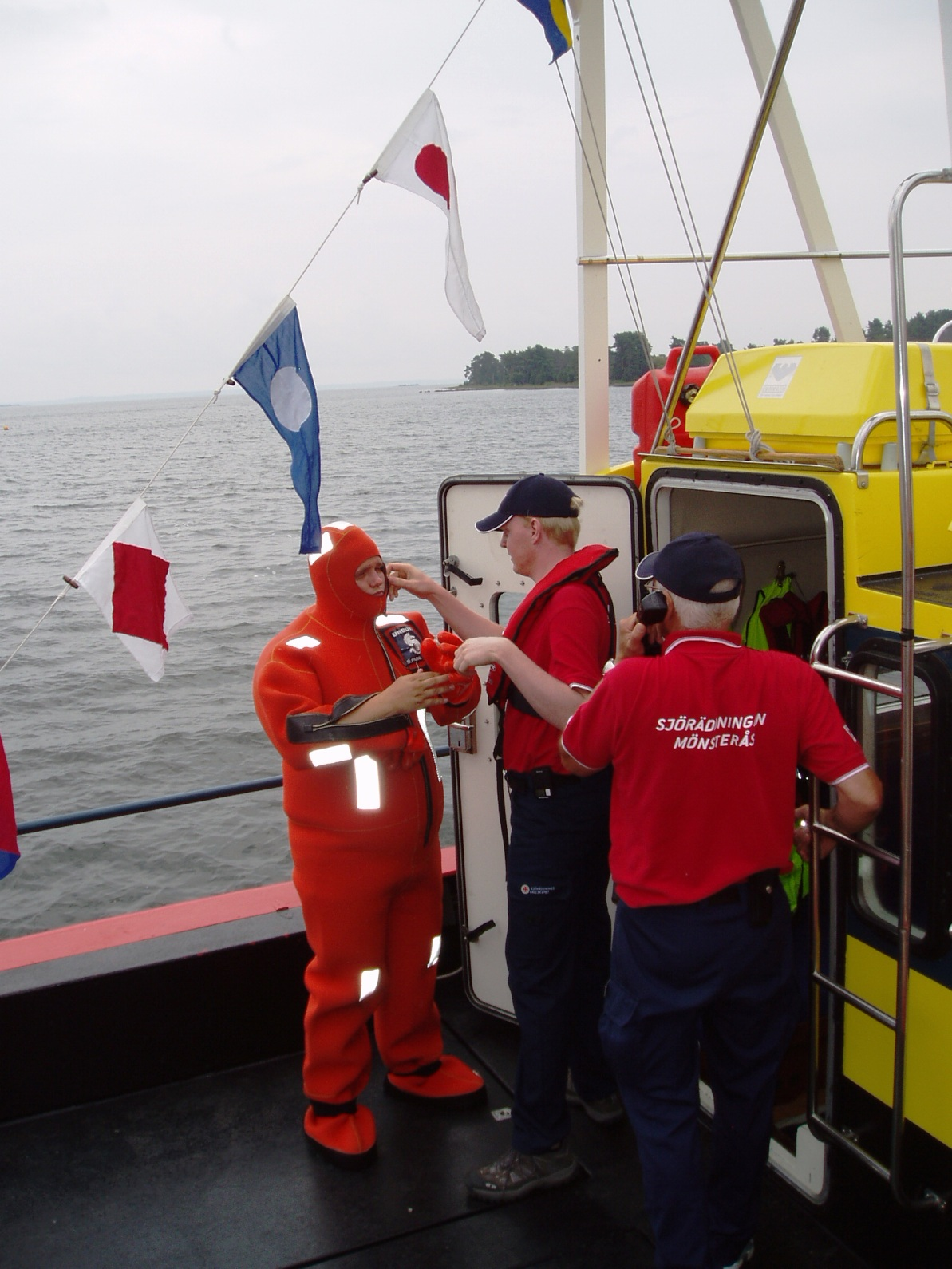
Survival suit

Immersion survival suits are dry suits carried for use by ship and aircraft crew who will be immersed in cold water if the craft must be abandoned. Unlike immersion survival work suits, these are not intended to be worn routinely for long periods, and are only intended to be used in an emergency. Survival suits will typically be a one-piece design made of fire-retardant neoprene, optimized with quick donning features, and produced in high visibility colours with reflective tape patches.

Immersion suits protect the wearer from cold shock and delay hypothermia by reducing heat loss. Other functions include providing buoyancy and increasing visibility to rescuers. They must allow sufficient freedom of movement to perform necessary actions. There are two basic types: Suits for emergency abandonment, and suits intended to be worn over long work periods where the risk of immersion is relatively high, or there may be no opportunity to put the suit on in the event of an emergency. The size range that must be available for marine abandonment immersion suits is specified by CAN/CGSB-65.16-2005 and other standards, and may include children, small adults, universal, jumbo, and custom sizes. ISO 15027, Canadian General Standards Board (CAN/CGSB-65.16-2005), and Safety of Life at Sea (SOLAS) immersion suit standards, as well as others, apply.

A survival suit for protecting survivors of a helicopter ditching incident is also known as a helicopter transportation suit (HTS). A ditched helicopter may invert immediately after impact, and the suit must facilitate underwater escape, which requires minimal buoyancy until the survivor is outside the ditched helicopter. Once outside, and clear of the wreckage, the suit must provide buoyancy, protection from drowning, and thermal protection while immersed. During normal flight operations the suit must be acceptably comfortable. Except for the underwater egress these requirements are very similar to those for other survival suits.

Helicopter transportation suits are constant wear immersion suits that are required for crew and passengers during operations over cold water. Aircrew and passenger HTS typically differ as pilots must not be encumbered while busy flying, generate more heat due to activity in flight, and are often heated by sunlight through the cockpit glazing.

==== Rescue ====
Dry suits are also worn by rescue personnel who must enter, or may accidentally enter, cold water. Features of dry suits designed for rescue may be a hybrid of the immersion survival and work suits, since the wearer is not expected to be working in the suit for an extended time. They may also be optimized for a specific task such as ice rescue, swift water rescue, or helicopter rescue swimmer.

Lightweight suits of breathable shell fabric which are easy to don, comfortable, strong, seals which can be trimmed to custom fit, and bootees that are easy to don and not bulky in the outer boot are desirable characteristics. Durable materials with reinforcement and padding on the knees, elbows and seat improve the useful life of the suit. High visibility colours and reflective tape which can be seen while wearing a personal flotation device are appropriate for this use case. Adjustable internal suspenders, belts and thigh straps allow better adjustment of fit to the individual, and well drained pockets in convenient locations and relief zippers are useful in the field. Low drag in the water can be valuable in some use cases.

== Manufacture ==
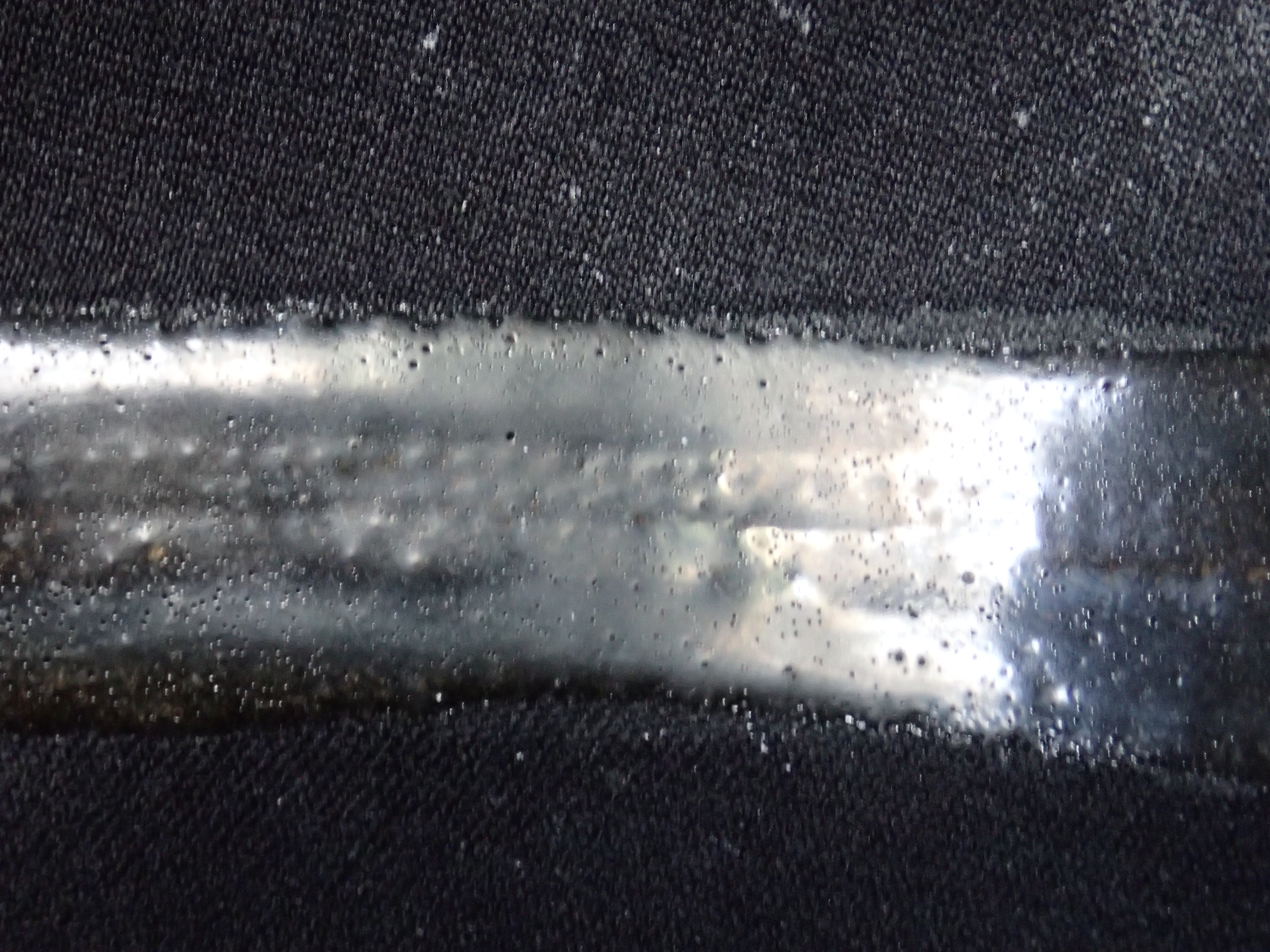
DUI crushed neoprene dry suit seam waterproofing detail

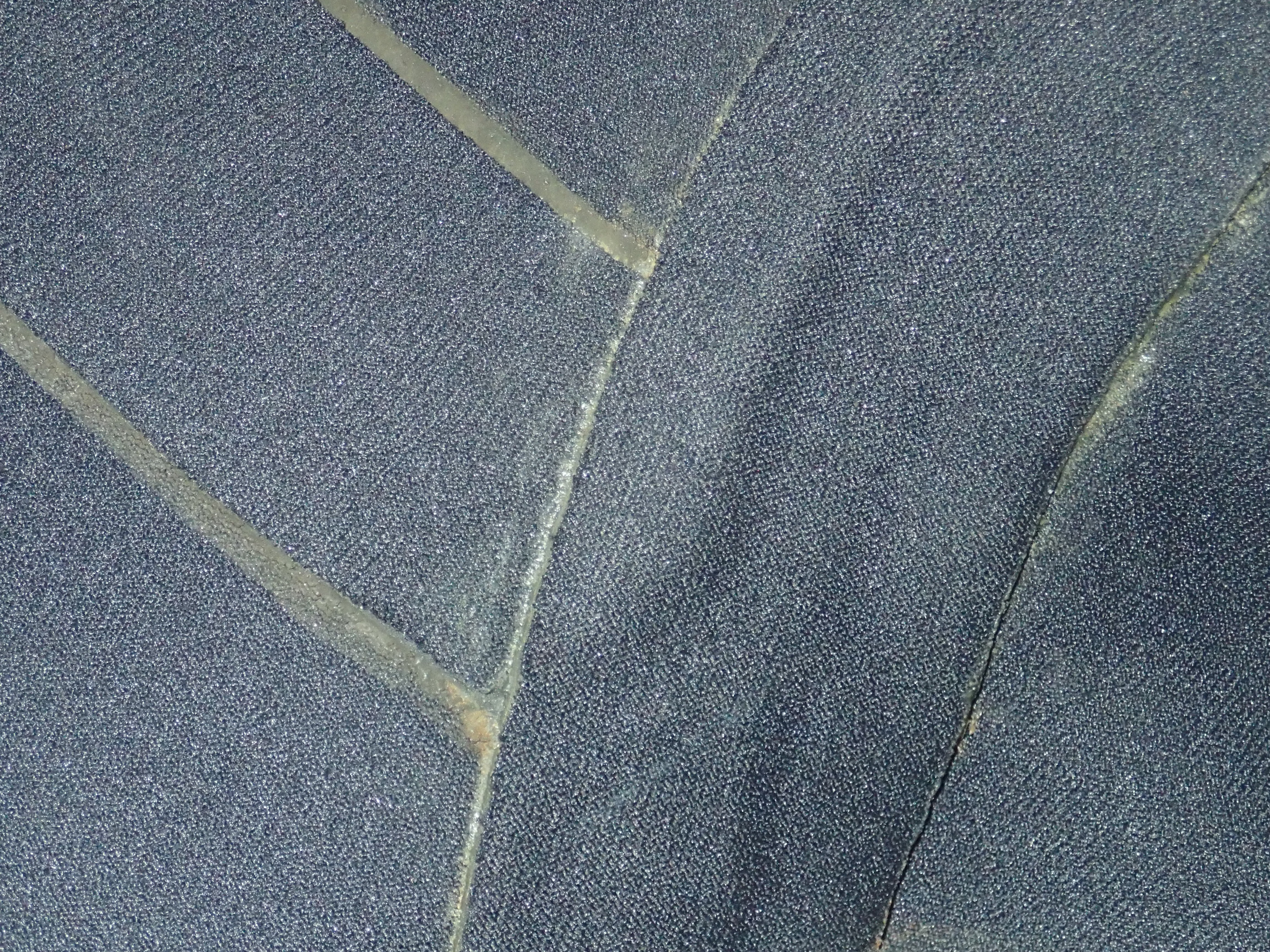
Neoprene dry suit glued and stitched seam with inside seam tape detail

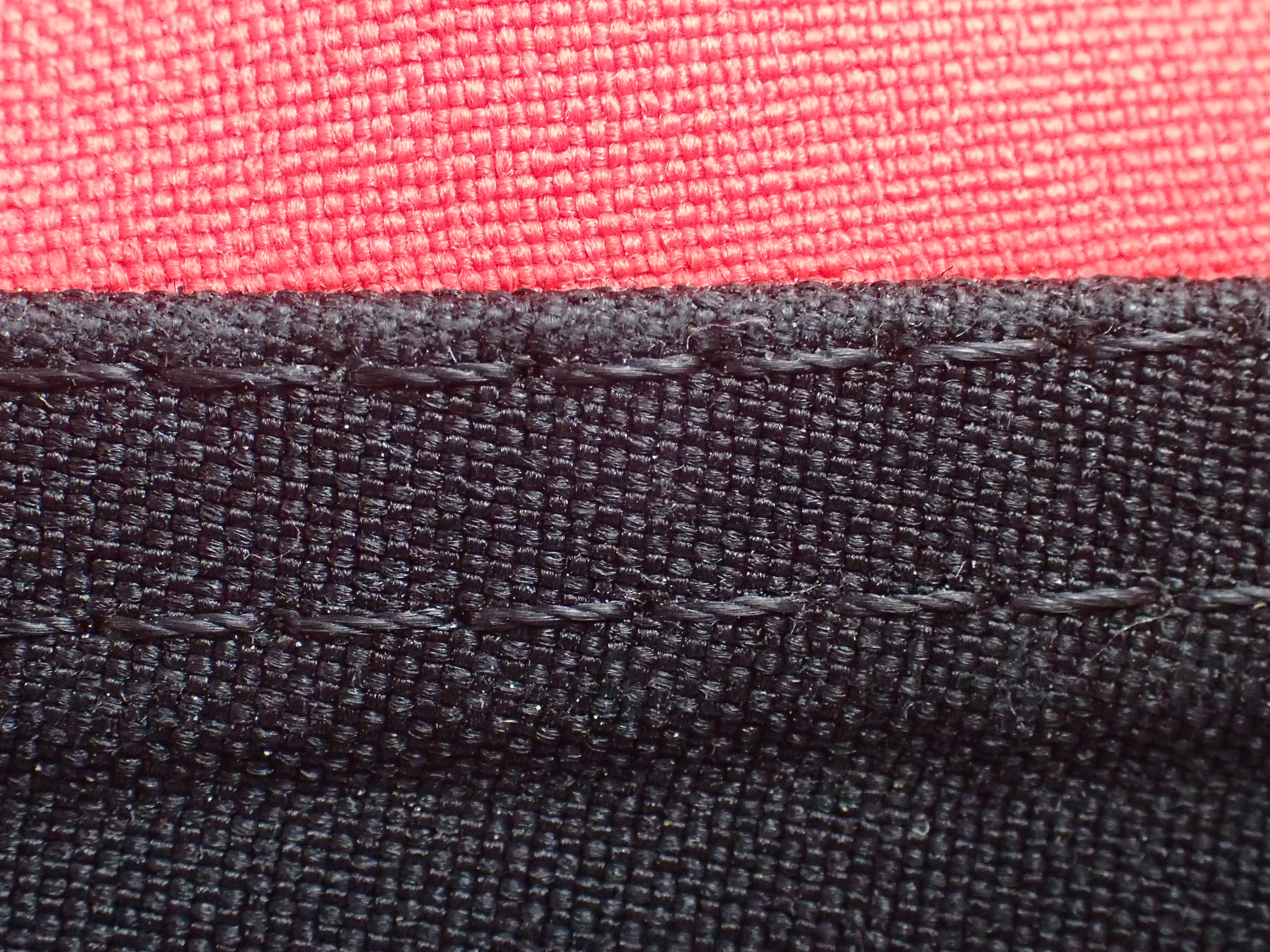
Seam detail on trilaminate dry suit showing double-stitched seam from the outside.

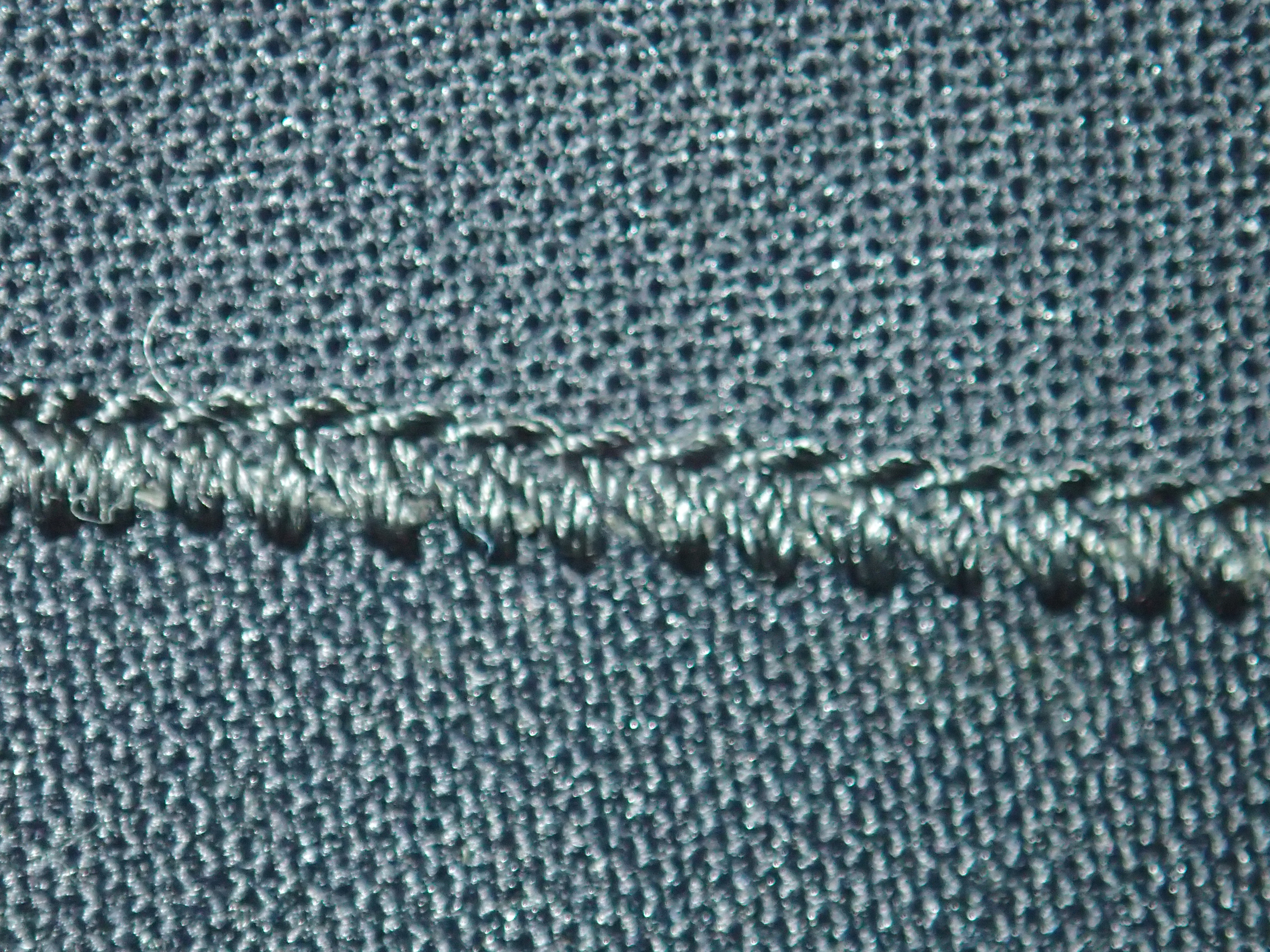
Neoprene dry suit seam outside stitching detail

Manufacturing processes mainly depend on the material of the shell. Most suit shells are currently assembled by stitching the seams, which in the case of neoprene suits are first butt-glued, and are then overlock blind-stitched and waterproofed by glued seam tape. DUI use a liquid polyurethane sealing compound over the seams on the inside of the suit instead of tape, DUI crushed neoprene suit shells are assembled before crushing the bubbles by hydrostatic pressure, then adding seals, zippers and accessories.

Polyurethane coated nylon and trilaminate suits are usually assembled using double stitched seams for strength, which are then taped on the inside for watertightness.

Vulcanised rubber dry suits are made from a rubber coated knitted fabric, stitched together along the seams to hold them together during the vulcanising process. Once the suit has been assembled, it is stretched over an aluminium mandrel in the shape and size of the finished suit. When the suit is on the mandrel, the seams are taped with strips of the same rubber, but without the liner cloth, then bonded together with heat and pressure in an autoclave, which vulcanises the rubber of the suit and seam tape into a homogeneous layer which is very reliably watertight. Any customising of the suit is done after this process, and requires cutting and gluing and taping of additional seams, which are generally not as reliable and strong as the original structure The thickness of the rubber layer can be varied and patches added for abrasion resistance. Vulcanised rubber suits can also be made using rubber coated fabric that has already been vulcanised, assembled in much the same way as trilaminate suits, and the seams taped after assembly. This is more versatile for customising, but the seam quality is not as reliable as the method of vulcanising the assembled suit and seam tape together. The combination of high stretch rubber over stretchy knitted fabric makes these suits very flexible and elastic, so a baggy cut is not needed. However, the mandrels are expensive, so a limited number of standard sizes are available.

Seals, zippers, boots, pockets, and other accessories, are usually glued on to the shell after assembly, and joins and edges may be reinforced by seam tape in high stress areas or to improve watertightness. Some abrasion reinforcement and logos are bonded or stitched to the suit or printed onto the component panels before or after assembly.

== Inherent weaknesses ==
Some components are inherently susceptible to damage if not treated with due care.

=== Seal damage ===
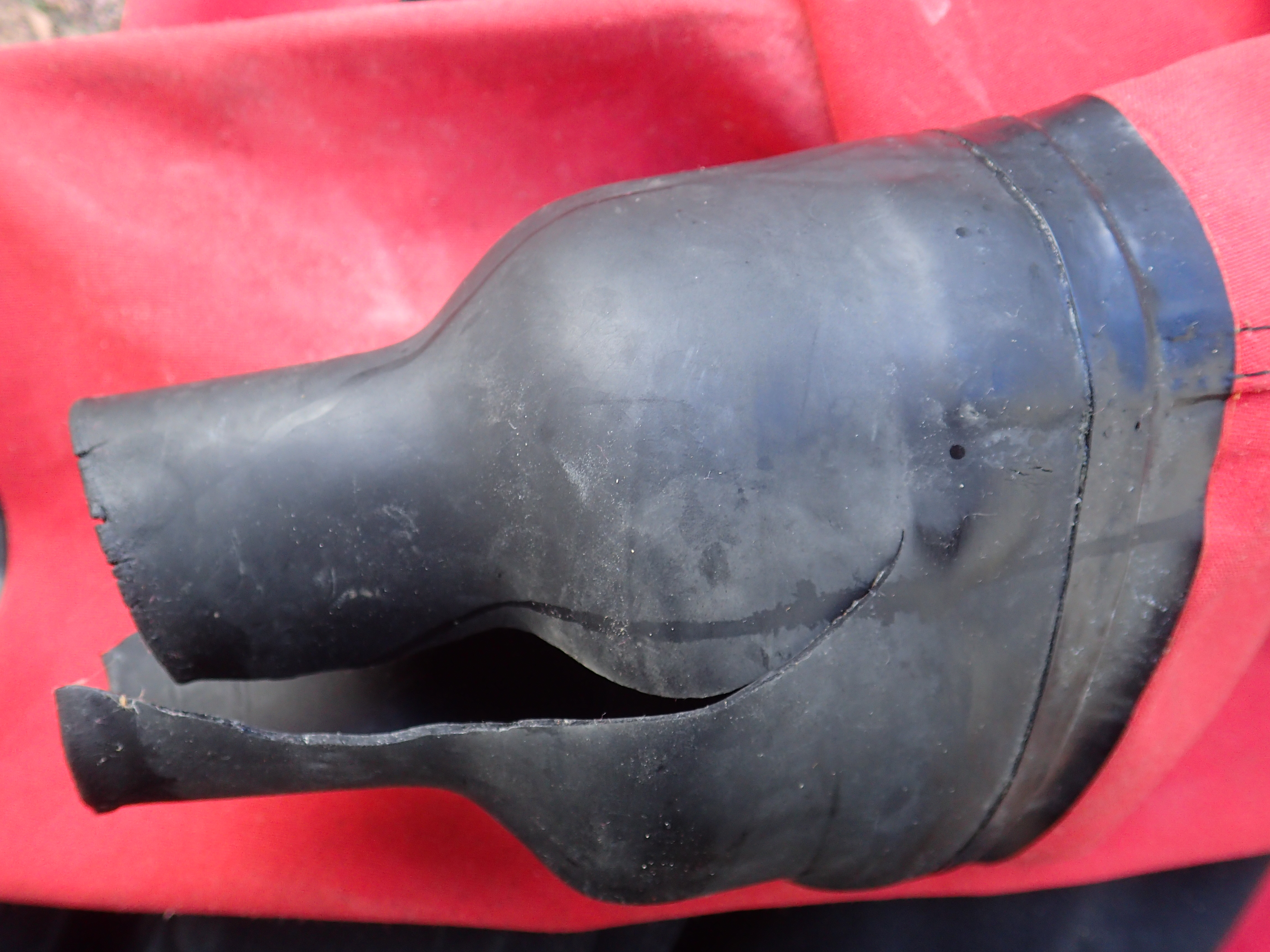
Torn latex rubber dry suit wrist seal

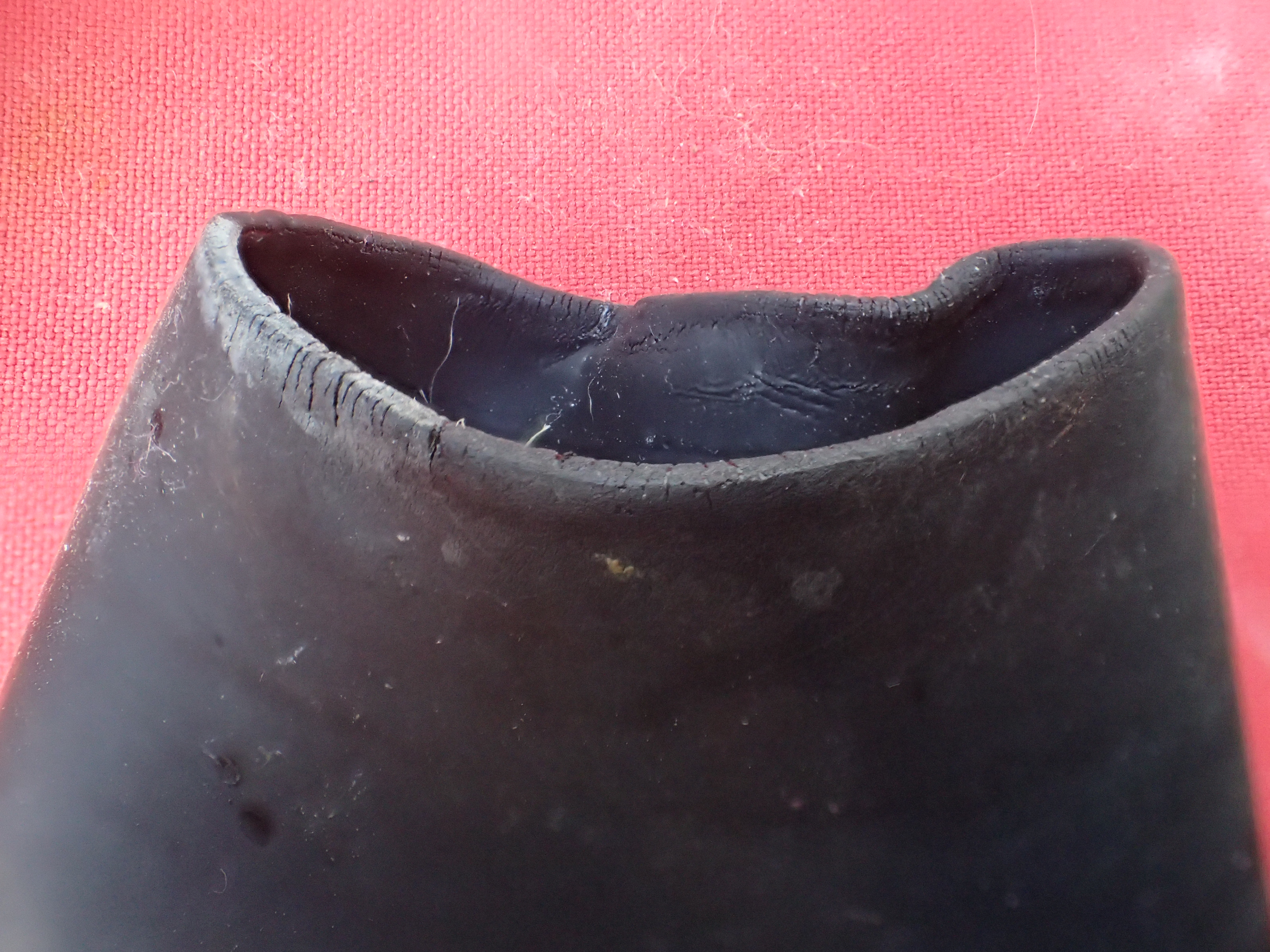
Cracking of latex rubber dry suit wrist seal

Latex and silicone seals are easily pierced by sharp objects. Gripping the seal with long fingernails to pull it on or off can cut through the material, while long toenails can damage thin rubber booties when the foot is pushed inside tight-fitting fins.

Latex is subject to rubber perishing, or "dry rot", where ozone normally present in the air deteriorates the material over time, regardless of use. A latex seal is generally expected to last 1–2 years. The useful life can be extended by detaching removable seals when not in use and keeping them in airtight containers in a cool, dark environment. Silicone seals are similar in strength and elasticity to latex, but are more chemical resistant and do not perish in the same way. Latex and silicone seals are highly elastic, but can be easily torn if overstretched or nicked on an edge to form a stress raiser. Powdered talc can help the seals slide on easier.

Neoprene seals are a tougher and more tear resistant alternative, though they must be correctly sized for the user, as they cannot be adjusted much. These are much more resistant to perishing than latex, and the knit fabric backing helps redistribute concentrated loads and thereby reduces the risk of major tears. Minor tears are usually repairable. A lubricating liquid such as dishwashing liquid or KY jelly can be used to facilitate for donning and removing neoprene wrist seals.

=== Zipper damage ===
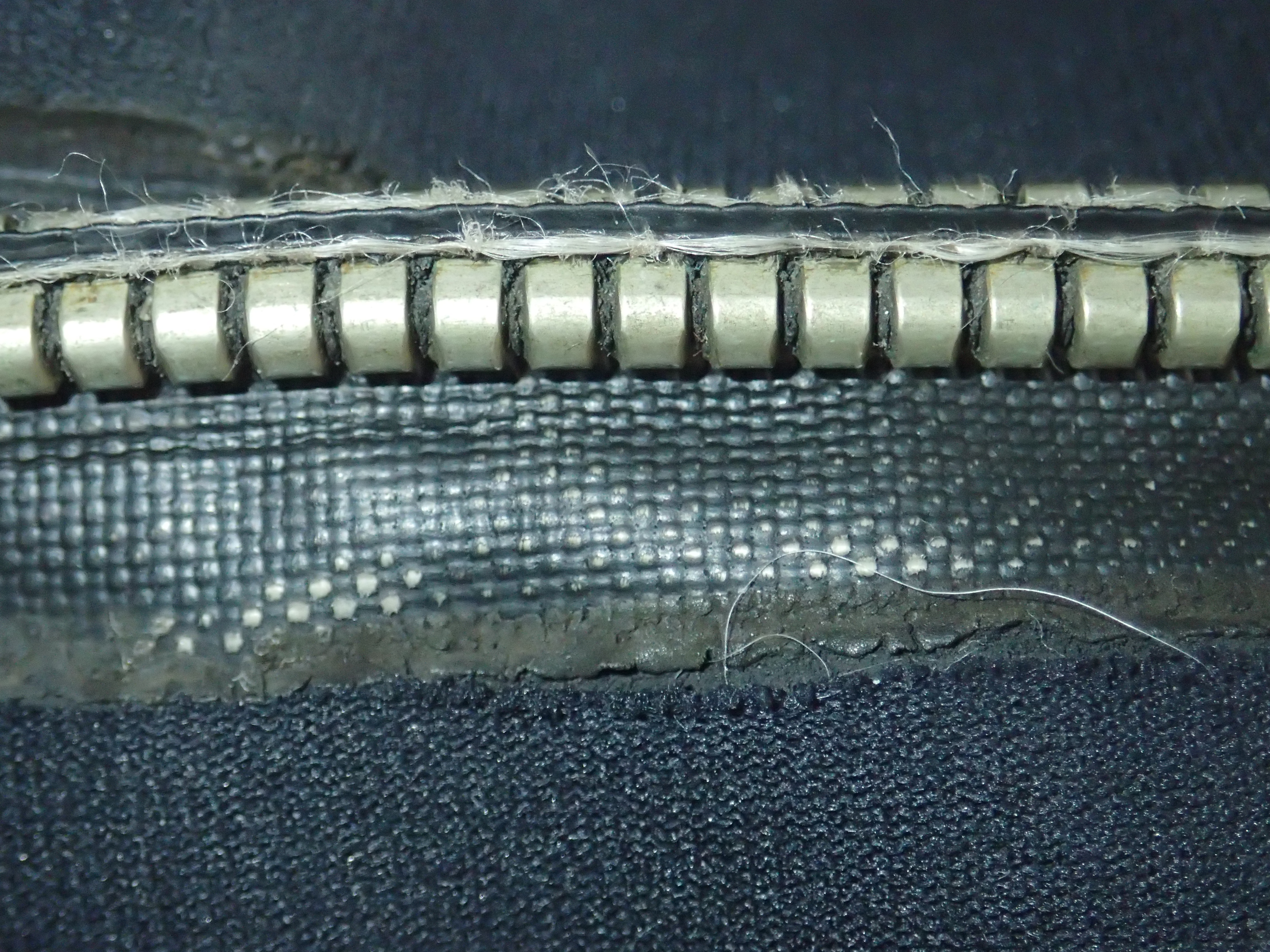
Frayed edge of zipper tape

Metal toothed watertight zippers rely on pressure between the two rubberized contact surfaces of the zipper tapes alongside the teeth for sealing. To get this pressure, the slider needs to press the two faces together while closing, and this increases friction between the slider and the teeth, so the zipper requires considerably more force to close than regular zippers. If the two rows of open teeth are lined up and close together in front of the slider it will prevent misalignment which can permanently damage the sealing edge, and allow the zipper to be closed with less effort. Friction can be reduced by suitable lubrication on the outside surface of the metal teeth, which is usually done with a waterproof wax or grease which remains on the zipper when wet. There should not be an excessive buildup of lubricant which would stick to particles of grit and cause wear and additional friction. The plastic tooth zippers have less friction than the metal teeth and need less force to close. The zipper teeth are moulded from a low friction polymer, but must be kept free of grit, so are not normally lubricated, but the slider docking area at the closing end must be greased for a proper seal on the TIZIP model but must not be greased on the YKK model. On metal toothed zippers, the cut edges of the rubberized fabric of the zipper tapes are susceptible to fraying along the exposed weave. if not trimmed, the frayed edges can accelerate damage to the weave and eventually cause zipper failure by delamination of the edge. The moulded plastic zippers do not have an exposed cut edge, so do not have this weakness. The metal toothed zippers are stiffer and require more force to move the slider, and are more easily damaged by bending to a small radius. There were structural problems with some of the early plastic tooth zippers losing teeth, but these have been fixed by changing the manufacturing process and later models have become reliable.

Metal zipper failure modes include: worn out backing rubber, where the slider wears through the outer layer of the zipper, exposing the reinforcing fabric, loose or lost teeth, kinked or torn side tape between teeth, and worn out teeth on the interlocking area. Fraying of the reinforcing fabric along the cut edge can be tolerated as long as frayed fibres do not get between the sealing surfaces, thereby causing a leak, cause the slider to jam, or hook on snags and cause more serious damage.

== Hazards of use ==
=== Overheating before a dive ===
Dressing into a dry suit is usually more time-consuming than a wet suit, and may require the assistance of another person to check the neck seal and close the zipper. In situations where the air is warm but the water cold, a prolonged time on the deck of a boat donning a dry suit and other gear can present a risk of overheating to the diver. This is a particular problem to relatively inexperienced divers, who may require more time to dress in. This problem can be mitigated by preparing all other equipment as far as possible before fully donning the suit and to wet the outside of the suit, and the hair and face after closing the zipper, to provide some evaporative cooling while on deck. Professional stand-by divers may have a similar problem, as they are required to be ready for deployment at all times while the working diver is in the water, which may involve waiting on deck for several hours. Wetting the outside of the suit, and seating the diver in shade and a breeze, are the usual solutions to this problem. Overheating in the suit can also happen when there is a difficult route to the water for a shore dive. A side effect of overheating is that the sweat produced by the diver can condense on the inside of the suit, or wet the thermal undergarment, reducing the insulating qualities during the dive.

=== Wind chill after a dive ===
Evaporative cooling in wind can, in very cold or windy conditions, remove more heat from the diver than the water does. This effect can also occur on deck in cold wind with spray. Any form of protection against the wind and spray that reduces evaporative cooling on the surface of the suit can be to some degree effective against wind chill. Adding air to the interior of the suit also increases insulation.

Temperatures above the ice may be considerably lower than water temperature, which is limited by freezing point of the water, and may be further exacerbated by wind chill. This can be a limiting factor on the endurance of the surface team if inadequately insulated and sheltered, and can have an impact on the divers on exiting the water in wet exposure suits.

=== Suit squeeze ===
During descent the air in the suit is compressed and unless more is added, the folds may be pressed together so tightly by water pressure that they pinch the skin, which is painful and may cause local bruising. The suit may also become so tight that movement is restricted, particularly in a membrane suit. This problem is managed by suit inflation from a low pressure gas supply.

=== Over-inflation ===
During ascent, the air added during descent must be removed again, in order to prevent over-inflation, excessive buoyancy, and potential uncontrolled ascent, with possibly fatal consequences. Most modern dry suits are equipped with adjustable spring-loaded automatic exhaust valves, which can assist with this problem by automatically dumping excess gas when properly set and when the valve is higher than the excess gas in the suit. This is most effective and reliable when the volume of the gas in the suit is limited to maintaining undergarment loft, and the dump valve is kept shallower than the feet. If the suit is sealed directly to a helmet, the exhaust valve of a free-flow helmet or the exhaust valve of the demand valve of a demand helmet serve this purpose.

=== Suit flooding ===
Damage to the lower part of the suit can cause a sudden inrush of very cold water for winter users, or an inrush of contaminated water or chemicals for hazmat divers. Damage to the upper part of the suit can cause a sudden venting of the air, resulting in a loss of buoyancy and possible uncontrolled descent, followed by flooding with water and loss of thermal insulation, and possible exposure to hazardous materials if the water is contaminated.

A flooded suit may contain so much water that the diver cannot climb out of the water because of the weight and inertia. In this case it may be necessary to cut a small slit in the lower part of the leg to let water drain out as the diver rises out of the water. This will take some time, and agility will be seriously compromised. The damage should not be difficult to repair if the slit is cut with reasonable care. Ankle dump valves will also serve to drain a flooded suit once enough of the diver is above the water.

=== Decompression risk from loss of heat during a dive ===
Experimental work by the US Navy Experimental Diving Unit shows that getting cold during decompression after being warm during the working part of the dive may be the worst case body temperature profile for decompression risk. Active heating systems that fail during the dive, and suit flooding have the potential to cause this scenario. Divers should be aware of the possible effects of thermal stress on decompression outcome, and the use of active heating should be considered in the context of this risk. Decompression computer algorithms that are claimed to take temperature into consideration are generally taking ambient temperature measurements, which has no reliable correlation to actual body temperature of the diver, and are in those cases of little relevance. Pollock (2015) suggests that active diver heating should be minimised to safely complete dive tasks during ingassing and increased during decompression with due attention to avoiding heat stress and dehydration.

=== Diving without a buoyancy compensator ===
Dry suits are not designed to be used as buoyancy compensator devices (BCD) and cannot offer the same degree of safety and control as a BCD. However, the fact that it is possible to control buoyancy using a dry suit has led some divers to attempt to control their buoyancy with the dry suit alone and dive without the dedicated BCD normally worn by scuba divers. Although it is possible to dive like this, the risks are higher than when using a buoyancy compensator for the following reasons:

- The BCD is more robust than a dry suit. Dry suits are not designed to be buoyancy compensators and more prone to failure than BCDs, they have multiple points of failure and can completely flood when a seal tears or a zip breaks or leaks. Wrist and neck seals can vent accidentally; annoying if wearing a BCD, possibly fatal without.
- The vent valves of a BCD are more secure and have backups, often via the inflator hose, the left shoulder valve, and a dedicated dump valve at the bottom. The dry suit usually only has an automatic dump valve at the left shoulder, other than manipulating the neck and wrist seals, and wrist seals may not be available if wearing dry gloves attached by a cuff ring.
- The BCD is designed to act as a flotation device on the surface, the dry suit is not.
- The BCD can be orally inflated if out of air at the surface, the dry suit is not normally provided with oral inflation fittings.
- The lifting capacity of the dry suit is less. This is because it is not designed to lift. It may not be sufficient if entering the water overweighted or if required to assist others. A large lifting capacity makes the buoyancy more difficult to control and the risk of severe overinflation is greater.
- If a dry suit floods, the release of the diving weights may not be sufficient to compensate, especially if the cylinders are negatively buoyant. There is no simple method to test this without flooding the suit.
- It increases the risk on an inversion. Dry suit inversions are dangerous and are best controlled by minimising the volume of air in the suit. If using the BCD for buoyancy control, and the suit inflation only to avoid a squeeze and provide undergarment loft, the suit should never contain an excess of air. If it does contain excess air as a result of using it for buoyancy or to compensate for being over-weighted the excess air may migrate to the legs causing the diver to invert to a dangerous feet-up position making venting the dry suit difficult or impossible and leading to an uncontrolled ascent.
- Maintaining horizontal trim is more difficult and trim may change suddenly. Excess air will migrate as the diver changes pitch attitude and may cause dangerous instability.
- No redundancy. A dry suit might compensate for a BCD failure, but relying on the dry suit alone leaves no buoyancy control redundancy.
- Having a BCD makes it easier for a buddy assisting in an emergency to determine where the buoyancy is located and how to control it.

=== Carotid-sinus reflex ===
An over-tight neck seal can put pressure on the carotid artery, causing a reflex which slows the heart, resulting in poor oxygen delivery to the brain, light-headedness and eventual unconsciousness. For this reason, neck seals should be stretched or trimmed to the correct size.

=== Accidental body-inversion hazards ===
==== Underwater ====
If there is more gas in the dry suit than is needed to counteract "squeeze" on the undersuit, that excess gas accumulates as a "bubble" at the highest point of the suit. In an upright diver this is at the shoulders and around the neck seal, or in an integral hood. Divers need to keep their upper body tilted sufficiently head-up to prevent the bubble from moving into the legs and feet, causing the legs to rise, and inverting the diver's body into a head-down position.

The movement of a large bubble to the legs can be a problem for a number of reasons: It inflates the legs, and may inflate thin rubber booties enough to cause fins to pop off, or cause the boots to pop off the feet, with the fins still in place on the boots. A diver without fins has reduced ability to maneuver back to a head up trim, and also loses the ability to kick downward to maintain depth, so that the bubble expansion problem does not get worse. Gas in the legs and feet of the suit usually cannot be evacuated while the diver is inverted, as most suits do not have ankle dump valves, and the inverted diver may start to float toward the surface, causing the problem of expanding air in the suit to grow worse in proportion to the decrease in depth. If the diver is positively buoyant and rising, the buoyancy of the dry suit will become uncontrollable, and ascent rate will accelerate. The final result of such a run-away inversion is a diver rising all the way to the surface, feet first, in an uncontrolled ascent that is too rapid for decompression safety.

When the suit is used correctly, the excess gas bubble inside it is relatively small, and its movement is not important. The bubble may be large for a variety of reasons: if a diver ascends without venting the suit; if the valve supplying gas the suit fails in the open position; or if the diver is over-weighted, and extra gas has been added to the suit to make the diver neutrally buoyant. The size of the bubble can be minimised by being correctly weighted, using the buoyancy compensator to adjust for weight changes due to gas consumption, keeping the exhaust valve high, and venting excess gas from the suit on ascent. It is a recommended practice to ensure that the bubble remains small and at the top of the body by using the buoyancy compensator to counteract any excess weighting, keeping only the minimum gas necessary to maintain undergarment loft inside the drysuit. Suits that fit correctly and are not excessively stretchy also help.

The recommended procedure in all such inversion incidents, is for the diver to bend at the knees and powerfully swing the arms to do a backward or forward roll to the upright position without delay, to allow the gas to flow to the shoulders and arms, allowing the automatic dump valve to operate, and then vent the suit, if needed, by manually opening the neck seal (sometimes called "burping the suit") by breaking the seal-neck contact with a finger. If finning downwards is not immediately effective, it will not become effective later as the gas continues to expand.

==== Surface ====
Surface dry suit users can face a similar inversion problem. The problem is more acute when not wearing a personal flotation device (life vest) over the dry suit. For surface dry suit users, an inversion can be critical since the wearer may be held upside down and unable to breathe, however, as the user is unlikely to be wearing weights it should be easy to return to a horizontal, face-up position.

It is not a problem for close-fitting neoprene suits, or hybrid suits with neoprene bottoms, which prevent air from easily moving into the legs of the suit. Wearers of baggy surface dry suits can mitigate the problem by venting out as much excess air as possible before entering the water. This is typically done by crouching down and leaning forward, wrapping the arms around the knees. Excess air can be "burped" out of the neck or cuff seal if there is no dump valve. The zip should be closed with as little tension as reasonably practicable across the opening.

== History ==
=== Early years ===
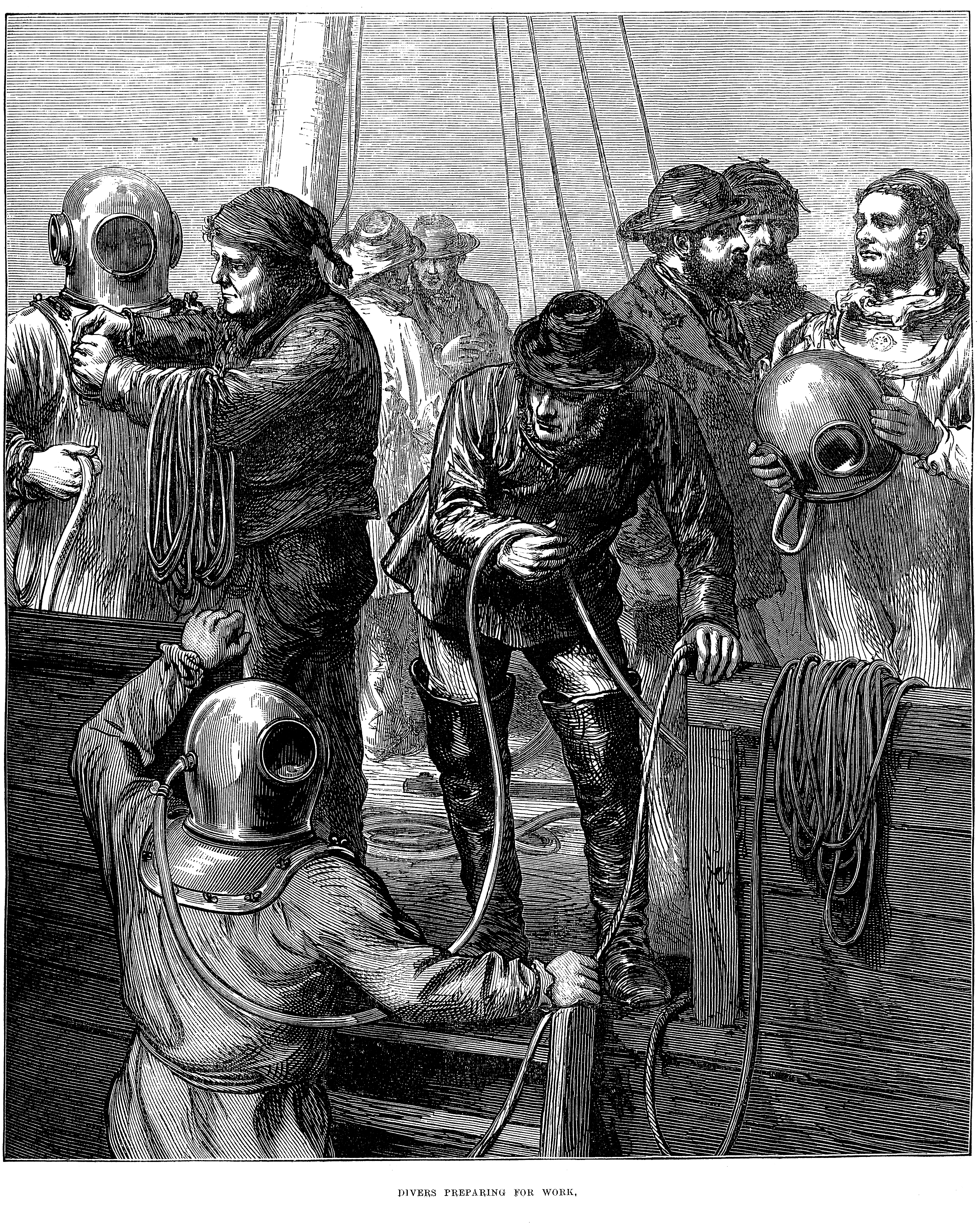
Siebe's improved design in 1873, from the Illustrated London News. The helmet's basic features can be seen: A helmet, supplied with air from the surface, and a waterproof suit. The corselet of the helmet is clamped onto the suit with wingnuts over a rubber flange.

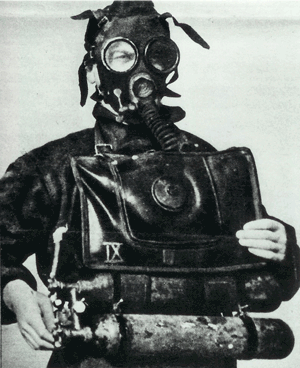
Italian frogman of the Decima Flottiglia

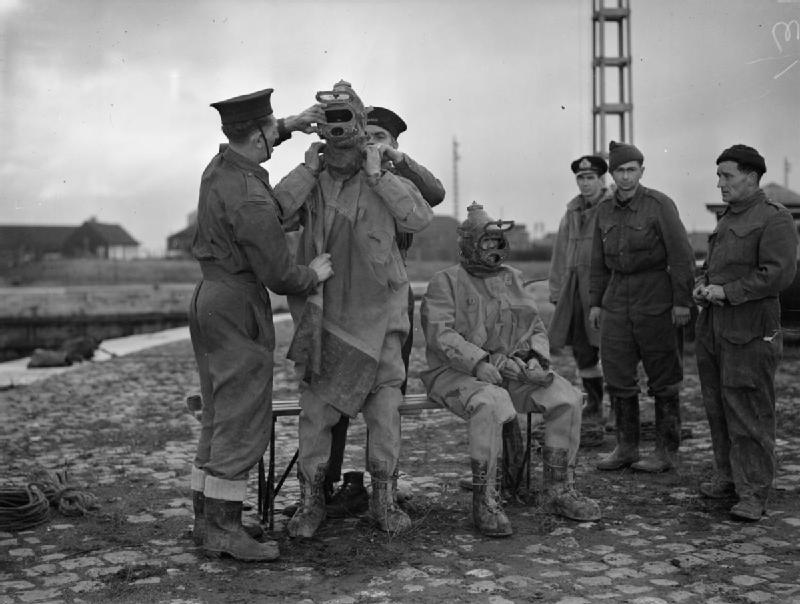
Royal Navy divers in Sladen suits during the Second World War

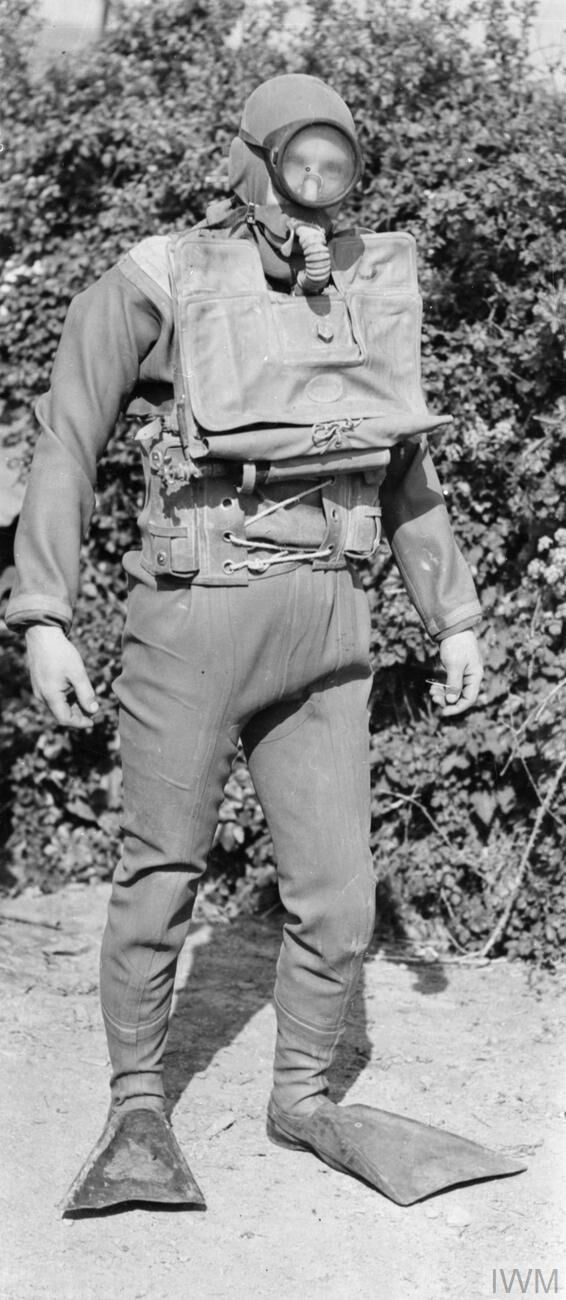
British navy frogman in dry suit c1945

In the 1830s, the Deane brothers asked Augustus Siebe to improve their diving helmet design. Expanding on improvements already made by another engineer, George Edwards, Siebe produced his own design; a helmet clamped to a full-length watertight canvas diving suit. The real breakthrough of the equipment was sealing the helmet to the suit, and using a non-return valve in the helmet to exhaust the air, which meant that the suit and helmet could not flood no matter how the diver moved, and the interior of the suit remained dry. Siebe introduced various modifications on this design to accommodate the requirements of the salvage team on the wreck of HMS Royal George, including making the helmet detachable from the corselet; his improved design gave rise to the typical standard diving dress which revolutionised underwater civil engineering, underwater salvage, commercial diving and naval diving.

On 14 June 1834, Leonard Norcross of Dixfield, Maine was awarded a patent for a dry suit made of rubber with an attached metal helmet. This was not the first American patent for a diving suit – it was the third patent of that year for an underwater suit, but Norcross' invention was the first to specify rubber as the waterproofing material.

In France in the 1860s, Benoît Rouquayrol and Auguste Denayrouze developed a single stage demand regulator with a small low pressure reservoir, to make more economical use of surface supplied air pumped by manpower. This was originally used without any form of mask or helmet, but vision was poor, and the "pig-snout" copper mask was developed in 1866 to provide a clearer view through a glass faceplate on a copper mask clamped to the neck opening of the suit. This was soon improved to become a three-bolt helmet supported by a corselet (1867). Later versions were fitted for free-flow air supply.

The earliest suits were made of waterproofed canvas invented by Charles Mackintosh. From the late 1800s and throughout most of the 20th century, most suits consisted of a solid sheet of rubber between layers of tan twill. Their thick vulcanized rubber collar is clamped to the corselet making the joint waterproof. The inner collar (bib) was made of the same material as the suit and pulled up inside the corselet and around the diver's neck. The space between the bib and corselet would trap most condensation and minor leakage in the helmet, keeping the diver dry. The sleeves could be fitted with integral gloves or rubber wrist seals and the suit legs ended in integral socks.

The twill was available in heavy, medium, and light grades, with the heavy having the best resistance to abrasion and puncture against rough surfaces like barnacles, rocks and the jagged edges of wreckage. Vulnerable areas were reinforced by extra layers of fabric. Different types of standard diving dress are defined by the clamping of the collar seal to the rim of the corselet or to the joint between bonnet and corselet, and the number of bolts used for this purpose. In some suits the legs could be laced at the back to limit inflated volume, which would limit the volume of excess gas that could be trapped in the legs and reduce the risk of it dragging an inverted diver to the surface.

The waterproof rubberised fabric, the seal to the helmet and the cuff seals kept the diver dry, allowing sufficient clothing to be worn under the suit to keep warm depending on the water temperature and expected level of exertion. The suit was usually a very baggy fit on the diver, and if over-inflated, would be too bulky to allow the diver to reach the control valves for air supply and exhaust. This contributed to the risk of suit blowup, which could cause an uncontrollable buoyant ascent, with high risk of decompression illness. To add to this problem, a runaway ascent could cause sufficient internal pressure to burst the seal at the corselet, which could result in a catastrophic loss of buoyancy, and the injured diver sinking back to the bottom in a flooded suit. Consequently, divers would ensure that they were weighted enough to remain sufficiently negative when underwater to minimise this risk, and to allow reasonably stable walking on the bottom. The bulkiness of fit, weighted boots, lack of fins, and lack of fine buoyancy control made swimming impracticable. At the surface the diver could struggle a short distance using the arms, but underwater would normally walk on the bottom and climb up and down over obstacles, taking care to avoid passing under anything that could foul the air hose. The diver needed to remain upright when ascending to allow venting of excess air through the helmet exhaust valve, and would either be lowered and pulled up by the tenders, or would slide down the shotline and climb back up it.

The Pirelli dry suit was designed in the 1930s and used by Italian frogmen during World War II. It became available for recreational divers after the war and was patented (US Pat. No. 2,570,019) in 1951 for Pirelli by Eugenio Wolk, listed as the inventor. This two-piece suit was made from thin and elastic rubber, optionally bonded to a knit fabric reinforcement liner except at the sealing areas at the neck, wrists and waist. The waist seal was achieved by folding up the sealing area of the jacket, and overlapping the sealing area of the trousers, then and folding the overlap down over itself more than once before securing it in place over a profiled heavy rubber waistband using an elastic belt which pulls the multiply folded part into a groove in the waistband. Neck and cuff seals were the forerunners of the latex seals still used for this application. The patent claims this to be the first application of thin and flexible form-fitting rubber for the manufacture of dry suits, and also patents the waist seal system. The suits were intended to be worn over woolen underwear for thermal protection. There was no facility to inject air during a dive. These suits were available in four sizes and five styles, three of which were full length two-piece suits with integral boots, one of which was lined with cloth, and two of which had an optional integral hood on the jacket. The other two models were a two-piece with short sleeves and legs, and a one-piece short trouser unit with suspenders which sealed on the chest and thighs.

=== World War II and later 20th century ===
British frogmen of World War II and for some time afterwards used a similar one- or two-piece rubberized knit fabric suit by Siebe Gorman, who produced the one-piece front-tunnel-entry Sladen suit with integral rubber helmet, developed by the British Admiralty for use with manned torpedoes, and in the late 1950s also the Essjee two-piece waist-entry swim suit, based on the Sladen suit. The Essjee suit consisted of a jacket with rubber hood and lightweight wrist cuffs, and trousers shod with moulded rubber soles. Soft open cell sponge-rubber pads inside the hood covered the ears and allowed air flow inside the suit for them to be equalised. There was space under the suit for plenty of woollen underclothes. The suit was available in proofed gabardine or rubberised stockinette, with the cloth on the outside and the rubber inside, to protect the rubber from sunlight while in use.

In 1945, the Spearfisherman Company, of Huntington Beach, California was approached by the US Navy to produce a rubber suit. These were advertised in the first issue of the Skin Diver magazine in December 1951. They were tunnel-entry suits, and were available as full length or shortie suits with integral hood. Later versions had a neck-level entry chute and a nape valve to purge trapped air. The shortie version was also rebranded as Kellys 7-seas suit.

In 1946 Jacques Cousteau developed a constant volume drysuit which was inflated by blowing air under the mask skirt into the hood of the suit. Valves in the hood, wrists, and ankles, allowed venting in most positions.

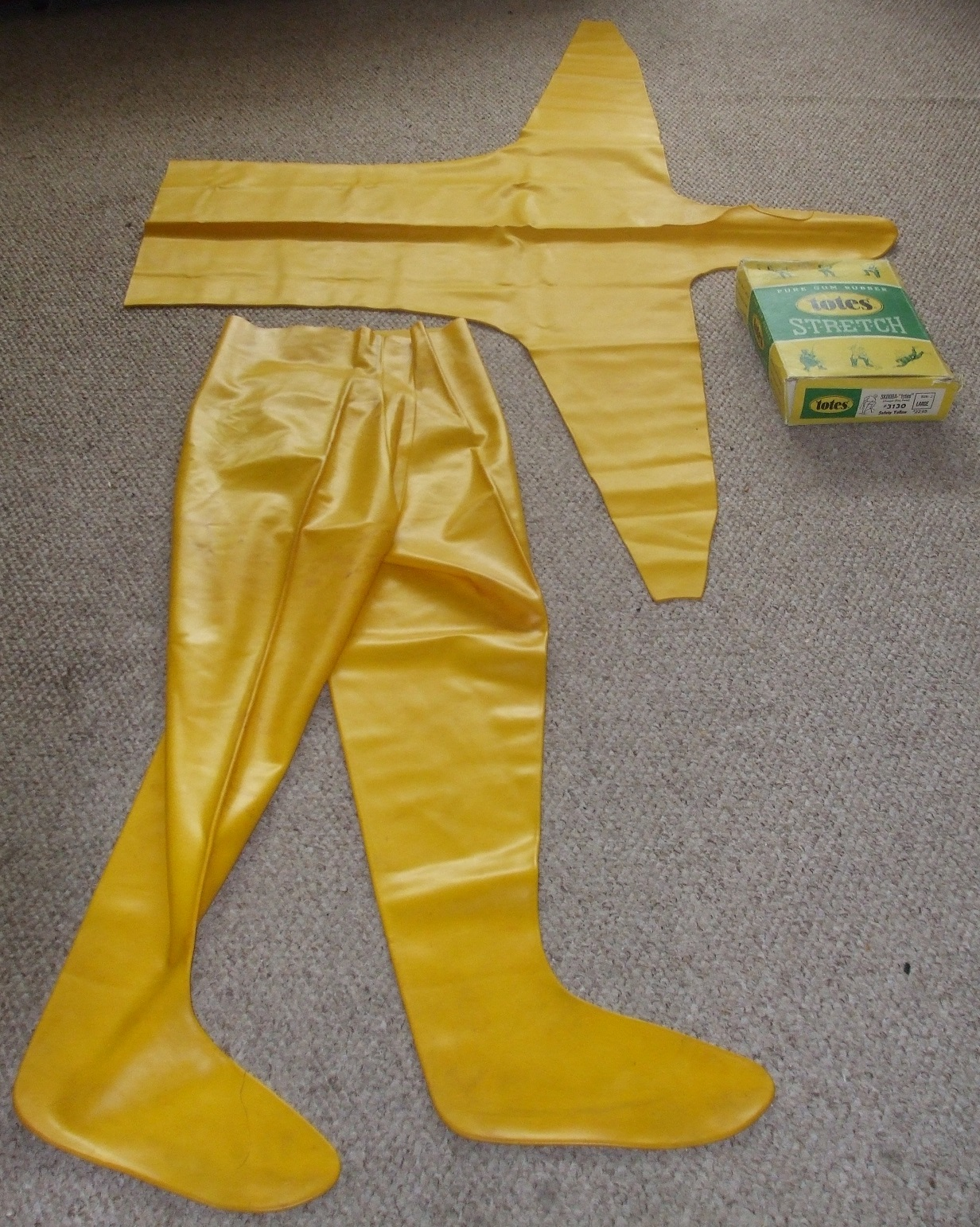
Yellow Skooba-"totes" dry suit manufactured by So Lo Marx Rubber Company of Loveland, Ohio, in late 1950s or early 1960s.

Seamless dipped latex one and two-piece suits were available In the US from the early 1950s. Two-piece suits were connected and sealed by a rolled overlap at the waist or with a "ring and rail" waist-seal, and were available in long- or short-leg versions and long- or short-sleeved versions, all with integral neck, and cuff or arm and thigh seals, and in a range of sizes and colours. The one-piece suits were available with long or short legs and sleeves, and with front or back tunnel, pocket, or neck entry. Separate hoods and boots or reinforced feet for the long leg versions were available as options. Suits were manufactured in dipped latex, 2 and 3 ply gum rubber and textile backed rubber. Some were assembled from cut components, while others were dipped one-piece seamless latex construction. Kits were also available for home completion. Manufacturers included Waterwear of Newport Beach, California, Healthways, W.J. Voit Rubber Corporation, Bel-Aqua Water Sports Company of Los Angeles, (later Aquala Sports Manufacturing Company), So-Lo Marx Rubber Company of Loveland, Ohio, and the Dolphin Manufacturing Company of California.

The UK-based Dunlop Rubber Company produced drysuits for military and commercial divers and the Dunlop Aquafort range for recreational use.

By the mid-1950s, C.E. Heinke & Co. Ltd., an established manufacturer of standard diving equipment, had diversified into recreational underwater swimming equipment, including the Delta dry suit, made from natural rubber on a stockinette base. The basic Delta was a two-piece suit made up of a jacket with neck seal and trousers with ankle seals which could be worn over woolen undergarments. The full suit included integral hood and feet. For a few years after C.E. Heinke & Co. Ltd. was taken over by Siebe-Gorman and Company in 1961, dry suits were marketed under the Siebe-Heinke label. The Siebe-Heinke Dip Suit for recreational diving, swimming, yachting and fishing, was a seamless black dipped-latex jacket with neck and cuff seals, and trousers with separate yellow latex cummerbund for the waist-seal. A yellow hood and black protective over-bootees were optional extras. The Siebe-Heinke Frogman dry suit for professional and recreational use, introduced in 1963, was available in stockinette proofed with black rubber, or proofed fawn twill. The suit consisted of booted trousers with reinforced soles or optional ankle seals, and a jacket with cuff seals and an option between a neck seal or integral hood, connected by a rolled waist seal and cummerbund.

=== Introduction of the watertight zipper and variable volume dry suit ===
Development of space-suits led to the pressure-tight zipper, first manufactured by B.F. Goodrich, and first used on a dry suit by Bev Morgan in 1956. The suit was in expanded neoprene and had an oral inflator and latex seals. This was followed by the Unisuit, by Poseidon Industri AB of Sweden, also in neoprene, and which included a low pressure inflator valve and exhaust valves. The zipper ran from mid-back to mid-chest via the crotch. This design became the industry standard for a while and use was widespread. Overpressure valves were installed in the ankles, wrists and neck of dry suits to remove excessive air introduced through the face mask to prevent discomfort created by squeeze, which also increased the insulation capacity of the undergarments. These were called constant volume dry suits, though the volume of gas in them will vary with the underwear in use, the attitude of the diver in the water, and during descent, with depth and manual addition of gas. What is constant is actually the opening pressure of the dump valves. Also in Sweden, Stig Insulán and Jorn Stubdal developed a vulcanised rubber drysuit, and Insulán patented the semi-automatic variable volume dry suit exhaust valve in 1971. This valve has a user adjustable overpressure opening setting, and can also be manually opened. When combined with the low pressure inflator valve, it gave the diver precise and trouble-free buoyancy control in what became known as the variable volume dry suit. Since then, plastic watertight zippers have been developed and are in widespread use on new suits and for replacement of damaged zippers, though the original metal toothed zippers are still available both as original equipment and for replacements. The all plastic injection moulded zipper must be greased on the landing wedge of the slider to create a proper seal.

=== Standardisation of inflation and deflation controls ===
Since recommendations on the standardisation of scuba equipment made at the 1989 American Academy of Underwater Science Biomechanics of Safe Ascents Workshop were made, there has been a general tendency for the position and operation of the inflation and dump valves to be very similar on most dry suits, making the adjustment to an unfamiliar suit relatively straightforward.

=== 21st century developments ===
Neoprene materials for wetsuits have developed and some of the changes have made them more suitable for dry suits. Among these are much greater abrasion resistance of the surface textiles. The relatively high stretch allows suits to be made with a more form-fitting cut, which reduces both hydrodynamic drag and excess internal volume. Thinner and higher density neoprene cores reduce the effect of depth on the shell thickness. Repair is also easier than for most membrane materials and can in some cases even be done on wet neoprene, making field repairs more practicable. These improvements are also expected to prolong the useful life of the suit.

Injection moulded plastic zippers have been developed that are cheaper and require less force to open and close than the metal toothed version, but may leak more if not completely closed, and may not last as long under heavy loads.

== Training ==
Training in the use of a dry suit include the techniques for putting it on and taking it off without damaging the zipper or seals, and for divers, the additional skills required for diving safely in a dry suit. Several diver training agencies offer skills training and certification specifically to safely dive in a dry suit. These skills are often part of a professional diver's basic training. Developing full proficiency usually requires considerably more experience than is available from the training programmes.

Training in the use of a dry suit for diving generally involves a theory class on the characteristics and types of dry suit, and the advantages and hazards associated with their use. There may be content on selection of a suit and assessing fit. Practical training will generally include inspection of the suit, how to put it on and take it off, how to determine correct weighting in conjunction with the rest of the diving equipment, routine maintenance and cleaning, basic skills of buoyancy control, and recovery from common problems which if not promptly corrected, could develop into emergencies. A small number of confined water and open water dives will be done to learn and practice the skills, but the ability to use a dry suit competently develops with practice. The prerequisite is usually an entry-level diving certification, but in some regions where the water is very cold, and with some agencies, entry-level training may be done in dry suits as an option.

=== Skills ===
Skills necessary for the safe and effective use of dry suits include:

- Choosing a suit of appropriate size and fit.
- Selecting appropriate undergarments for the water temperature.
- Setting up and preparation of the suit.
- Inspection of the suit for damage and defects before the dive.
- Dressing into the suit.
  - Closing the zip correctly.
  - Removing excess gas after putting on the suit.
- Choosing and distributing ballast weight to provide correct trim and buoyancy from the start to the end of the dive.
- Maintaining an appropriate gas volume in the suit during the dive:
  - Buoyancy control during descent, at constant depth, during ascent, and at the surface.
  - Inflation and dumping excess gas and setting the auto-dump valve.
  - Maintaining appropriate trim and attitude underwater and at the surface.
- Managing contingencies:
  - Connecting and disconnecting a pressurised inflator hose.
  - Managing a stuck inflation valve.
  - Recovery from inversion.
  - Recovery from uncontrolled buoyant ascent/blowup.
  - Managing a leak or flood.
- Undressing from the suit without damaging zip or seals.
- Post dive cleaning and maintenance.

== Manufacturers and brands ==
Inflation and dump valves are largely manufactured by Apeks and SI Tech. Inflation hoses are basically identical to low pressure hoses for use for inflating buoyancy compensators, but may be of different lengths depending on the gas source and hose routing. Silicone neck seals using a clamping ring system are made by DUI and SI Tech, and fitted to other brands by the manufacturer or as aftermarket improvements. Dry glove systems using clip-on mounting rings are made by several manufacturers; some can be fitted to a latex wrist seal already glued to the suit, others are glued directly to the sleeve of the suit, and the glove ring clips to the fixed ring while in use, usually with an o-ring seal. There is usually a wrist seal under the dry glove in case the glove comes off during the dive.

Watertight zippers are supplied to dry suit manufacturers by German company TiZip (plastic teeth) and BDM, Dynat and OEB from the YKK group (bronze teeth), and SZIP. (Chinese)

Past and present dry suit manufacturers include:

- Aquala also known as Bel-Aqua
- Bare (dive gear)
- Diving Unlimited International (DUI)
- Dunlop
- FitzWright Company Ltd.
- Fourth Element
- Heinke
- Loitokari
- Northern Diver International Ltd.
- O'Three
- Pirelli
- Poseidon Diving Systems
- Santi (dry suits)
- Siebe Gorman
- So-Lo Marx
- Spearfisherman (company)
- Typhoon International
- Viking dry suits are manufactured by Ansell Protective Solutions (formerly Trelleborg Protective Products). They are best known for their vulcanised rubber and polyurethane coated hazmat grade dry suits, but also manufacture trilaminate drysuits in VSN Cordura, Nylon and Polyester.
- Waterproof Diving International AB
- Whites Manufacturing

== See also ==
- Diving suit – Garment or device designed to protect a diver from the underwater environment
- Human factors in diving equipment design – Influence of the interaction between the user and the equipment on design
- List of water sports
- Sailing – Propulsion of a vehicle by wind power
- Space suit – Garment worn to protect a human in space
- Survival suit – Waterproof suit that protects the wearer from hypothermia from immersion in cold water
- Tuilik – Watertight jacket used when paddling a kayak
- Wetsuit – Garment worn to provide thermal protection while wet
