= History of Diving Museum =

Museum of underwater diving in Islamorada, Florida

- Established: 2000, opened 2005
- Location: Islamorada, Florida.
- Type: History of underwater diving
- Founders: Joe Bauer and Sally Bauer
- Executive director: Lisa Mongelia
- President: Sally E. Bauer
- Chairperson: Chris Dutton
- Website: divingmuseum.org

The History of Diving Museum is located in Islamorada, Florida which is in the Florida Keys. The museum's exhibits include a collection of vintage underwater diving equipment, a notable collection of diving helmets and various artifacts that are dedicated to the history of underwater diving.

== History ==
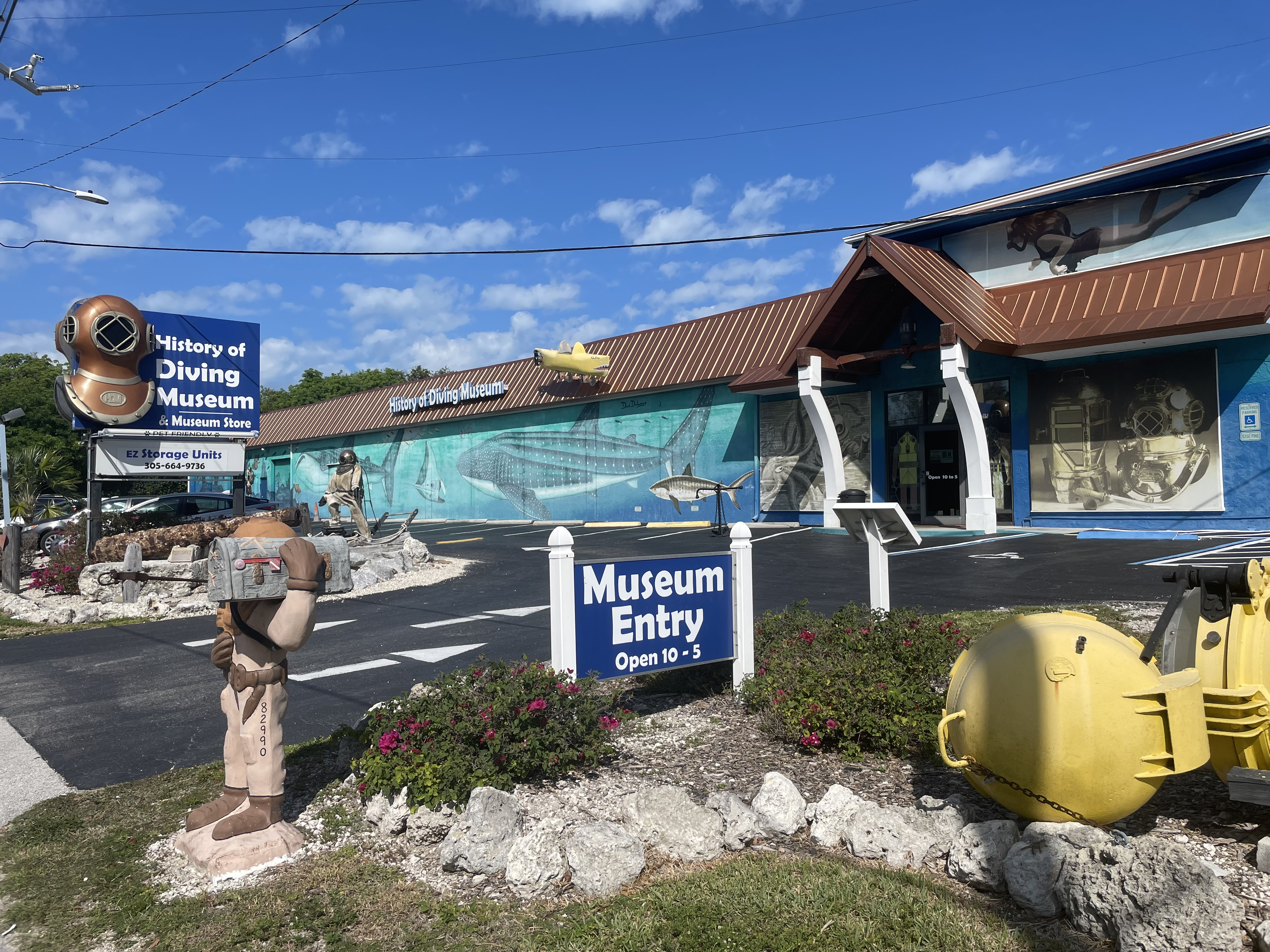
History of Diving Museum, front entrance

The not-for-profit museum was founded by Joe and Sally Bauer, retired physicians. A chance purchase of a diving helmet had started their interest in diving and the ocean. They wrote scientific articles on oceanic topics, and assembled a large collection of diving artifacts. In 2000, they started turning a self-storage warehouse in Islamorada into a museum. It opened to the public in 2005 and was in full operation the next year. Joe died in 2007 and his widow Sally continued the work.

== Exhibits ==
As of 2014, the museum had 13 exhibits on diving history, beginning with a story from the 3-4 thousand year old Epic of Gilgamesh. Diving pioneers such as Edmond Halley and Karl Heinrich Klingert are included. The museum has a large collection of diving helmets from over 20 countries. The collection includes atmospheric diving suits such as the 1930 "Iron Mike".

== Recognition ==
Sally Bauer was inducted into the Women Divers Hall of Fame in 2011. She received the NOGI Award in 2019. The mayor of Islamorada proclaimed January 12, 2019, to be "Dr. Sally Bauer Day".

The Bauers were also both founding members of the US and UK branches of the Historical Diving Society.

== Gallery ==
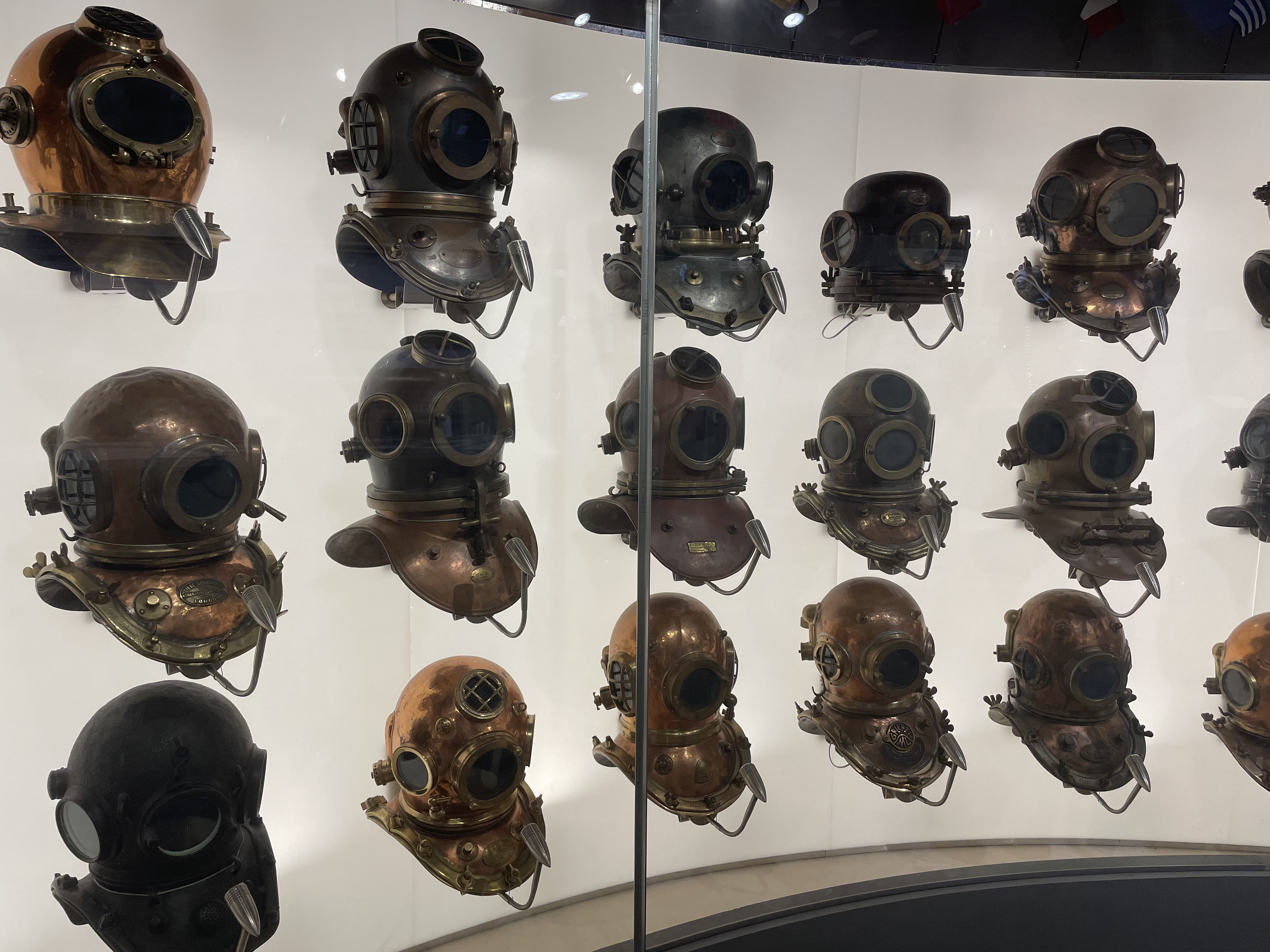
"Parade of Nations", display of standard diving helmets from different countries

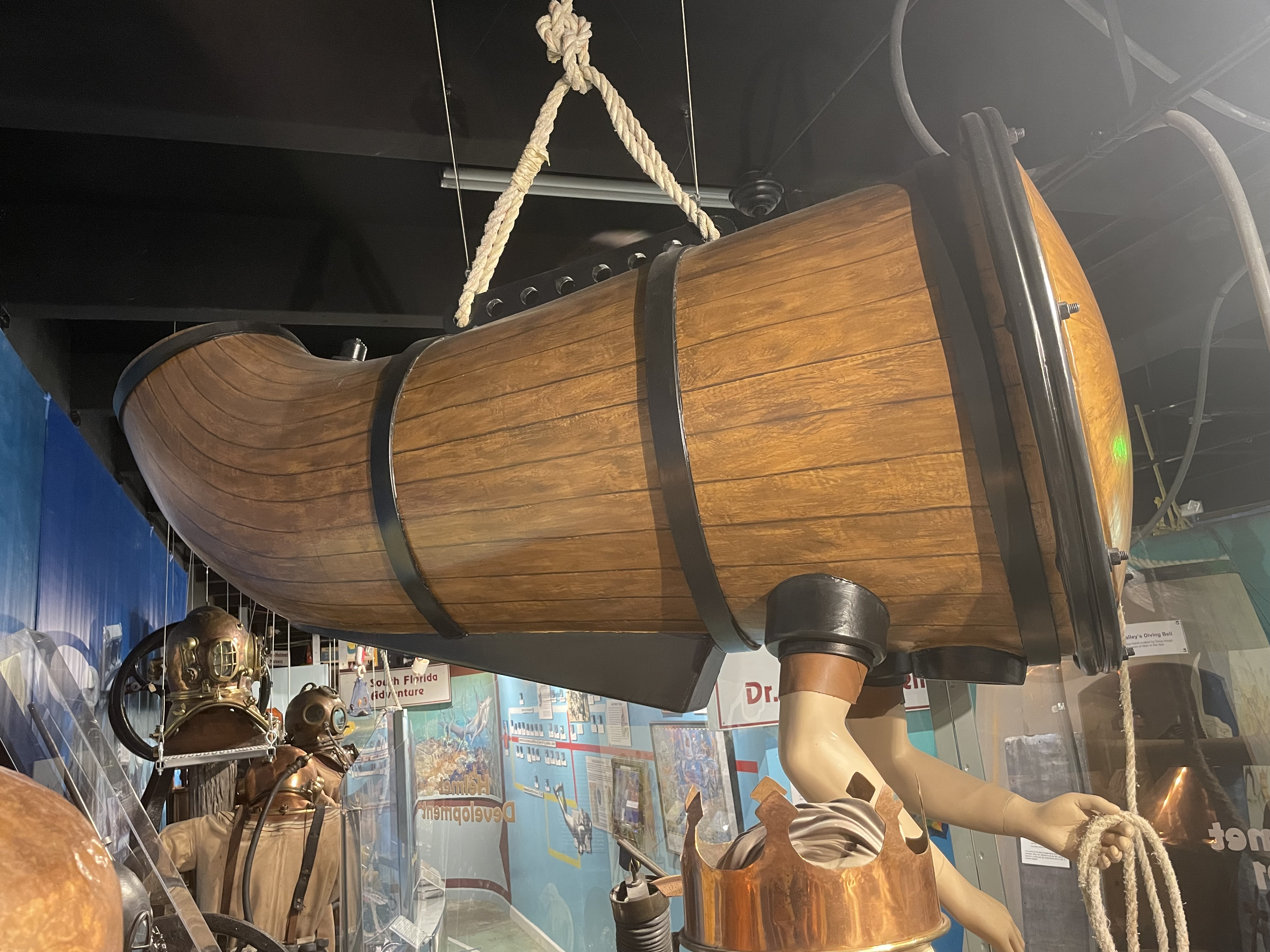
Replica of John Lethbridge's 1715 underwater diving machine

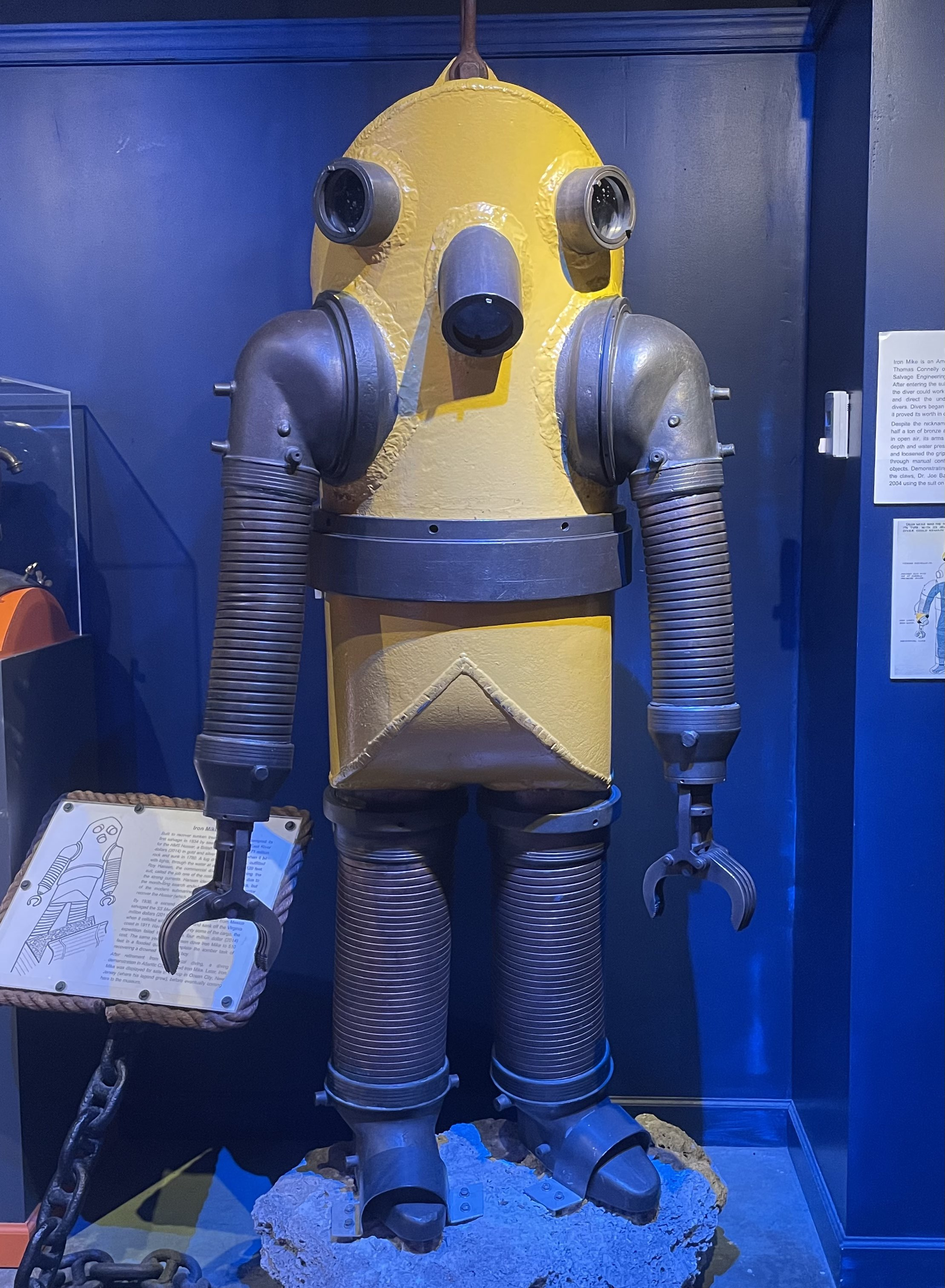
"Iron Mike" atmospheric diving suit of the 1930s

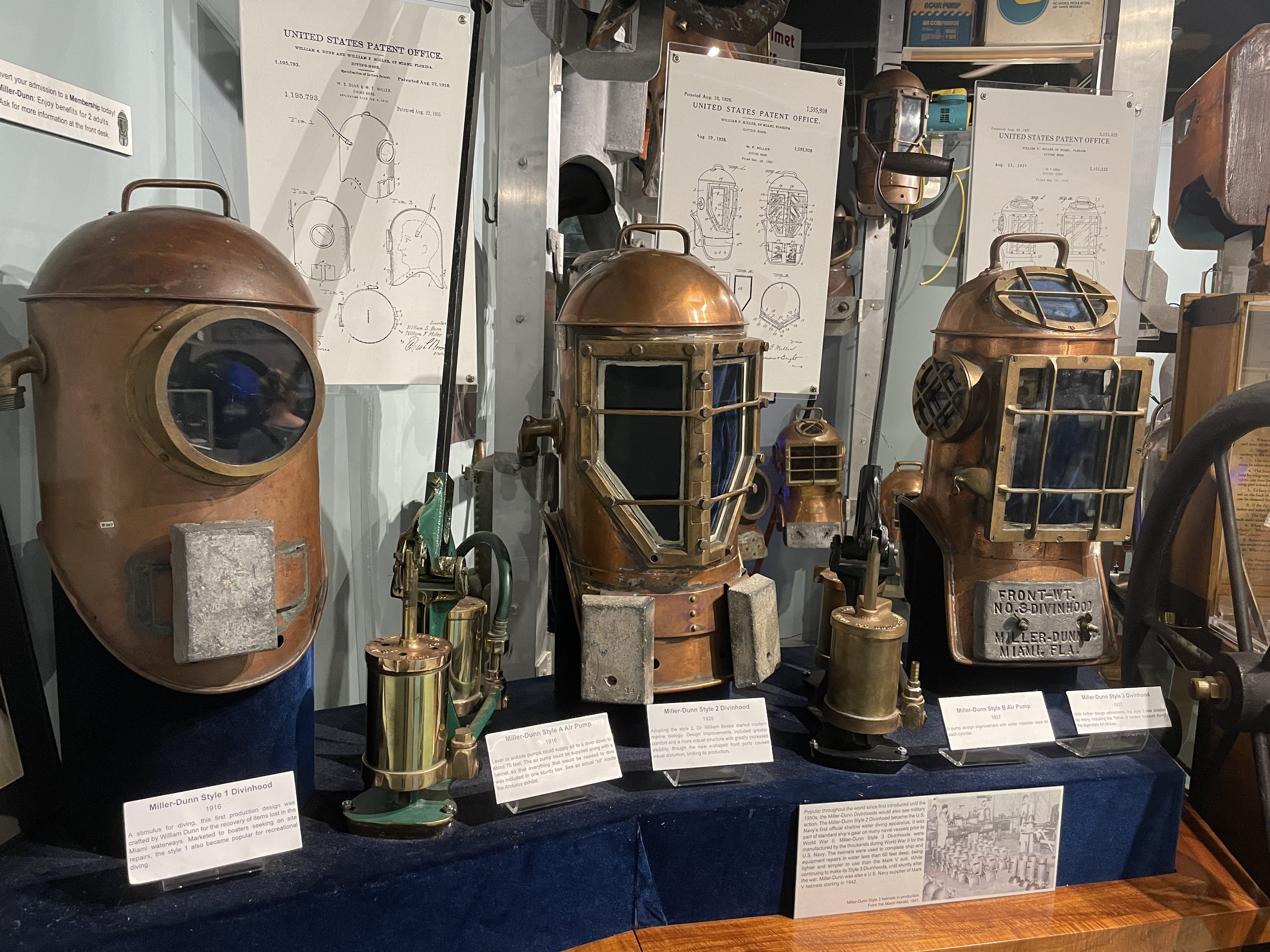
Shallow-water diving helmets by Miller-Dunn

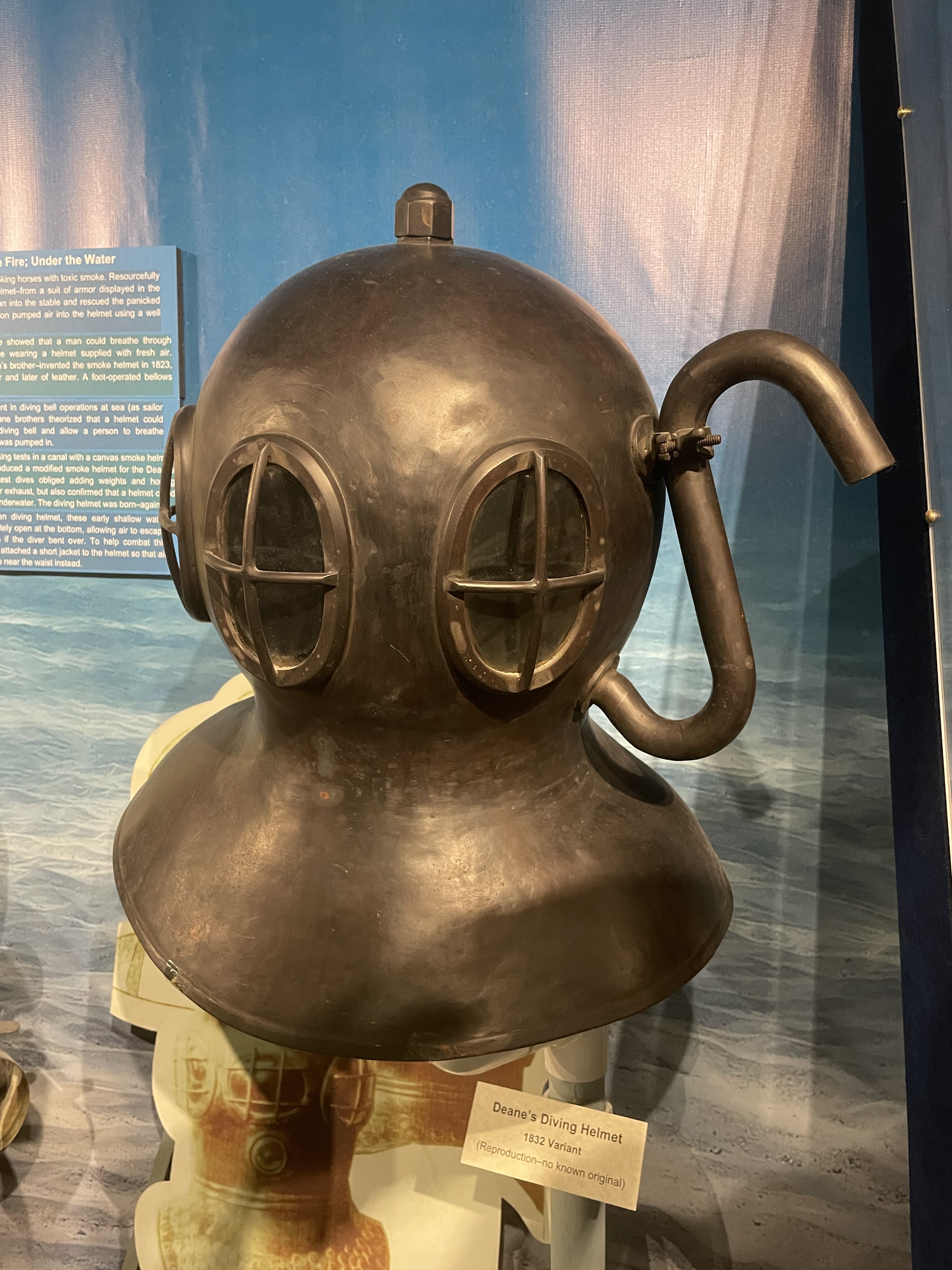
Replica of the diving helmet invented by brothers John and Charles Deane in 1832

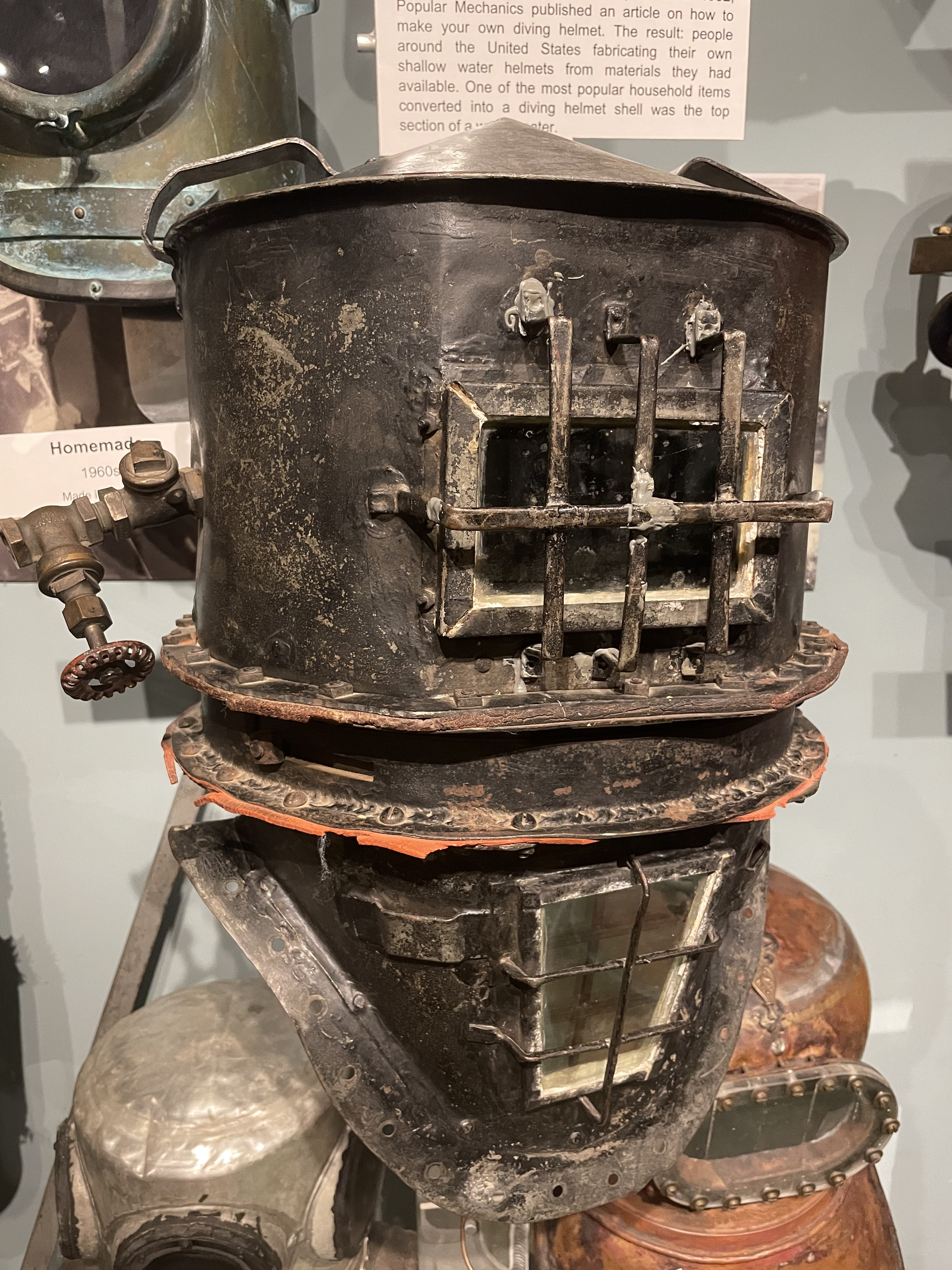
Homemade diving helmet used in smuggling operations during prohibition
