= Vansittart (1718 EIC ship) =

History

Great Britain
- Name: Vansittart
- Namesake: Peter van Sittart, father of Henry Vansittart
- Owner: Hugh Raymond
- Operator: British East India Company
- Builder: River Thames
- Launched: October 1718
- Fate: Wrecked 1719

General characteristics
- Tons burthen: 480 (bm)
- Complement: 96
- Armament: 34 guns

Vansittart was an East Indiaman of the British East India Company, launched in October 1718 on the River Thames. She sailed from the Downs on 18 January 1719, bound for Madras, and under the command of Captain Robert Hyde (or Hide). She was wrecked on 2 March at Maio, Cape Verde.

Her loss provided the opportunity for what may have been the first, or at least an early operational trial of a diving suit. John Lethbridge had invented one in 1715.

In April 1721 a salvage expedition set out from Spithead. It comprised two ships Audrey (of 380 tons (bm) and 36 guns), and Jolly Batchelor (20 guns). The British Royal Navy provided the frigate HMS Launceston to protect them from pirates. The salvors recovered substantial quantities of silver from Vansittart using a suit that Jacob Rowe had designed and then patented in 1720. When the operations finished on 2 August, the salvors had recovered almost 75K ounces of the 141K ounces of silver that she had carried, as well as 878 slabs of lead, plus guns and anchors.
