= Atmospheric diving suit =

Articulated pressure-resistant anthropomorphic housing for an underwater diver

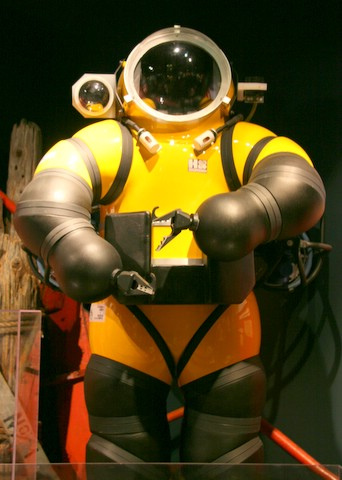
- An atmospheric diving suit on display in the Great Lakes Shipwreck Museum at Whitefish Point
- Acronym: ADS
- Other names: Hard suit, JIM suit
- Uses: Deep diving
- Related items: Submersible

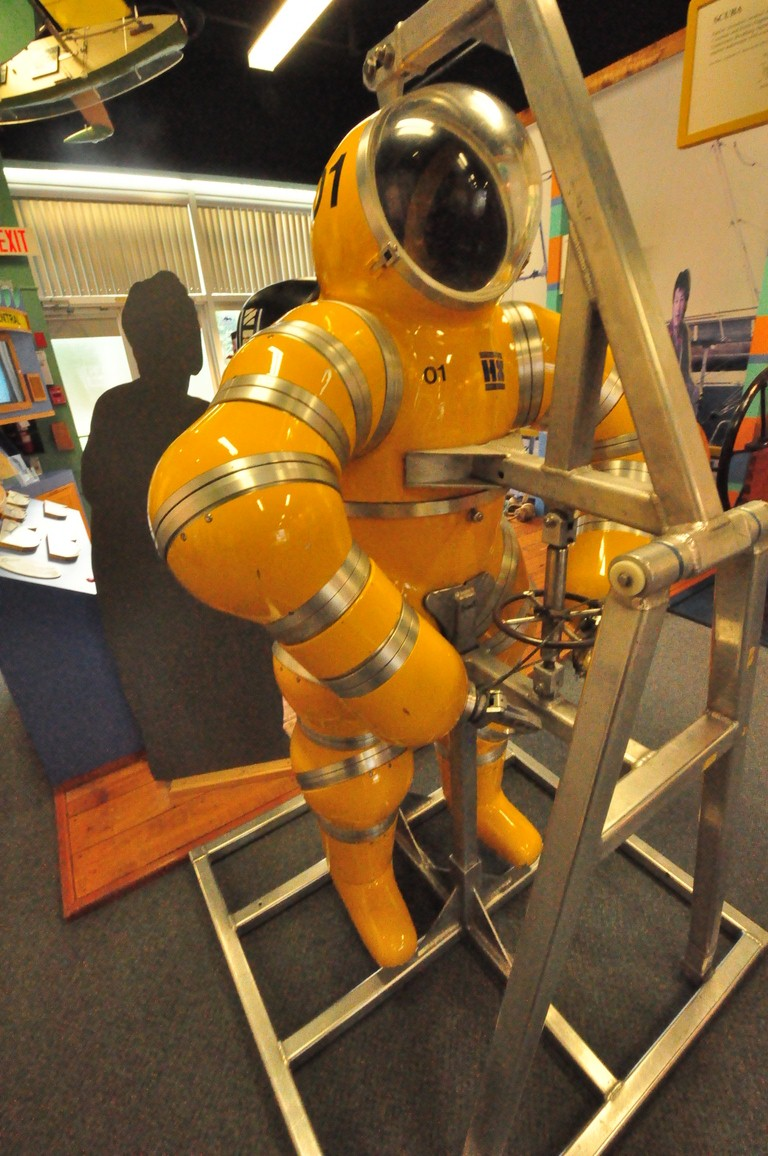
The Newtsuit has fully articulated, rotary joints in the arms and legs. These provide high mobility, while remaining largely unaffected by high pressures.

An atmospheric diving suit (ADS), atmospheric pressure diving suit or single atmosphere diving suit is a small one-person articulated submersible which resembles a suit of armour, with pressure-tight joints to allow articulation while maintaining a constant internal volume and an internal pressure of one atmosphere. An ADS can enable diving at depths of up to 2,300 feet (700 m) for many hours by eliminating the majority of significant physiological dangers associated with deep diving. The occupant of an ADS does not need to decompress, and there is no need for special breathing gas mixtures, so there is no danger of decompression sickness or nitrogen narcosis when the ADS is functioning properly. An ADS can permit less-skilled swimmers to complete deep dives, albeit at the expense of dexterity.

Atmospheric diving suits in current use include the Newtsuit, Exosuit, Hardsuit and WASP, all of which are self-contained hard suits that incorporate propulsion units. The Hardsuit is constructed from cast aluminum (forged aluminum in a version constructed for the US Navy for submarine rescue); the upper torso hull is made from cast aluminum, while the bottom dome is machined aluminum. The WASP is of glass-reinforced plastic (GRP) body tube construction.

== Definition and classification ==
An atmospheric diving suit is a small one-person submersible with articulated limbs encasing the diver. Water- and pressure-tight joints allow articulation while maintaining an internal pressure of one atmosphere. Mobility may be through thrusters for mid-water operation, though this is not a requirement, and articulated legs may be provided for walking on the substrate.

Thornton (2000) distinguishes an ADS from a submersible in that the ADS has human powered articulated limbs, as opposed to remotely operated articulated limbs. It is not clear whether this would exclude servo-assisted limbs encasing those of the operator, as a powered exoskeleton, but it might be reasonable to include them as atmospheric diving suits.

An atmospheric diving suit may be classified as a crewed submersible and a self-propelled, crewed, one-atmosphere underwater intervention device, but has also been classified as an atmospheric diving system.

A characteristic of single atmosphere internal pressure is that the suit cannot passively vent gas to ambient pressure. The options are to recycle breathing gas internally, adding oxygen and removing carbon dioxide, to vent surface supplied gas back to the surface through a hose which can safely withstand the external ambient pressure, or to pump it out by compressing it to ambient pressure before venting.

== Purpose and requirements ==
The underwater environment exerts major physiological stresses on the diver, which increase with depth, and appear to impose an absolute limit to diving depth at ambient pressure. An atmospheric diving suit is a small submersible with a pressure hull which accommodates a single occupant at an internal pressure of about one atmosphere. The provision of hollow arm spaces with pressure-resistant joints to carry manually operated manipulators, and usually separate leg spaces, similarly articulated for locomotion, makes a suit resemble a bulky suit of plate armour, or an exoskeleton, with elaborate joint seals to allow articulation while maintaining internal pressure.

An atmospheric diving suit is equipment intended primarily to isolate the occupant from the ambient pressure of the underwater environment, and provide any necessary life-support while the suit is in use. While using the suit, the diver will expect to perform useful work, and get to and from the place where the work is to be done. These functions require sufficient mobility, dexterity and sensory input to do the job, and this will vary depending on the details of the work. Consequently, the work possible in an atmospheric suit is limited by the suit construction.

Mobility at the surface and on deck can be managed by launch and recovery systems, Mobility underwater generally requires neutral or moderately negative buoyancy, and either the ability to walk or swim, or the use of finely controllable thrusters. Both walking and thruster propulsion have been applied with some success. Swimming has not been effective.

The dexterity to perform useful work is limited by joint mobility and geometry, inertia, and friction, and has been one of the more difficult engineering challenges. Haptic perception through manipulators is a major limitation on finer control, as the friction of the joints and seals greatly reduces the sensitivity available.

Operator visual input is relatively easy to provide directly by using transparent viewports. A wide field of view can be achieved simply and structurally effectively by using a transparent partial dome over the diver's head. Close-up views of the manipulators are limited by joint flexibility and geometry of the suit's arms. External sound and temperature perception are greatly attenuated, and there is no sense of touch through the suit. Communications must be provided by technology, as there is normally no-one else in the immediate vicinity.

=== Design constraints ===
The main environmental factors affecting design are the ambient hydrostatic pressure of the maximum operating depth, and ergonomic considerations regarding the potential range of operators. The structure and mechanics of the suit must reliably withstand the external pressure, without collapsing or deforming sufficiently to cause seals to leak or joints to experience excessive friction, and the full range of movement must not change the internal or external displaced volume, as this would have consequences for the amount of force required to move the joints in addition to the friction of the joint seals. Insulation is relatively simple, and can be applied to the inside of the suit and in the form of clothing on the diver. Active heating and cooling are also possible using well established technology. Mass changes can be used to provide initial and emergency buoyancy conditions by way of fixed and ditchable ballast weights.

Ergonomic considerations include the size and strength of the user. The interior dimensions must fit or be modifiable to fit a reasonable range of operators, and operating forces on joints must be reasonably practicable. The field of vision is constrained by the helmet design or viewport positioning, though closed circuit video can extend it considerably in any direction. General underwater conditions of visibility and water movement must be manageable for the range of conditions in which the suit is expected to be used. Marine thrusters may be mounted on the suit to help with maneuvering and positioning, and sonar and other scanning technologies may help provide an augmented external view.

Factors affecting the design and construction:

- Pressure hull form – Sufficient volume for necessary internal systems, constrained by size and shape of human operator, and by shapes with high resistance to collapse under external pressure.
  - Displacement – Need for neutral buoyancy at work and positive buoyancy in emergencies
  - Hydrodynamics – cruise speed
  - Propulsion – Thruster type and arrangement
  - Ergonomics – Anthropometry, joint design for limb articulation under external pressure.
- Working depth rating – Strength, rigidity and density of materials. Buckling, constant volume, and joint friction limiting factors
  - Construction materials
  - Safety.

=== Systems ===
Systems usually include:

On-board life-support:

- Breathing gas supply, monitoring and recycling
  - Monitoring of oxygen partial pressure, carbon dioxide level
  - Carbon dioxide scrubbing
  - Oxygen replenishment, oxygen storage cylinders
  - Emergency rebreather circulation systems.
- Thermal management

Buoyancy and trim ballast systems:

- Control of basic buoyancy
- Adjustment of trim – control of the positions of centre of gravity and centre of buoyancy.
- Compensating trim and buoyancy for payload effects.
- Achieving stability when submerged and in emergency Compensation for variations in water density due to stratification (temperature and salinity variations).
- Compensation for pressure effects.
- Adjustable and ditchable ballast systems.

Movement, propulsion, and navigation systems:

- Propulsion systems, thrusters.
- Control of vertical, lateral and forward movement, and rotation and orientation in three dimensions.

=== Safety and emergencies ===
Classes of emergency:

- Fires and fire extinguishing methods.
- Leaks and flooding.
- Entanglement.
- Life-support system failures, toxic hazards.
- Loss of communications and emergency communications options
- Loss of power and sensors.

There are also physiological and psychological effects of prolonged isolation underwater due to sensory deprivation and thermal stress.

=== Operating skills and procedures ===
Operator skills:

- Standard operating procedures:
  - Buoyancy set up of the suit (ballasting will vary depending on the mass and centre of gravity of the operator)
  - Flying in and around underwater structure
  - Reporting life support system readings while hovering
  - Through-water communications protocols
  - Rigging preparation and rigging work
    - Connecting the umbilical to a down-line
    - Attaching a shackle to work on the bottom and in mid-water
    - Use of buoyant lifting bags
  - Carrying loads and managing a tool basket
  - Use of powered underwater tools
  - Underwater measurement
- Emergency procedures:
  - Climbing the umbilical in the event of power loss, entrapment
  - Emergency jettison systems

=== Work skills ===
These may include submarine rescue, salvage, inspection and non-destructive testing, and typical oilfield construction and maintenance tasks, or a range of scientific observation and sampling activities.

=== Operator requirements ===
- The operator must fit inside the suit, be able to move their limbs effectively, and be able to get out again.
- The operator must be able to reach and to operate electronics panels and life support systems, be able to jettison ballast, operate umbilical and thruster cable cutters.
- The operator must be physically, medically and psychologically fit for the work.

=== Hazards and failure modes ===
The primary structural failure modes of an ADS are buckling collapse in compression, leaks, and lockup of joints. Leaks and buckling in compression both cause a reduction in buoyancy. Joint leaks and locking of articulating joints may be reversible when pressure is reduced. Electrically ignited fire is also possible.

Systems failures may include loss of power, communications, or propulsion, or life-support systems failure, such as failure of scrubbing the carbon dioxide from the breathing air, or failure of internal temperature control. Recovery from most of these would be by aborting the dive and making an emergency ascent. Bailout to emergency breathing system and ditching of ballast to establish positive buoyancy may be necessary. If the ADS is tethered it can be lifted. The most dangerous consequence is catastrophic leakage, which is likely to be fatal.

There has been one fatal incident involving an ADS. A WASP was dropped 80 feet (25 m) in August 1999 due to a structural failure in a recently tested launch and recovery system, and the diver was killed by the impact with the launch platform. This is in the context of tens of thousands of operational man-hours by WASPs without serious incidents.

== Comparison with alternative technologies ==
Several advantages over ambient pressure diving are claimed, but dexterity is less. There are also advantages and disadvantages in comparison with remotely operated underwater vehicles (ROVs):

- No decompression is required. Decompression from saturation takes approximately 1 day per 30 msw plus 1 day, during which time the divers are unproductive. This is particularly expensive when the total dive time is relatively short.
- Consecutive dives can be made to any depths within the operating range. Saturation divers are very limited in safe excursion range from storage depth. An ADS depth excursions are limited only by maximum working depth.
- Lateral range is comparable with ROVs.
- Thrusters, when provided, can provide moderate mid-water and current capability.
- Manipulatory capacity and dexterity are better than ROVs. Less special tooling is required for most work. Depth perception of the diver is better than remote viewing via a ROV cameras.
- Deep applications are possible compared with ambient pressure diving. The industry-accepted maximum depth for routine saturation diving is 300 msw. ADS operations can go deeper. However, ROVs and crewed submersibles can go much deeper. Maximum depth capability for ROV and crewed submersibles is full ocean depth.

For some work the most effective method can be a combination of ADS and ROV; in other cases, ADS and ambient pressure diver.

== History ==
=== Early designs ===
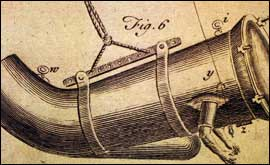
Jacob Rowe's copper diving dress, built in the 1710s

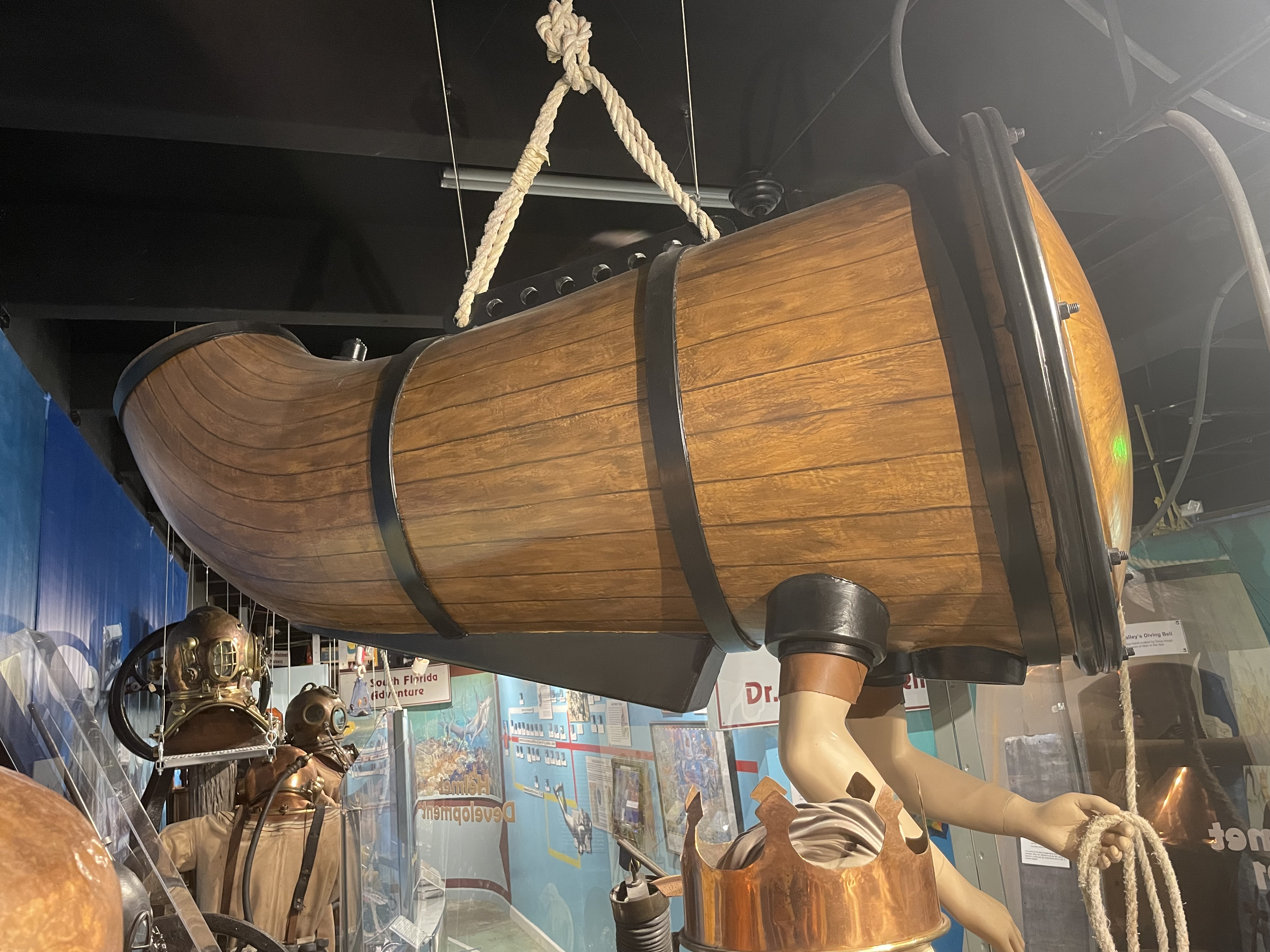
Modern replica on display at the History of Diving Museum, Florida

In 1715, the British inventor John Lethbridge constructed a "diving engine". Essentially a wooden barrel about 6 feet (1.8 m) in length with two holes for the diver's arms sealed with leather cuffs, and a 4-inch (100 mm) viewport of thick glass. It was reportedly used to dive as deep as 60 feet (18 m), and was used to salvage substantial quantities of silver from the wreck of the East Indiaman Vansittart, which had sunk in 1719 off the Cape Verde islands. A similar design made of copper was used by Jacob Rowe on the same salvage contract.

The first armored suit with real joints, designed as leather pieces with rings in the shape of a spring (also known as accordion joints), was designed by the Englishman W. H. Taylor in 1838. The diver's hands and feet were covered with leather. Taylor also devised a ballast tank attached to the suit that could be filled with water to attain negative buoyancy. While it was patented, the suit was never actually produced. It is considered that its weight and bulk would have rendered it nearly immobile underwater.

Lodner D. Phillips designed the first completely enclosed ADS in 1856. His design comprised a barrel-shaped upper torso with domed ends with ball and socket joints in the articulated arms and legs. The arms had joints at shoulder and elbow, and the legs at knee and hip. The suit included a ballast tank, a viewing port, entrance through a manhole cover on top, a hand-cranked propeller, and rudimentary manipulators at the ends of the arms. Breathing air was to be supplied from the surface via hose. There is no indication that Phillips's suit was ever constructed.

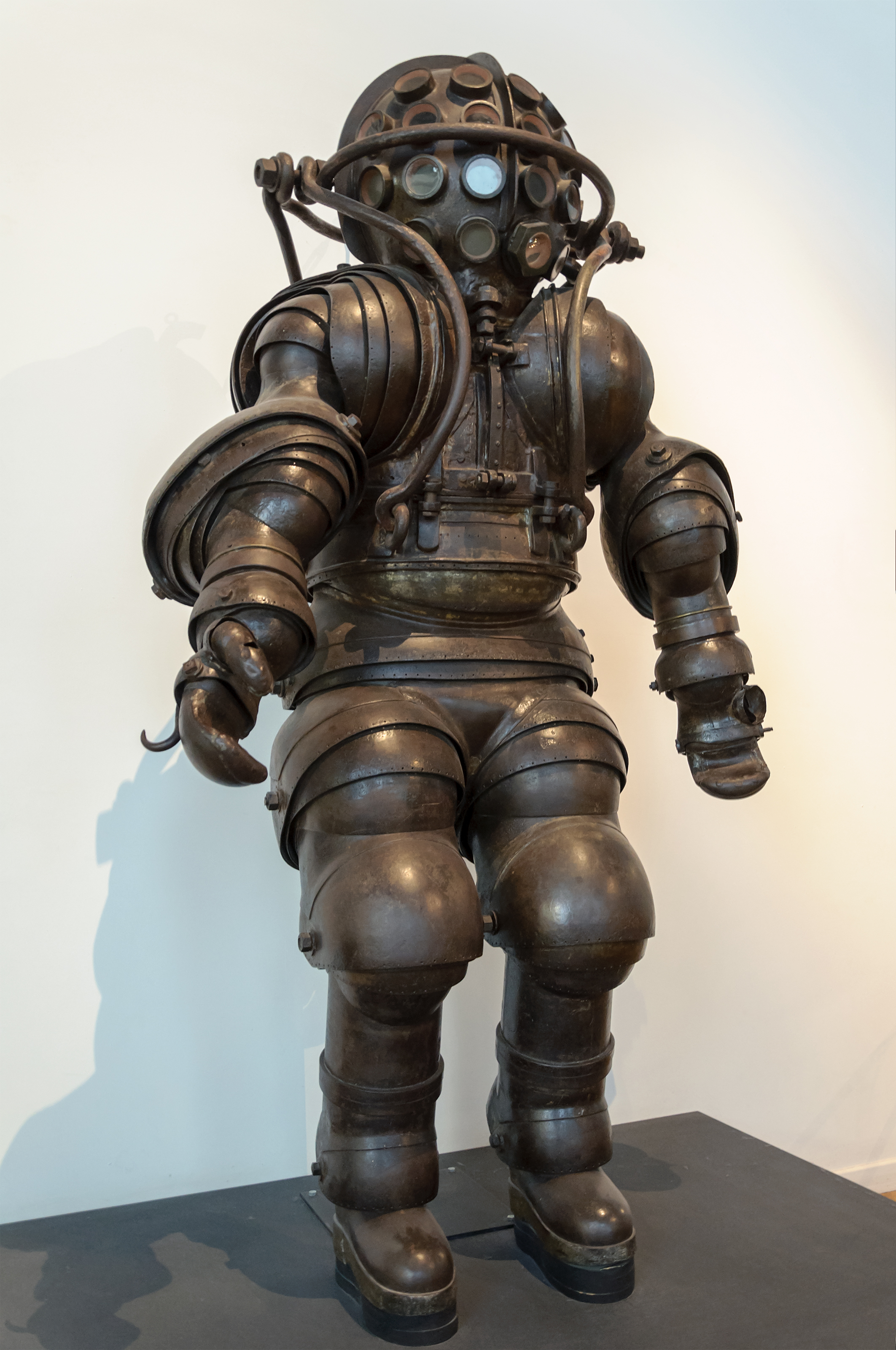
Suit built by Carmagnolle brothers in 1882 was the first anthropomorphic design.

The first properly anthropomorphic design of ADS, built by the Carmagnolle brothers of Marseille, France in 1882, featured rolling convolute joints consisting of closely fitting concentric spherical sections sealed by watertight cloth membranes. The suit had 22 of these joints: four in each leg, six in each arm, and two in the torso. The helmet had 25 individual 2-inch (50 mm) glass viewports spaced at the average separation of the human eyes. Weighing 830 pounds (380 kg), the Carmagnole ADS never worked properly and its joints never were entirely waterproof. It is now on display at the French National Navy Museum in Paris.

Another design was patented in 1894 by the inventors John Buchanan and Alexander Gordon from Melbourne, Australia. The construction was based on a frame of spiral wires covered with waterproof material. The design was improved by Alexander Gordon by attaching the suit to the helmet and other parts and incorporating jointed radius rods in the limbs. This resulted in a flexible suit which could withstand high pressure. The suit was manufactured by British firm Siebe Gorman and trialed in Scotland in 1898.

US Navy 1913 ADS

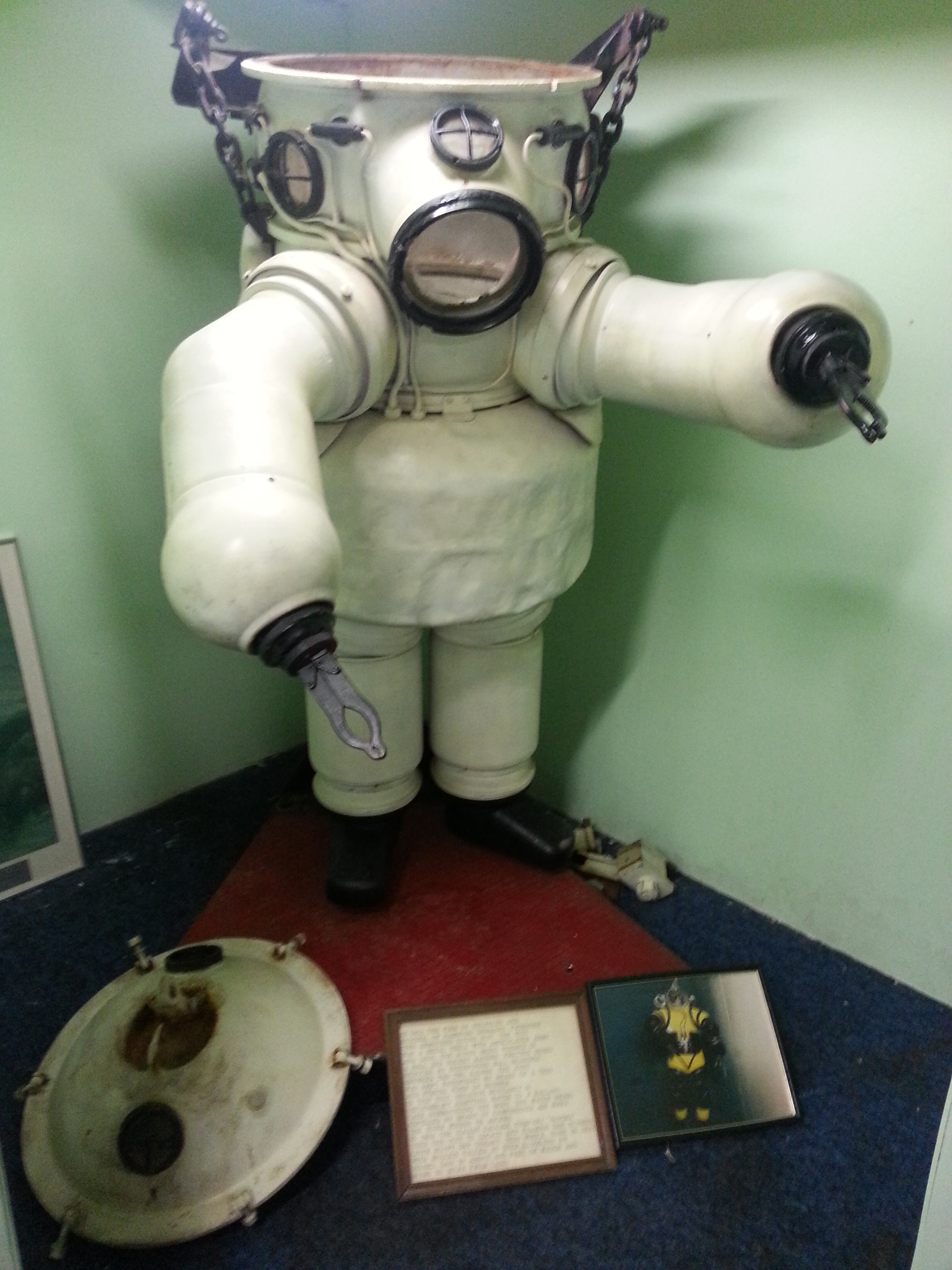
1913 US Navy ADS at Man in the Sea Museum, Panama City, FL with the lobster claws

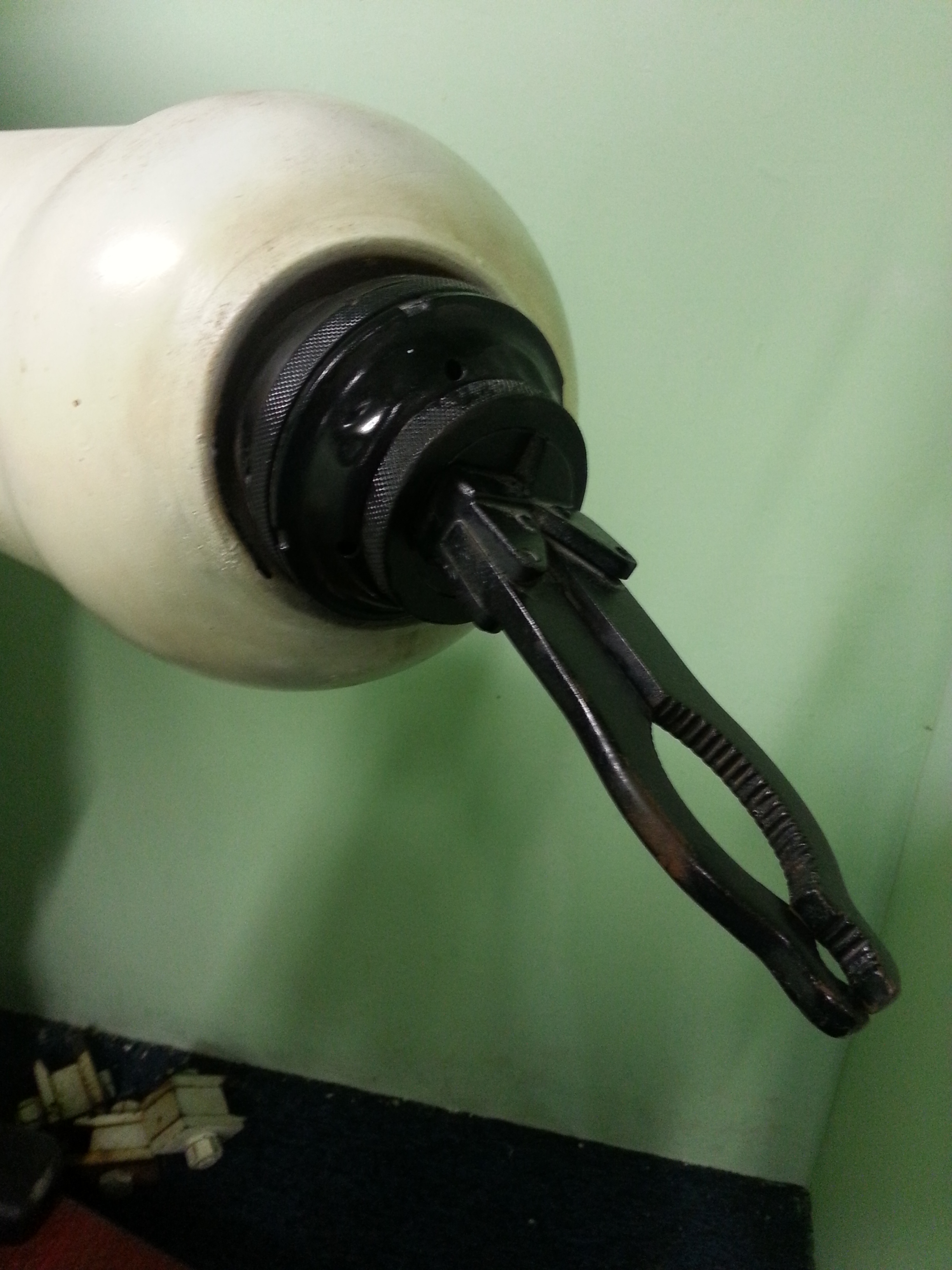
Close up view of two-jawed grasper and pitch-yaw wrist joint on 1913 US Navy armored diving suit

The American designer Macduffee constructed the first suit to use ball bearings to provide joint movement in 1914; it was tested in New York to a depth of 214 feet (65 m), but was not very successful. A year later, Harry L. Bowdoin of Bayonne, New Jersey, made an improved ADS with oil-filled rotary joints. Each joint has a small duct to its interior to allow equalization of pressure. The suit was designed to have eighteen joints: four in each arm and leg, and one in each thumb. Four viewing ports and a chest-mounted lamp were intended to assist underwater vision. There is no evidence that Bowdoin's suit was ever built, or that it would have worked if it had been.

Atmospheric diving suits built by Neufeldt and Kuhnke of Germany were used during the salvage of gold and silver bullion from the wreck of the British ship SS Egypt, an 8,000 ton P&O liner that had sunk in May 1922. The suit was relegated to duties as an observation chamber at the wreck's depth of 560 feet (170 m), and was successfully used to direct mechanical grabs which opened up the bullion storage. In 1917, Benjamin F. Leavitt of Traverse City, Michigan, dived on the SS Pewabic which sank to a depth of 182 feet (55 m) in Lake Huron in 1865, salvaging 350 tons of copper ore. In 1923, he went on to salvage the wreck of the British schooner Cape Horn which lay in 220 feet (67 m) of water off Pichidangui, Chile, salvaging $600,000 worth of copper. Leavitt's suit was of his own design and construction. The most innovative aspect of Leavitt's suit was the fact that it was completely self-contained and needed no umbilical, the breathing mixture being supplied from a tank mounted on the back of the suit. The breathing apparatus incorporated a scrubber and an oxygen regulator and could last for up to a full hour.

In 1924 the Reichsmarine tested the second generation of the Neufeldt and Kuhnke suit to 530 feet (160 m), but limb movement was very difficult and the joints were judged not to be fail-safe, in that if they were to fail, there was a possibility that the suit's integrity would be violated. However, these suits were used by German armored divers during World War II and were later taken by the Western Allies after the war.

From 1929 to 1931 two atmospheric pressure one-person submersible "suits" designed by Carl Wiley were used in the successful salvage of the steamship Islander which sank in the Stevens Passage near Juneau, Alaska on 15 August 1901, with a large amount of gold dust in the cargo. The suits operated at a maximum depth of 365 feet (111 m). They were each equipped with a mechanical arm with a grasping claw at the end operated from inside the suit. The suits were capable of traversing a hard, reasonably smooth substrate on wheels, and were used to place the steel cables used to raise the wreck by tidal lift (with an 18-foot or 5-metre tide range) under a catamaran barge in stages, while it was towed to shallow water. The suits had electrical power, and the diver/pilot used an oxygen rebreather. These suits have also been described as diving bells and observation chambers, as they do not match the usual definition of an atmospheric diving suit, but they were more than just observation chambers, being capable of work, and were independently mobile, so do not match the usual definition of a diving bell either. They were an unusual type of tethered crewed submersible.

In 1952, Alfred A. Mikalow constructed an ADS using ball and socket joints, specifically for the purpose of locating and salvaging sunken treasure. The suit was reported to be capable of diving to 1,000 feet (300 m) depth and was successfully used to dive on the wreck of SS City of Rio de Janeiro near Fort Point, San Francisco at a depth of 330 feet (100 m). Mikalow's suit had various interchangeable instruments which could be mounted on the end of the arms in place of the original manipulators. It carried seven 90-cubic foot high pressure cylinders to provide breathing gas and control buoyancy. The ballast compartment covered the gas cylinders. For communication, the suit used hydrophones.

=== The modern suit ===
==== Peress' Tritonia ====
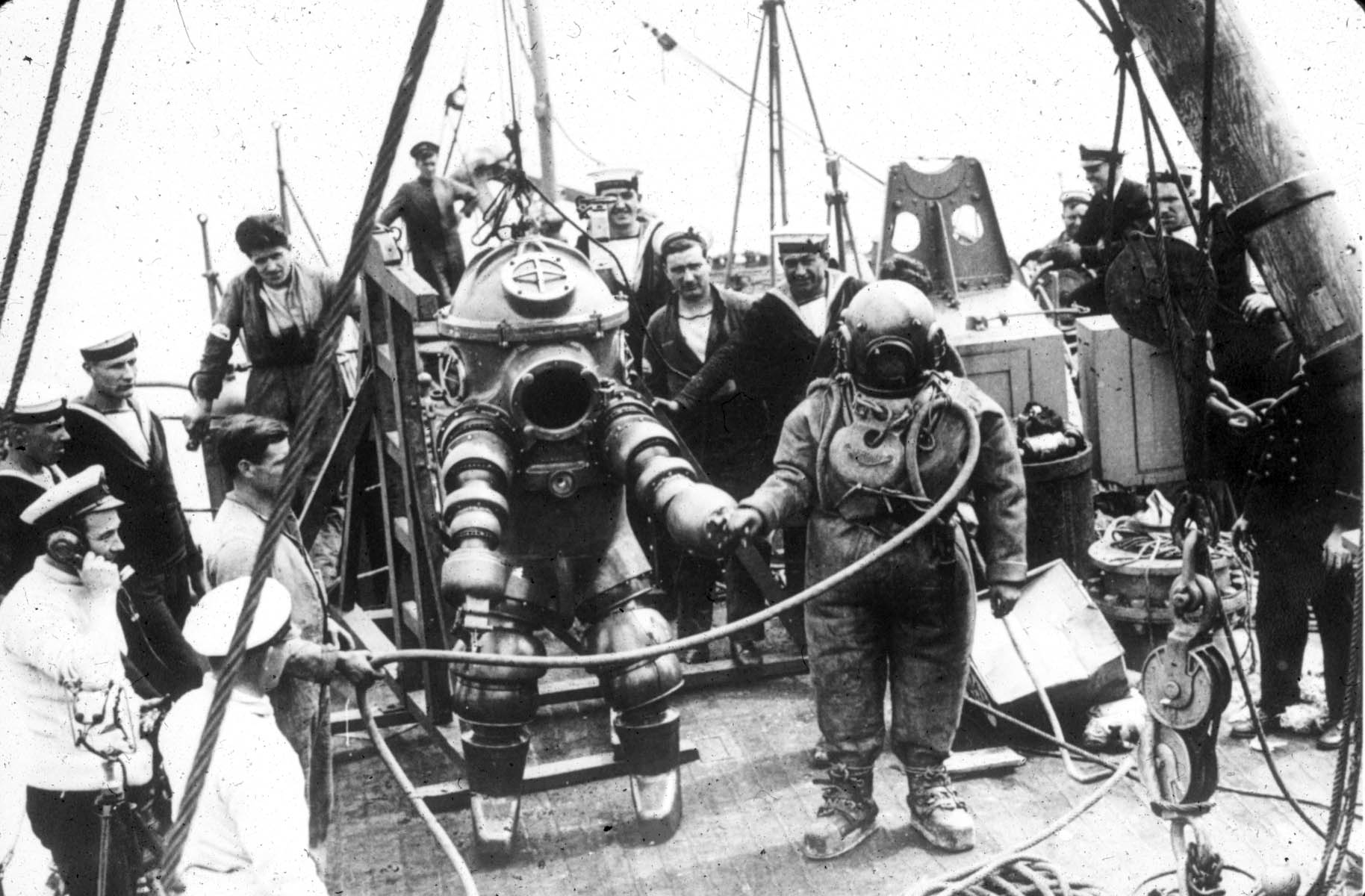
Two divers, one wearing the "Tritonia" ADS and the other standard diving dress, preparing to explore the wreck of the RMS Lusitania, 1935

Although various atmospheric suits had been developed during the Victorian era, none of these suits overcame the basic design problem of constructing a joint which would remain flexible and watertight at depth without seizing up under pressure.

Pioneering British diving engineer, Joseph Salim Peress, invented the first truly usable atmospheric diving suit, the Tritonia, in 1932 and was later involved in the construction of the famous JIM suit. Having a natural talent for engineering design, he challenged himself to construct an ADS that would keep divers dry and at atmospheric pressure, even at great depth. In 1918, Peress began working for WG Tarrant at Byfleet, United Kingdom, where he was given the space and tools to develop his ideas about constructing an ADS. His first attempt was an immensely complex prototype machined from solid stainless steel.

In 1923, Peress was asked to design a suit for salvage work on the wreck of SS Egypt which had sunk in the English Channel. He declined, on the grounds that his prototype suit was too heavy for a diver to handle easily, but was encouraged by the request to begin work on a new suit using lighter materials. By 1929 he believed he had solved the weight problem, by using cast magnesium instead of steel, and had also managed to improve the design of the suit's joints by using a trapped cushion of oil to keep the surfaces moving smoothly. The oil was virtually non-compressible and readily displaceable, which would allow the limb joints to move freely even under great pressure. Peress claimed the Tritonia suit could function at 1,200 ft (370 m), where the pressure was 520 psi (35 atm), although this was never proven.

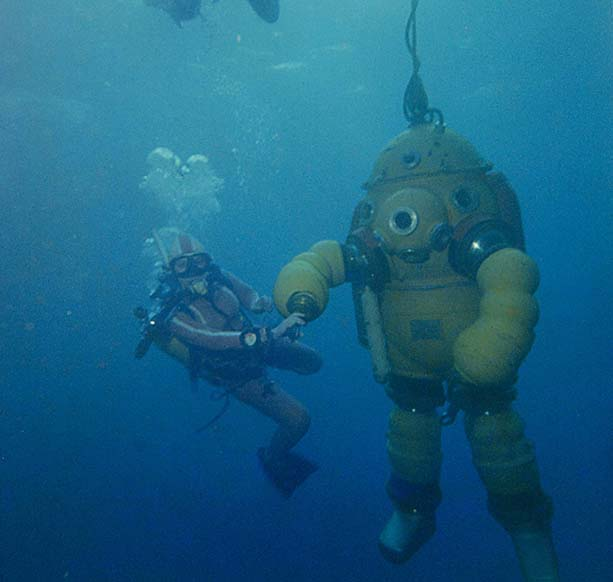
Luciana Civico ascending from the dive of the depth record at 269 feet (82 m) on 11 November 1962 in the vicinity of Capo Miseno in the Gulf of Pozzuoli tightens the pincer of the diving suit operated by the s. Lieutenant Benito Velardi

In 1930, Peress revealed the Tritonia suit. By May it had completed trials and was publicly demonstrated in a tank at Byfleet. In September Peress' assistant Jim Jarret dived in the suit to a depth of 404 ft (123 m) in Loch Ness. The suit performed perfectly, the joints proving resistant to pressure and moving freely even at depth. The suit was offered to the Royal Navy which turned it down, stating that Navy divers never needed to descend below 300 ft (90 m). In October 1935 Jarret made a successful deep dive to more than 300 ft (90 m) on the wreck of the RMS Lusitania off south Ireland, followed by a shallower dive to 200 feet (60 m) in the English Channel in 1937 after which, due to lack of interest, the Tritonia suit was retired.

The development in atmospheric pressure suits stagnated in the 1940s through 1960s, as efforts were concentrated on solving the problems of deep diving by dealing with the physiological problems of ambient pressure diving instead of avoiding them by isolating the diver from the pressure. Although the advances in ambient pressure diving (in particular, with scuba gear) were significant, the limitations brought renewed interest to the development of the ADS in the late 1960s.

==== The JIM suit ====
The Tritonia suit spent about 30 years in an engineering company's warehouse in Glasgow, where it was discovered, with Peress' help, by two partners in the British firm Underwater Marine Equipment, Mike Humphrey and Mike Borrow, in the mid-1960s. UMEL would later classify Peress' suit as the "A.D.S Type I", a designation system that would be continued by the company for later models. In 1969, Peress was asked to become a consultant to the new company created to develop the JIM suit, named in honour of the diver Jim Jarret.

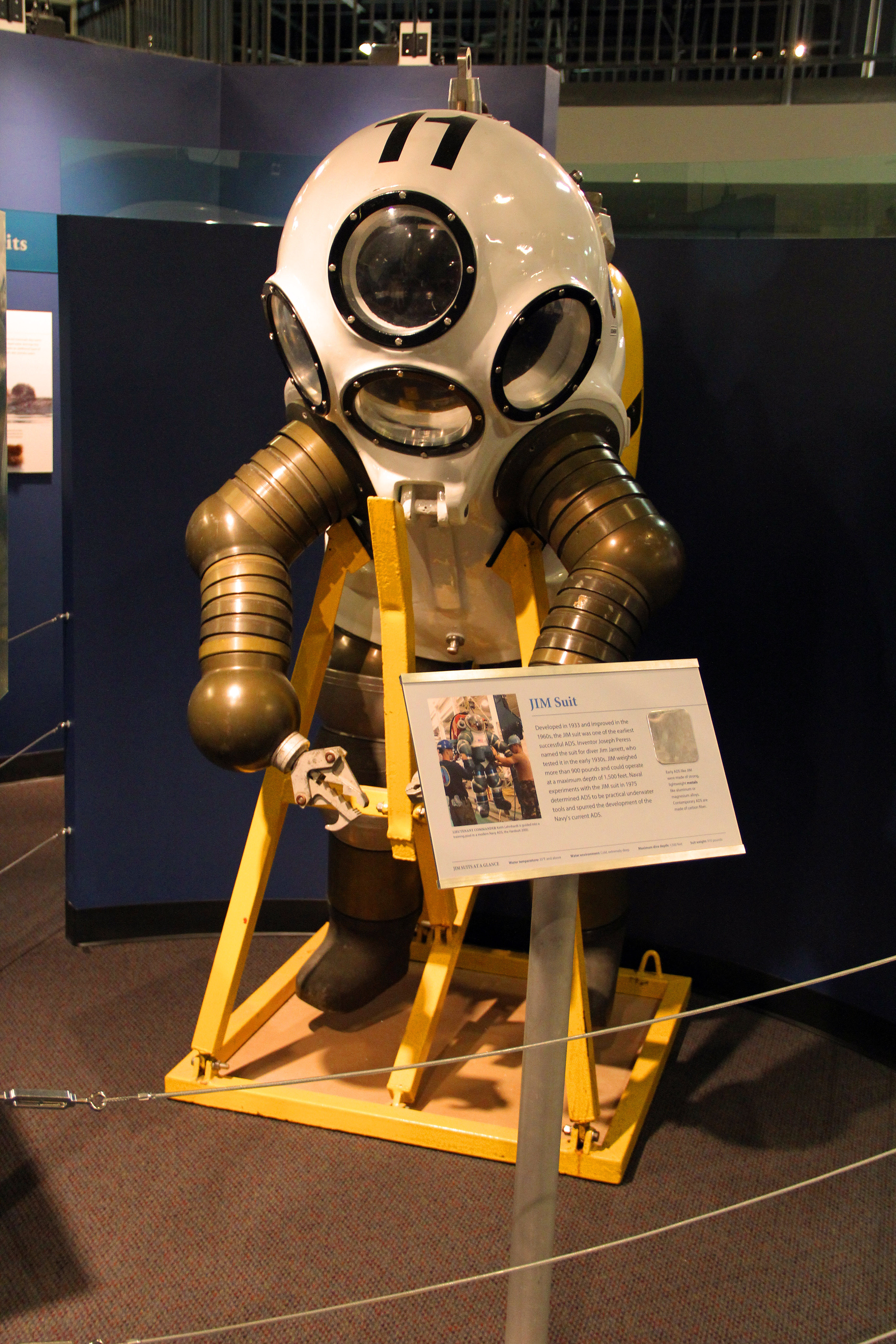
JIM suit in Naval Undersea Museum

The first JIM suit was completed in November 1971 and underwent sea trials from HMS Reclaim in early 1972. In 1976, it set a record of five hours and 59 minutes for the longest working dive below 490 feet (150 m), at a depth of 905 feet (276 m). The first JIM suits were constructed from cast magnesium for its high strength-to-weight ratio and weighed approximately 1,100 pounds (500 kg) in air, including the occupant. They were 6 feet 6 inches (1.98 m) in height and had a maximum operating depth of 1,500 feet (460 m). The suit had a positive buoyancy of 15 to 50 pounds-force (67 to 222 N). Ballast was attached to the suit's front and could be jettisoned from inside, allowing the suit to ascend to the surface at approximately 100 feet per minute (30 m/min). The suit also incorporated a communication link and an umbilical connection that could be released by the diver. The original JIM suit had eight annular oil-supported universal joints, one at each hip, knee, shoulder and lower arm. The JIM operator received air through an oral/nasal mask that attached to a lung-powered scrubber that had a life support duration of approximately 72 hours. Operations in arctic conditions with water temperatures of 28.9 °F (−1.7 °C) for over 5 hours were successfully carried out using woolen thermal protection and neoprene boots. In 86 °F (30 °C) water the suit was reported to be uncomfortably hot during heavy work.

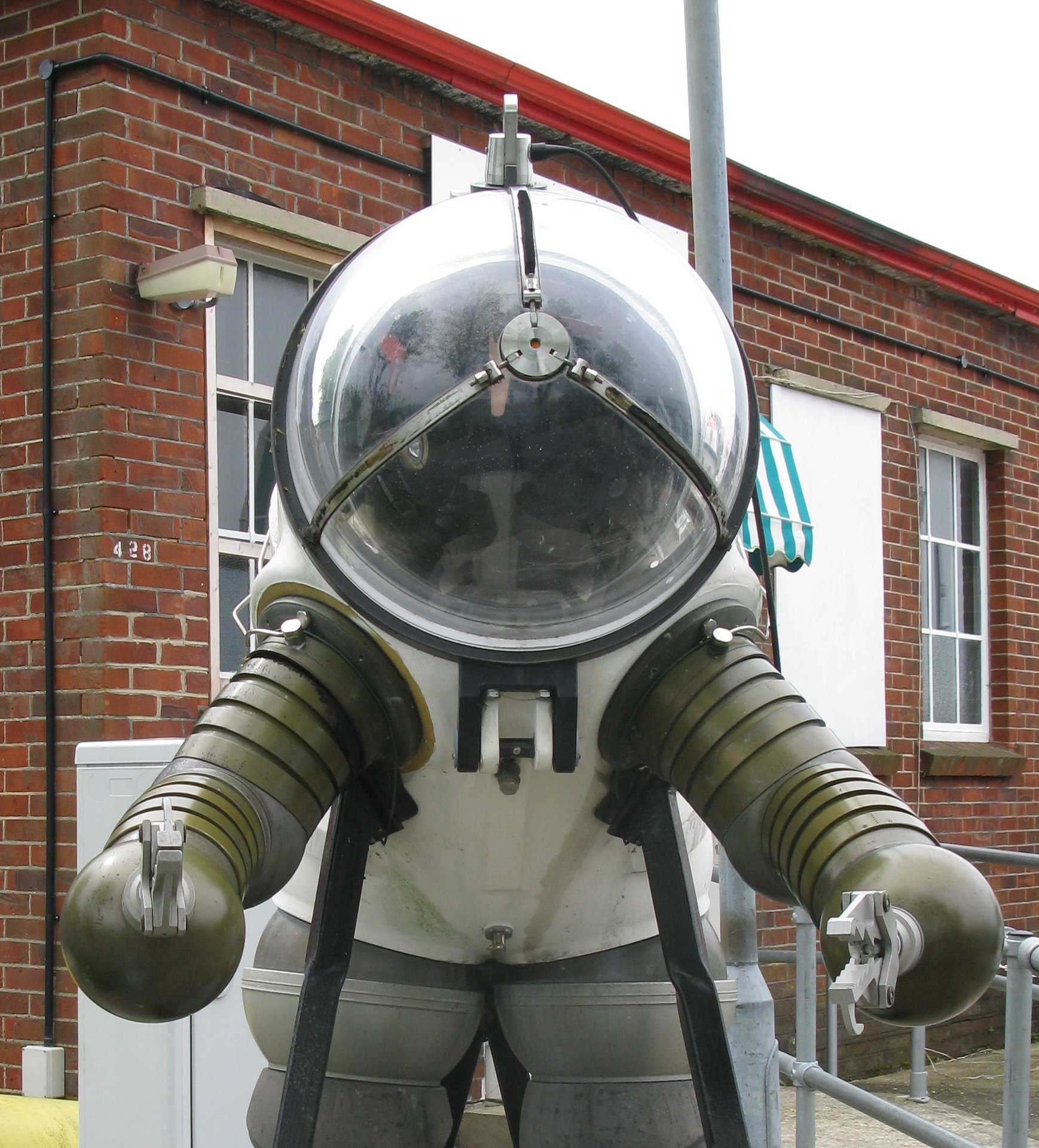
A JIM suit on display at the Royal Navy Submarine Museum, Gosport

As technology improved and operational knowledge grew, Oceaneering upgraded their fleet of JIMs. The magnesium construction was replaced with glass-reinforced plastic (GRP) and the single joints with segmented ones, each allowing seven degrees of motion, and when added together giving the operator a very great range of motion. In addition, the four-port domed top of the suit was replaced by a transparent acrylic dome as used on WASP, which provided a much better field of vision. Trials were also carried out by the Ministry of Defence on a flying Jim suit powered from the surface through an umbilical cable. This resulted in a hybrid suit with the ability of working on the sea bed as well as mid water.

In addition to upgrades to the JIM design, other variations of the original suit were constructed. The first, named the SAM Suit (designated A.D.S III), was a completely aluminium model. A smaller and lighter suit, it was more anthropomorphic than the original JIMs and was depth-rated to 1,000 feet (300 m). Attempts were made to limit corrosion by the use of a chromic anodizing coating applied to the arm and leg joints, which gave them an unusual green color. The SAM suit stood at 6 feet 3 inches (1.91 m) in height, and had a life support duration of 20 hours. Only three SAM suits would be produced by UMEL before the design was shelved. The second, named the JAM suit (designated A.D.S IV), was constructed of glass-reinforced plastic (GRP) and was depth-rated for around 2,000 feet (610 m).

=== WASP ===
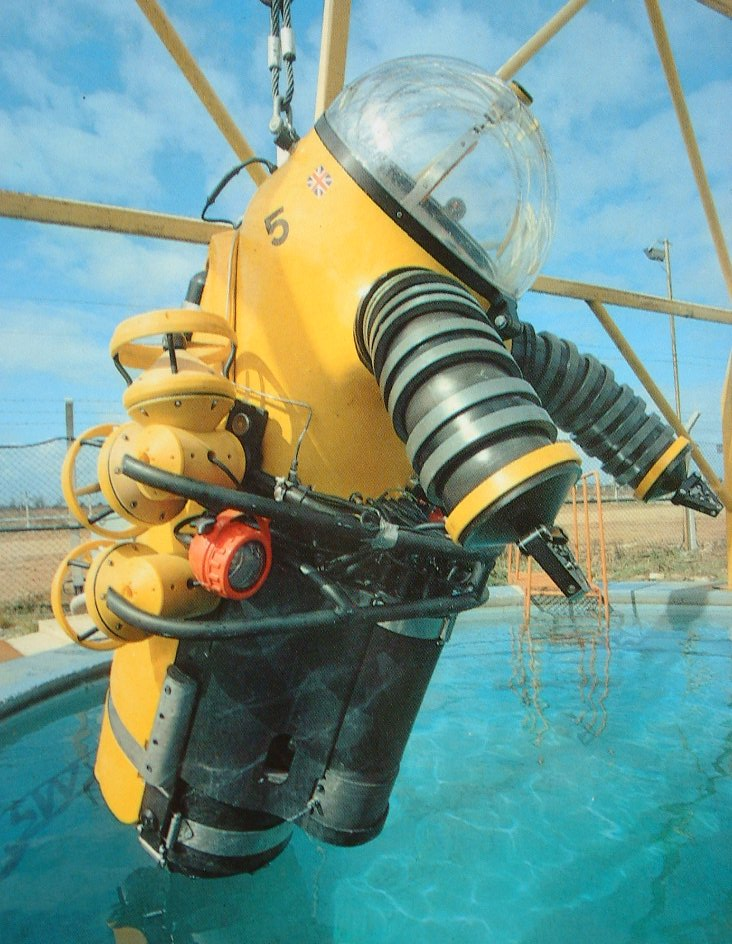
WASP at the OSEL Testing tank Great Yarmouth, UK

The WASP atmospheric diving system is partway between a one-person submersible and an atmospheric diving suit, in that there are articulated arms which contain and are moved by the operator's arms, but the operator's legs are contained in a rigid housing. Mobility is provided by two vertical and two horizontal foot-switch controlled electrical marine thrusters. Operating depth was quoted as 2,300 feet (700 m)

WASP is 84 inches (2.1 m) high, 42 inches (1.1 m) wide, and 34 inches (0.86 m) front to back. Ballasted weight in air approximately 2,200 pounds (1,000 kg), for neutral buoyancy in water, but buoyancy can be increased by up to 35 pounds (16 kg) during operation, and ballast can be jettisoned in an emergency. WASP is transported on a support frame.

== Current suits ==
Exosuit

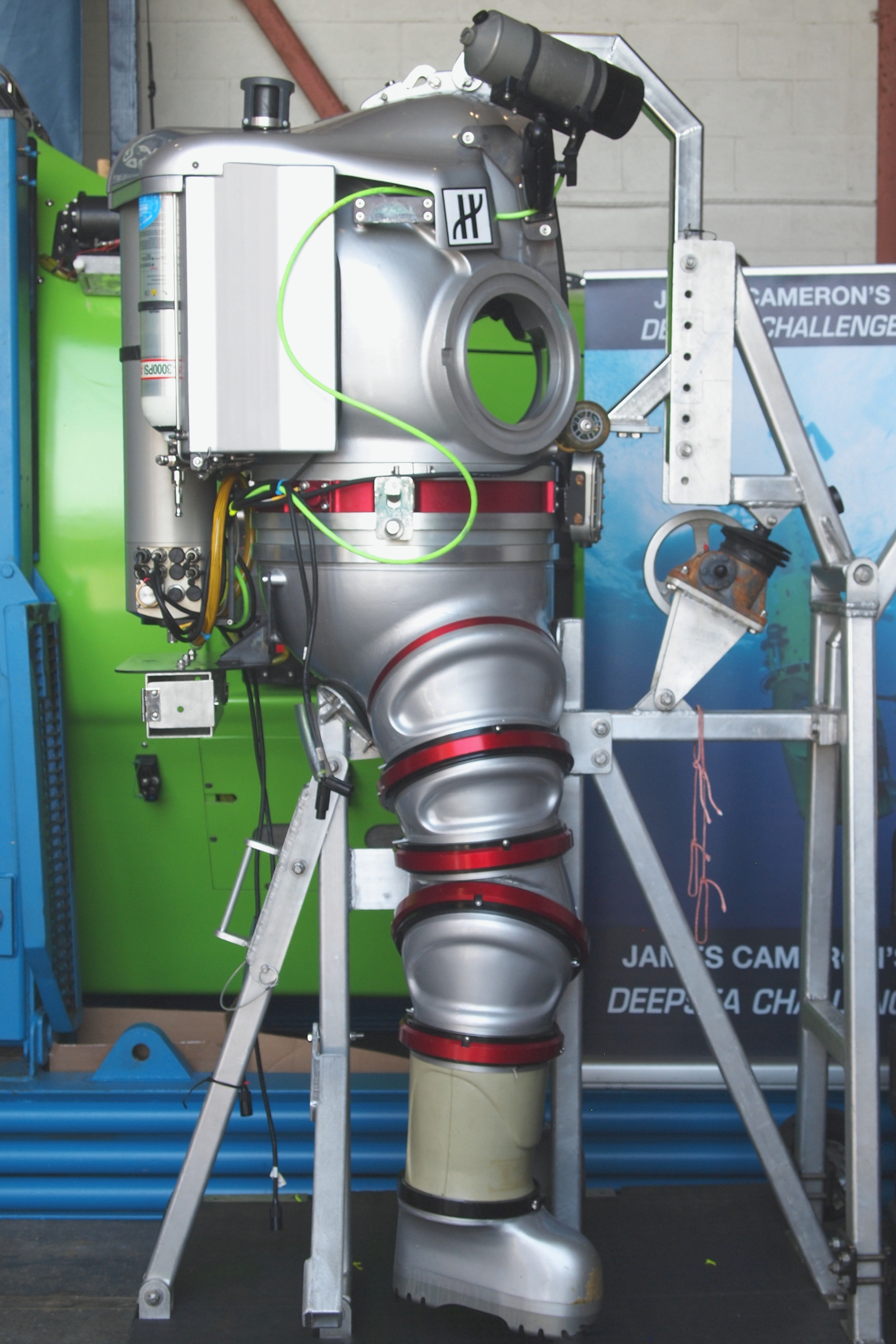
Side view of Exosuit

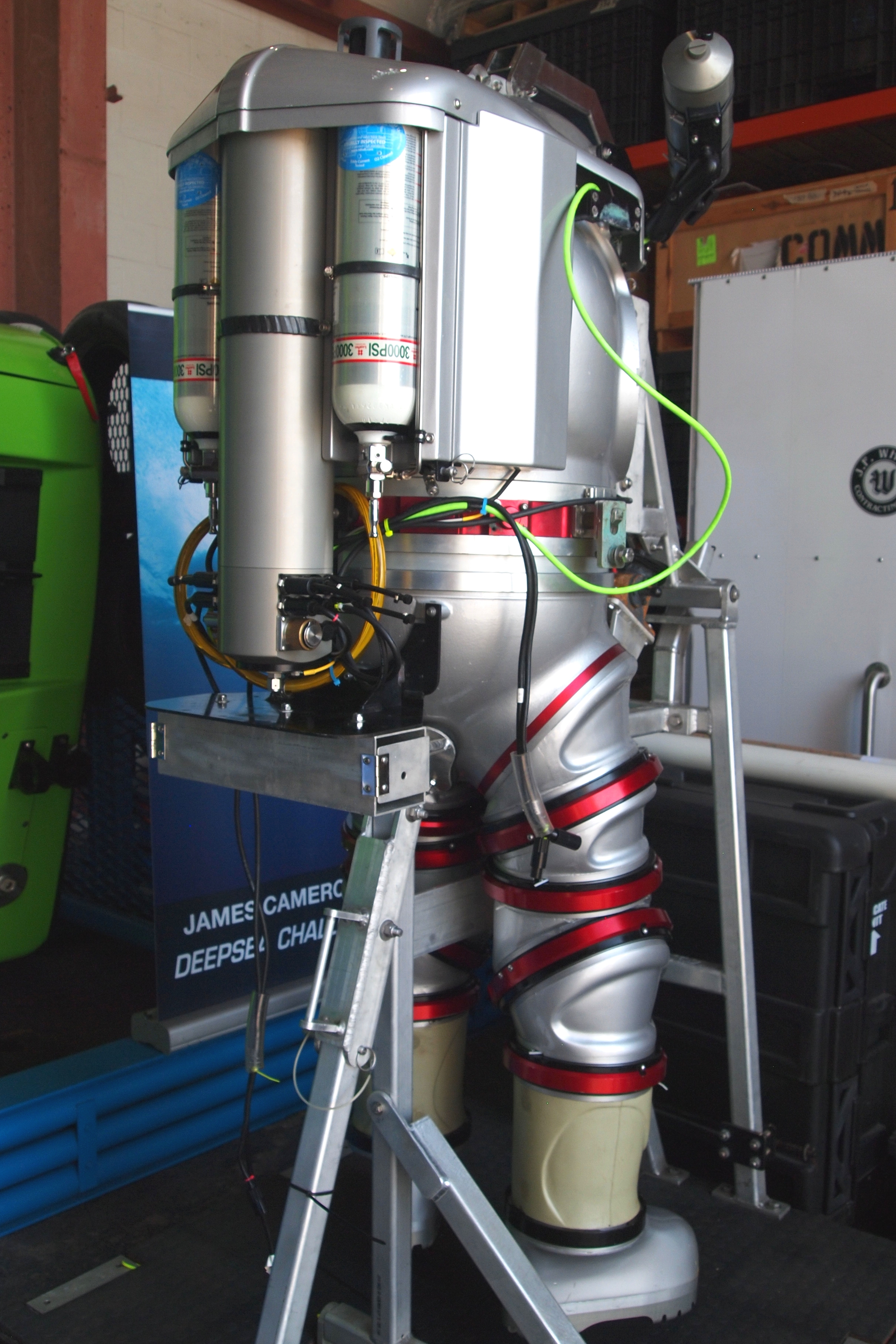
Back view of Exosuit

In 1987, the "Newtsuit" was developed by the Canadian engineer Phil Nuytten, and a version was put into production as the "Hardsuit" by Hardsuits International. The Newtsuit is constructed to function like a 'submarine you can wear', allowing the diver to work at normal atmospheric pressure even at depths of over 1,000 feet (300 m). Made of wrought aluminium, it had fully articulated joints so the diver can move more easily underwater. The life support system provides 6–8 hours of air, with an emergency back-up supply of an additional 48 hours. The Hardsuit was used to salvage the bell from the wreck of the SS Edmund Fitzgerald in 1995. The latest version of the Hardsuit designed by Oceanworks, the "Quantum 2", uses higher power commercially available ROV thrusters for better reliability and more power as well as an atmospheric monitoring system to monitor the environmental conditions in the cabin. A more recent design by Nuytten is the Exosuit, a relatively lightweight and low powered suit intended for marine research. It was first used in 2014 at the Bluewater and Antikythera underwater research expeditions.

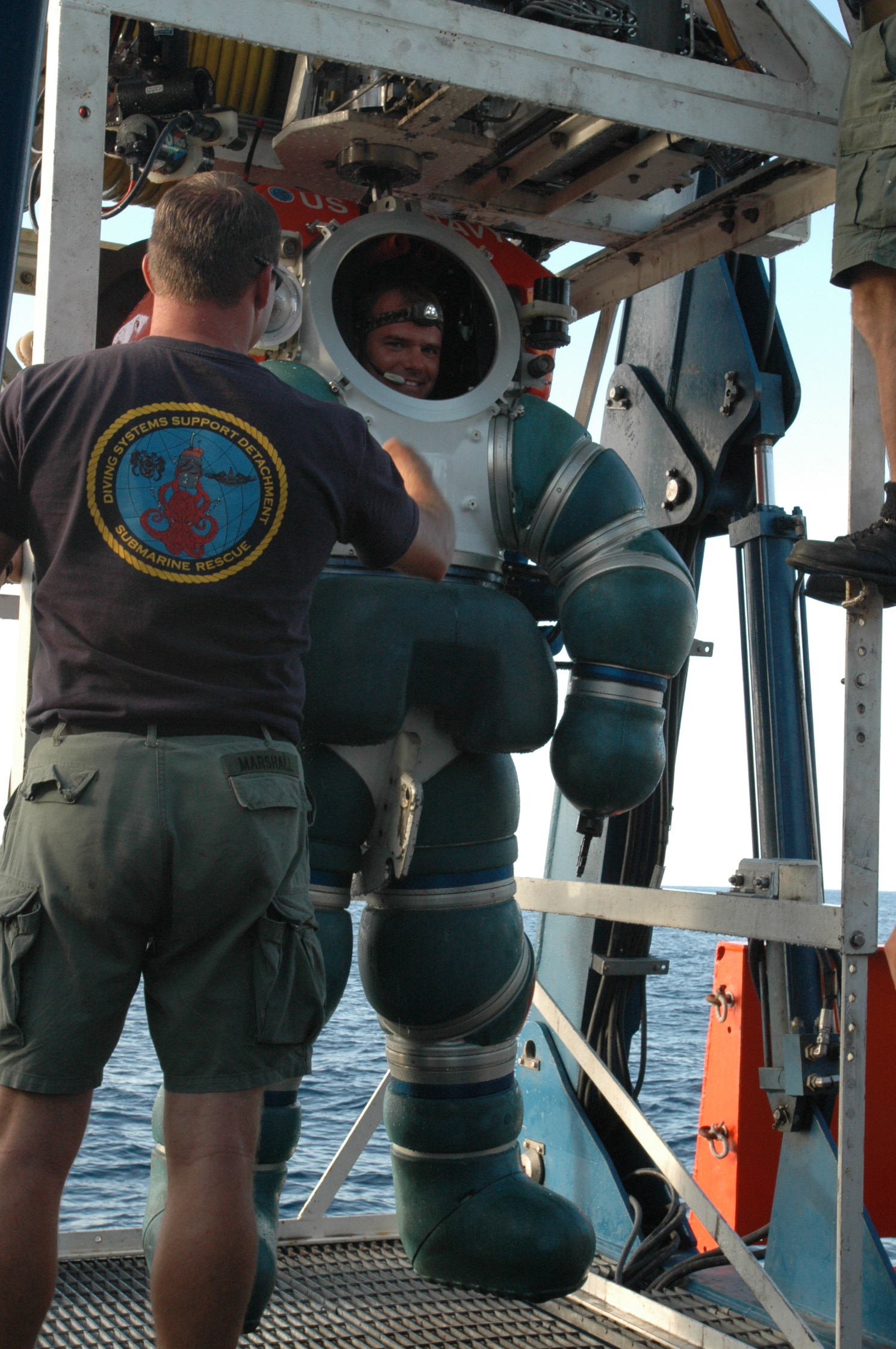
US Navy ADS 2000 on launch and recovery platform after a certification dive in August 2006

The ADS 2000 was developed jointly with OceanWorks International and the US Navy in 1997, as an evolution of the Hardsuit to meet US Navy requirements. The ADS 2000 provides increased depth capability for the US Navy's Submarine Rescue Program. Manufactured from forged T6061 aluminum alloy, it uses an advanced articulating joint design based on the Hardsuit joints. Capable of operating in up to 2,000 feet (610 m) of seawater for a normal mission of up to six hours, it has a self-contained, automatic life support system. Additionally, the integrated dual thruster system allows the pilot to navigate easily underwater. It became fully operational and certified by the US Navy off southern California on 1 August 2006, when Chief Navy Diver Daniel Jackson submerged to 2,000 feet (610 m).

From the project's beginning until 2011, the US navy spent $113 million on the ADS 2000.

Atmospheric Diving System (ADS 2000)

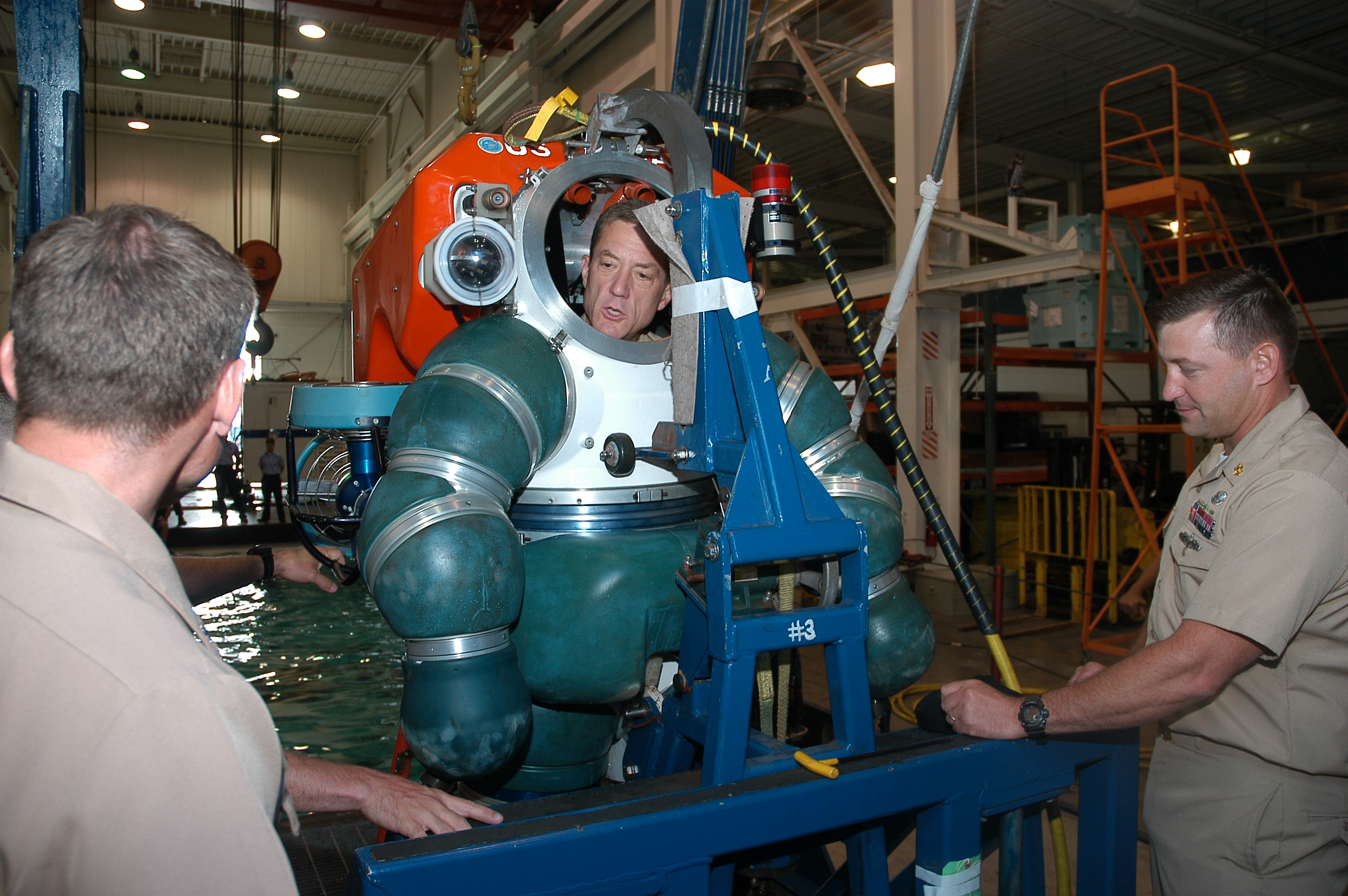
Atmospheric Diving System at the Naval Reserve Deep Submergence Unit Detachment at Naval Air Station North Island

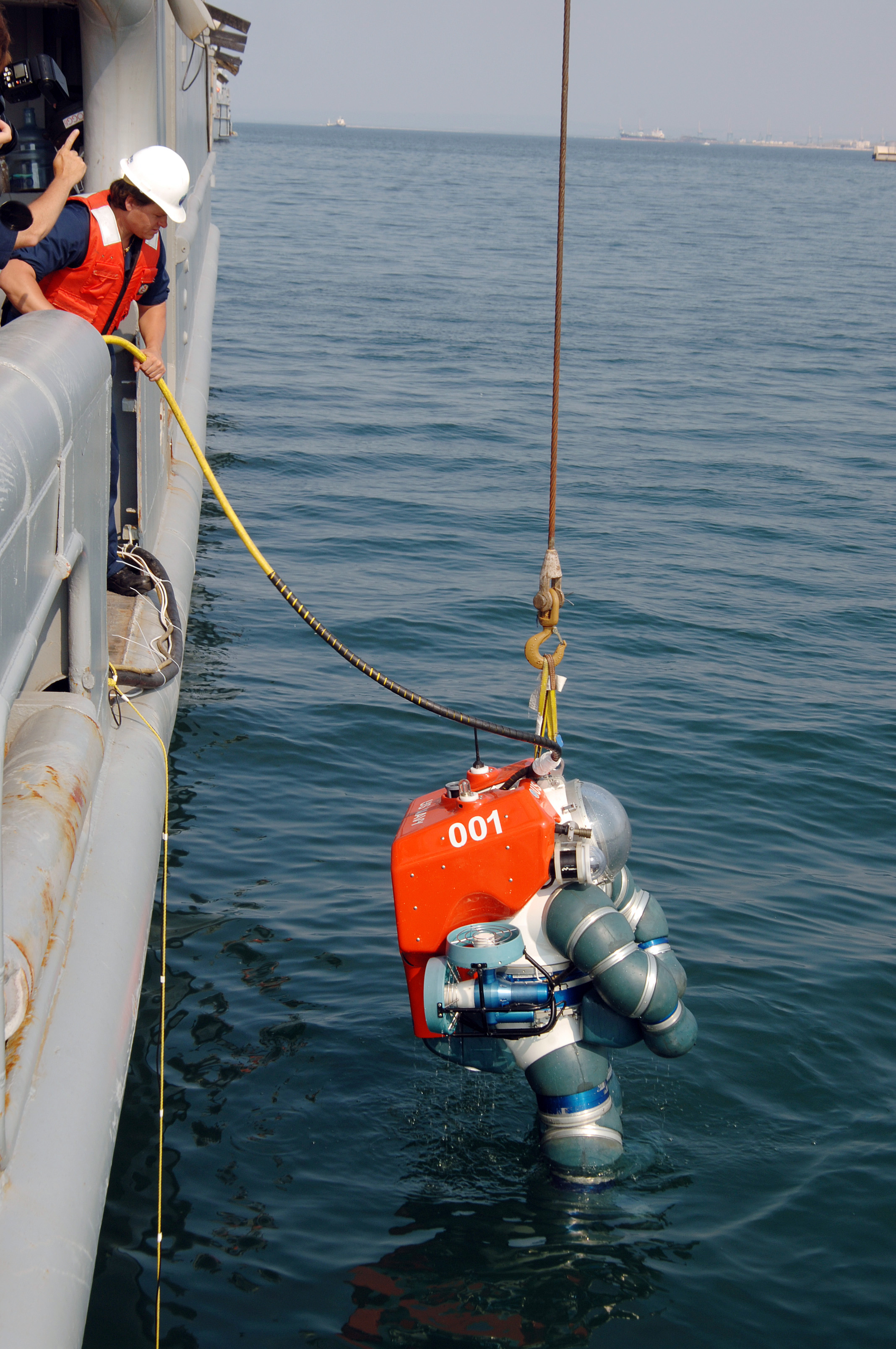
Atmospheric Diving System lowered into the water from the salvage ship USNS Grasp (T-ARS-51)

== See also ==
- Diving suit – Garment or device designed to protect a diver from the underwater environment
- Human factors in diving equipment design – Influence of the interaction between the user and the equipment on design
- Space suit – Garment worn to protect a human in space
- Submersible – Small watercraft able to navigate under water
