= JIM suit =

Type of atmospheric diving suit

JIM Suit
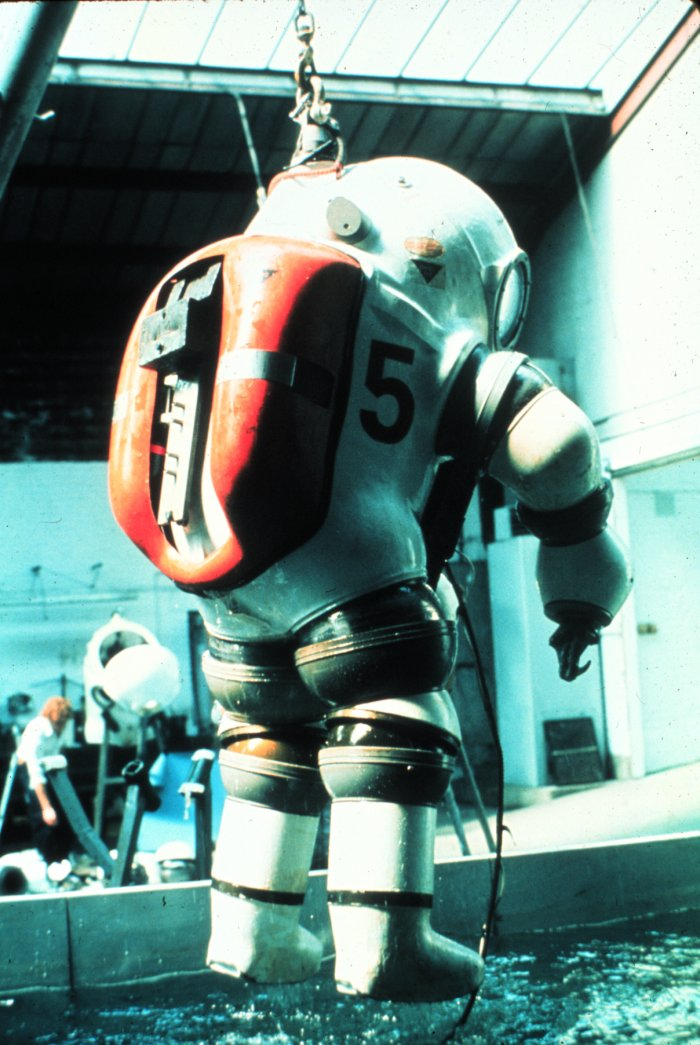
- A JIM suit used by NOAA is recovered from the water
- Other names: Atmospheric diving suit
- Uses: Underwater diving
- Inventor: Mike Humphrey and Mike Borrow
- Manufacturer: Underwater Marine Equipment Ltd
- Related items: Atmospheric diving suit

The JIM suit is an atmospheric diving suit (ADS), which is designed to maintain an interior pressure of one atmosphere despite exterior pressures, eliminating the majority of physiological dangers associated with deep diving. Because there is no need for special gas mixtures, nor is there danger of nitrogen narcosis or decompression sickness (the 'bends'); the occupant does not need to decompress when returning to the surface. It was invented in 1969 by Mike Humphrey and Mike Borrow, partners in the English firm Underwater Marine Equipment Ltd (UMEL), assisted by Joseph Salim Peress, whose Tritonia diving suit acted as their main inspiration. The suit was named after Jim Jarrett, Peress' chief diver.

== History ==
The petrochemical industry was unwilling to finance their research, but a grant was obtained from the British government, and a new company, DHB Construction (for Dennison, Hibberd and Borrow), was formed to develop the suit. The first JIM suit was completed in November 1971 and underwent initial trials aboard HMS Reclaim in early 1972. Two dives were conducted to depths in excess of 400 ft (120 m), and were limited only by the depth of the ambient divers providing support. Further development and testing continued until March 4, 1974, when Mike Humphrey conducted a chamber dive to the equivalent of 1,000 ft (300 m). The US Navy Experimental Diving Unit conducted tests in 1976.

In spite of the successful tests, the offshore petroleum industry still expressed little interest in the suit and it was not until 1975, when Oceaneering acquired DHB Construction and exclusive rights to the application of JIM suits in the oilfields, that the suit achieved success. This did not however please the British government, who after contributing money to the suit's development, did not want to see it being "given" to an American company over a British one. However, at the time, British diving concerns, most notably 2W, doubted the suit's abilities and therefore passed on purchasing the operating rights.

Its first commercial deployment was in 1974, when JIM suits were used in the recovery of lost oil tanker anchor chains in a Canary Islands harbor. In 1976 the JIM suit was used for a series of four dives on PanArtic's Hecla M25 well which were made through a hole cut in an ice floe 16 feet (4.9 m) thick, on which the rig was positioned, the first dive setting a record for the longest working dive below 490 feet (150 m), five hours and 59 minutes at a depth of 905 feet (276 m). In 1979, oceanographer Sylvia Earle set a human depth record of 1,250 feet (381 m) using a JIM suit.

The Arctic dives of 1976 proved that the JIM was capable of performing oilfield operations in very cold and very deep water; the average water temperature at the wellhead was measured at −1.6 °C (29.1 °F), while the average internal suit temperature was about 10 °C (50 °F). The operators needed no more than a heavy woolen sweater for thermal protection. The following year the JIM suit was used on over 35 jobs with an average duration of over two hours and in depths varying from 300 to 1,130 ft (91 to 344 m), and by 1981, 19 JIM suits had been produced.

The JIM suit and its variations enjoyed great success in the offshore oil industry for many years, although their effectiveness was hampered by the unwillingness of oil companies to install walkways around submerged sections of oil platforms. An experimental thruster pack that would connect to the existing JIM models was designed, but the suit gradually fell out of use with Oceaneering as their new WASP suit, a mid-water vehicle, became the favourite of contractors. The JIMs were still used by the company during the 1980s, including in a joint SAM and WASP recovery of a Wellington Bomber from Loch Ness in 1986, and were often used as back-up standby units for the rapidly advancing WASP suit. By 1990, the JIM suit was no longer commercially operated. Today, some of them may be viewed at museums across the world, along with many lightweight replica versions.

The JIM Suit is, perhaps, best known to the general public for its appearance in the James Bond film For Your Eyes Only, although it played a larger role in the 1989 sci-fi/horror film DeepStar Six.

For many years, a replica of the JIM suit was on display at the National Aquarium in Baltimore.

== Specifications ==
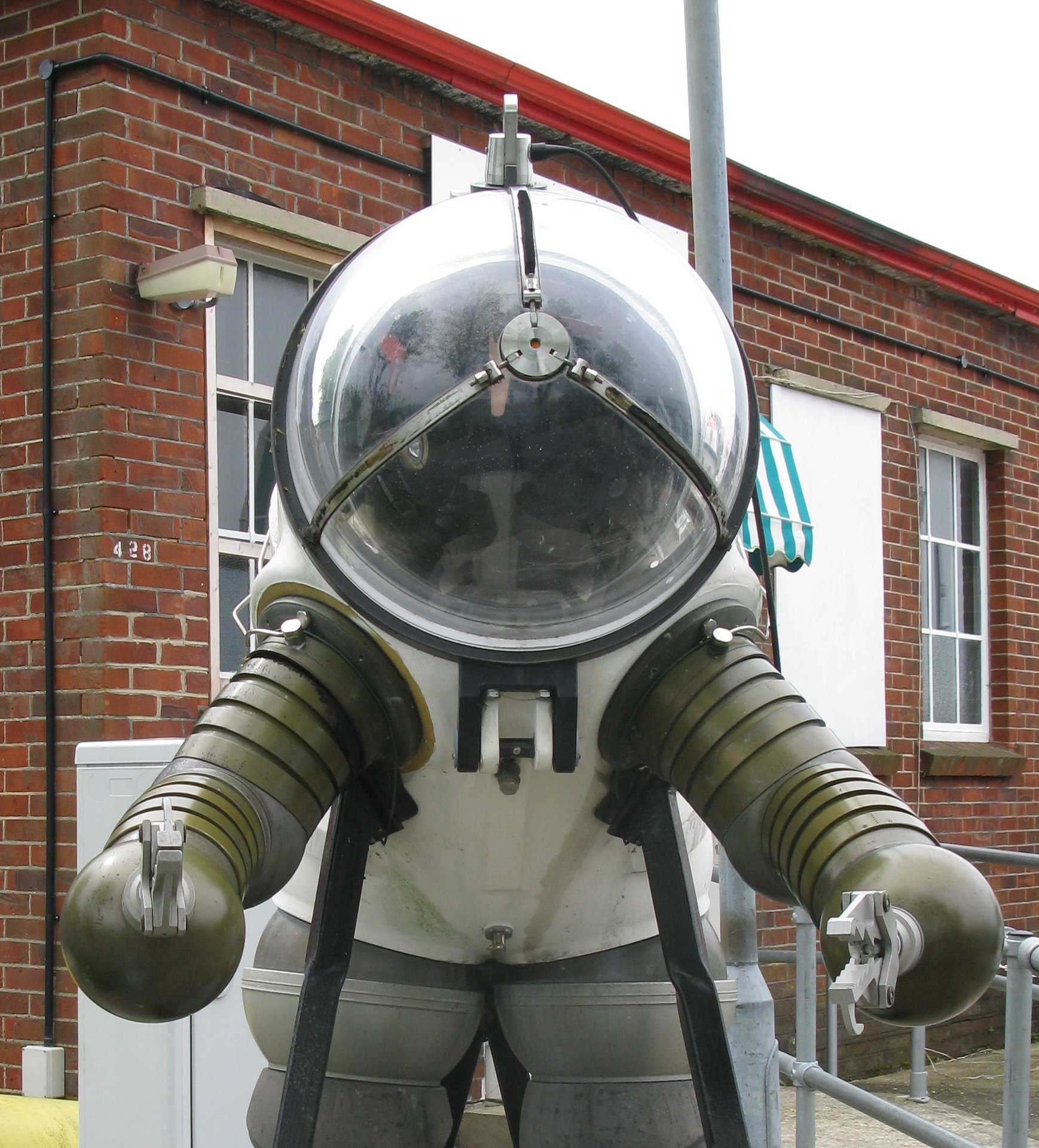
A JIM suit on display at the Royal Navy Submarine Museum, Gosport

Joseph Peress' Tritonia Diving Suit was the starting point for the design of the JIM suit, manufactured from cast magnesium alloy and first successfully tested in September 1930 by Jim Jarrett. Following a dive on the wreck of the RMS Lusitania in 1935, Peress attempted to sell the Tritonia to the Royal Navy and initial sea trials were carried out, but the offer was rejected when it was decided by the Admiralty that Royal Navy divers had no reason to dive to the depths it was capable of. The suit was later retired, and eventually found its way to a junk shop where it would be discovered by Mike Humphrey and Mike Borrow in the mid-1960s. UMEL would later class Peress' suit as the "A.D.S Type I", a designation system that would be continued by the company for later models.

The first UMEL JIM suits, classified as A.D.S II, were constructed from cast magnesium for its high strength-to-weight ratio and weighed approximately 1,100 pounds (500 kg) in air including the diver. They were 6 ft 6 in (1.98 m) in height, 3 ft 5 in (1.04 m) in width, 3 ft 1 in (94 cm) in side width and had a maximum operating depth of 1,500 feet (460 m). Corrosion problems were countered through surface preparation and coating. The suit had a negative buoyancy of 15 to 50 lb (6.8 to 22.7 kg). Ballast was attached to the suit's front and could be jettisoned from within, allowing the operator to ascend to the surface at approximately 100 feet (30 m) per minute. The suit also incorporated a communication link and a jettisonable umbilical connection. The original JIM suit had eight annular oil-supported universal joints, one in each shoulder and lower arm, and one at each hip and knee. The JIM operator received air through an oral/nasal mask that attached to a lung-powered scrubber that had a life-support duration of approximately 72 hours, although actual survival for this time would have been unlikely due to thermal transfer through the magnesium body. As technology improved and operational knowledge grew, Oceaneering upgraded their fleet of JIMs. The magnesium construction was replaced with glass-reinforced plastic (GRP) and the single joints with segmented ones, each allowing seven degrees of motion, and when added together giving the operator a very great range of motion. In addition, the four-port domed top of the suit was replaced by a transparent acrylic one that was taken from Wasp, this allowed the operator a much-improved field of vision. Trials were also carried out by the Ministry of Defence on a flying Jim suit powered from the surface through an umbilical cable. This resulted in a hybrid suit with the ability of working on the sea bed as well as mid water.

In addition to upgrades to the JIM design, other variations of the original suit were constructed. The first, named the SAM Suit (Designated A.D.S III), was a completely aluminium model. A smaller and lighter suit, it was more anthropomorphic than the original JIMs and was depth-rated to 1,000 ft (300 m). Attempts were made to limit corrosion by the use of a chromic anodizing coating applied to the arm and leg joints, which gave them an unusual green color. The SAM suit stood at 6 ft 3 in (1.91 m) in height, and had a life-support duration of 20 hours. Only three SAM suits would be produced by UMEL before the design was shelved. The second, named the JAM suit (Designated A.D.S IV), was constructed of glass-reinforced plastic (GRP) and was depth-rated for around 2,000 ft (610 m). Two were constructed for Oceaneering, as well as an experimental US Navy version, modified with a torso made of carbon fibre reinforced plastic that would prove unsuccessful. The prototype failed at approximately 1,000 ft (300 m) when tested to destruction.

== See also ==
- Atmospheric diving suit
