= Joseph Salim Peress =

Pioneering British diving engineer

- Born: 1896
- Died: June 4, 1978 (aged 81–82)
- Engineering career
- Significant design: Atmospheric diving suit

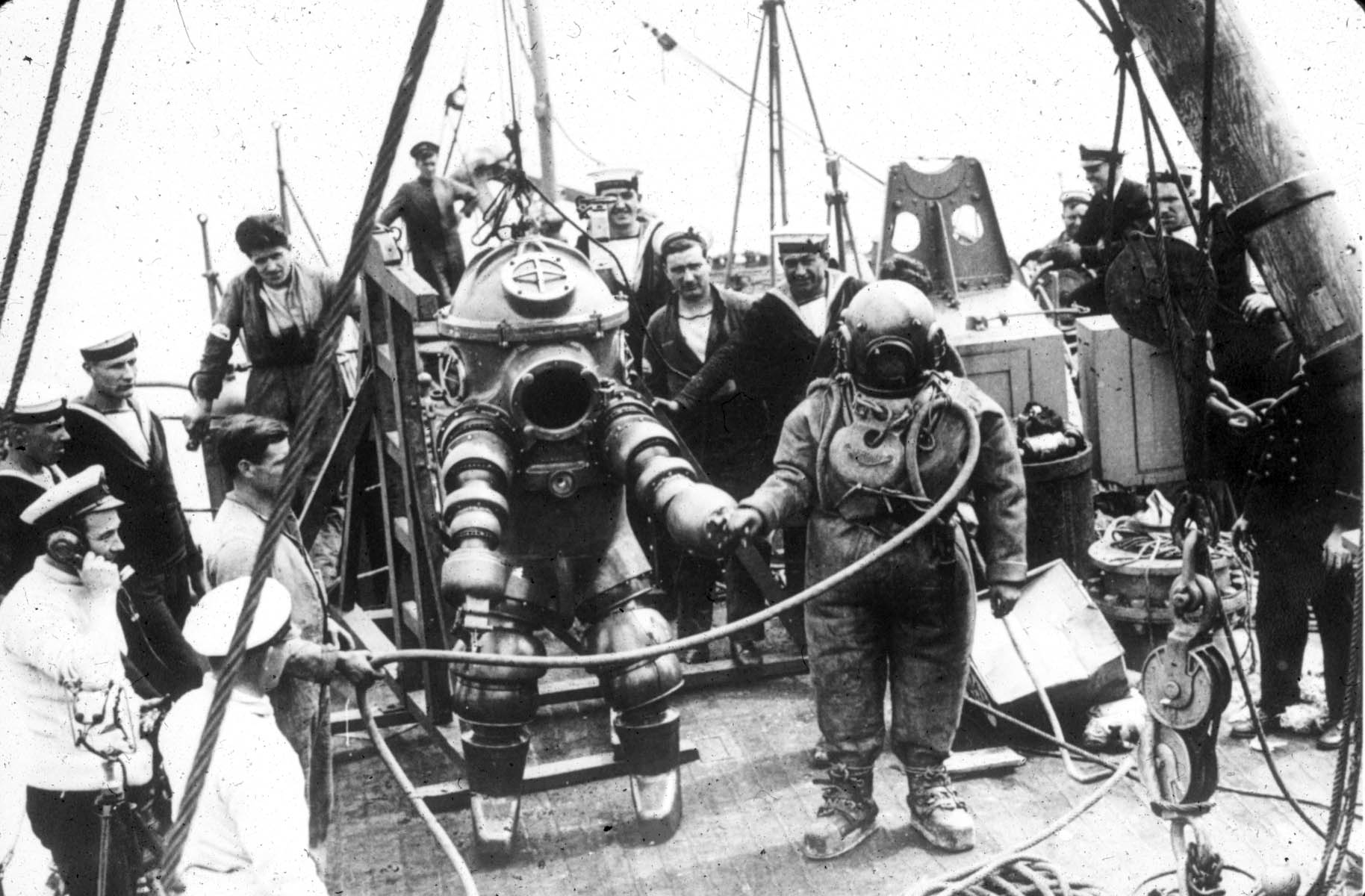
Two divers, one wearing the "Tritonia" ADS and the other standard diving dress, preparing to explore the wreck of the Lusitania, 1935.

Joseph Salim Peress (1896 – June 4, 1978), was a pioneering British diving engineer, inventor of one of the first truly usable atmospheric diving suits, the Tritonia, and was involved in the construction of the JIM suit.

Salim Peress grew up in the Middle East. It is said that his interest in diving suit design started from the observations of Persian Gulf pearl divers.

Peress had a natural talent for engineering design, and had challenged himself to construct an articulated atmospheric diving suit (ADS) that would keep divers dry and at atmospheric pressure, even at great depth. At the time, little was known about decompression diving. Various atmospheric suits had been developed during the Victorian era, but nobody had yet managed to overcome the basic design problem of constructing a joint which would remain both flexible and watertight at depth without seizing up under pressure.

In 1918 Peress began working for WG Tarrant at Byfleet, England, where he was given the space and tools to develop his ideas about constructing an ADS. His first attempt was an immensely complex prototype machined from solid stainless steel.

In 1923 Peress was asked to design a suit for salvage work on the wreck of the P&O liner Egypt which had sunk in 122 m (400 ft) of water off Ushant. He declined, on the grounds that his prototype suit was too heavy for a diver to handle easily, but was encouraged by the request to begin work on a new suit using lighter materials. By 1929 he believed he had solved the weight problem, by using cast magnesium instead of steel, and had also managed to improve the design of the suit's joints by using a trapped cushion of oil to keep the surfaces moving smoothly. The oil, which was virtually non-compressible and readily displaceable, allowed the limb joints to move freely at depths of 600 ft (180 m), where the pressure was 520 psi (35 atm). Peress claimed that the Tritonia suit's joints could function at 1,200 ft (370 m) although this was never proven.

In 1930 Peress revealed the Tritonia suit. By May it had completed trials and was publicly demonstrated in a tank at Byfleet. In September Peress' assistant Jim Jarret dived in the suit to a depth of 123 m (404 ft) - over 67 fathoms - in Loch Ness. The suit performed perfectly, the joints proving resistant to pressure and moving freely even at depth.

The suit was offered to the Royal Navy which turned it down, stating that Navy divers never needed to descend below 90 m (300 ft).

Jim Jarret made a deep dive to 90 m (300 ft), 50 fathoms, on the wreck of the Lusitania off south Ireland, followed by a shallower dive to 60 m (200 ft) in the English Channel in 1937 after which, due to lack of interest, the Tritonia suit was retired. Peress abandoned work on diving suits and instead turned to pioneering work in plastic moulding, later forming a company which became the world's largest manufacturer of gas turbine blades for the aircraft industry.

In 1965, Peress came back from retirement, starting his collaboration with two British engineers, Mike Humphrey and Mike Borrow, interested in designing a modern atmospheric diving suit. The first order of business was finding the original Tritonia suit, which turned up in a Glasgow warehouse. After all those years, the suit was still in working condition, and the octogenarian Peress became the first person to test it in a factory test tank. In 1969 Peress became a consultant to UMEL (Underwater Marine Equipment Limited), the new company formed by Humphrey and Borrow, which eventually created the JIM suit, which was named after Peress' diver Jim Jarret.
