= Karl Heinrich Klingert =

German mechanic and inventor of an early surface-supplied diving suit

Karl Heinrich Klingert (born 16 January 1760 in Herrnprotsch near Breslau, died 1 March 1828 in Breslau) was a German mechanic and inventor, best known for the invention of an early surface-supplied diving suit.

== Biography ==
Klingert's father ran a small brandy distillery northwest of Breslau. Heinrich Klingert attended the Maria-Magdalenen Gymnasium in Breslau (now Wrocław, Poland) for four years, where Johann Friedrich Täsch, who was a teacher at the Magdaleneum at the time, recognized the talents of his student Klingert. A six-year apprenticeship in the mechanical workshop in Täsch, which was attached to the grammar school, was arranged, and which Klingert took over after the death of his teacher. Klingert was particularly interested in chemistry, thermodynamics and fluid mechanics, galvanic energy production, and hydraulics. He was made an honorary member of the "Leipzig Economic Society" in 1798 in recognition of his work on cavitation. His inventions were not commissioned, the practical implementation was costly, and he had no sponsors. Without concern for the cost of living, Klingert may have had even greater success. He had one daughter by his marriage, which was probably before 1785, and died as a royal Prussian government mechanic at the age of 68.

== Achievements ==
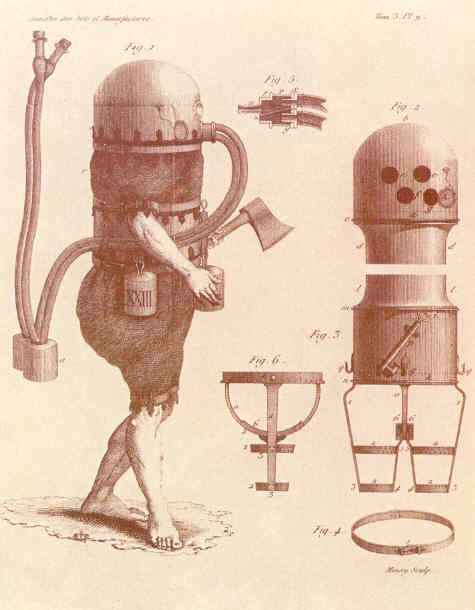
Klingert's diving suit

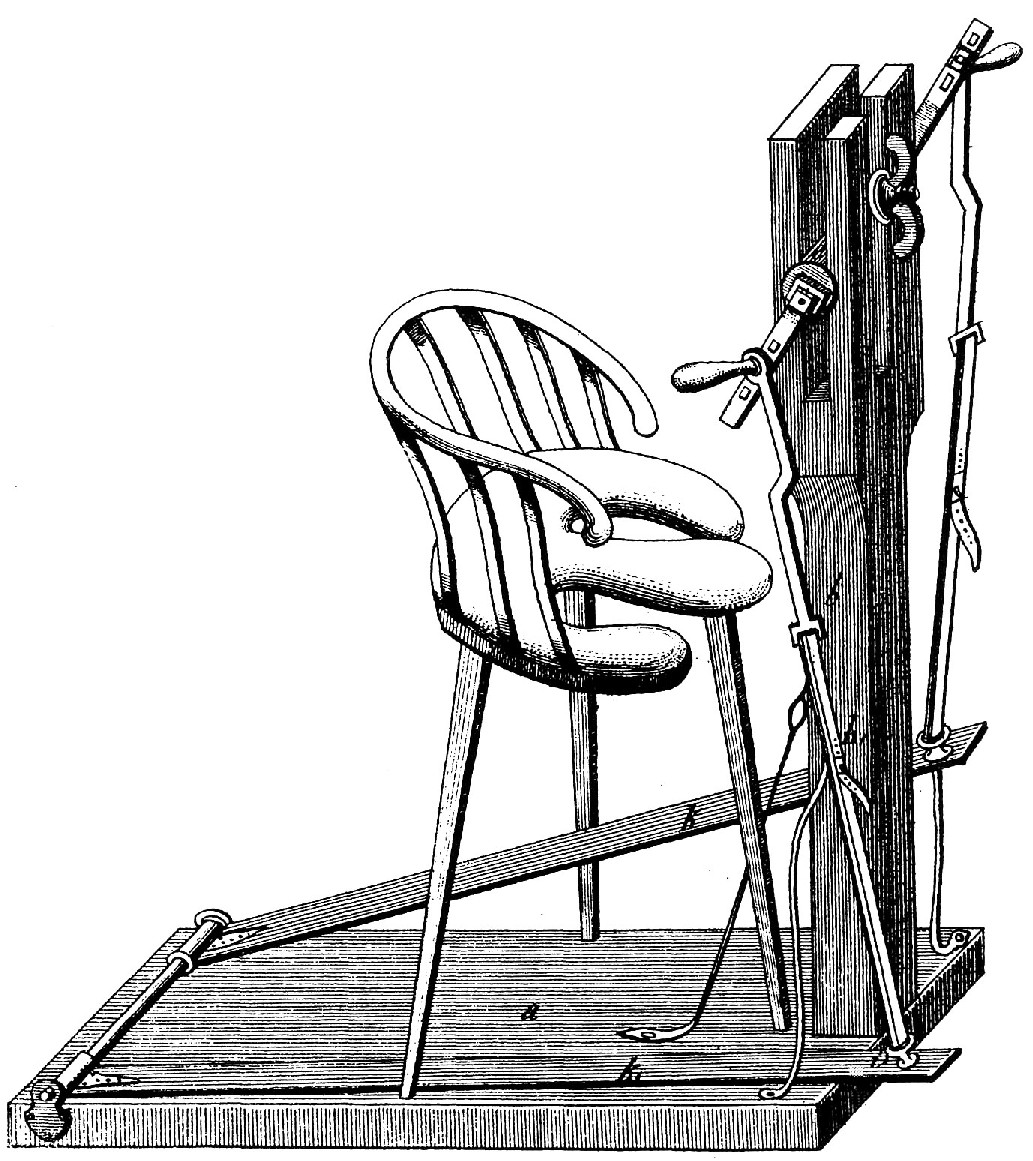
A machine for rehabilitation invented by Klingert in 1810

Klingert built the first electric clock (1815), the first electric motors, a hydraulic ram, and aids for the sick and disabled. He invented a thermometer and a compass for the blind. A diver equipped with diving apparatus developed by Klingert demonstrated its functionality by sawing through a tree trunk in the river Oder. The suit had a rigid helmet with two small viewports and a corselet, connected by a leather jacket which allowed some relative movement between the rigid components. Leather trousers, a weight system, and a jocking harness completed the suit. An air supply was towed behind the diver in a barrel, with two hoses to the helmet. In about 1799 he built an artificial arm for a man who had shot off his right arm while hunting. In 1803 Klingert was made an honorary member of the Faculty of Philosophy at the University of Breslau. In 1803, Christian Heinrich Müller (1772–1849) who had also attended the Maria-Magdalenen Gymnasium, where he met Klingert, founded a society which, from 1809, was called the "Schlesische Gesellschaft für vaterländische Kultur", and Klingert became one of the first members. This society had a good reputation both nationally and internationally, and took the place of an Academy of Sciences and Arts in Silesia. By 1827, Klingert had published about 40 articles in various publications of the society. The "Tauchermaschine" (diving machine) is probably his best-known invention.

== Publications ==
- K.H. Klingert: Beschreibung einer in allen Flüssen brauchbaren Tauchermaschine. [Description of a diving machine suitable for use in rivers], Breslau 1797
- K.H. Klingert: Kurzer Nachtrag zur Geschichte und Beschreibung einer Tauchermaschine nebst der Erklärung einer Laterne oder Lampe, die in jeder verdorbenen Luft und im Wasser brennt. [A Brief Supplement to the History and Description of a Diving Machine : Together with the Explanation of a Lantern Or Lamp which Burns in Any Vitiated Air, and in Water], Breslau 1822
- K.H. Klingert: Anzeige eines neu erfundenen Werkzeuges zum Einstreichen der Zähne in Zahnstangen und Cylinder-Röhren zum Gebrauch für mathematische Instrumente. [Announcement of a newly invented tool for rubbing in the teeth of racks and cylinder-tubes for use in mathematical instruments], Breslau 1826
- In Gilbert's Annalen d. Physik [Annals of physics], Halle, Volume 2, 1799; volume 4, 1800; Volume 5, 1800; Volume 7. 1801; Volume 53, 1816
