= John Lethbridge =

English wool merchant who invented a diving machine in 1715

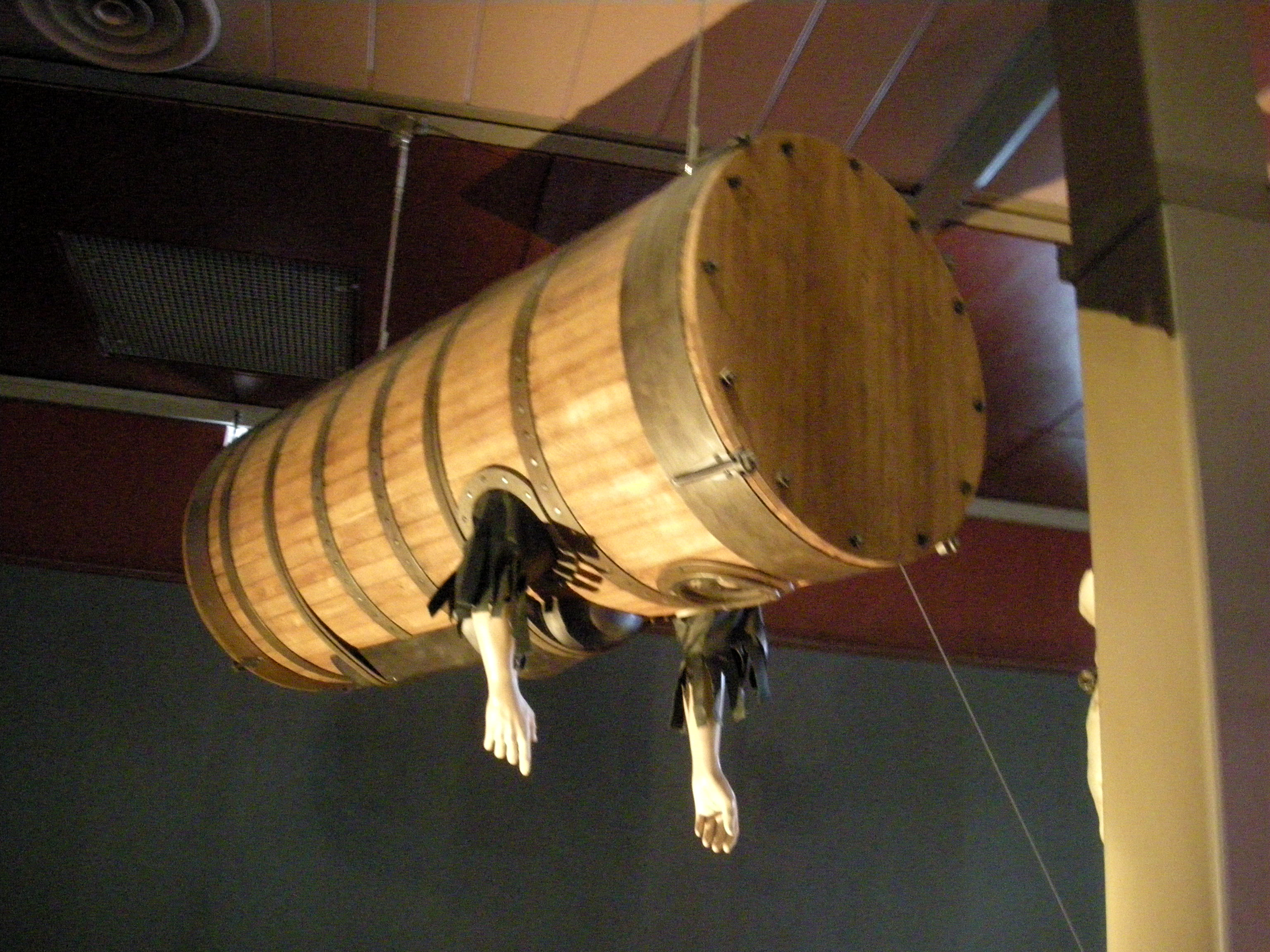
A replica of the Lethbridge diving machine at the Cité de la Mer ('City of the Sea') in Cherbourg, France.

John Lethbridge (1675–1759) was an English merchant and engineer known for inventing the first underwater diving machine in 1715. He lived in the county of Devon in South West England and reportedly had 17 children. He is the subject of the Fisherman's Friends song "John in the Barrel".

== Diving machine ==
This machine was an airtight oak barrel that allowed "the diver" to submerge long enough to retrieve underwater material. In Lethbridge's words:

It is made of wainscot perfectly round, about 6 feet in length, about 2 feet and a half diameter at the head, and about 18 inches diameter at the foot, and contains about 30 gallons; it is hooped with iron hoops without and within to guard against pressure. There are two holes for the arms, and a glass about 4 inches diameter, and an inch and a quarter thick to look through, which is fixed in the bottom part, so as to be in a direct line with the eye, two airholes upon the upper part, into one of which air is conveyed by a pair of bellows, both which are stopt with plugs immediately before going down to the bottom. At the foot part there's a hole to let out water. Sometimes there's a large rope fixed to the back or upper part, by which it's let down, and there's a little line called the signal line, by which the people above are directed what to do, and under is fix'd a piece of timber as a guard for the glass. I go in with my feet foremost, and when my arms are got through the holes, then the head is put on, which is fastened with screws. It requires 500 weight to sink it, and take but 15 pound weight from it and it will buoy upon the surface of the water. I lie straight upon my breast all the time I am in the engine, which hath many times been more than 6 hours, being frequently refreshed upon the surface by a pair of bellows. I can move it about 12 foot square at the bottom, where I have stayed many times 34 minutes. I have been 10 fathoms deep many a hundred times, and have been 12 fathom, but with great difficulty

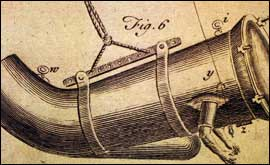
Jacob Rowe's similar diving dress, made of copper, was used by its designer on the salvage of the East Indiaman Vansittart in collaboration with Lethbridge.

After testing this machine in his garden pond (specially built for the purpose) Lethbridge dived on a number of wrecks: four English men-of-war, one East Indiaman (both English and Dutch), two Spanish galleons and a number of galleys. He became very wealthy as a result of his salvage. One of his better-known recoveries was on the Dutch Slot ter Hooge, which had sunk off Madeira with over three tons of silver on board.

Lethbridge is buried in Wolborough church, Newton Abbot.

In 2006, a revamped survey vessel was christened after John Lethbridge.
