= LaRue =

LaRue is a French topographic name for someone who lived beside a road, track, or pathway, Old French rue (Latin ruga ‘crease’, ‘fold’), with the definite article la. It literally means "the street" in French. It is a surname and sometime a given name. Notable people with the name include:

== People ==
=== Surname ===
- Achille Larue (1849–1922), French-Canadian politician
- Allen Larue (born 1981), footballer from Seychelles
- Bartell LaRue (1932–1990), American voice actor
- Brent LaRue (born 1987), American-Slovenian athlete
- Charles W. LaRue (1922–2006), American trombonist and jazz arranger
- Chi Chi LaRue (born 1959), American pornographer
- Christian LaRue, Canadian hockey coach
- Custer LaRue (fl. 1983–present), American soprano
- Danny La Rue (1927–2009), British entertainer born Daniel Patrick Carroll
- Dave LaRue, American bass guitarist
- D.C. LaRue (born 1948), American disco artist
- Dennis LaRue (born 1959), American hockey referee
- Étienne-Benoît Larue (1865–1935), French Catholic missionary
- Eva LaRue (born 1966), American actress
- Florence LaRue (born 1944), American actress
- François-Xavier Larue (1763–1855), French-Canadian farmer and politician
- Frank LaRue (born 1952), UN Special Rapporteur on Freedom of Expression
- Greg laRue (born 1956), pro titler reacher
- Fred LaRue (1928–2004), aide to U.S. President Richard Nixon
- Gerald A. Larue (1916–2014), American scholar of religion, former professor of gerontology, former minister, agnostic, archaeologist and humanist
- Gillie Larew (1882–1977), American mathematician
- Grace La Rue (1882–1956), American actress, singer and vaudeville star
- Henri LaRue (1892–1973), French-Canadian politician
- Jason LaRue (born 1974), American former Major League Baseball player
- Jim LaRue (1925–2015), American football player and coach
- Lash LaRue (1917–1996), American actor and star of westerns
- Leonard LaRue (1914–2001), American freighter captain who rescued over 14,000 Korean War refugees, in the largest rescue operation by a single ship in history
- Mitcy Larue, politician in Seychelles, first elected in 1993
- Natalie LaRue (born 1983), American musician
- Perrault LaRue (1925–1987), French-Canadian politician
- Phillip LaRue, American musician
- Praxède Larue (1823–1902), French-Canadian physician and politician
- Rusty LaRue (born 1973), American basketball coach and former National Basketball Association player
- Stoney LaRue (born 1977), American country music singer-songwriter born Stoney Larue Phillips
- Travis LaRue (1913–2009), former mayor of Austin, Texas
- Vildebon-Winceslas Larue (1851–1906), French-Canadian politician
- Will Larue, Canadian racing driver
- LaRue family, a family of American pioneers

=== Given name ===
- LaRue Kirby (1889–1961), American Major League Baseball outfielder
- LaRue Martin (born 1950), American former National Basketball Association player
- LaRue Parker (1935–2011), former Chairperson of the Caddo Nation of Oklahoma
- La Rue Washington (born 1953), briefly a Major League Baseball player

== Fictional characters ==
- Clarisse LaRue, a character in Rick Riordan's Percy Jackson and the Olympians series
- J.D. LaRue, on the television series Hill Street Blues, played by Kiel Martin
- Larue Wilson, in the novel Gidget and on the television series Gidget
- Dr. Mary Lou LaRue, a Whoville scientist in the film Horton Hears a Who (based on the book by Dr. Seuss), voiced by Isla Fisher
- Adeline "Addie" LaRue, the main character of the novel The Invisible Life of Addie LaRue by V. E. Schwab.

== See also ==
- Leroux (surname)
