= De Roux =

De Roux or deRoux is a French surname (which in English translates to “of red”), and may refer to:

- Claude de Roux de Saint-Laurent (died 1689), French soldier, governor of Saint Christophe
- Dominique de Roux (1935–1977), French writer and publisher
- François de Roux (1897–1954), French writer
- R. James deRoux (1930-2012), Jamaican businessman and philanthropist
- Marie Manning (murderer) (née de Roux) (1821–1849), Swiss domestic servant and murderess
- Monique de Roux (born 1946), French painter and engraver
- Paul Le Roux (born 1972), Rhodesian programmer, criminal cartel boss and informant
- Pierre-Guillaume de Roux (1963–2021), French editor
- Stefanie de Roux, Panamanian model and beauty pageant contestant
- Stephen DeRoux (born 1983), Jamaican footballer
- Xavier de Roux (1940–2015), French politician

== See also ==
- Roux (surname)
- Rio (disambiguation)
- Ríos (disambiguation)
- Leroux (surname)
