= Exposure suit =

Clothing to protect against an extreme environment

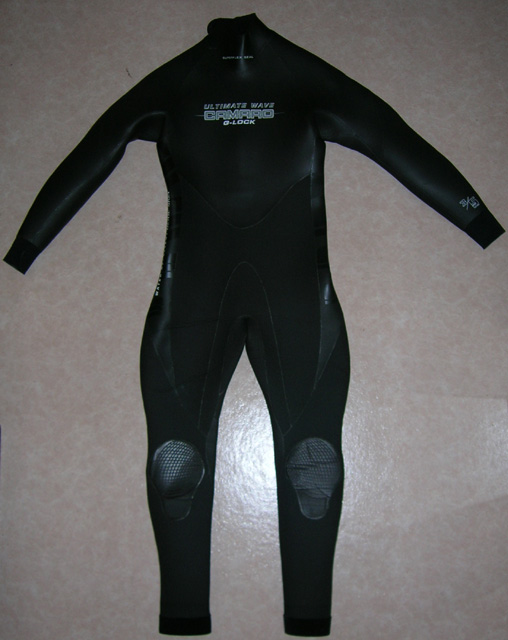
Wetsuit

An exposure suit, or anti-exposure suit, is clothing intended to protect the wearer from an extreme environment. Depending on the environment and specific use, the suit may be required to provide thermal insulation, buoyancy, and/or complete isolation from the environment. The exposure suit may be a stand-alone unit, or may require undergarments to function correctly. The choice of undergarments may depend on the specific environment. Often, the term refers to protection from cold and wet environments at sea. Depending on the type of suit, they may be worn during normal work, in emergencies, or when exposed to unusual conditions.

Classes of exposure suits include diving suits, space suits, offshore survival suits, immersion suits, and foul weather gear. Snowsuits, firefighting apparel, hazmat suits and other body-covering personal protective equipment may also be considered forms of exposure suits.

== History ==
Exposure suits have been used to protect people from physical, environmental, health, and other hazards throughout history. In the 18th century, metal diving suits were created for underwater exploration. However, the stiff suits and limited oxygen supply made movement and exploration difficult. Toward the 19th century, the Siebe-Gorman diving dress was invented, consisting of a metal helmet, leather suit, and lead boots. The suit allowed for a wider range of motion while protecting divers from hazardous conditions. Atmospheric diving suits were created in the early 1900s, which allowed divers to explore deeper ocean depths. The suits were constructed with materials that maintained atmospheric pressure while resisting underwater pressure, keeping divers safe. Further advancements, such as SCUBA gear and neoprene wetsuits, were developed in the 1940s and 1950s. This gear also led to the creation of dry suits in the 1970s and 1980s, which protect the user from water and thermal hazards.

One of the earliest space suits became apparent during the Space Race of the 1950s and 1960s. Yuri Gagarin, a Soviet air force pilot, was the first human to enter space. Gagarin's space suit consisted of an orange full-body suit, a helmet, and thermal clothes. Alan Shepard later became the first American to enter space. Shepard's space suit contained a full-body pressurized suit, helmet, and boots. Further advancements led to the creation of the launch and entry suit, extravehicular activity (EVA) suit, and other space suits.

Hazmat suits have existed since the Bubonic Plague, with one of the earliest examples being the plague doctor uniform. The uniform was designed to protect the user against contamination from those infected with the plague. During the Industrial Revolution, hazmat suits underwent major changes due to the dangerous environments workers encountered. Rubber suits were created during this time to protect workers handling hazardous materials. In 1910 and 1911, protective suits were used during the Manchurian plague. This plague marked the beginning of the modern hazmat suit. Hazmat suits were also used during World War I with the rise of chemical warfare, and in the nuclear age to protect workers against radiation. Modern hazmat suits are used in a variety of industries, such as firefighting, healthcare, hazardous materials response, and other sectors.

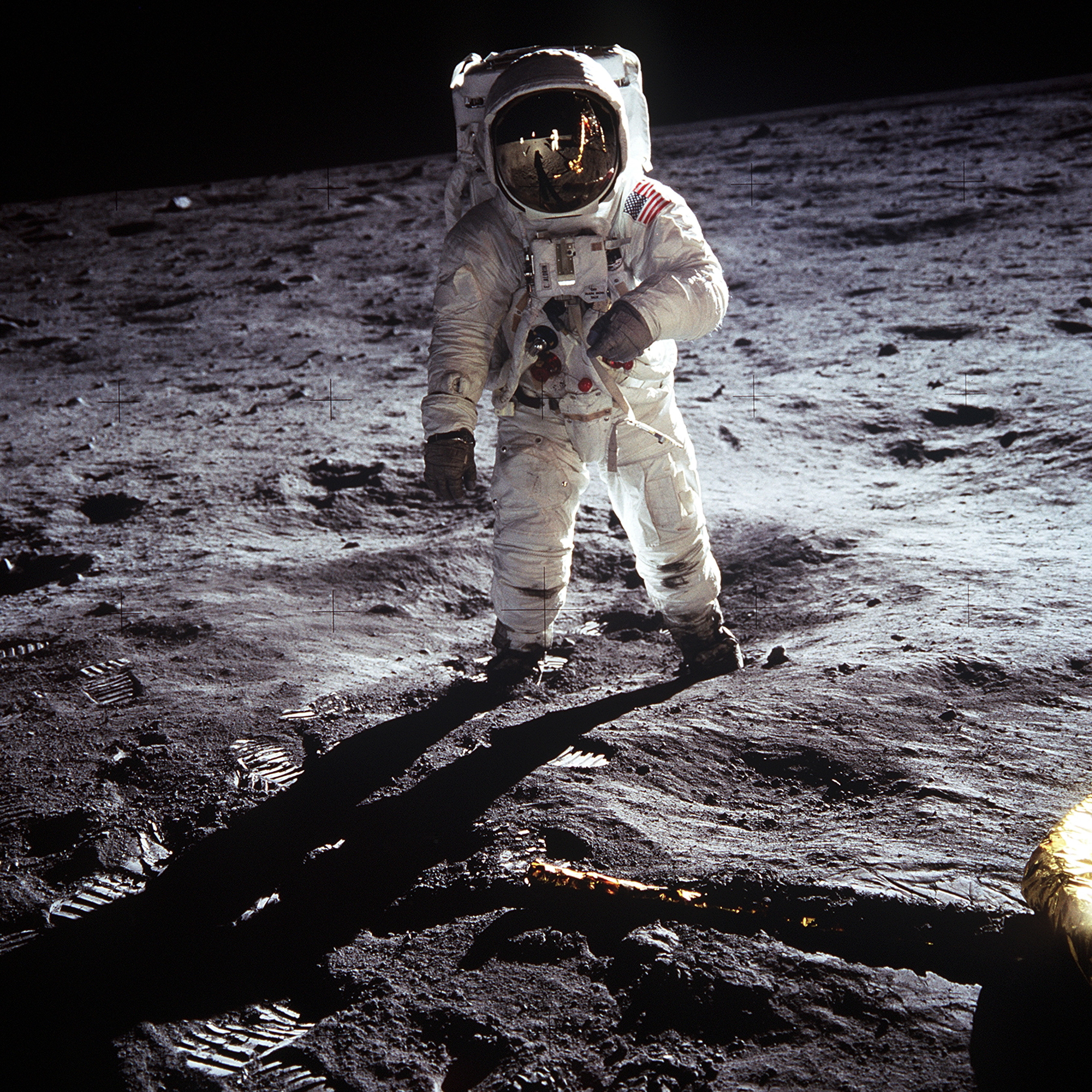
Extravehicular Activity (EVA) space suit

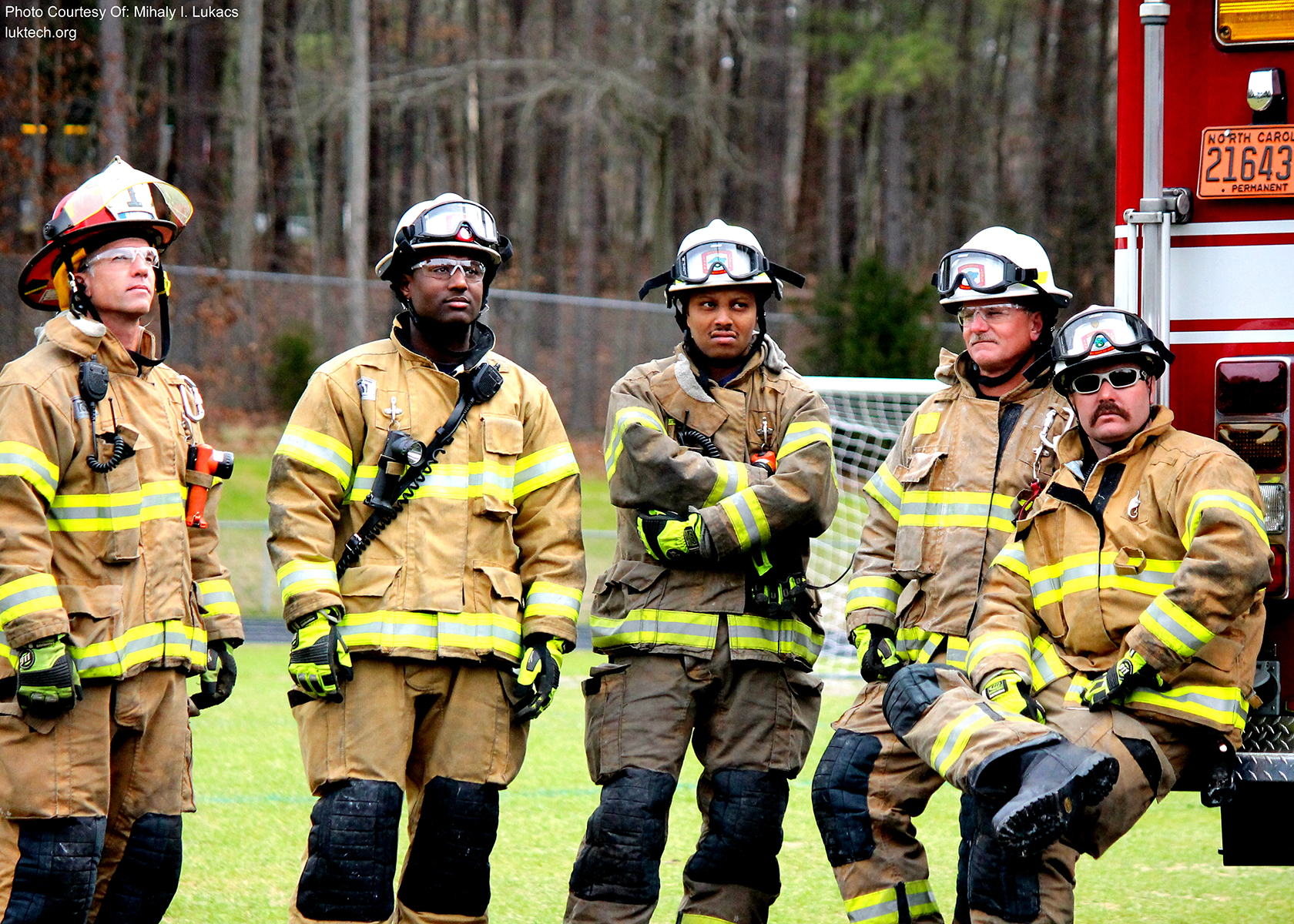
Firefighters in full turnout gear

== Types ==
- Diving suits
  - Standard diving dress – Copper helmet with rubberised canvas diving suit and weighted boots
  - Diving skin – Thin exposure suit to protect the skin in warm water
  - Wetsuit – Garment worn to provide thermal protection while wet
  - Dry suit – Watertight clothing that seals the wearer from cold and hazardous liquids
  - Hot water suit – A wetsuit with a supply of heated water to keep a diver warm
- Space suits
  - Launch and entry suit – Provides protection for the wearer during launch and entry operations
  - Extravehicular Activity (EVA) suit – A spacesuit that allows for safe travel and activity outside of space apparatus.
- Survival suits
  - SOLAS offshore anti-exposure suit.
  - Immersion suit – Waterproof suit that protects the wearer from hypothermia from immersion in cold water
- Foul weather gear
  - Oilskins – Waterproof garment made from treated sailcloth or canvas
  - Dry suit – Watertight clothing that seals the wearer from cold and hazardous liquids
- Snow suits
  - Ski suit – Clothing that provides thermal protection for the user while skiing or snowboarding.
  - Snowmobile suit – Designed to protect the user against freezing temperatures and drowning
- Firefighting apparel
  - Turnout gear – Provides thermal protection and full-body insulation from job-related threats firefighters may encounter
  - Proximity suit – A firefighting suit that protects the wearer against extreme radiant heat

== Inspections and maintenance ==
Inspections and maintenance largely depend on the type of exposure suit used. Common maintenance practices include visually inspecting the suit for signs of disrepair. Exposure suits should also be stored in a dry environment with easy access.
