= Diving suit =

Garment or device designed to protect a diver from the underwater environment

Diving suits
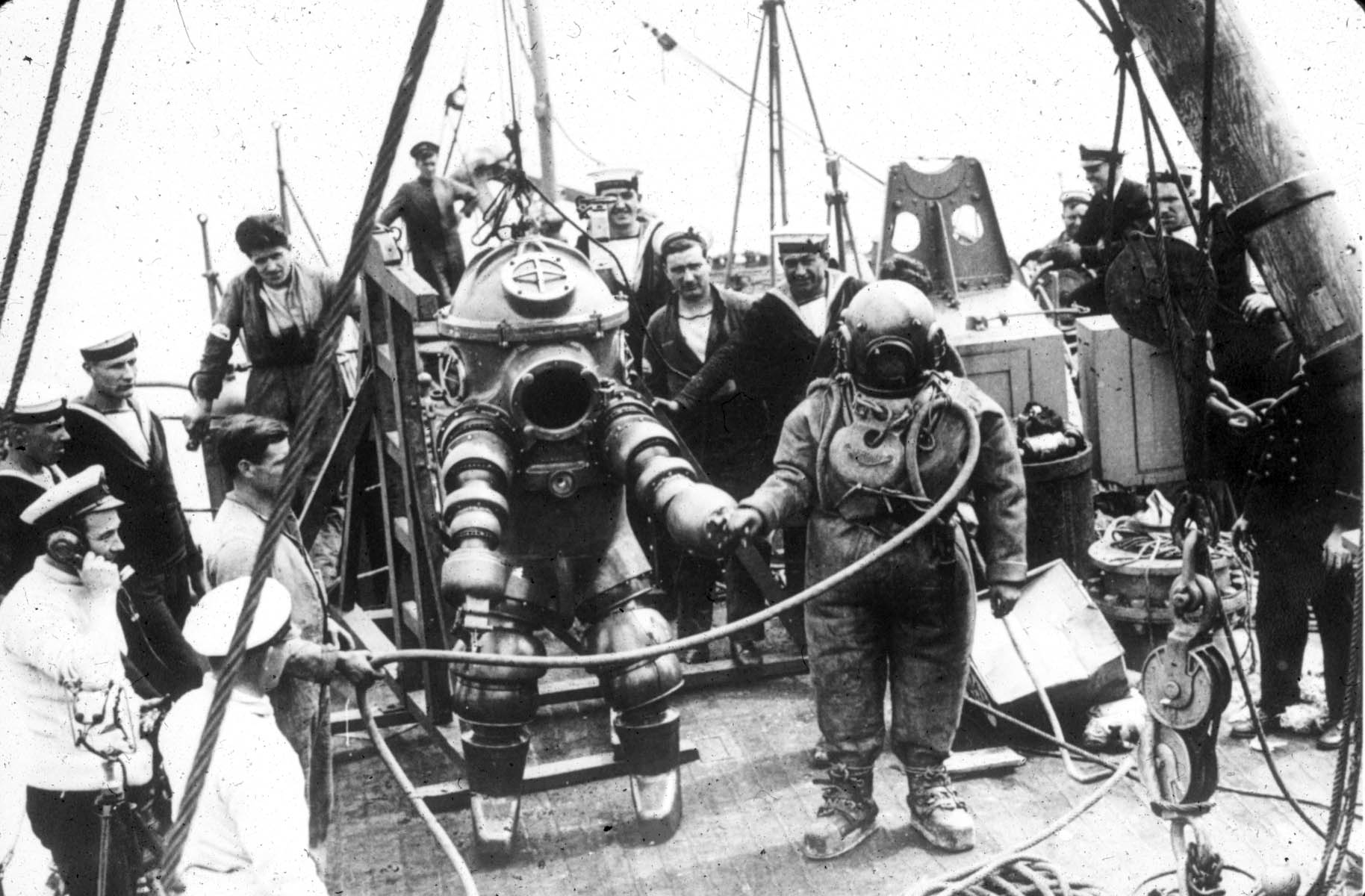
- Two divers, one wearing a 1 atmosphere diving suit and the other standard diving dress, preparing to explore the wreck of the RMS Lusitania, 1935
- Uses: Protection of the diver from the environment
- Related items: Atmospheric diving suit, dry suit, hot water suit, rash guard, wetsuit

A diving suit is a garment or device designed to protect a diver from the underwater environment. A diving suit may also incorporate a breathing gas supply (such as for a standard diving dress or atmospheric diving suit), but in most cases the term applies only to the environmental protective covering worn by the diver. The breathing gas supply is usually referred to separately. There is no generic term for the combination of suit and breathing apparatus alone. It is generally referred to as diving equipment or dive gear along with any other equipment necessary for the dive.

Diving suits can be divided into two classes: "soft" or ambient pressure diving suits – examples are wetsuits, dry suits, semi-dry suits and dive skins – and "hard" or atmospheric pressure diving suits, armored suits that keep the diver at atmospheric pressure at any depth within the operating range of the suit. Hot water suits are actively heated wetsuits.

== Function ==
The diving suit is worn as a form of protection from the diving environment. This has several aspects, the importance of which may vary depending on the specific environment of the dive. Atmospheric diving suits primarily isolate the diver from the ambient pressure, and all the complications it brings as consequences of breathing gas under pressure. Ambient pressure suits – dive skins, wetsuits and dry suits – have no pressure isolation effect, and are usually primarily worn for thermal protection, and thermal protection can also influence decompression. A common secondary purpose of dive skins, wetsuits and dry suits is protection from abrasion, stings from sea animals and minor cuts and impact injury. In some environments containing hazardous materials or microorganisms, the dry suit has the primary function of isolating the diver from the hazardous materials or microorganisms. This type of suit relies on full watertight coverage for effective protection. These additional functions are inherently available from the atmospheric diving suit.

== History ==
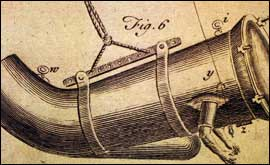
John Lethbridge's diving dress, the first enclosed diving suit, built in the 1710s.

Charles C.-J. Le Roux created a waterproof and windproof fabric which could be made into early diving suits. The first diving suit designs appeared in the early 18th century. Two English inventors developed the first pressure-resisting diving suits in the 1710s. John Lethbridge built a completely enclosed suit to aid in salvage work. It consisted of a pressure-proof air-filled barrel with a glass viewing hole and two watertight enclosed sleeves. This suit gave the diver enough maneuverability to accomplish useful underwater salvage work.

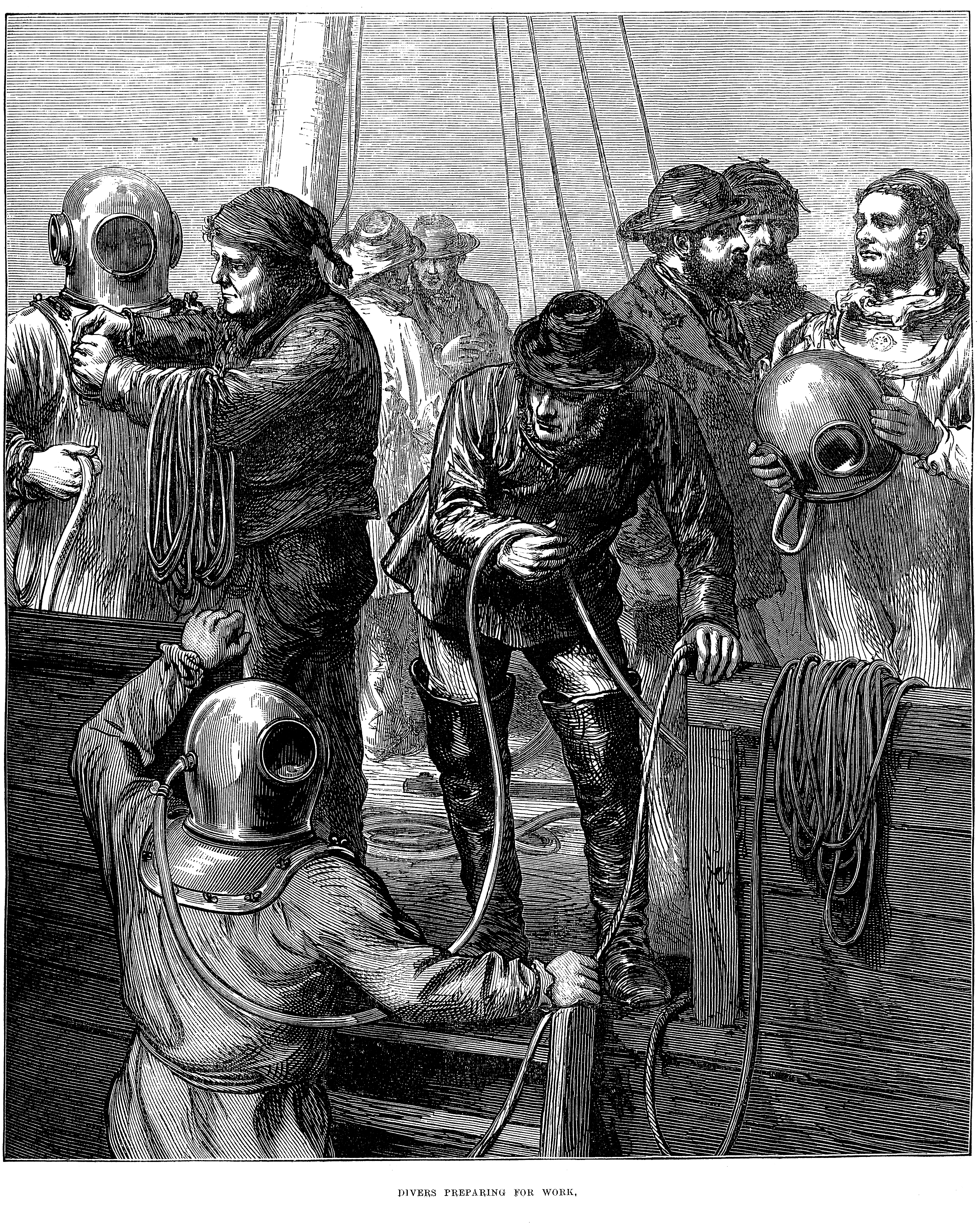
Siebe's improved design in 1873.

After testing this machine in his garden pond (specially built for the purpose) Lethbridge dived on a number of wrecks: four English men-of-war, one East Indiaman, two Spanish galleons and a number of galleys. He became very wealthy as a result of his salvages. One of his better-known recoveries was on the Dutch Slot ter Hooge, which had sunk off Madeira with over three tons of silver on board.

At the same time, Andrew Becker created a leather-covered diving suit with a helmet featuring a window. Becker used a system of tubes for inhaling and exhaling, and demonstrated his suit in the River Thames, London, during which he remained submerged for an hour.

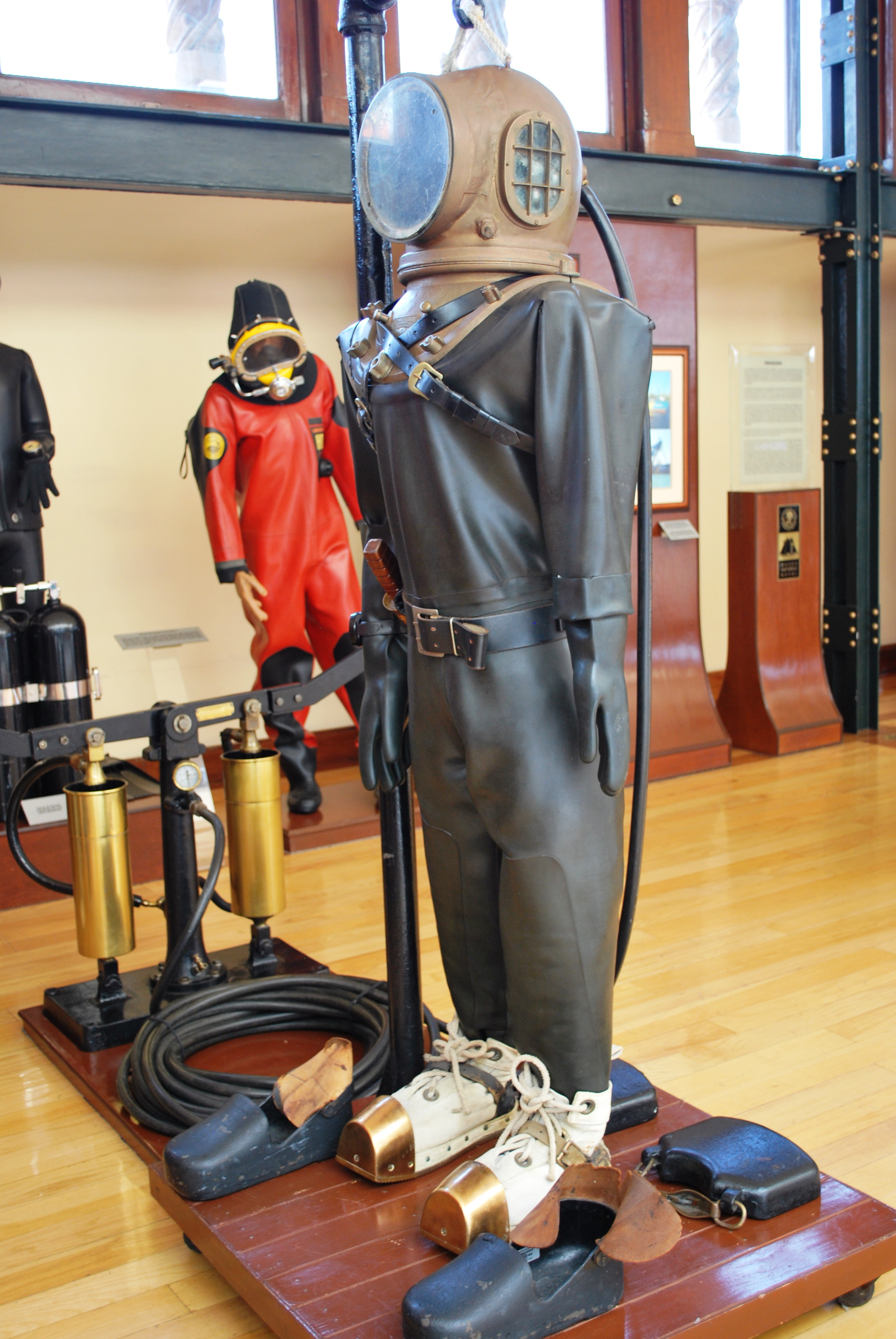
Early diving suit on display at the Naval History Museum in Mexico City.

German-born British engineer Augustus Siebe developed the standard diving dress in the 1830s. Expanding on improvements on the Deane brothers' helmet already made by another engineer, George Edwards, Siebe produced his own design: a helmet fitted to a full length watertight canvas diving suit. Later suits were made from waterproofed canvas invented by Charles Macintosh. From the late 1800s and throughout most of the 20th century, most standard dress was made from a thin sheet of solid rubber laminated between layers of tan twill.

The oldest preserved suit, named "Wanha herra" (meaning "Old gentleman" in the old Finnish language) can be found in Raahe Museum, Finland. It was made of calf leather, and dates from the 18th century. Its exact origin is unknown but the foot parts suggest a Finnish origin. The suit, which was used in short underwater work like checking the condition of the bottom of a ship, was donated to Raahe Museum by Captain Johan Leufstadius (1829–1906), who was a master mariner, merchant and ship owner. The conservator of Raahe Museum, Jouko Turunen, tailored an accurate copy of the old suit in 1988, which has been successfully tested underwater several times.

The Sladen suit was a type of heavy dry suit made by Siebe Gorman which was used with rebreathers by British navy divers during the Second World War. Lighter dry suits made of latex rubber by Pirelli were used in World War II by Italian frogmen. They were patented in 1951.

== Ambient pressure suits ==
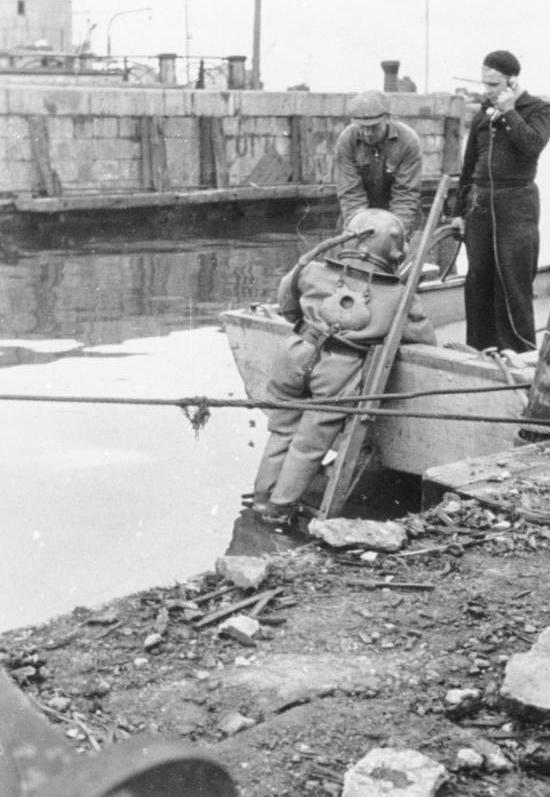
Diver of the Estonian Home Guard, 1941

Ambient pressure suits are a form of exposure protection protecting the wearer from the cold and in the case of dry suits, from contact with the surrounding water. They also provide some defense from abrasive and sharp objects as well as some forms of potentially harmful underwater life. They do not protect divers from the pressure of the surrounding water or barotrauma and decompression sickness.

There are five main types of ambient pressure diving suits; dive skins, wetsuits and their derivative semi-dry suit and hot-water suits, and dry suits. Apart from hot water suits, these types of suit are not exclusively used by divers but are often used for thermal protection by people engaged in other water sports activities such as surfing, sailing, powerboating, windsurfing, kite surfing, waterskiing, caving and swimming.

Added buoyancy due to the volume of the suit is a side effect of most diving suits. A diving weighting system can be worn to counteract this buoyancy. Overalls may be worn over the diving suit as additional protection against cuts and abrasion. This is more usual for professional divers. Overalls increase drag while swimming and are not popular for recreational scuba.

=== Dive skins ===
Dive skins are used when diving in water temperatures above 25 °C (77 °F). They are made from spandex or Lycra and provide little thermal protection, but do protect the skin from jellyfish stings, abrasion and sunburn. This kind of suit is also known as a 'Stinger Suit'. Some divers wear a dive skin under a wetsuit, which allows easier donning and (for those who experience skin problems from neoprene) provides additional comfort.

The "Dive Skin" was originally invented to protect scuba divers in Queensland Australia against the "Box jellyfish" (Chironex fleckeri)

In 1978, Tony Farmer was a swimsuit designer and manufacturer who owned a business called "Daring Designs". Besides swimwear he also did underwear and aerobic wear which included a full suit in Lycra/Spandex. He became a scuba diver and that was the catalyst to the invention of the "dive skin" as we know it today.

=== Wetsuits ===
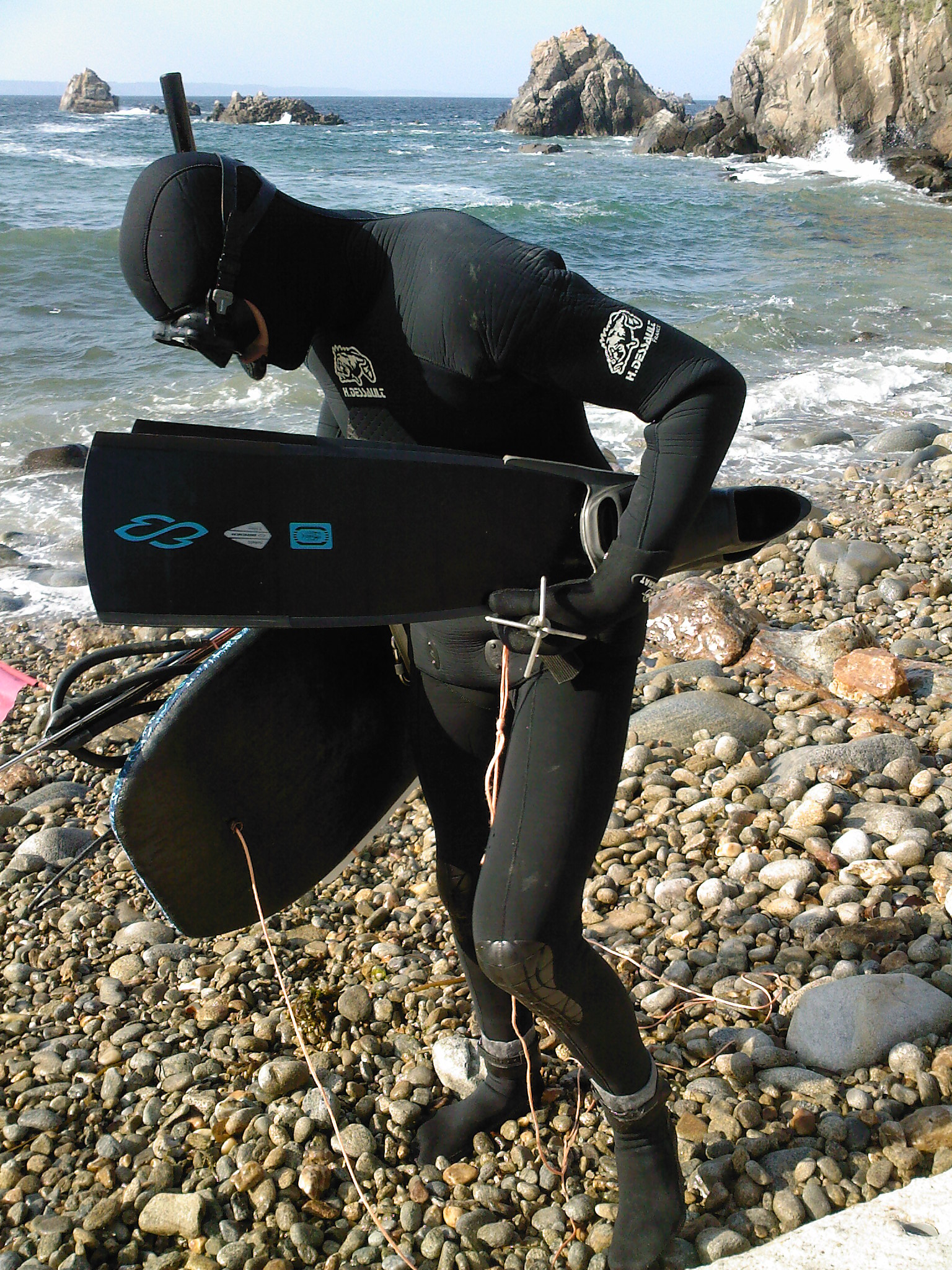
Spearfisher in wet suit

Wetsuits are relatively inexpensive, simple, expanded neoprene suits that are typically used where the water temperature is between 10 and 25 °C (50 and 77 °F). The foamed neoprene of the suit thermally insulates the wearer. Although water can enter the suit, a close fitting suit prevents excessive heat loss because little of the water warmed inside the suit escapes from the suit to be replaced by cold water, a process referred to as "flushing".

Proper fit is critical for warmth. A suit that is too loose will allow a large amount of water to circulate over the diver's skin, taking up body heat. A suit that is too tight is very uncomfortable and can impair circulation at the neck, a very dangerous condition which can cause blackouts. For this reason, many divers choose to have wetsuits custom-tailored instead of buying them "off the rack". Many companies offer this service and the cost is often comparable to an off-the-rack suit.

Wetsuits are limited in their ability to preserve warmth by three factors: the wearer is still exposed to some water, the suit is compressed by the ambient pressure, reducing effectiveness at depth, and the insulating neoprene can only be made to a certain thickness before it becomes impractical to don and wear. The thickest commercially available wetsuits are usually 10 mm thick. Other common thicknesses are 7 mm, 5 mm, 3 mm, and 1 mm. A 1 mm suit provides very little warmth and is usually considered a dive skin, rather than a wetsuit. Wetsuits can be made using more than one thickness of neoprene, to put the most thickness where it will be most effective in keeping the diver warm. A similar effect can be achieved by layering wetsuits of different coverage. Some makes of neoprene are softer, lighter and more compressible than others for the same thickness, and are more suitable for wetsuits for non-diving purposes as they will compress and lose their insulating value more quickly under pressure, though they are more comfortable for surface sports because they are more flexible and allow more freedom of movement.

==== Semi-dry suits ====
Semi-dry suits are effectively a wetsuit with watertight seams and nearly watertight seals at wrist, neck, ankles and zip. They are typically used where the water temperature is between 10 and 20 °C (50 and 68 °F). The seals limit the volume of water entering and leaving the suit, and a close fit minimises pumping action caused by limb motion. The wearer gets wet in a semi-dry suit but the water that enters is soon warmed up and does not readily leave the suit, so the wearer remains warm. The trapped layer of water does not add to the suit's insulating ability, and any water circulation past the seals still causes heat loss, but semi-dry suits are cheap and simple compared to dry suits, and do not fail catastrophically. They are usually made from thick Neoprene, which provides good thermal protection, but lose buoyancy and thermal protection as the trapped gas bubbles in the neoprene foam compress at depth. Semi-dry suits are usually made as a one piece full suit with neoprene wrist, cuff and neck seals having a slick sealing surface in contact with the skin. Two-piece sets tend to be a one piece full length suit, sometimes described as "long johns", plus accessories to be worn over, under or with the one-piece suit, such as a shortie tunic, which may be worn separately in warm water, but has no flush-limiting seals at the openings. Semi dry suits do not usually include hoods, boots or gloves, so separate insulating hoods, boots and gloves are worn.

==== Hot water suits ====
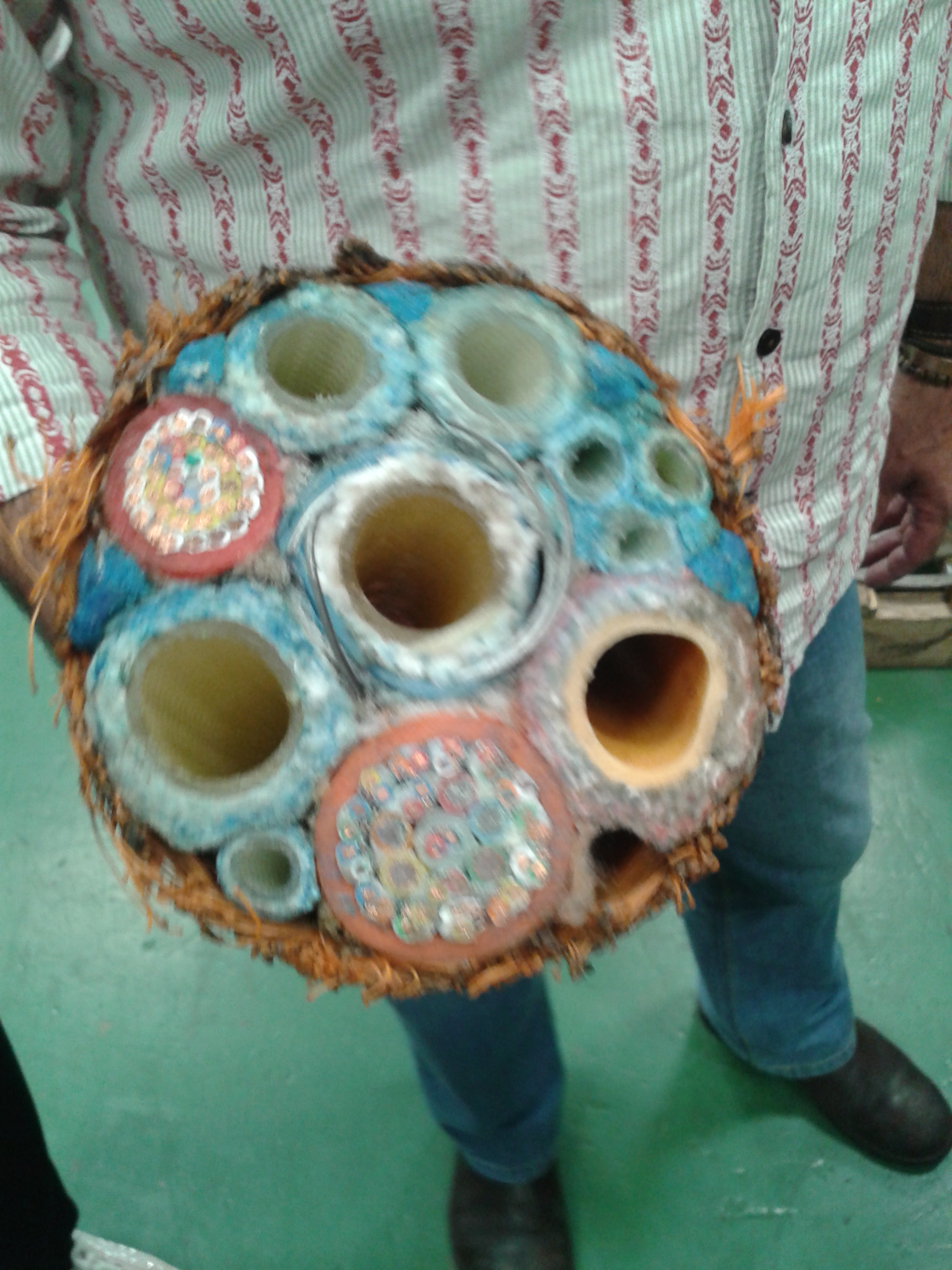
Bell umbilical section, containing among other components, hot water supply hoses.

Hot water suits are loose fitting neoprene wetsuits used in cold water commercial surface-supplied diving. A hose in the diver's umbilical line, which links the diver to the surface support, carries the hot water from a heater at the surface down to the suit. The diver controls the flow rate of the water from a valve near their waist, allowing them to vary the warmth of the suit in response to changes in environmental conditions and workload. Tubes inside the suit distribute the water to the limbs, chest, and back. Special boots, gloves, and hood are worn to extend heating to the extremities. Breathing gas heating at the helmet is available by using a hot water shroud over the helmet inlet piping between the valve block and the regulator. These suits are normally made of foamed neoprene and are similar to wetsuits in construction and appearance, but they do not fit as closely by design, and need not be very thick, as their primary function is to temporarily retain and guide the flow of the heating water. The wrists and ankles of the suit are open, allowing water to flush out of the suit as it is replenished with fresh hot water from the surface.

Hot water suits are often used for deep dives when breathing mixes containing helium are used. Helium conducts heat much more efficiently than air, but has a lower molar heat capacity. The heat capacity by volume is increased proportionally to the pressure which means that the diver will lose large quantities of body heat through the lungs when breathing it at great depths. This compounds the risk of hypothermia already present in the cold temperatures found at these depths. Under these conditions a hot water suit is a matter of survival, not comfort. Loss of heated water supply for hot water suits can be a life-threatening emergency with a high risk of debilitating hypothermia. Just as an emergency backup source of breathing gas is required, a backup water heater is also an essential precaution whenever dive conditions warrant a hot water suit. If the heater fails and a backup unit cannot be immediately brought online, a diver in the coldest conditions can die within minutes. Depending on decompression obligations, bringing the diver directly to the surface could prove equally deadly.

Heated water in the suit forms an active insulation barrier to heat loss, but the temperature must be regulated within fairly close limits. If the temperature falls below about 32 °C, hypothermia can result, and temperatures above 45 °C can cause burn injury to the diver. The diver may not notice a gradual change in inlet temperature, and in the early stages of hypo- or hyperthermia, may not notice the deteriorating condition. The suit is loose fitting to allow unimpeded water flow. This causes a large transient volume of water (13 to 22 litres) to be held in the suit, which can impede swimming due to the added inertia. When controlled correctly, the hot water suit is safe, comfortable and effective, and allows the diver adequate control of thermal protection, however hot water supply failure can be life-threatening.

The diver will usually wear something under a hot water suit for protection against scalding and chafe, and for personal hygiene, as hot water suits may be shared by divers on different shifts, and the interior of the suit may transmit fungal infections if not sufficiently cleaned between users. Wetsuits are effective against scalding of the covered parts of the body, and thermal underwear can protect against chafe, and keep the standby diver warm at the surface.

Hot water is supplied from a heating system at the surface, commonly heated by burning diesel fuel, though electrical versions are also available, and the water is delivered to the umbilical by a pump. Heaters may be rated from one to three divers. Large hot water systems are available in containerised packages.

The hot water supply hose of the umbilical is commonly 1/2 inch (13 mm) bore, and is connected to a supply manifold at the right hip of the suit, which has a set of valves to allow the diver to control flow to the front and back of the torso, and to the arms and legs, and to dump the supply to the environment if the water is too hot or too cold. The manifold distributes the water through the suit through perforated tubes. The hot-water suit is normally a one-piece neoprene wetsuit, fairly loose fitting, to fit over a thin neoprene undersuit, which can protect the diver from scalding if the temperature control system fails, with a zipper on the front of the torso and on the lower part of each leg. Gloves and boots are worn which receive hot water from the ends of the arm and leg hoses. If a full-face mask is worn, the hood may be supplied by a tube at the neck of the suit. Helmets do not require heating. The heating water flows out at the neck and cuffs of the suit through the overlap with gloves, boots, or hood.

==== Risks associated with hot water suits ====
- Increased risk of decompression sickness due to accelerated ingassing during the deep part of the dive, exacerbated if the heating is reduced during decompression.
- Increased risk of hypothermia if the skin is warm enough not to feel chilled, but heat balance is negative, as peripheral vasoconstriction to conserve heat does not occur. Major heat loss to breathing gas can occur.

=== Dry suits ===
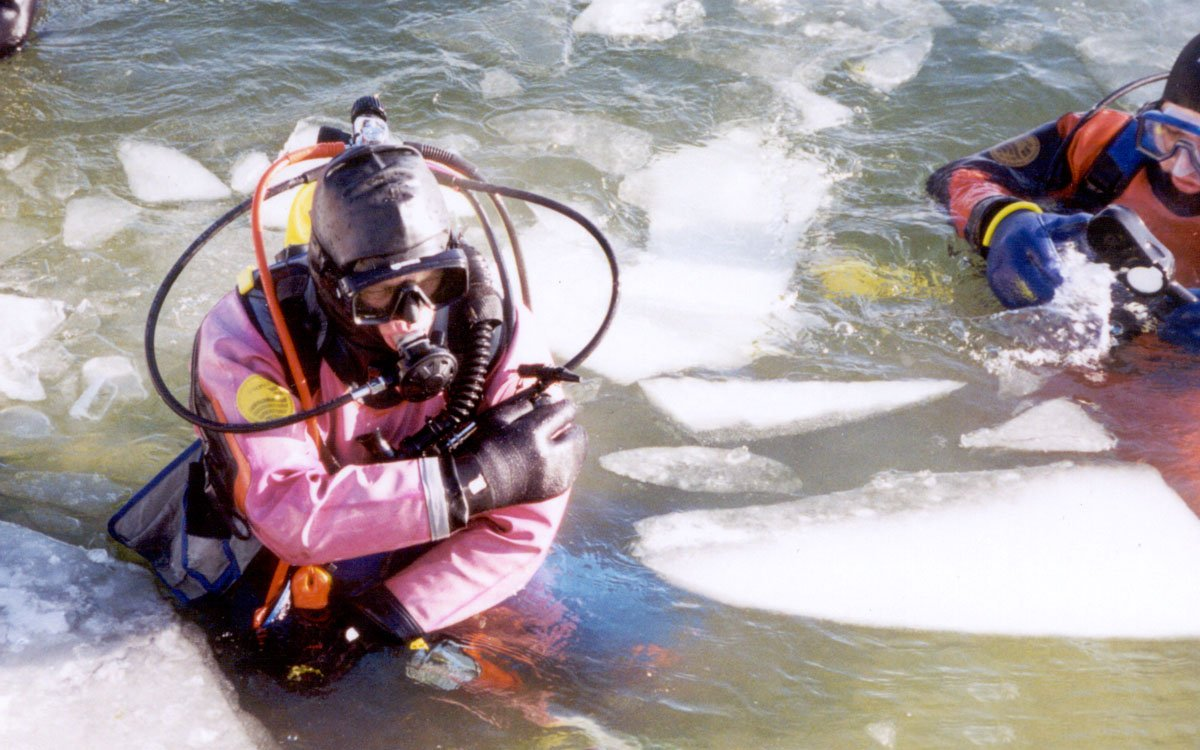
Dry suit in icy water

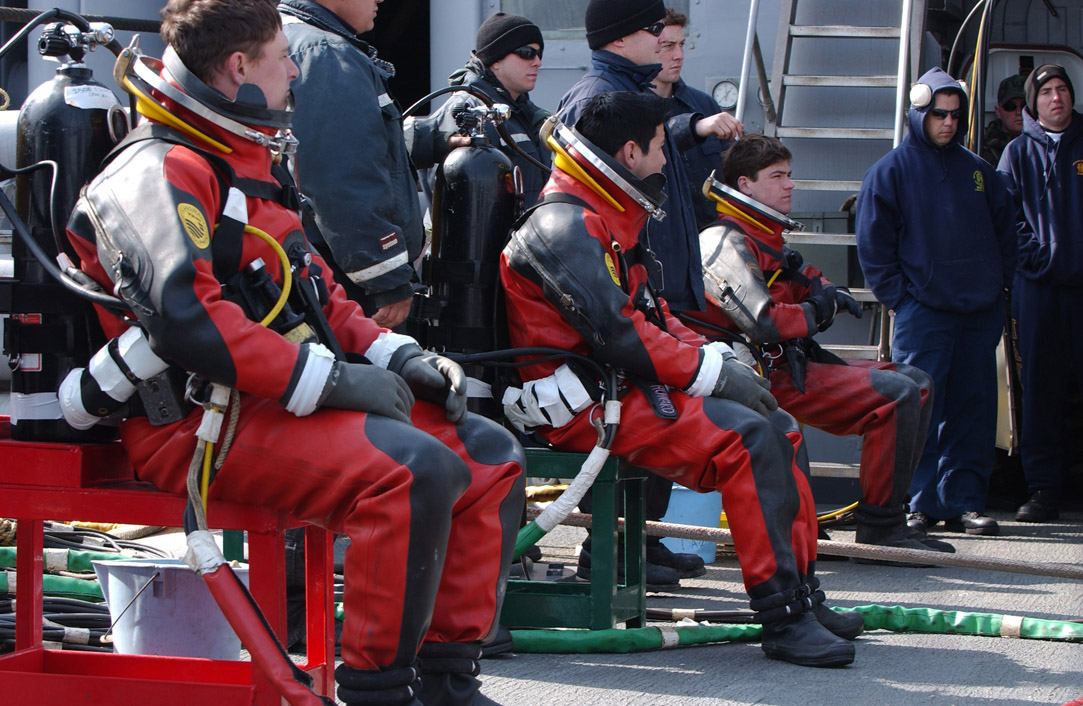
U.S. Navy divers prepare to dive in dry suits

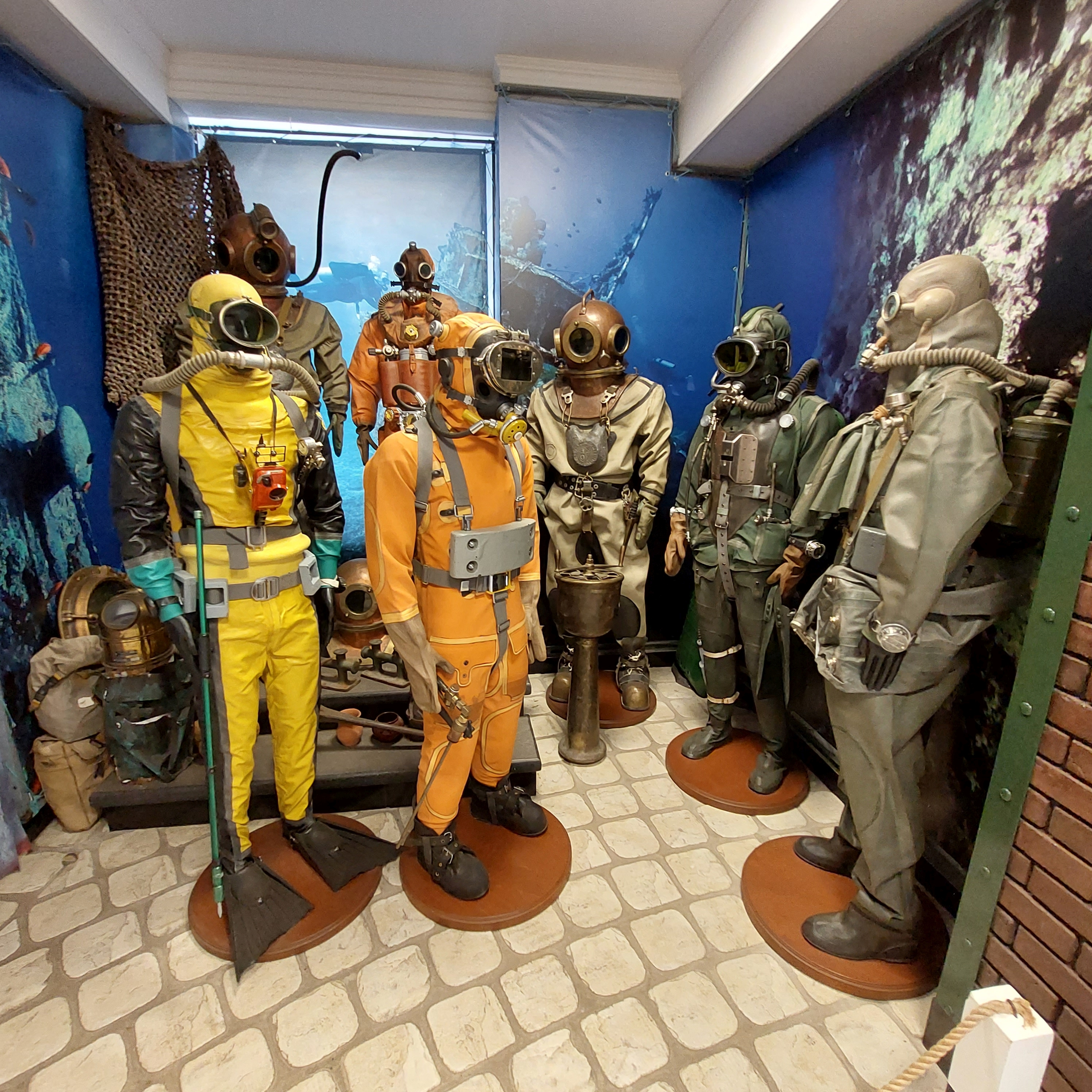
A museum display of diving dry suits with different breathing apparatus configurations

Dry suits are generally used where the water temperature is between −2 and 15 °C (28 and 59 °F). Water is prevented from entering the suit by seals at the neck and wrists and the opening for getting the suit on and off is typically closed by a waterproof zipper. The suit insulates the wearer by maintaining an insulating layer of air in the undersuit between the body and the suit shell, (in exactly the way that thermal insulation garments work above water) or by using a watertight expanded neoprene suit shell, which is inherently insulating in the same way as a wet suit, and which can usually be worn with additional insulating undergarments.

Both laminated fabric and neoprene drysuits have advantages and disadvantages: a fabric drysuit is more adaptable to varying water temperatures because different garments can be layered underneath. However, they are quite bulky and this causes increased drag and swimming effort. The woven materials are relatively inelastic and constrain joint mobility unless inflated to a fairly loose fit. Additionally, if a fabric drysuit malfunctions and floods, it loses nearly all of its insulating properties. Neoprene drysuits are comparatively streamlined like wetsuits and are more elastic, but in some cases do not allow garments to be layered underneath and are thus less adaptable to varying temperatures. An advantage of this construction is that even it if floods completely, it essentially becomes a wetsuit and will still provide a significant degree of insulation.

Special dry suits made of strong externally rubberised fabric are worn by commercial divers who work in contaminated environments such as sewage or hazardous chemicals. the smooth outer surface is easier to decontaminate. The hazmat dry suit has integral boots and is sealed to a diving helmet and dry gloves to prevent any contact with the hazardous material.

Constant volume dry suits have a system allowing the suit to be inflated to prevent "suit squeeze" caused by increasing pressure and to prevent excessive compression of the insulating undergarments. They also have vents allowing the excess air to escape from the suit during ascent.

For additional warmth, some dry suit users inflate their suits with argon, an inert gas which has superior thermal insulating properties compared to air. The argon is carried in a small cylinder, separate from the diver's breathing gas. This arrangement is frequently used when the breathing gas contains helium, which is a very poor insulator in comparison with other breathing gases.

=== Tubesuits ===
A tubesuit is a type of heating or cooling garment which is intended to be worn under the diving suit. It circulates heated or chilled water through closed circuit flexible tubes close to the wearers skin. It would normally be worn under a further layer of insulation to reduce heat transfer with the external environment. The circulating water can be supplied from a battery powered heat pump unit carried by the diver, making this type of thermal management suitable for scuba divers. A tubesuit can be worn under an environmentally sealed dry suit, suitable for use in contaminated water

=== Diving suit combinations ===
A "shortie" wetsuit or tunic may be worn over a full wetsuit for added insulation. Some vendors sell a very similar item and refer to it as a 'core warmer' when worn over another wetsuit. A "skin" may also be worn under a wetsuit. This practice started with divers wearing body tights under a wetsuit for extra warmth and to make donning and removing the wetsuit easier. A "skin" may also be worn as an undersuit beneath a drysuit in temperatures where a full undersuit is not necessary.

=== Accessories ===
- Gloves are often worn when diving, as thermal protection, as a form protection against the environment and work hazards, or both. Both dry and wet gloves are available. Dry gloves may be permanently bonded to the sleeves of a dry suit, or connected by a cuff-ring system.
- Foot protection is usually worn when diving, either under fins or as protection for the feet when diving heavy, where the diver moves around mainly by walking, in which case the boots may be weighted for better stability when standing. Boots are integral part of most dry suits, unless they are terminated by integral socks. Non-watertight boots may be worn over integral boots or neoprene socks for protection against the workplace hazards when the diver wears a wetsuit or hot-water suit.
- Hoods are generally worn for thermal protection if the diver does not use a helmet. Dry hoods are available, but relatively uncommon, and the usual arrangement is a neoprene hood which is a separate unit or part of the wetsuit.

== Atmospheric diving suits ==
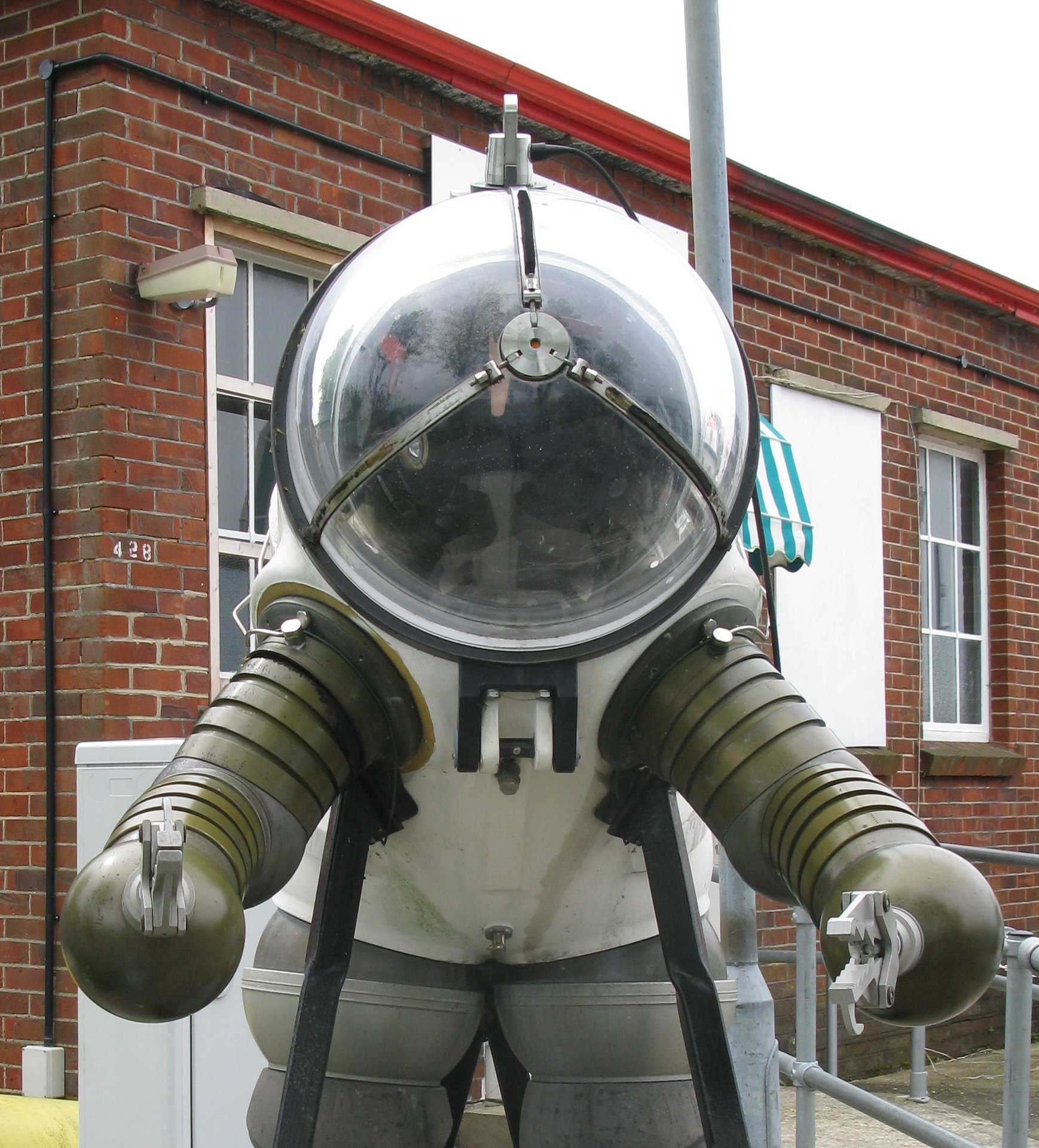
A JIM suit at the Royal Navy Submarine Museum.

An atmospheric diving suit is a small one-man articulated submersible of anthropomorphic form which resembles a suit of armour, with elaborate pressure joints to allow articulation while maintaining an internal pressure of one atmosphere.

These can be used for very deep dives for long periods without the need for decompression, and eliminate the majority of physiological dangers associated with deep diving. Divers do not even need to be skilled swimmers. Mobility and dexterity are usually restricted by mechanical constraints, and the ergonomics of movement are problematic.

== See also ==
- Exposure suit – Clothing to protect against an extreme environment
- Oilskin, also known as Foul weather gear – Waterproof garment made from treated sailcloth or canvas
- Personal protective equipment – Equipment designed to help protect an individual from hazards
- Survival suit – Waterproof suit that protects the wearer from hypothermia from immersion in cold water
- Timeline of diving technology – Chronological list of notable events in the history of underwater diving equipment
- Space suit – Garment worn to protect a human in space
- Standard diving dress – Copper helmet with rubberised canvas diving suit and weighted boots
