= Leroux =

Leroux or Le Roux may refer to:

- Leroux (surname), a surname of French or Breton origin
- Le Roux Smith Le Roux (1914–1963), South African artist, actor and broadcaster
- LeRoux, an American rock band

== Places ==
- Le Roux, Ardèche, a municipality in the Ardèche department, France
- Le Roux, Belgium, a village in the municipality of Fosses-la-Ville, Namur province, Belgium

== See also ==
- La Roux, an English synthpop duo
  - La Roux (album), their 2009 debut studio album
- Roux (disambiguation)
