= Leroux (surname) =

Leroux (mostly northwestern France), LeRoux (American spelling), Le Roux (mostly Brittany, as a translation of Breton Ar Rouz or Ar Ruz) or Roux (mostly southeastern France, as a translation of Occitan Ros) is a surname of French origin meaning "red-haired" or "red-skinned" and may also come in certain cases (e.g. with the spelling Le Roux) from Breton Ar Roue meaning ″The King″. It may refer to:

== People ==
- Adélaïde Leroux (born 1982), French actress
- AJ le Roux (born 1990), South African rugby player
- Alain Le Roux (c. 1040–1093), associate of William I of England
- Antoine Leroux (fl. 1846–1853), New Mexico mountain man
- Auguste Leroux (1871–1954), French painter
- Beau Leroux (born 2003), American soccer player
- Bernard Le Roux (born 1989), South African-born French rugby player
- Bruno Le Roux (born 1965), French politician
- Buddy LeRoux (1930–2008), American businessman and baseball club owner
- Charles C.-J. Le Roux (1724-?), French educator, inventor, and physicist
- Charles Le Roux (1814–1895), French painter
- Charles Leroux (1856–1889), American balloonist and parachutist
- Chelazon Leroux, Indigenous Canadian drag queen
- Chris Leroux (born 1984), Canadian baseball pitcher
- Christine Barkhuizen le Roux (1959–2020), South African writer
- Claudine Le Roux (born 1964), French canoer
- Christophe Le Roux (born 1969), French footballer
- Daniel Le Roux (1933–2016), South African footballer
- Doppies le Roux (born 1985), South African rugby player
- Etienne Leroux (1922–1989), South African writer
- François Le Roux (born 1955), French baritone
- François Leroux (born 1970), Canadian ice hockey player
- Fred le Roux (1882–1963), South African cricketer
- Garth Le Roux (born 1955), South African cricketer
- Gaspard Le Roux (1660–1707), French harpsichordist
- Gaston Leroux (1868–1927), French journalist, detective, and novelist
- Gaston Leroux (ice hockey) (1913–1988), Canadian ice hockey player
- Gaston Leroux (politician) (born 1948), Canadian politician
- Grant le Roux (born 1986), South African rugby player
- Hennie le Roux (born 1967), South African rugby player
- Isabel Le Roux (born 1987), South African sprinter
- Jean Leroux (born 1949), Canadian politician
- Jean-Marie Le Roux (1863–1949), French mathematician
- Jean Paul Leroux, Venezuelan actor
- Jean-Yves Leroux (born 1976), Canadian ice hockey player
- Josephine Leroux (1747–1794), French Ursuline nun
- Lash LeRoux (born 1976), American wrestler
- Laura Leroux-Revault (1872–1936) French artist and painter, daughter of Louis Hector Leroux.
- Laurent Leroux (1759–1855), Canadian businessman and politician
- Le Roux Smith Le Roux (1914–1963), South African artist, actor and broadcaster
- Louis Héctor Leroux (1829–1900), French painter, father of Laura Leroux-Revault.
- Louis Napoleon Le Roux (1890–1944), Breton nationalist
- Louise-Zulmée Le Roux (1804–1874), singing teacher
- Maurice Le Roux (1923–1992), French composer and conductor
- Maxime Leroux (1951–2010), French actor
- Ollie le Roux (born 1973), South African rugby player
- Paul Le Roux (born 1972), Rhodesia-born programmer, criminal cartel boss and DEA informant
- P. K. Le Roux (1904–1985), South African politician
- Pierre Leroux (1797–1871), French philosopher and political economist
- Pierre Leroux (author) (born 1958), Canadian novelist, journalist and screenwriter
- Pieter Louis Le Roux (1865–1943), South African missionary
- Robert Leroux (sociologist) (born 1964), Canadian sociologist
- Robert Leroux (fencer) (born 1967), French fencer
- Roulland Le Roux (fl. 1508–1527), French architect
- Shaun Le Roux (born 1986), South African squash player
- Sydney Leroux (born 1990), Canadian-American soccer player
- Willie le Roux (born 1989), South African rugby player
- Xavier Leroux (1863–1919), French composer
- Yvon Le Roux (born 1960), French football player
- Zulmée Leroux (1795–1877), French opera singer

== Fictional characters ==
- Françoise Leroux, aka “Femme Leroux”, character of Le Labyrinthe du monde (Memoirs) by Marguerite Yourcenar
- Leroux, in Night Flight by Antoine de Saint-Exupéry
- Leroux, in L’Armée des ombres (Army of Shadows) by Joseph Kessel
- Louis Leroux, from the fifth season of the video game series Criminal Case
- Messieurs Leroux, characters of Arsène Lupin contre Herlock Sholmès by Maurice Leblanc
- Pierre Leroux, from the novel A French Lover by Taslima Nasrin
- Zommari Leroux, villain from the manga Bleach

== See also ==
- Marie-Élisabeth Laville-Leroux (1770–1826), French painter
- De Roux
- Roux (surname)
- Rio (disambiguation)
- Ríos (disambiguation)
- LaRue
