= Roux (surname) =

Roux is a French surname. Notable people with the surname include:

- Roux family (marine painters), a family of French hydrographers and marine painters
- Albert Roux (1935–2021), French restaurateur
- Alexander Roux (1813–1886), French émigré cabinet-maker
- Ambroise Roux (1921–1999), French businessman
- Anton Roux (born 1981), South African cricketer
- Antoine Roux, French marine artist
- Arsène Roux (1893–1971), French Arabist and Berberologist
- Benoît Roux, American biophysicist
- Carol Roux, American actor of the 1960s
- César Roux (1857–1934), Swiss surgeon, eponym of the surgical procedure Roux-en-Y (Y-shaped Roux)
- Claude Roux (born 1945), French lichenologist
- Émile Roux, French physician and immunologist
- Frédéric Roux, French footballer
- Gilles Roux, inventor of the efficient Roux method for solving the Rubik's Cube
- Georges Roux (1914–1999) Assyriologist
- Guillermo Roux, Argentine painter
- Guy Roux (born 1938), French footballer
- Jacques Roux (1752–1794), French revolutionary
- Jean Roux (1876–1939), Swiss herpetologist
- Jean-Paul Roux (1925–2009), French Orientalist/historian
- Jean-François Roux, Canadian politician
- Jean-Louis Roux, Canadian entertainer and politician
- Kenneth Roux, American virologist
- Laëtitia Roux (born 1985), French ski mountaineer
- Lionel Roux, French tennis player
- Ludovic Roux, French skier
- Luis Roux Cabral, Uruguayan chess player
- Michel Roux (1941–2020), French restaurateur
- Michel Roux Jr., French restaurateur
- Michel Roux (actor), French actor
- Michel Roux (baritone), French opera singer
- Nolan Roux (born 1988), French footballer playing for Lille
- Paul Hendrik Roux (1862–1911), South African Protestant pastor and Boer War general
- Sandrine Roux (born 1966), French footballer
- Sophie Roux (born 1965), French historian of science
- Storm Roux, New Zealand association football player
- Wilhelm Roux (1850–1924), German zoologist and embryologist

== See also ==
- Roux (disambiguation)
- De Roux, a surname
- Leroux (surname)
- Harry A. Reoux (1901–1968), American politician
- Rio (disambiguation)
- Ríos (disambiguation)
