= Daniel Garber (philosopher) =

American philosopher (born 1949)

Daniel E. Garber
- Born: September 26, 1949 (age 76) (United States)

Education
- Education: Harvard University (B.A.) Harvard University (PhD)
- Thesis: '"A Theory of Justification"' (1975)
- Doctoral advisors: Roderick Firth; Hilary Putnam

Philosophical work
- Era: Contemporary philosophy Medieval Philosophy
- Region: Western philosophy
- School: Analytic philosophy Enlightenment philosophy
- Institutions: University of Chicago; Princeton University; Harvard University
- Doctoral students: James Otteson
- Main interests: History of Philosophy; Epistemology; Metaphysics; Political Philosophy; Philosophy of Science; Philosophy of Mathematics

Daniel Eliot Garber (born 1949) is an American philosopher. He is the A. Watson Armour, III, University Professor of Philosophy at Princeton University. He is a specialist in the history of early modern philosophy and science.

== Education and career ==
Garber earned all his degrees from Harvard University, including his Ph.D. in philosophy in 1975 under the direction of Roderick Firth and Hilary Putnam. He taught at the University of Chicago from 1975 until joining the Princeton faculty in 2002.

He is an elected Fellow of the American Academy of Arts & Sciences. He is also consulting editor of the Journal of the History of Ideas.

== Selected publications ==
=== Authored books ===
- Descartes's Metaphysical Physics (University of Chicago Press, 1992).
- Descartes Embodied: Reading Cartesian Philosophy through Cartesian Science (Cambridge University Press, 2001).
- Leibniz: Body, Substance, Monad (Oxford: Oxford University Press, 2009).

=== Edited books ===
- Leibniz: Philosophical Essays (translated and edited with Roger Ariew) (Hackett Press, 1989).
- The Cambridge History of Seventeenth-Century Philosophy (with Michael R. Ayers) (Cambridge University Press, 1998).
- Kant and the Early Moderns (with Béatrice Longuenesse) (Princeton University Press, 2008).
- The Mechanization of Natural Philosophy (with Sophie Roux) (Dordrecht: Spring, 2013).
- Oxford Studies in Early Modern Philosophy: Volume XII (with Donald Rutherford), 2025.
- Oxford Studies in Early Modern Philosophy: Volume III (with Steven Nadler), 2006.

=== Articles ===
- "Old evidence and logical omniscience in Bayesian confirmation theory," in J. Earman (ed.), Minnesota Studies in the Philosophy of Science, vol. 10 (1983), pp. 99-131.
