= Steven Nadler =

American academic and philosopher (born 1958)

- Born: Steven Mitchell Nadler; November 11, 1958 (age 67); New York City, U.S.
- Occupations: Academic; philosopher
- Spouse: Jane Carole Bernstein (m. 1984)
- Children: 2

Academic background
- Education: Washington University in St. Louis (B.A.); Columbia University (M.A., Ph.D.)
- Thesis: Arnauld's Theory of Perception: A Study in the Cartesian Philosophy of Ideas (1986)

Steven Mitchell Nadler (born November 11, 1958) is an American academic and philosopher who is the Vilas Research Professor and the William H. Hay II Professor of Philosophy at the University of Wisconsin–Madison.

== Education and career ==
Born in New York City, Nadler received his B.A. from Washington University in St. Louis in 1980 and his M.A. and Ph.D. from Columbia University in 1981 and 1986. He has taught at the University of Wisconsin–Madison since 1988 and has been a visiting professor of philosophy at Stanford University, the University of Chicago, the Ecole des hautes études en sciences sociales and École normale supérieure in Paris, and the University of Amsterdam.

In November 2006, he presented at the "Beyond Belief: Science, Religion, Reason and Survival" symposium. In 2007, he held the Spinoza Chair at the University of Amsterdam.

From 2004 to 2007, he was the Max and Frieda Weinstein-Bascom Professor of Jewish Studies at the University of Wisconsin–Madison.

From 2010 to 2015 he was the editor of the Journal of the History of Philosophy.

In April 2015, he was a Scholar in Residence at the American Academy in Rome. In the same year, he was invited to sit on an advisory board at a symposium held by the Amsterdam Talmud Torah congregation to discuss the lifting of the cherem on 17th-century Jewish philosopher Baruch Spinoza, which had been imposed in 1656 on account of his views on the God of the Torah, which were condemned as heretical.

In 2020, Nadler was elected a Fellow of the American Academy of Arts and Sciences.

== Philosophical work ==
Nadler's research focus is on Descartes, Spinoza, and Leibniz.

== Personal life ==
Nadler married Jane Carole Bernstein in 1984. They have two children.

== Selected publications ==
=== Books ===
- Arnauld and the Cartesian Philosophy of Ideas. Manchester: Manchester University Press. 1989. ISBN 9780719025099.
- Malebranche and Ideas. Oxford: Oxford University Press. 1992. ISBN 9780195077247.
- Editor, Causation in Early Modern Philosophy: Cartesianism, Occasionalism, and Preestablished Harmony. University Park, Pennsylvania: Penn State University Press. 1993. ISBN 9780271026572.
- Editor, Causation in Early Modern Philosophy (Penn State Press, 1993) ISBN 0-271-02657-X.
- Spinoza: A Life (Cambridge University Press, 1999) – Winner of the 2000 Koret Jewish Book Award ISBN 0-521-00293-1. Second edition published in 2018.
- Editor, The Cambridge Companion to Malebranche (Cambridge University Press, 2000) ISBN 0-521-62729-X.
- Editor, A Companion to Early Modern Philosophy (Blackwell, 2002) ISBN 0-631-21800-9.
- Spinoza's Heresy: Immortality and the Jewish Mind (Oxford, 2002) ISBN 0-19-924707-2.
- Rembrandt's Jews (University of Chicago Press, 2003) – Finalist for the Pulitzer Prize for General Nonfiction in 2004. ISBN 0-226-56737-0.
- Co-editor (with Manfred Walther and Elhanan Yakira), Spinoza and Jewish Identity (Konigshausen & Neumann, 2003) ISBN 3-8260-2715-9.
- Co-editor (with Daniel Garber), Oxford Studies in Early Modern Philosophy: Volume III (Oxford University Press, 2006) ISBN 0-19-920394-6.
- Spinoza's Ethics: An Introduction (Cambridge, 2006) ISBN 0-521-83620-4.
- The Best of All Possible Worlds: A Story of Philosophers, God, and Evil (Farrar, Straus & Giroux, 2008; paperback, Princeton University Press, 2010).
- A Book Forged in Hell: Spinoza's Scandalous Treatise and the Birth of the Secular Age (Princeton University Press, 2011).
- Occasionalism: Causation Among the Cartesians (Oxford University Press, 2011) ISBN 9780198250081.
- The Philosopher, the Priest, and the Painter: A Portrait of Descartes (Princeton University Press, 2013).
- Editor, Spinoza and Medieval Jewish Philosophy (Cambridge University Press, 2014).
- Editor and Translator of Géraud de Cordemoy, Six Discourses on the Distinction Between the Body and the Soul and Discourses on Metaphysics (Oxford University Press, 2015).
- With Ben Nadler, illustrator: Heretics! The Wondrous (and Dangerous) Beginnings of Modern Philosophy (Princeton University Press, 2017).
- Menasseh ben Israel: Rabbi of Amsterdam (Yale University Press, 2018) – Jewish Lives Series.
- Spinoza: A Life (Cambridge University Press, 2nd edition, 2018) ISBN 9781108425544.
- Think Least of Death: Spinoza on How to Live and How to Die (Princeton University Press, 2020).
- The Portraitist: Frans Hals and His World (University of Chicago Press, 2022).
- Descartes: The Renewal of Philosophy (Reaktion Books, 2023).
- Spinoza e Aristotele sull'amicizia [in Italian] (ed. by G. M. Arrigo, Mimesis, 2023) ISBN 9791222304359.
- Why Read Maimonides Today? (Cambridge University Press, 2026) ISBN 978-1009304733
- Spinoza, Atheist (Princeton University Press, 2026) ISBN 9780691285238.

=== Book reviews ===
Year	Review article	Work(s) reviewed
2018	Nadler, Steven (August 3, 2018). "Flesh-and-blood Descartes". The Times Literary Supplement. 6018.	Cook, Harold John (2018). The Young Descartes: Nobility, Rumor, and War. University of Chicago Press.

=== Essays ===
- Nadler, Steven (2016-04-28). "Why Spinoza Still Matters". Aeon.
- Nadler, Steven (2018-08-10). "We Have an Ethical Obligation to Relieve Individual Animal Suffering". Aeon.
- "Virtue, reason, and moral luck: Maimonides, Gersonides, Spinoza". In Spinoza and Medieval Jewish Philosophy, edited by Steven Nadler. United Kingdom: Cambridge University Press, 2014.
- "Spinoza on the Divinity of Scripture". In Spinoza and Modern Jewish Philosophy, edited by Michael Rosenthal. New York: Palgrave Macmillan, forthcoming.
