= Roux (disambiguation) =

Roux as a culinary term indicates a mixture of flour and fat used as the basis of various sauces.

Roux may also refer to:

== Places ==
- Roux, Belgium, a village in the province of Hainault
- Roux Island, Graham Land, Antarctica
- Cape Roux, Brabant Island, Palmer Archipelago, off the northwestern coast of the Antarctic Peninsula

== Other uses ==
- Roux (surname), a French surname
- Roux de Marcilly (died 1669), Huguenot conspirator
- Roux, pseudonym of the cartoonist Burton Silver
- Roux Louka, female protagonist in the 1986 anime television series Mobile Suit Gundam ZZ

== See also ==
- Roux culture bottle, a type of laboratory glassware used to grow microorganisms or tissue cells
- Leroux (disambiguation)
- Roux Method of solving a Rubik's Cube
- Robux, the virtual currency of Roblox
- Roux Brothers (disambiguation)
- Rio (disambiguation)
- Ríos (disambiguation)
