= Monique de Roux =

French painter and engraver (born 1946)

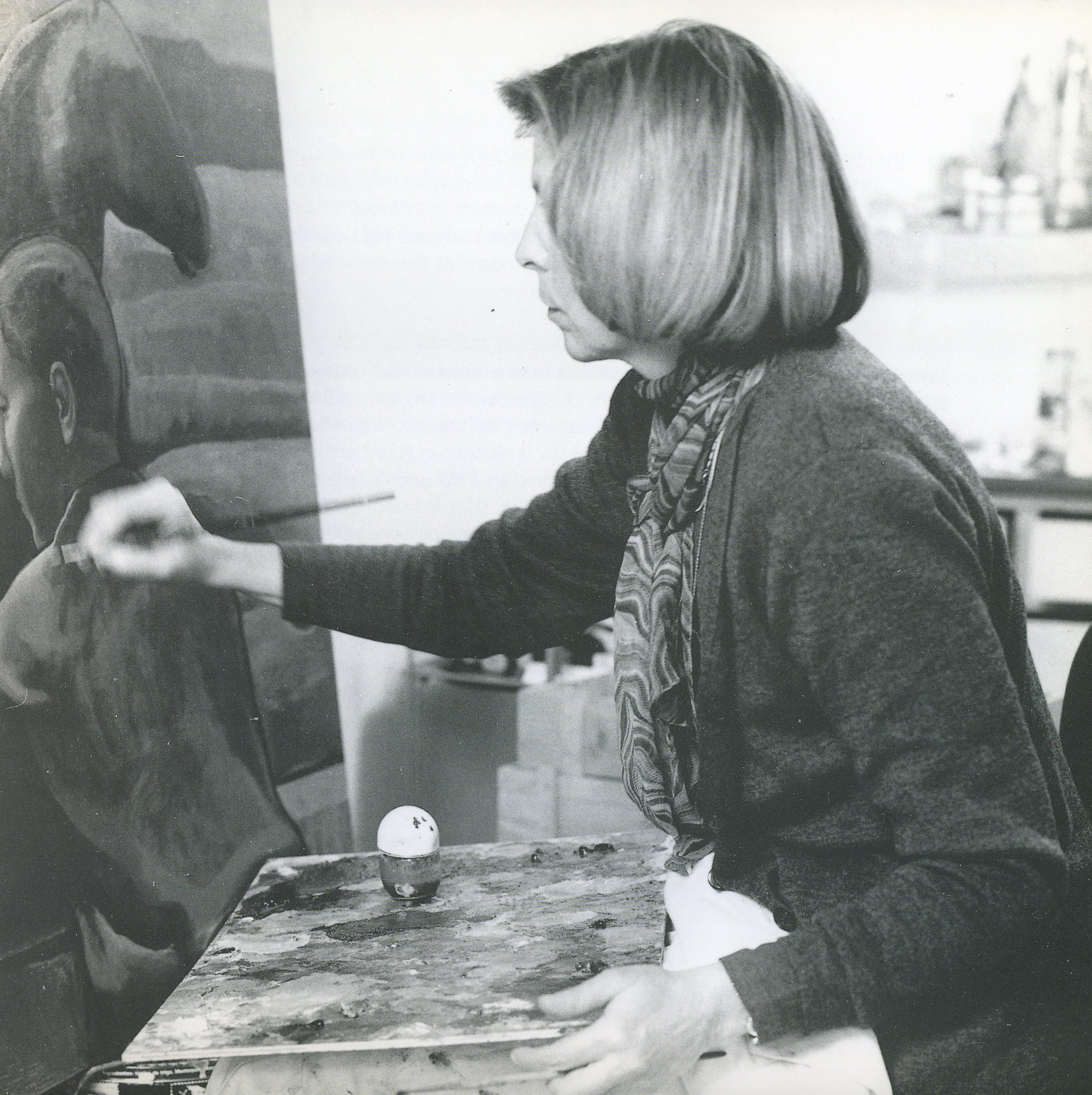
Monique de Roux

Monique de Roux (born 1946 in Boulogne-Billancourt) is a French painter and engraver. She lives and works in Spain.

== Biography ==
Sister of the writer Dominique de Roux, of the sailor Jacques de Roux, of the lawyer and politician Xavier de Roux and of the journalist Emmanuel de Roux, she grew up in Algeria until she was six before moving to Paris. During a visit in a museum, she experienced a first aesthetic shock in front of The Sleeping Gipsy by Henri Rousseau, soon followed by one of the masters of Quattrocento, particularly Fra Angelico.

She studied at the École nationale supérieure des Beaux-Arts in Paris, specialized in engraving, from 1965 to 1968, and then completed her education the following year at the Real Academia de Bellas Artes de San Fernando in Madrid where she settled with her husband.

Her first solo exhibition was at the gallery La Maison pour tous in Paris in 1969. In the 70’s, she had numerous engraving exhibitions in Spain. Dominated by dark colors, her artwork is then characterized by dusk visions with troubling models, unmoving people and birds in a cage. She was awarded the engraving prize "Carmen Arozena" in 1980 and, four years later, the "Máximo Ramos" prize.

At the same time, she became interested in painting. In 1984, she was selected for attended the courses of the painter Antonio López García at the Fine Arts Circle in Madrid. The following year, she moved with her family to Panama where she taught engraving in a studio of the Museum of Contemporary Art (MAC). This 4-years stay in Central America had a decisive influence on her art.

Back to Madrid, the Mapfre foundation awarded her the drawing prize "Penagos" in 1990. Since, she regularly exhibits in Europe and in Central America.

In 2005, she achieved the reprint of her engraving work with the publisher Victor Galán. Five years later, the National Library of Madrid accepted the donation from the artist of 130 engravings which almost cover all of her graphic production. In 2016, Monique de Roux was one of the engravers invited for artistic residency at the Xuyuan Center in Beijing, in collaboration with the Instituto Cervantes and the National Chalcography in Madrid. To mark the 400th anniversary of the death of Miguel de Cervantes, each artist created large etchings on the theme of the Knight-errant which were shown in Beijing at the end of their residency.

== Exhibitions (selection) ==
- 1994: Herold Gallery, Bruxelles. Galería Habitante, Panamá
- 1998: Inhabitant Gallery, Panama
- 2000: Nolde Gallery, Navacerrada, Madrid
- 2010: Drawings, Galería Pelayo47, Madrid. Galerie Alain Blondel, Paris
- 2014: Galería Pelayo47, Madrid
