= Vildebon-Winceslas Larue =

Canadian politician

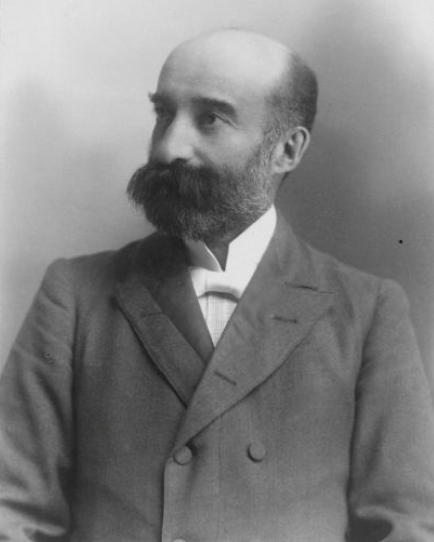

Member of the Legislative Council of Quebec for La Salle
- In office 1896–1906
- Preceded by: Praxède Larue
- Succeeded by: Charles-Eugène Dubord

Personal details
- Born: October 3, 1851 Saint-Pierre-de-la-Rivière-du-Sud, Canada East
- Died: January 8, 1906 (aged 54) Quebec City, Quebec
- Party: Conservative

Vildebon-Winceslas Larue (October 3, 1851 – January 8, 1906) was a member of the Legislative Council of Quebec.

A notary by profession, Larue opened his practice in 1873 and was chairman of the Chamber of Notaries from 1891 to 1894. He served as president of Compagnie d'assurance manufacturière permanente de Québec and a director of the Caisse d'économie de Québec, the Quebec Building Society, and the Compagnie de pulpe de Chicoutimi and was also involved with the Chronicle and L'Event newspapers.

From 1868 to 1874 he was a lieutenant of the 61st Battalion.

Larue was appointed a Legislative Councillor for La Salle district in 1896 succeeding his cousin, Praxède Larue and was a representative of the Conservative Party of Quebec. He was Speaker of the body from January to June 1897.

He died in office in 1906.
