= Praxède Larue =

Canadian politician (1823–1902)

Member of the Legislative Council of Quebec for La Salle
- In office 1885–1896
- Preceded by: Louis Panet
- Succeeded by: Vildebon-Winceslas Larue

Member of the Legislative Assembly of Quebec for Portneuf
- In office 1867–1878
- Succeeded by: François Langelier

Personal details
- Born: September 2, 1823 Saint-Antoine-de-Tilly, Lower Canada
- Died: November 29, 1902 (aged 79) Saint-Augustin-de-Desmaures
- Party: Conservative

Praxède Larue (September 2, 1823 – November 29, 1902) was a physician and political figure in Quebec. He represented Portneuf in the Legislative Assembly of Quebec from 1867 to 1878 as a Conservative.

He was born François-Xavier-Praxède in Saint-Antoine-de-Tilly, Lower Canada, the son of Martin-Damase Larue and Marie-des-Anges Lefebvre. Larue was the grandson of François-Xavier Larue who served in the Lower Canada assembly. He was educated at the Petit Séminaire de Québec, studied medicine, was licensed to practise in 1844 and set up practice at Saint-Augustin-de-Desmaures. In 1859, he married Henriette Couture. Larue served as president of the Hygiene Council for Quebec and was founder and president of the Colonization Society for Portneuf County. He was also a founding member of the Société Canadienne d’Études Littéraires et Scientifiques. In 1885, he was named to the Legislative Council of Quebec for La Salle division and served until 1896. He died at Saint-Augustin-de-Desmaures at the age of 70.

His cousin Vildebon-Winceslas Larue succeeded him as a member of the Legislative Council.
