= Charles Le Roux =

French painter

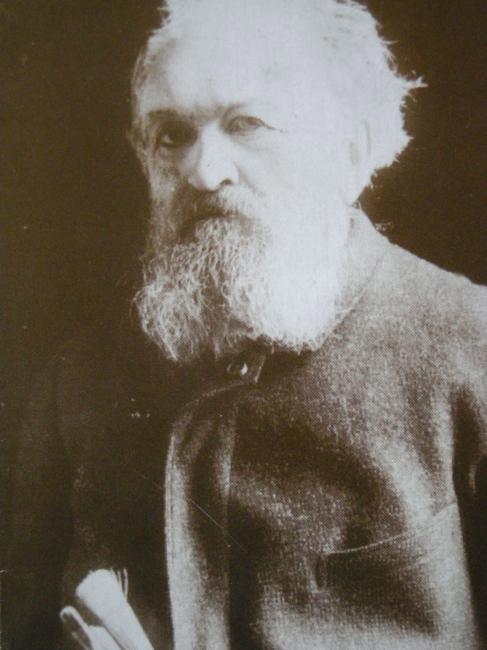
Charles Le Roux

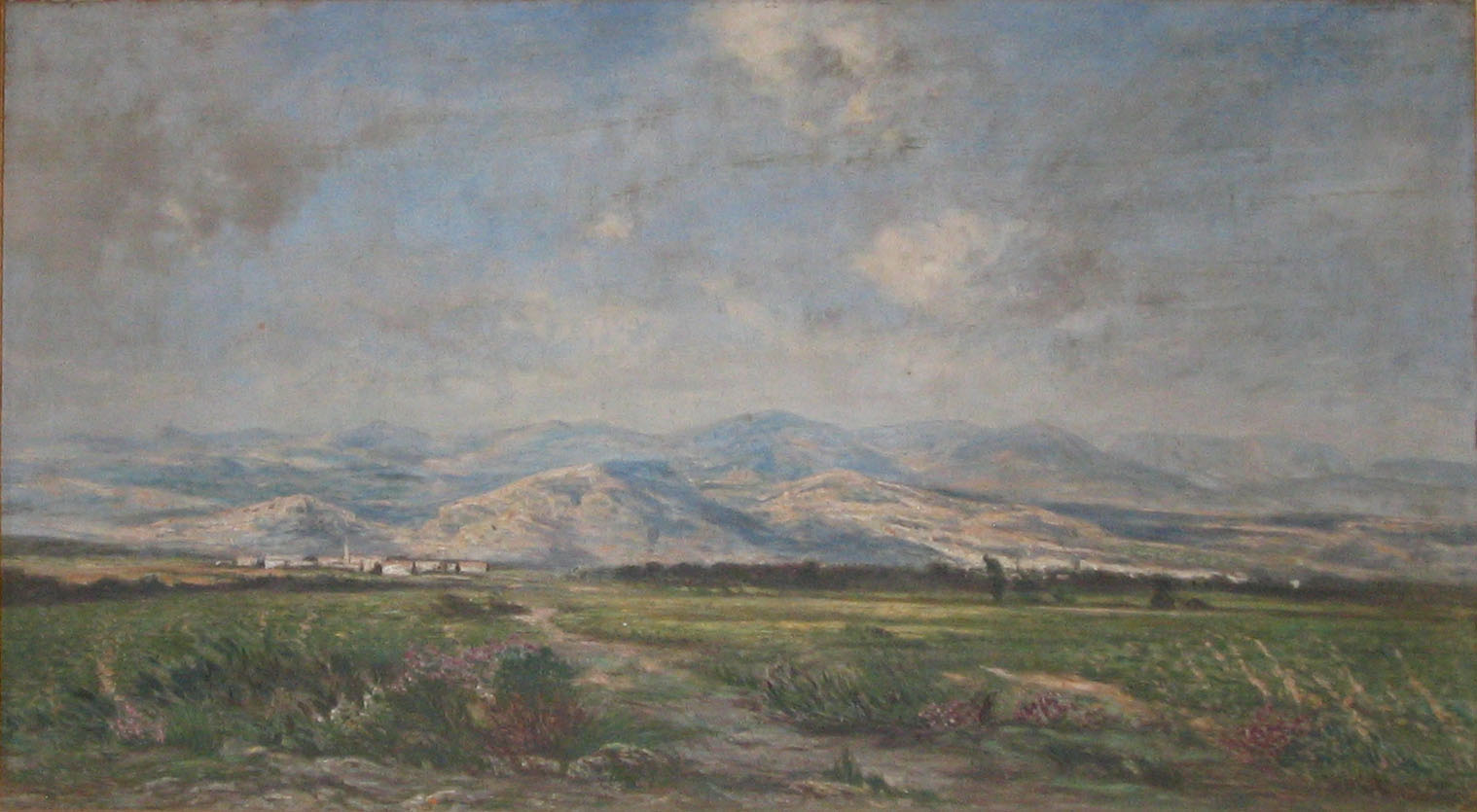
Paysage près de Narbonne ("Landscape near Narbonne"), by Charles Le Roux.

Marie-Guillaume Charles Le Roux (1814–1895) was a landscape painter of the Barbizon school. He was born and died in Nantes, and is noted for his paintings of the Loire and its surroundings.

He was a pupil of Jean-Baptiste-Camille Corot and a friend of Théodore Rousseau and Gustave Dore. Having inherited a fortune, he did not have to sell his works.

Museums holding works by Le Roux include the Musée des Beaux-Arts de Nantes. His painting Edge of the Woods; Cherry Trees in Autumn, which was painted in the last year (1895) of the artist's life, was exhibited in the Exposition Universelle of 1900, and is in the collection of the Musée d’Orsay.
