= Sophie Roux =

French historian of science

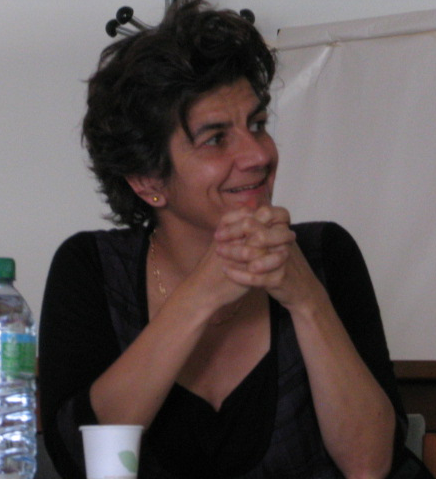
Roux in 2011

Sophie Roux (born 1965) is a French historian of science and philosopher of science focusing on the early modern period of European science, including Cartesianism and its opponents, thought experiments and mathematical modeling, and the history of the philosophy of science. She is a professor of the history and philosophy of science at the École normale supérieure (Paris).

== Education and career ==
Roux was born in Paris in 1965. She was a student at the École normale supérieure beginning in 1984, and passed the agrégation in philosophy in 1987. She earned two Master of Advanced Studies degrees, one in philosophy through Paris 1 Panthéon-Sorbonne University under the direction of Michel Serres in 1989, and a second one in history of science through the School for Advanced Studies in the Social Sciences (EHESS) under the direction of Ernest Coumet. Continuing to work with Coumet at EHESS, she completed a Ph.D. in 1996, with the dissertation La philosophie mécanique (1630–1690).

After postdoctoral research at the Max Planck Institute for the History of Science in Berlin, she became a professeur agrégé at EHESS in 1998, and an assistant professor of early modern philosophy at Pierre Mendès-France University in Grenoble in 2002. While holding this appointment, she earned a habilitation in 2010 through the École normale supérieure de Lyon. In 2012, she took her present position as a professor at the École normale supérieure.

== Books ==
Roux is the author of:

- L'Essai de logique de Mariotte: archéologie des idées d'un savant ordinaire (Histoire et philosophie des sciences 2, Classiques Garnier, 2011)

Her edited works include:

- Retours sur l'affaire Sokal (edited with Gilles Denis and Marie-José Durand-Richard, L'Harmattan, 2007)
- Mechanics and Cosmology in the Medieval and Early Modern Period (edited with Massimo Bucciantini and Michele Camerota, Leo S. Olschki, 2007)
- Thought Experiments in Methodological and Historical Contexts (edited with Katerina Ierodiakonou, Brill, 2011)
- The Mechanization of Natural Philosophy (edited with Daniel Garber, Springer, 2013)
- L’Automate : Modèle Métaphore Machine Merveille (edited with Aurélia Gaillard, Jean-Yves Goffi, and Bernard Roukhomovsky, Presses universitaires de Bordeaux, 2013)
- Œuvres d’Ernest Coumet (Tome 1) (edited with Thierry Martin, Presses Universitaires de Franche-comté, 2016)
- Louis Couturat (1868–1914) : Mathématiques, langage, philosophie (edited with Michel Fichant, Classiques Garnier, 2017)

== Recognition ==
Roux was named a junior member of the Institut Universitaire de France in 2006.
