= François-Xavier Larue =

Canadian politician

François-Xavier Larue (1763 – July 13, 1855) was a farmer, notary and political figure in Lower Canada.

He was born in Pointe-aux-Trembles in 1763. He articled as a notary with Pierre-Louis Deschenaux, qualified to practice in 1788 and set up practice at Pointe-aux-Trembles. He farmed on land there in the seigneury of Neuville. He was elected to the Legislative Assembly of Lower Canada for Hampshire in 1810; he did not run again in 1814. Larue served as a major in the local militia during the War of 1812. He was named justice of the peace for Quebec district in 1815. He was elected to the assembly for Hampshire again in an 1826 by-election held after the election of John Cannon was overturned on appeal. Larue served until 1830, when the riding was renamed Portneuf. He represented that riding until the constitution was suspended following the Lower Canada Rebellion. Larue voted in support of the Ninety-Two Resolutions. From 1832 to 1845, he was agent for the seigneur of Neuville, his grandson Édouard-Wilbrod Larue. After he retired from politics, he returned to his practice as a notary.

He died at Pointe-aux-Trembles in 1855.

His grandson Praxède Larue served in the legislative assembly and legislative council for Quebec.

== Bibliography ==
- "Biography of François-Xavier Larue". Dictionnaire des parlementaires du Québec de 1792 à nos jours (in French). National Assembly of Quebec.
- Roberts, David (1985). "Larue, François-Xavier". In Halpenny, Francess G. (ed.). Dictionary of Canadian Biography. Vol. VIII (1851–1860) (online ed.). University of Toronto Press.
