= Charles C.-J. Le Roux =

French educator, inventor, and physicist

Charles C.-J. Le Roux (born 1724) was a French educator, inventor, and physicist.

Le Roux began teaching around 1758 in Amiens, France, and relocated to Paris some ten years or so after that, working there as Maître de Pension at a boarding school. During this time, he also held public scientific experiments and became the main author of the Journal d’Éducation, the first periodical dedicated to the educational landscape in France. In this publication, he advocated for a different approach to teaching children: specifically one with less emphasis on learning Greek and Latin, and more consideration placed towards the character and quality of the instruction itself.

He was also an inventor and created a waterproof and windproof fabric which could be made into diving suits. Le Roux became acquainted with Benjamin Franklin through their mutual interest in education and school-reform, and Franklin would often receive invitations to Le Roux's experiments. He was elected as a member of the American Philosophical Society in 1775. By 1780 Le Roux had earned the title Physicien en l’Université de Paris, though his journal seemed to have run dry of funding by this time, and Le Roux wrote to Franklin proposing an extension to the project. This, however, never came to fruition.
