= Dominique de Roux =

French writer and publisher

- Born: November 17, 1935; Boulogne-Billancourt, France
- Died: March 29, 1977 (aged 41); Suresnes, France
- Occupations: Writer, publisher
- Writing career
- Genres: Novel, essay

Dominique de Roux (17 September 1935 – 29 March 1977) was a French writer and publisher.

== Early life ==
Dominique de Roux was born in a Languedoc noble family that was close to monarchist circles (his grandfather, Marie de Roux, was the lawyer of Charles Maurras and Action Française). While deeply attached to his Charente land, Dominique de Roux showed an early independence and the desire to devote himself to literature.

In 1960 he married Jacqueline Brusset, daughter of Gaullist deputy Max Brusset. Their son Pierre-Guillaume Roux was born in 1963 and later became a publisher.

== Career ==
In the late 1950s de Roux created several language courses in Germany, Spain and England. Upon his return to France, he founded with several friends (including his brother Xavier de Roux, his sister Marie-Helene de Roux and Jean Thibaudeau) the mimeographed bulletin L'Herne, where he published his "Confidences to Guillaume", a chronicle of lyrical cynicism addressed to his geranium. He served in the French military.

In 1960 he published his first novel, Mademoiselle Anicet, and redeveloped his review in the final form of the Cahiers de l'Herne, a collection of monographs devoted to ignored or cursed literary figures, including articles, documents and unpublished texts. After volumes on René-Guy Cadou (1961) and Georges Bernanos (1962), he penned books about Borges, Louis-Ferdinand Celine, Ezra Pound, Witold Gombrowicz and Pierre Jean Jouve. He directed books devoted to Burroughs, Pélieu, Henri Michaux, Ungaretti, Louis Massignon, Lewis Carroll, H. P. Lovecraft, Alexander Solzhenitsyn, Julien Gracq, Dostoyevsky, Karl Kraus, Gustav Meyrink, Thomas Mann, Edgar Allan Poe, Jules Verne, Arthur Koestler and Raymond Abellio, who imposed L'Herne on the French literary scene.

In 1966, the publication of his essay La Mort de L.-F. Céline inaugurated the publishing house that he co-founded with Christian Bourgois, named after the latter. Meanwhile, L'Herne added publishing to its activities. At thirty, de Roux became a prominent figure of French literature, omnipresent and rough in his polemics, especially against the Tel Quel group.

After listening to poets and writers of the Beat Generation (especially Claude Pélieu, Allen Ginsberg and Bob Kaufman) and meeting with Gombrowicz, to whom he devoted an essay and a book of interviews, he revealed the possibility to leave Paris. Two traumatic events happened: the censorship of his collection of aphorisms Immédiatement (1971) at the request of Roland Barthes (called a "shepherdess") and Maurice Genevoix (presented as a "writer for field mice") and the takeover of L'Herne by Constantin Tacou in favor of financial maneuvers later in 1973.

Dominique de Roux began a life of wandering and settled briefly in Lisbon and then in Geneva. Under these conditions he started his new magazine Exil and launched a new book series, Dossiers H, published by Éditions L'Âge d'Homme. He published pamphlets and devoted considerable to journalism and television, working as a correspondent in the Portuguese world at the times of implosion and war in its colonies (Guinea-Bissau, Angola, Mozambique).

De Roux networked in the lusophone world, primarily serving the SDECE and because of his adherence to a "political transcendentalism" inspired by reading Raymond Abellio with whom his relations were intensifying at the time. This is embodied in his utopia of a "Gaullist International" and in his idea that Portugal represented the assumption of a universal civilization.

In April 1974, at the time of the Carnation Revolution, de Roux was one of the very few French journalists present at Lisbon, and probably one of the foreigners with the most direct access to General Spínola. He devoted years to assist the Angolan opposition leader Jonas Savimbi to deal with international press and foreign ministries, as well as to conduct guerrilla warfare. This contribution gave impetus to his final works: Le Cinquième Empire published two weeks before his sudden death at age 41, of a heart attack linked to Marfan syndrome, and the posthumous La Jeune fille au ballon rouge et Le Livre nègre.

== Works ==
Novels

- Mademoiselle Anicet, Julliard, 1960; réed. Le Rocher, 1998
- L'Harmonika-Zug, La Table Ronde, 1963; réed. Folio-Gallimard, 1983
- Maison jaune, Bourgois, 1969, 1989
- Le Cinquième empire, Belfond, 1977; réed. Le Rocher, 1997
- La Jeune fille au ballon rouge, Bourgois, 1978; réed. Le Rocher, 2001
- Le Livre nègre, Le Rocher, 1997

Poetry

- Le Gravier des vies perdues, Lettera Amorosa, 1974; reprint Le Temps qu'il fait, 1985

Essays

- La Mort de L.-F. Céline, Petite Vermillon, réed. La Table ronde, 2007
- La Mort de L.-F. Céline, Bourgois, 1966, réed. 1994
- L'Écriture de Charles de Gaulle, Éditions universitaires, 1967; réed. Le Rocher, 1994
- L'Ouverture de la chasse, L'Âge d'homme, 1968; réed. Le Rocher, 2005
- Contre Servan-Schreiber, Balland, 1970
- Gombrowicz, 10/18, 1971; réed. Bourgois, 1996
- Immédiatement, Bourgois, 1972; réed. La Table ronde, 1995 et 2009
- Ne traversez pas le Zambèze, La Proue, 1973
- La France de Jean Yanne, Calmann-Lévy, 1974
- Gamal Abdel Nasser, L'Âge d'homme, 2002
- Il faut partir : Correspondances inédites (1953-1977), Fayard, 2007
