= Immersion suit =

Waterproof suit that protects the wearer from hypothermia from immersion in cold water

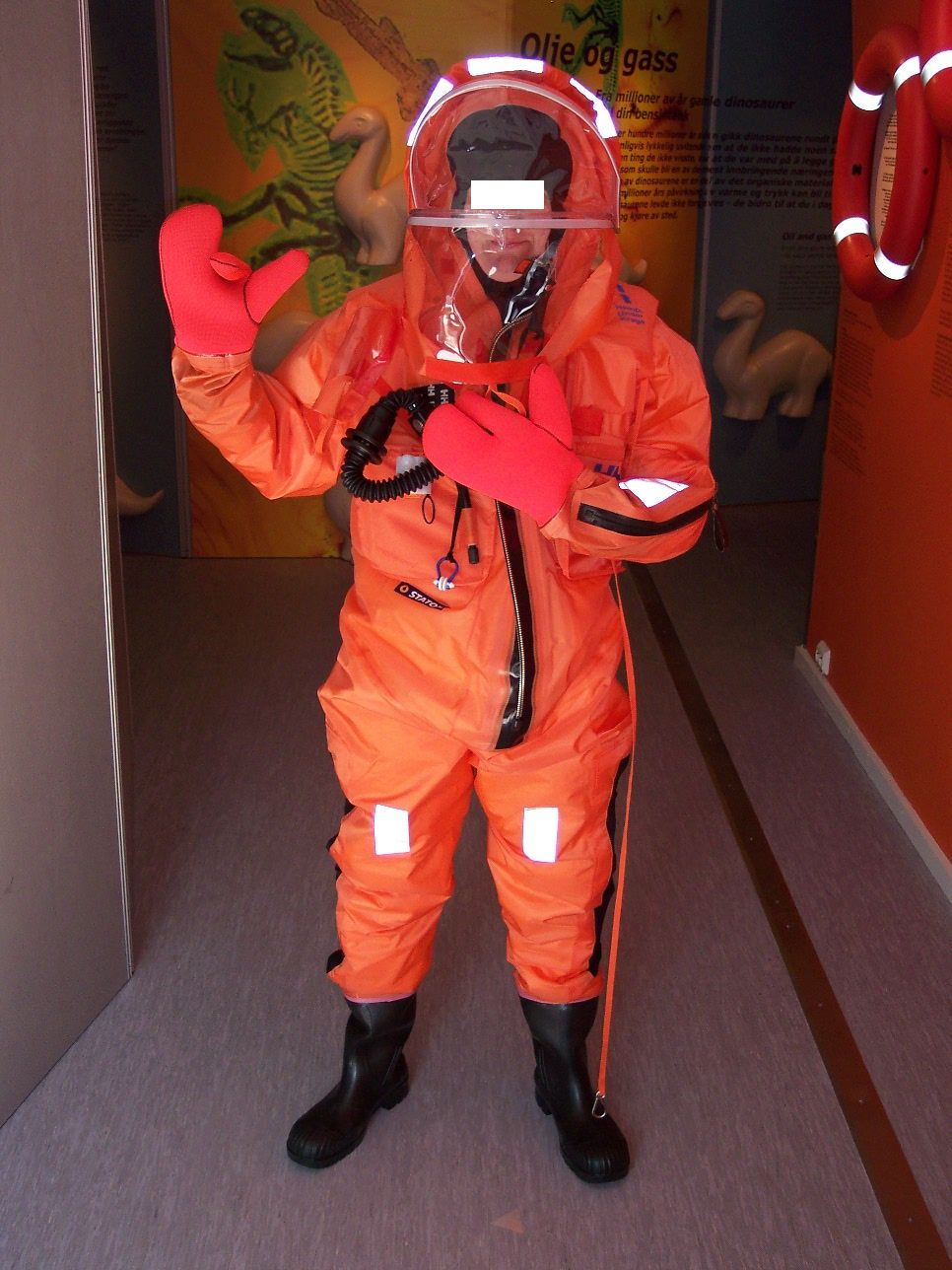
A Statoil survival suit

An immersion suit, also known as a survival suit, is a type of waterproof dry suit intended to protect the wearer from hypothermia if immersed in cold water or otherwise exposed after abandoning a vessel, especially in the open ocean. Immersion suits usually have integral footwear, and a hood, and either built-in gloves or watertight wrist seals.

Several manufacturers also include an inflatable pillow attached high on the back, or an inflatable tube that is attached with zippers at two points on the chest, each side of the main zipper, and circles the back.

Immersion suits are of two types: work suits, worn for long periods in high risk environments, and survival suits, worn during emergencies. In the water, the suits inflate to increase buoyancy and stability, helping the wearer keep the head above water and to keep wind and seas from striking the face. The inflation tube is routed from the inflatable pillow over the left shoulder of the user, and secured in a loop on the chest. Immersion suits with buoyancy aids are provided with buddy lines to allow survivors to connect to one another in the water. Some suits are manufactured with hoisting lanyards that make it easier for vessels with hoists to pull survivors from the water.

== History ==
The first record of a "survival suit" was in 1930 when a New York firm, American Life Suit Corporation, offered merchant and fishing firms what it called a safety suit for crews of ocean vessels. The suit came packed in a small box and was put on like a boilersuit. The precursor of these suits was invented in 1872 by Clark S. Merriman to rescue steamship passengers. It was made from rubber sheeting and became famous by the swim records of Paul Boyton. It was essentially a pair of rubber pants and shirt cinched tight at the waist with a steel band and strap. Within the suit were five air pockets the wearer could inflate by mouth through hoses. Similar to modern dry suits, the suit kept its wearer dry. This essentially allowed wearers to float on their backs, using a double-sided paddle to propel themselves, feet-forward. Additionally, they could attach a small sail to save energy while slowly drifting to shore (because neither emergency radio transmitters nor rescue helicopters had been invented yet). The first immersion suit to gain USCG approval was invented by Gunnar Guddal. Eventually the suit became accepted as essential safety gear.

== Usage ==
=== Work suits ===
This type is worn for long periods while working in circumstances where the risk of exposure is considered to be high. They are made in a variety of standard sizes and chosen to fit the wearer. They are often worn by deep-sea fishermen who work in cold water fishing grounds.

Some of these garments resemble diving drysuits. Others may have many of the features of an immersion suit.

Since humans are warm blooded and sweat to cool themselves, suits that are worn all the time usually have some method for sweat to evaporate and the wearer to remain dry while working.

- Some aircrew dry suits are constructed of a breathable, fire-retardant material that allows water vapor to escape but prevents liquid from entering.
- Some aircraft pilot survival suits use a airtight material such as rubber-backed cotton, which is connected to a forced-air cooling system. Ventilation air is supplied via air hoses inside the cockpit. In an emergency, the hoses can be rapidly disconnected and the ventilation access ports closed on the suit.

=== Survival suits ===
The first 'survival suits' in Europe were invented by Daniel Rigolet, captain of a French oil tanker. Others had experimented on similar suits abroad.

Unlike work suits, "quick don" immersion suits are not normally worn for work, but are stowed in an accessible location on board the craft. The operator may be required to have one immersion suit of the appropriate size on board for each crew member, and other passengers. If an immersion suit is not accessible both from a crew member's work station and berth, then two accessible suits must be provided.

This type of immersion suit's flotation and thermal protection is usually better than an immersion protection work suit, and if the suit is properly maintained, should extend in-water survival for a person who is trained in its use.

An adult immersion suit is often a large bulky one-size-fits-all design meant to fit a wide range of sizes. Two types of materials are used. Neoprene suits, without additional insulation, and suits constructed of a trilaminate waterproof material, with a snap-in insulating liner made from thin foam sheets cut and glued to form the suit, with a rayon backing to make donning the suit easier. These suits typically have oversize booties to accommodate various foot sizes. Gloves may be built into the suit, or be stored in easy access pouches at the end of the sleeves. These suits have a waterproof zipper in front for access. The zippers must be properly maintained or the suit may not seal properly. There is generally a face flap to somewhat seal water out around the neck and protect the wearer from spray. Because of the oversized booties and large mittens, quick don immersion suits are often known as "Gumby suits", after the 1960s-era children's toy.

The integral gloves may be a thin waterproof non-insulated type to give the user greater dexterity during donning and evacuation, with a second insulating outer glove tethered to the sleeves to be worn while immersed.

A ship's captain (or master) may be required to hold drills periodically to ensure that everyone can quickly access the immersion suit storage in an emergency, and don the suit in the allotted amount of time. In the event of an emergency, it should be possible to put on an immersion suit in 60 seconds.

The Submarine Escape Immersion Equipment is a type of survival suit that can be used when escaping from a sunken submarine. The suit is donned before leaving the submarine and then inflated to act as a liferaft when the sailor reaches the surface.

== Construction ==
Survival suits are normally made out of red, fluorescent orange, or yellow fire-retardant neoprene, for high visibility at sea. The neoprene material used is a synthetic rubber closed-cell foam, containing a multitude of tiny air bubbles making the suit sufficiently buoyant to also be a personal flotation device.

The seams of the neoprene suit are sewn and taped to make them waterproof, and the suit has strips of SOLAS specified retroreflective tape on the arms, legs, and head to help locate the wearer at night from a rescue aircraft or ship.

=== Open neck vs closed neck sealing ===
The method of waterproof sealing around the face can affect wearer comfort. Low-cost quick-donning suits typically have an open neck from chest to chin, closed by a waterproof zipper. However, the zipper is stiff and tightly compresses around the face resulting in an uncomfortable fit intended for short-duration use until the wearer can be rescued. The suit material is typically fairly stiff and the wearer is unable to look to the sides easily.

Suits intended for long-term worksuit use, or donned by rescue personnel, typically have a form-fitting neck-seal, with a hood that conforms to the shape of the chin. This design is both more comfortable and allows the wearer to easily turn their head and look up or down. The suit material is designed to be either loose or elastic enough to allow the wearer to pull the top of the suit up over their head and then down around their neck.

== Safety accessories ==
Immersion suits can be equipped with extra safety accessories such as:

- A whistle to signal for help
- An emergency strobe light beacon
- Tethered mittens to better insulate the hands
- A personal locator beacon and automatic identification system man-overboard transponder
- Sea dye markers and floating streamers to increase visibility in water.

== Immersion suit maintenance ==
Each immersion suit needs to be regularly checked and maintained properly in order to be ready for use all the time. The maintenance of the immersion suits kept on board of the vessels must be done according to the rules of the International Maritime Organization (IMO). There are two Guidelines issued by IMO – MSC/Circ.1047 and MSC/Circ.1114 – in relation to immersion suits' maintenance.

== Images ==
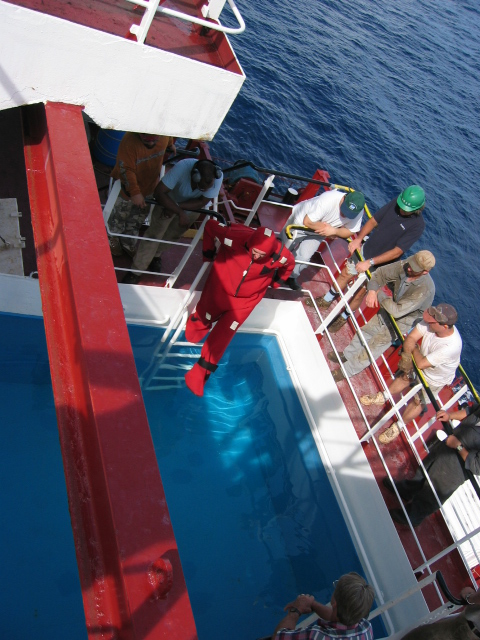
Instructing a crew on use of a survival suit

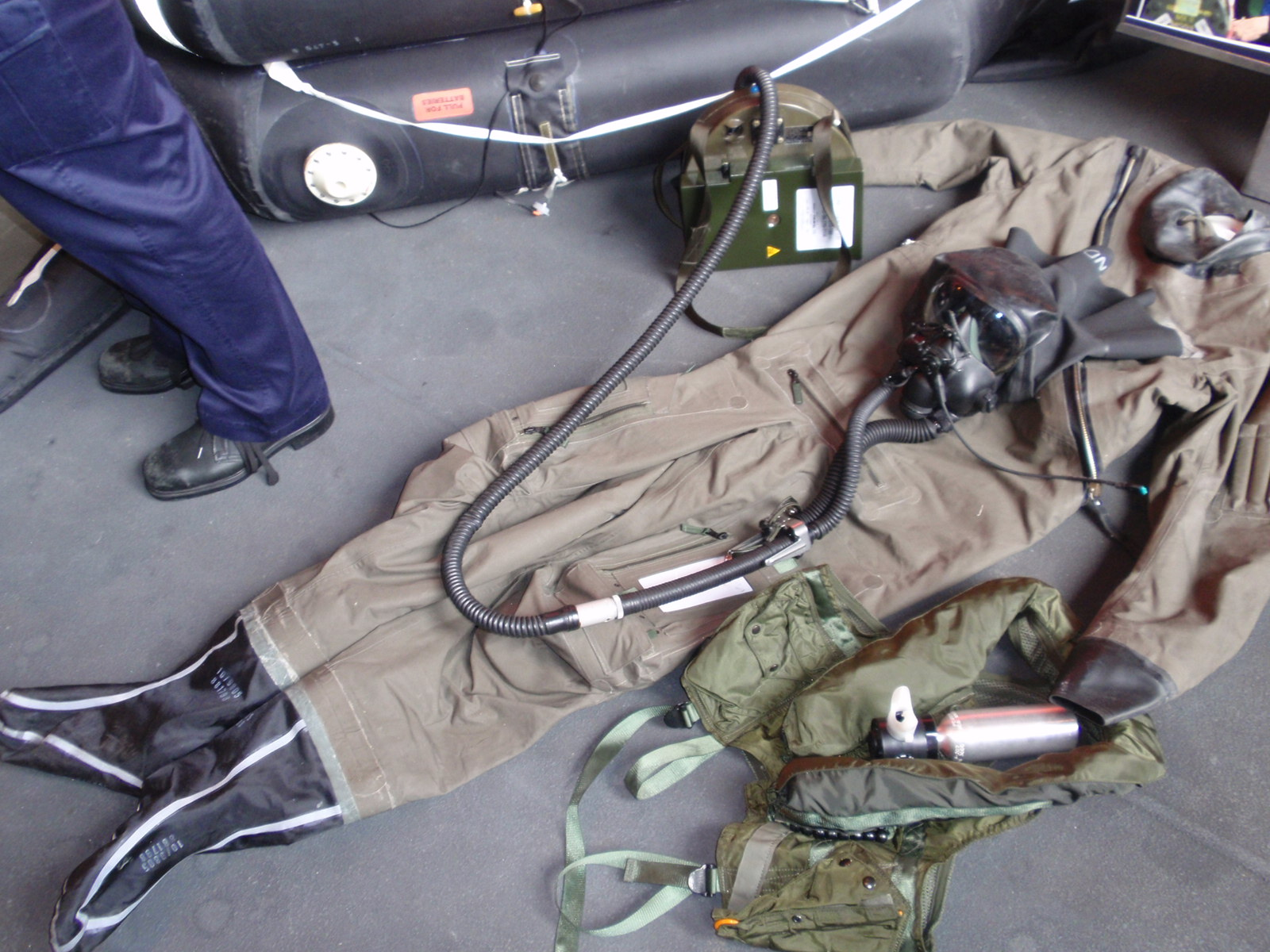
Naval air pilot's immersion suit, with NBC mask with full rubber hood so it can be used as a hazmat suit

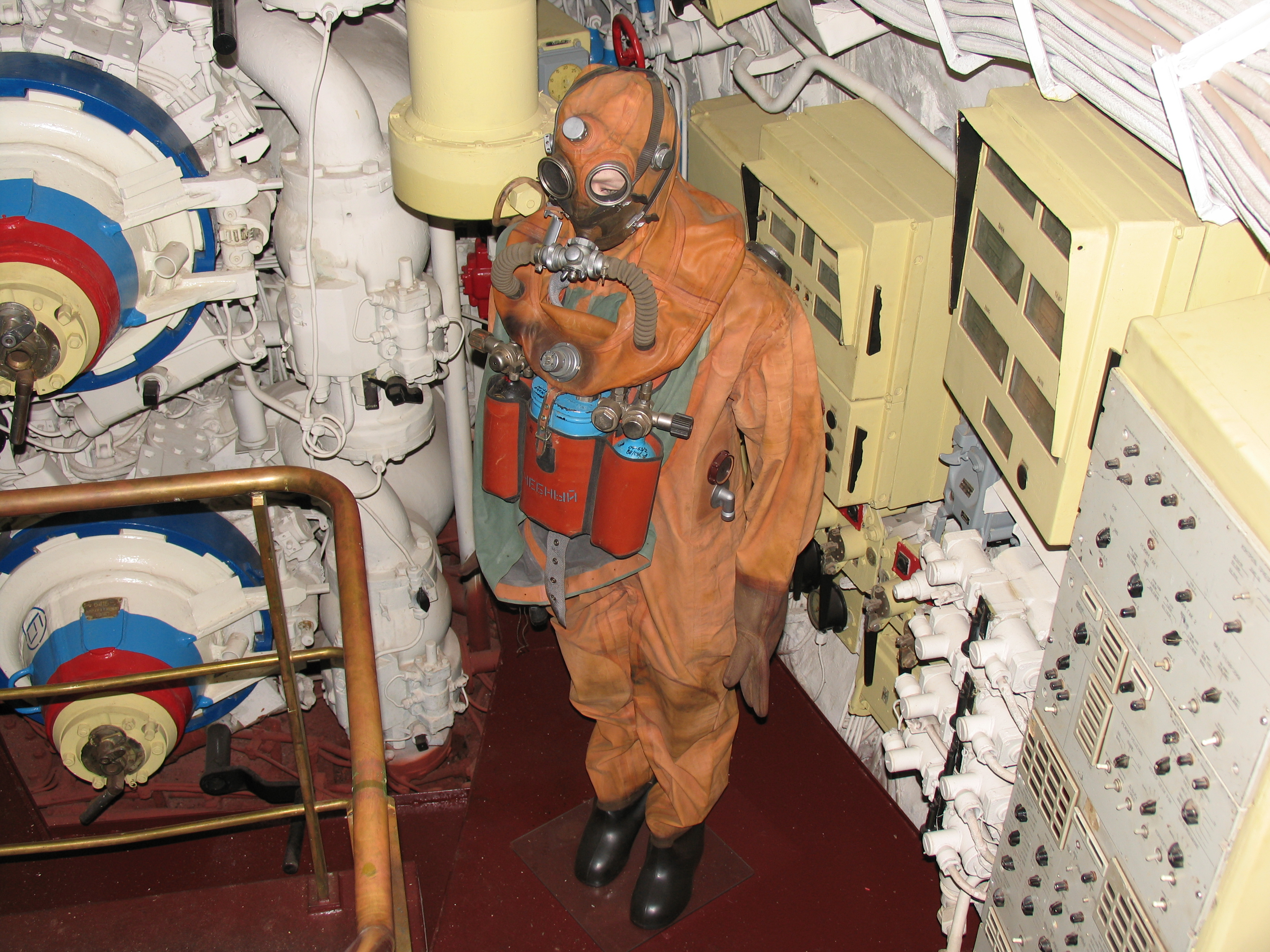
Immersion suit of Russian submarine's crew
