= Diving helmet =

Rigid head enclosure for underwater diving

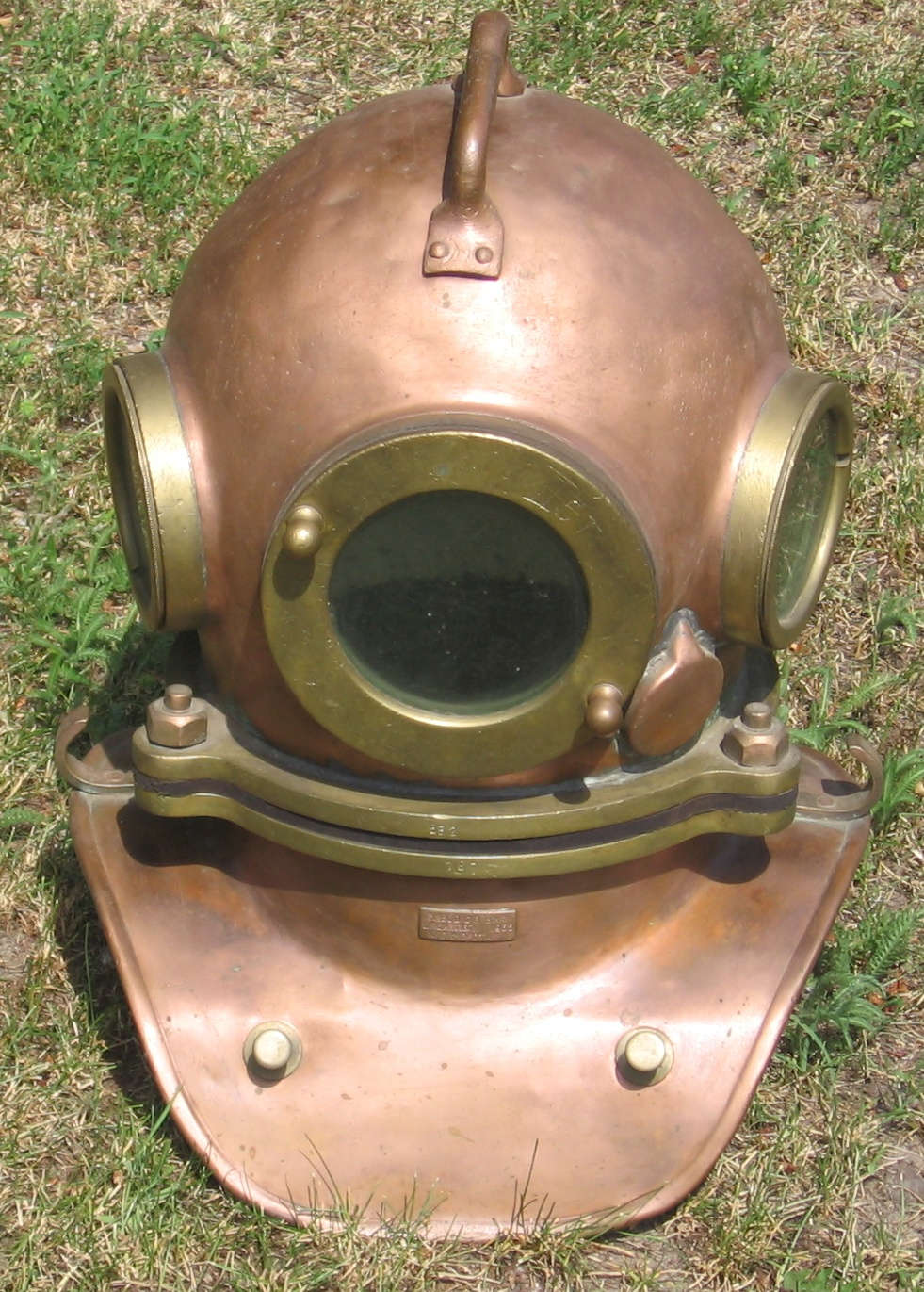
- Copper and brass three bolt Soviet diving helmet.
- Other names: Copper hat; Standard diving helmet; Free flow helmet; Lightweight demand helmet; Reclaim helmet
- Uses: Provision of breathing gas, communications, underwater vision and head protection to underwater divers

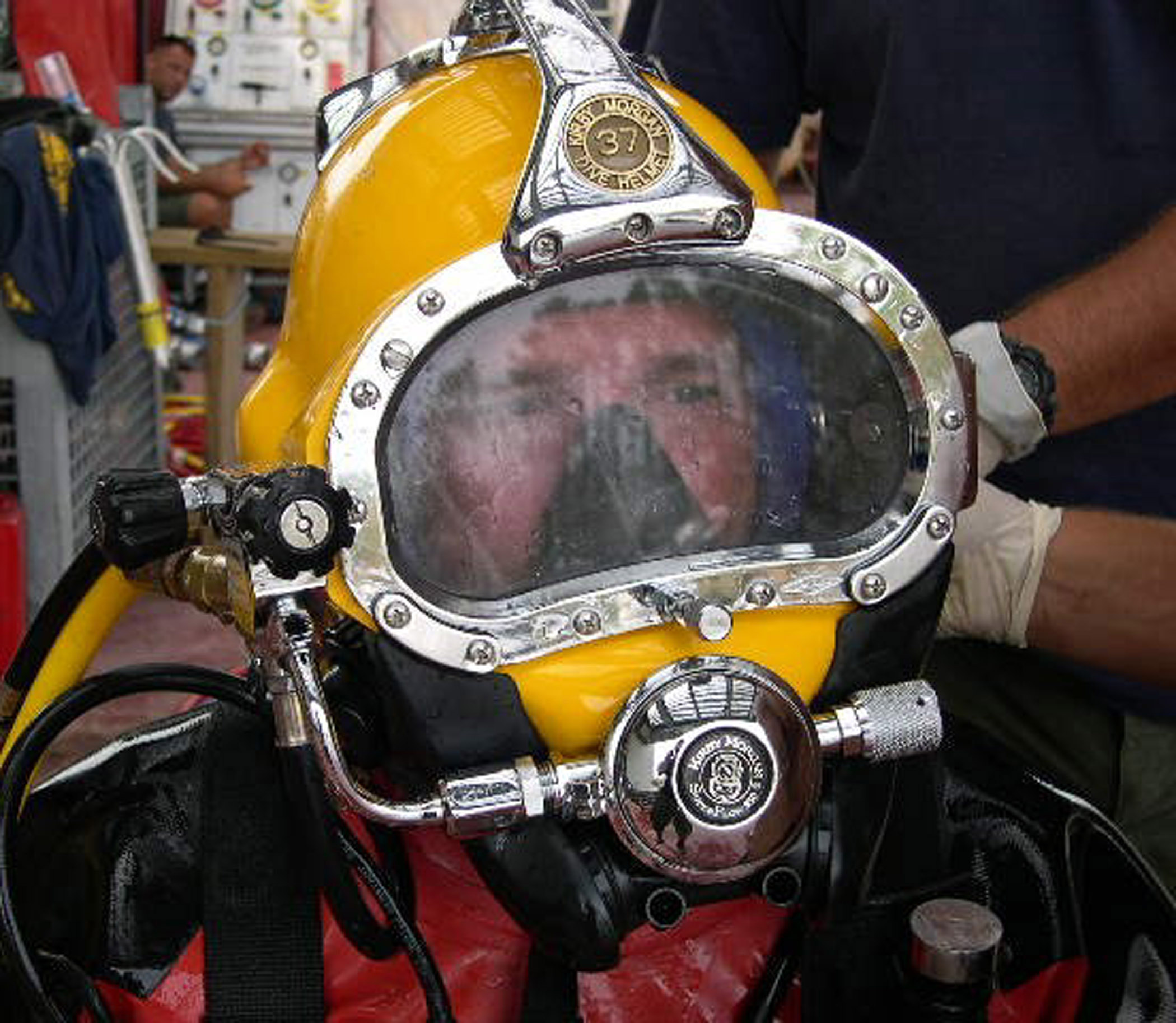
US Navy Diver using Kirby Morgan 37 diving helmet

A diving helmet is a rigid head enclosure with a breathing gas supply used in underwater diving. They are worn mainly by professional divers engaged in surface-supplied diving, though some models can be used with scuba equipment. The upper part of the helmet, known colloquially as the hat or bonnet, may be sealed directly to the diver using a neck dam, connected to a diving suit by a lower part, known as a breastplate, or corselet, depending on regional language preferences, or simply rest on the diver's shoulders, with an open bottom, for shallow water use.

The helmet isolates the diver's head from the water, allows the diver to see clearly underwater, provides the diver with breathing gas, protects the diver's head when doing heavy or dangerous work, and usually provides voice communications with the surface (and possibly other divers). If a helmeted diver becomes unconscious but is still breathing, most helmets will remain in place and continue to deliver breathing gas until the diver can be rescued. In contrast, the scuba regulator used by recreational divers must be held in the mouth by bite grips, and it can fall out of an unconscious diver's mouth and result in drowning.

Before the invention of the demand regulator, all diving helmets used a free-flow design. Gas was delivered at an approximately constant rate, independent of the diver's breathing, and flowed out through an exhaust valve against a slight over-pressure. Most modern helmets incorporate a demand valve so the helmet only delivers breathing gas when the diver inhales. Free-flow helmets use much larger quantities of gas than demand helmets, which can cause logistical difficulties and is very expensive when special breathing gases (such as heliox) are used. They also produce a constant noise inside the helmet, which can cause communication difficulties. Free-flow helmets are still preferred for some applications of hazardous materials diving, because their positive-pressure nature can prevent the ingress of hazardous material in case the integrity of the suit or helmet is compromised. They also remain relatively common in shallow-water air diving, where gas consumption is of little concern, and in nuclear diving because they must be disposed of after some period of use due to irradiation; free-flow helmets are significantly less expensive to purchase and maintain than demand types.

Most modern helmet designs are sealed to the diver's skin at the neck using a neoprene or latex "neck dam" which is independent of the suit, allowing the diver a choice of suits depending on the dive conditions. When divers must work in contaminated environments such as sewage or dangerous chemicals, the helmet (usually of the free-flow type or using a series exhaust valve system) is directly sealed to a dry suit made of a fabric with a smooth vulcanised rubber outer coating to completely isolate and protect the diver. This equipment is the modern equivalent of the historic "standard diving dress".

== Function and structure ==
The usual meaning of diving helmet is a piece of diving equipment that encases the user's head and delivers breathing gas to the diver, but the term "diving helmet", or "cave diving helmet" may also refer to a safety helmet like a climbing helmet or caving helmet that covers the top and back of the head, but is not sealed. These may be worn with a full-face mask or half mask to provide impact protection when diving under an overhead, and may also be used to mount lights and video cameras.

An alternative to the diving helmet that allows communication with the surface is the full-face diving mask. These cover most of the diver's face, specifically including eyes, nose and mouth, and are held onto their head by adjustable straps. Like the diving helmet, the full-face mask is part of the breathing apparatus.

Another style of helmet construction, seldom used, is the clamshell helmet, which uses a front section with a hinged back section, clamped closed, and sealed along the joint. These were seldom satisfactory due to problems with the seal. Prototypes of this type were made by Kirby Morgan and Joe Savoie.

=== Components ===
Basic components and their functions:

- Helmet casing or shell – A rigid watertight structure that encloses the diver's head and supports most of the other components. The part of a standard helmet that encloses the head may also be called the "bonnet" (British English), and the whole unit may be called the "hat" by professional divers. Traditionally made from spun copper, more recently from glass fibre reinforced resin or stainless steel.
- Lower seal – Most deep-water helmets have a means of excluding water from the helmet regardless of the posture of the diver. Shallow water helmets rely on the diver keeping the helmet approximately upright, and the flow of breathing air keeps the water level lower than the diver's nose and mouth, and excess air escapes at the bottom of the helmet.
  - Direct to the dry suit – The helmet may be sealed directly to the neck opening of the dry suit, making the helmet and suit a single watertight unit. The weight of the helmet may be carried by the head and neck, so it must be nearly neutrally buoyant, or can be supported by a breastplate or corselet, in which case it may be negatively buoyant, or positively buoyant and held down by jocking straps.
  - Via a neck dam – The more recent development is for the helmet to clamp to a neck dam, supported by a rigid ring, or clamped to the lower edge of the helmet. The neck dam seals against the skin of the divers neck in the same way that the neck seal of a dry suit works, making the helmet a sealed unit independent of the suit, which may be a dry suit, wet suit or hot-water suit, or even just a pair of overalls in warm water. The weight of the helmet is carried by the head and neck, so it must be nearly neutrally buoyant, and is generally slightly heavy in the water so that it rests on the head and does not have a tendency to float off. When the helmet is buoyant, it is held down by a jocking strap.
  - Breastplate/corselet – An alternative system is for the helmet to seal to a corselet (UK) or breastplate (US), which in turn is sealed to the dry suit. The helmet and suit become a single sealed unit, somewhat more complex than with a direct seal, but easier to put on and take off. The weight of the helmet is carried on the shoulders via the breastplate, so it does not have to be neutrally buoyant, and can be directly weighted or held down by a jocking strap.
- Faceplate (or viewport, in older helmets also called a light) – The diver's window to the world. A transparent window in the front of the helmet or full-face mask. If the helmet is light and carried directly on the head and neck, and can move with the head, it is usually relatively small, and the helmet too is compact and relatively light. If the helmet is supported by the shoulders it cannot turn with the head, and must have a larger volume with a larger viewport or more than one viewport to give an adequate field of vision. A four-light helmet was a common design, with a front port which could be opened when out of the water, two side-lights, to the left and right, and an upper light above the front light to give an upward view.
- Gas supply – The breathing gas supply is connected to the helmet. This is usually a low pressure surface supply hose attached through a non-return valve to a gas block with a bailout gas supply connected to the bailout valve on the gas block, but other systems have been used.
  - Inlet valve or demand valve – The primary gas supply may be free-flow or demand controlled. If it is demand controlled there is usually a free-flow bypass, which may also serve as a defogging system, by blowing air over the inner face of the front viewport.
  - An internal oro-nasal mask is used in demand supplied helmets to minimise dead space. The oro-nasal mask seals around the nose and mouth, forming a small volume gas space through which the breathing gas normally flows from demand valve to nose or mouth, and from nose or mouth to the exhaust valves. There are also one-way valves from the main helmet space into the oro-nasal mask, to allow flow into it while breathing from the free-flow supply, or from a pneumo-hose for emergency supply.
- Gas exhaust system – Exhaled gas is exhausted from the helmet through non-return valves, either directly to the surrounding water, or via a reclaim regulator system through a hose to the surface. There may be two or more sets of non-return valves in series to reduce the risk of back-flow of contaminated water.
- Voice communications microphone and headphone speakers connected to the surface via copper conductors in the umbilical cable.
- Nose blocker, also known as a valsalva device – A device is provided which the diver can use to block the nose for ear equalising maneuvers.
- Other accessories may be present, such as a lifting handle, ballast weights, light and video camera brackets, a welding visor, spitcock and internal padding.
  - A lifting handle allows the attendant to lift the helmet with one hand, without it swinging or tilting excessively.
  - Ballast weights provide neutral or slightly negative buoyancy, and place the centre of gravity where it will not cause off-centre loads on the diver's neck.
  - Brackets allow easy mounting of lights and video cameras so that the diver can see in dark conditions, and the supervisor can see what the diver is doing.
  - A welding visor is fitted on a hinge to protect the diver from bright light and ultraviolet light produced by welding arcs or cutting flames. It is flipped down over the faceplate for use when needed. Most welding visors are heavily tinted glass, and must be manually flipped down for use, but electronically controlled auto-darkening visors are also available.
  - A spitcock was provided on some standard helmets to allow the diver to suck in a mouthful of water which would then be spat onto the inner surface of a viewport to wash off condensation fogging. The water would then usually be trapped between the outside of the suit and the inside of the breastplate. The spitcock could also be opened as an auxiliary exhaust port when the diver was working in some non-upright positions.
  - Internal padding is fitted to lightweight helmets to cushion the diver's head against shock loads, to support the helmet more comfortably and so that it will closely follow the head movement. A chin strap can be used to help with these functions. A close-fitting insulated cap may be provided for warmth.
  - A jocking strap or jocking harness can be used to transfer excess buoyancy forces of the helmet to the diver's weighting system, or part of the weighting system can be directly attached to the helmet.
  - Part of the water used to heat a hot water suit can be routed through a water jacket (shroud) around part of the breathing gas supply tubing on the helmet, typically the metal tube between the bailout valve block and the demand valve inlet to heat the gas just before delivery through the demand valve. As a large part of body heat loss is in heating the inspired air to body temperature on every breath, this can reduce heat loss significantly on deep dives in cold water.
- A yoke, or locking collar is a component that folds under the bottom opening of a lightweight helmet making the opening smaller than the head, and when locked in place, prevents the helmet from lifting off the diver's head.

== History ==
=== Deane brothers ===
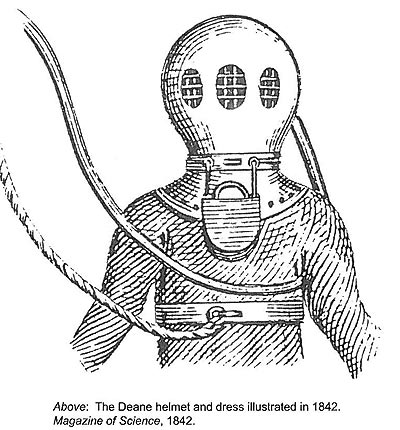
1842 sketch of the Deane brothers' diving helmet, the first surface-supplied diving dress equipment in the world.

The first successful diving helmets were produced by the brothers Charles and John Deane in the 1820s. Inspired by a fire accident he witnessed in a stable in England, he designed and patented a "Smoke Helmet" to be used by firemen in smoke-filled areas in 1823. The apparatus comprised a copper helmet with an attached flexible collar and garment. A long leather hose attached to the rear of the helmet was to be used to supply air - the original concept being that it would be pumped using a double bellows. A short pipe allowed air to escape, as more was pumped in. The user breathed from the airflow as it passed the face. The garment was made of leather or airtight cloth, secured by straps.

The brothers lacked money to build the equipment themselves, so they sold the patent to their employer, Edward Barnard. In 1827, the first smoke helmets were built, by German-born British engineer Augustus Siebe. In 1828 the brothers decided to find another application for their device and converted it into a diving helmet. They marketed the helmet with a loosely attached "diving suit" so that a diver could perform salvage work, but only in a mainly vertical position (otherwise water entered the suit).

In 1829 the Deane brothers sailed from Whitstable for trials of their new underwater apparatus, establishing the diving industry in the town. In 1834 Charles used his diving helmet and suit in a successful attempt on the wreck of Royal George at Spithead, during which he recovered 28 of the ship's cannons. In 1836, John Deane recovered timbers, guns, longbows, and other items from the Mary Rose shipwreck.

By 1836 the Deane brothers had produced the world's first diving manual, Method of Using Deane's Patent Diving Apparatus, which explained in detail the workings of the apparatus and pump, and safety precautions.

=== The Siebe helmet ===
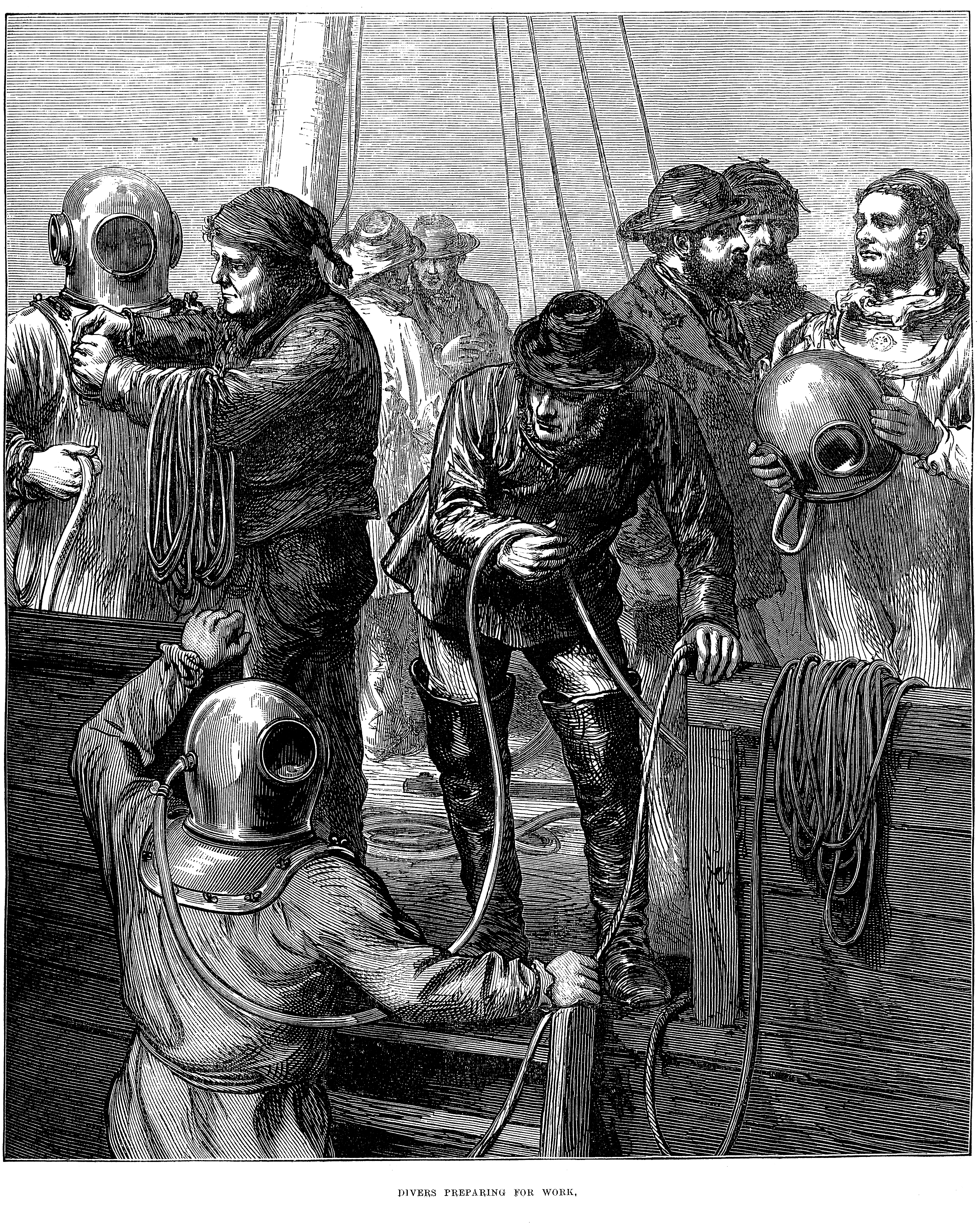
Siebe's improved design in 1873.

In the 1830s the Deane brothers asked Siebe to apply his skill to improve their underwater helmet design. Expanding on improvements already made by another engineer, George Edwards, Siebe produced his own design; a helmet fitted to a full length watertight canvas diving suit. The equipment included an exhaust valve in the helmet, which allowed excess air to escape without allowing water to flow in. The closed diving suit, connected to an air pump on the surface, became the first effective standard diving dress, and the prototype of hard-hat rigs still in use today.

Siebe introduced various modifications on his diving dress design to accommodate the requirements of the salvage team on the wreck of HMS Royal George, including making the helmet detachable from the corselet; his improved design gave rise to the typical standard diving dress which revolutionised underwater civil engineering, underwater salvage, commercial diving and naval diving.

=== Lightweight helmets ===
Commercial diver and inventor Joe Savoie is credited with inventing the helmet neck dam in the 1960s, which made possible a new era of lightweight helmets, including the Kirby Morgan Superlite series (an adaption of Morgan's existing "Band Mask" into a full helmet.) Savoie did not patent this invention, though he did hold patents on other diving equipment, which allowed widespread development of the concept by other manufacturers. The neck dam seals the helmet around the diver's neck in the same way that a dry suit neck seal works, using similar materials. This allows the helmet to be carried on the head and not supported by the shoulders on a corselet (breastplate), so the helmet can turn with the head and can therefore be a much closer fit, which considerably reduces the volume, and as the helmet must be ballasted for neutral buoyancy, the overall weight is reduced. Neck dams were already in use on space suits in Project Mercury, and neck seals had been used on dry suits even longer, but Savoie was the first to use the technology to seal the underside of a diving helmet.

== Types ==
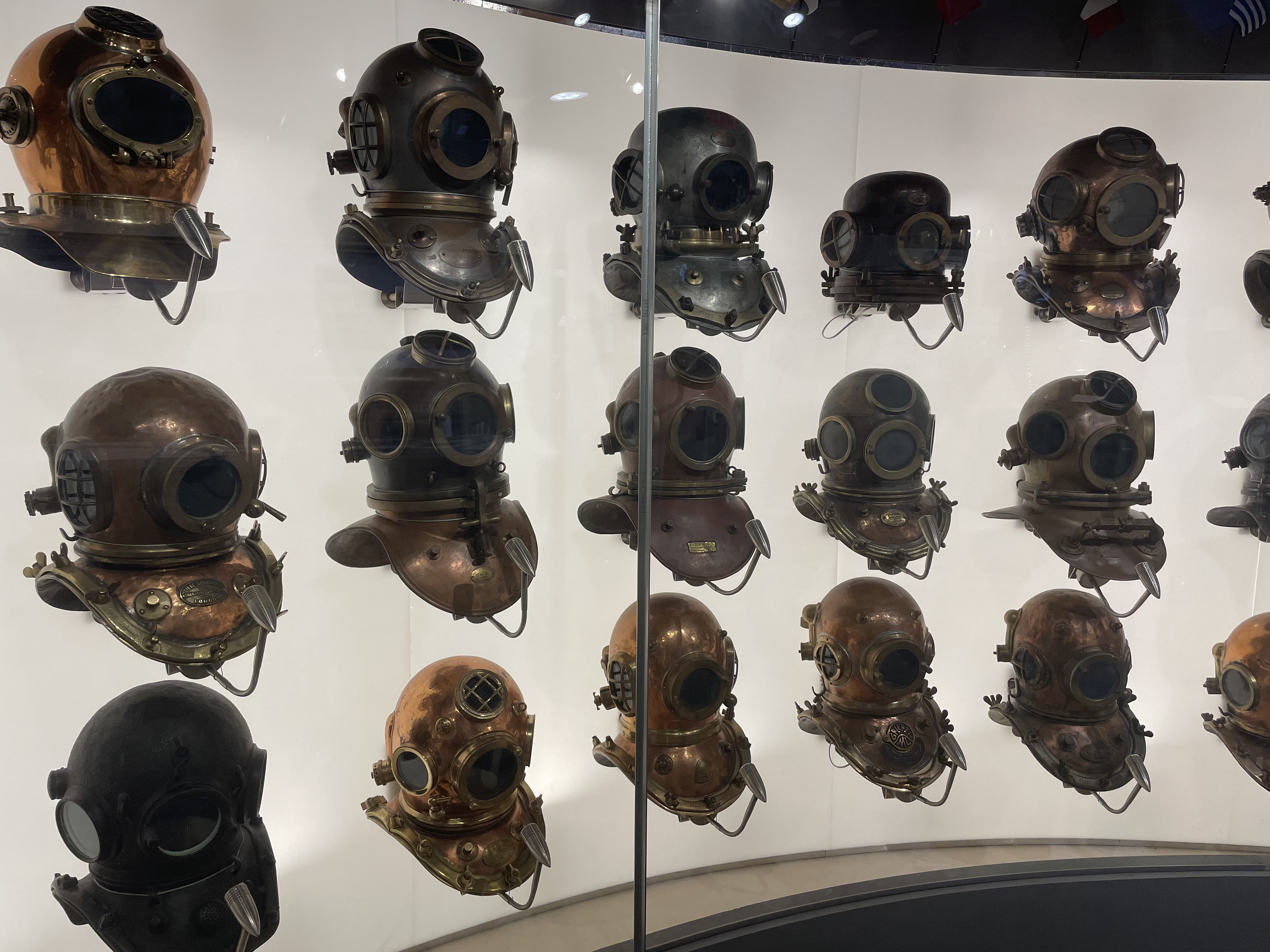
Display of diving helmets from several countries

Diving helmet types may be distinguished by several characteristics. They may be open to the water at the bottom, sealed to the suit, or sealed to the diver by a neck dam. They may provide a constant flow of gas, from which the diver breathes as it passes, or supply gas only on demand, they may have neutral buoyancy, or be held in place by straps or ballast weights, and they may vent all the gas after a single pass, or recirculate it for reduced consumption. In many cases they may be switched between modes during a dive. Demand helmets usually have a valve to provide free-flow, and closed or semi-closed circuit systems can often be switched to open circuit.

=== Standard diving helmets (Copper hats) ===
The original standard diving equipment was a copper helmet or "bonnet" (British English) clamped onto a copper breastplate or "corselet", which transferred the weight to the diver's shoulders. This assembly was clamped to a rubber gasket on the dry suit to make a watertight seal. Breathing air and later sometimes helium based gas mixtures were pumped through a hose to a non-return inlet valve on the helmet or breastplate, and released to the surroundings through an exhaust valve.

Historically, deep sea diving helmets were described by the number of bolts used to clamp them to the rubber gasket of the diving suit, and where applicable, the number of bolts used to secure the bonnet (helmet) to the corselet (breastplate). This ranged from the no bolt, two, three, and four bolt helmets; corselets with six, eight, or 12 bolts; and Two-Three, Twelve-Four, and Twelve-Six bolt helmets. For example, the US twelve-four helmets used 12 bolts to clamp the breastplate to the suit, and four bolts to seal the helmet to the breastplate. The no-bolt helmet used a spring-loaded clamp to secure the helmet to corselet over the suit gasket, and many helmets were sealed to the breastplate by a 1/8 turn interrupted screw thread. Swedish helmets were distinctive for using a neck ring instead of a corselet, a precursor of more modern diving equipment, but cumbersome and uncomfortable for the diver. A further distinction is the number of viewports, or "lights", usually one, three or four. The front light could be opened for air and communications when the diver was out of the water. This equipment is commonly referred to as Standard diving dress and "heavy gear."

Occasionally, divers would lose consciousness while working at 120 feet in standard helmets. The English physiologist J.S. Haldane found by experiment that this was partly due to a buildup of carbon dioxide in the helmet caused by insufficient ventilation and a large dead space, and established a minimum flow rate of 1.5 cubic feet (42 L) per minute at ambient pressure.

==== Gas extender helmets ====
A small number of copper Heliox helmets were made by the US Navy for the Second World War. These helmets were Mk Vs modified by the addition of a bulky brass carbon dioxide scrubber chamber at the rear, and are easily distinguished from the standard model. The Mk V Helium weighs about 93 lb (42 kg) complete (bonnet, scrubber canister and corselet) These helmets and similar models manufactured by Kirby Morgan, Yokohama Diving Apparatus Company and DESCO used the scrubber as a gas extender, a form of semi-closed rebreather system, where breathing gas was recirculated through the scrubber by entraining the helmet gas in the flow from an injector supplying fresh gas, a system pioneered by Dräger in 1912.

==== Semi-closed rebreather helmets ====
In 1912 the German firm Drägerwerk of Lübeck introduced a version of standard diving dress using a gas supply from an oxygen rebreather and no surface supply. The system used a copper diving helmet and standard heavy diving suit with a back-mounted set of cylinders and scrubber. The breathing gas was circulated by using an injector system in the loop powered by the added gas. This was developed further with the Modell 1915 "Bubikopf" helmet and the DM20 oxygen rebreather system for depths up to 20 m, and the DM40 mixed gas rebreather which used an oxygen cylinder and an air cylinder for the gas supply, producing a nitrox mixture, for depths up to 40 m.

The Siebe Gorman Mine Recovery Type Self-Contained Diving Apparatus (MRS) was a diving suit based on a two-light copper helmet, with the corselet glued to the top part of a diving suit which had rubber seals round the waist of the jacket and trouser sections. The system used a nitrox mixture with 45% oxygen which was partly recirculated and scrubbed of carbon dioxide, and could be used to depths of up to 40 m. Maximum endurance wast 60 to 90 minutes depending on depth. The front viewport was oval with a hinge at the bottom. The exhaust port on the right side was unusual in appearance, with a circular perforated plate cover. The gas extender unit with scrubber was back mounted, with three small cylinders, and circulated gas to the helmet through corrugated hoses attached behind the ears.

=== Shallow-water helmets ===
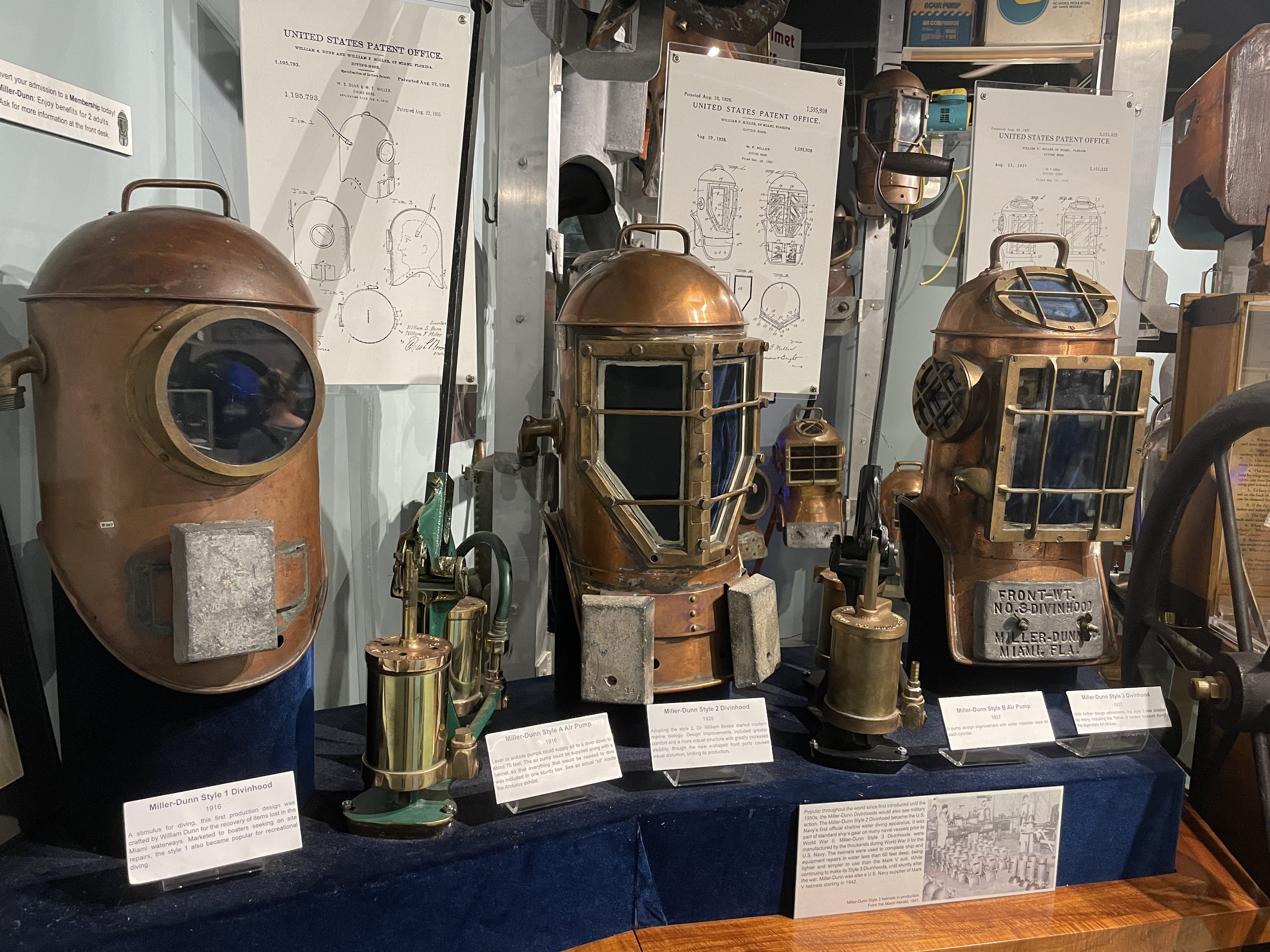
Three models of Miller Dunn Divinhood shallow water diving helmets

The shallow water helmet is a very simple concept: a helmet with viewports which is fitted by lowering over the diver's head to rest on the shoulders. It must be slightly negatively buoyant when filled with air so that it does not float off the diver in use. Air is supplied through a low pressure hose and escapes at the bottom of the helmet, which is not sealed to the suit, and can be lifted off by the diver in an emergency. The helmet will flood if the diver leans over or falls over. The shallow water helmet generally has a handle on top to help the tender lift it onto and off the diver when out of the water. The structure is variable, and ranges from relatively heavy metal castings to lighter sheet metal shells with additional ballast.

The concept has been used for recreational diving as a breathing system for use by untrained tourists in the direct care of a dive leader in a benign diving environment, marketed as the Sea Trek diving system.

=== Lightweight demand helmets ===
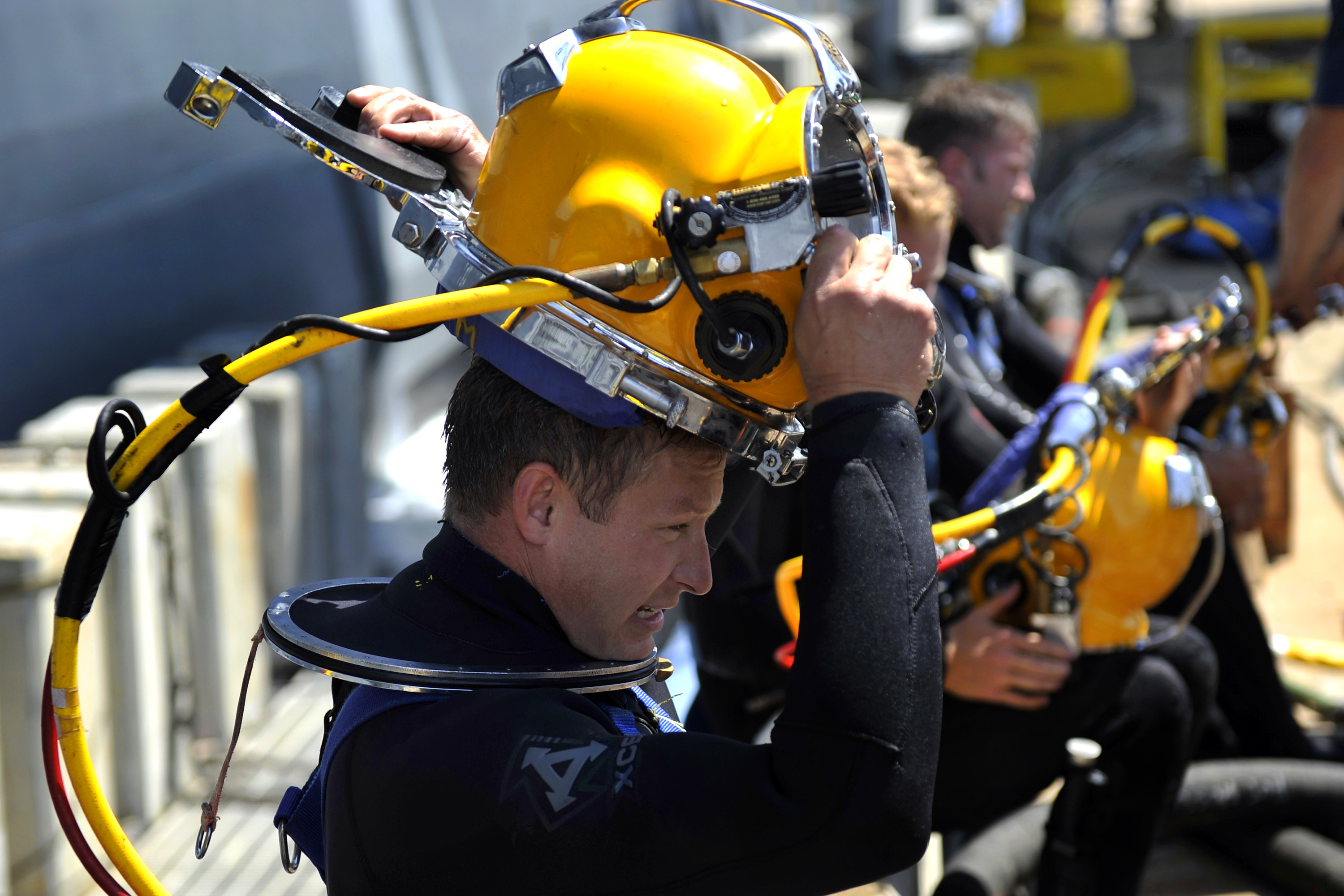
Surface supplied lightweight open circuit demand helmet

The lightweight diving helmet is a type which is fitted more closely to the diver's head, reducing the interior volume, and thereby reducing the displaced volume of the helmet, so less mass is required to make the helmet's buoyancy neutral. The consequence is a reduced overall mass for the equipment carried by the diver, who must not be buoyant in the water. This reduction in volume and mass allows the diver to more safely support the helmet on the head and neck when out of the water, so when it is immersed and neutrally buoyant, it is comfortable to move around with the head, allowing the diver to use neck movement to change the direction of view, which in turn increases the diver's total field of vision while working. Since the lightweight helmet can be supported by the head and neck, it can be sealed to the neck, using a neck dam, independent of the diving suit, making operations equally convenient with dry suits and wetsuits, including hot water suits. Some models can be sealed directly to a dry suit for maximum isolation from the environment.

The foam neoprene or latex neck dam of many of the popular Kirby-Morgan helmets is fitted to an oval metal neck ring which hooks onto the bottom of the helmet in front. A folding locking collar at the back of the helmet swings forward and up to push the back of the neck ring up into the base of the helmet, and also prevents the helmet from lifting off the head by partly occluding the neck ring opening at the back. The locking collar is secured in the locked position by two spring loaded pull-pin latches. The helmet seals over the neck ring with a barrel seal O-ring. Other arrangements may be used with similar effect on other models, such as the KMSL 17B, where the seal is made on the outside of the helmet to an O-ring seated in a groove in the fibreglass rim. A lever operated clamp with a yoke is mounted on the neck dam and seals to the helmet rim, or a moulded rubber seal bonded to a dry suit is clamped to the helmet using a similar clamp system.

==== Open circuit demand helmets ====
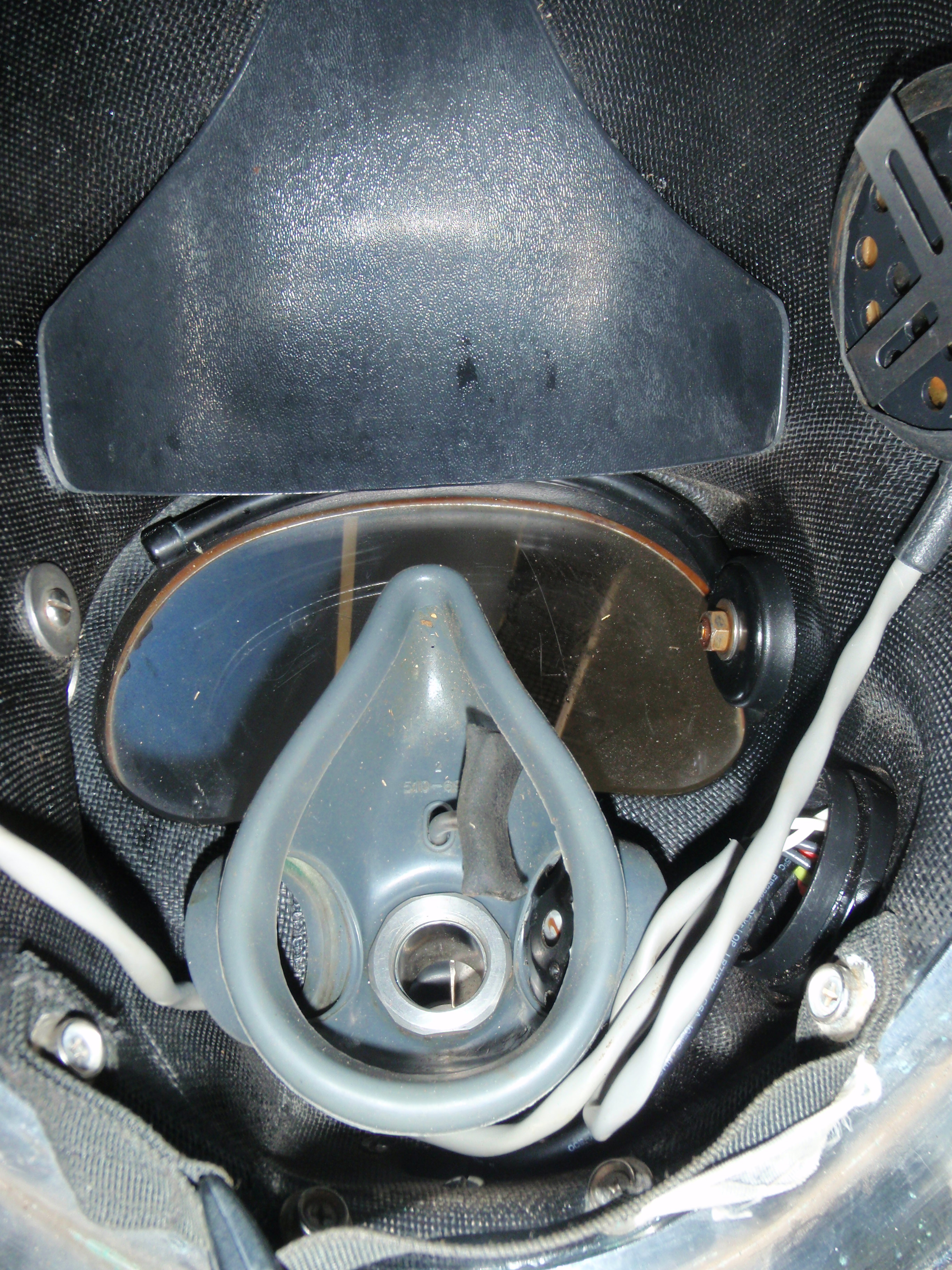
Inside view of a Kirby Morgan 37 showing the oral-nasal mask, the microphone and a loudspeaker of the communications system

Notable modern commercial helmets include the Kirby Morgan Superlite-17 from 1975 and developments from that model. These helmets are of the demand type, usually built on a fiberglass shell with chrome-plated brass fittings, and are considered the standard in modern commercial diving for most operations.

Kirby Morgan dominates the new helmet market, but there have been other manufacturers including Savoie, Miller, Gorski, Composite-Beat Engel,Divex, and Advanced Diving Equipment Company. Many of these are still in use; a new helmet represents an investment of several thousand dollars, and most divers purchase their own or rent one from their employer.

==== Reclaim helmets ====
Reclaim helmets use a surface supply system to provide breathing gas to the diver in the same way as in the open circuit helmets, but also have a return system to reclaim and recycle the exhaled gas to save the expensive helium diluent, which would be discharged to the surrounding water and lost in an open circuit system. The reclaimed gas is discharged from the helmet through a back-pressure regulator and returned to the surface through a hose in the umbilical which is provided for this purpose, passed through a scrubber to remove carbon dioxide, blended with oxygen to the required mix and repressurised for immediate re-use or stored for later use.

In order to allow the exhaust gas to be discharged from the helmet safely, it must pass through an exhaust back-pressure regulator, which works on the same principle to a built-in breathing system exhaust valve, activated by the pressure difference between the interior of the helmet and the ambient pressure. The reclaim exhaust valve may be a two-stage valve for lower resistance, and will generally have a manual bypass valve which allows exhaust to the ambient water. The helmet will have an emergency flood valve to prevent possible exhaust regulator failure from causing a helmet squeeze before the diver can bypass it manually.

=== Free-flow helmets ===
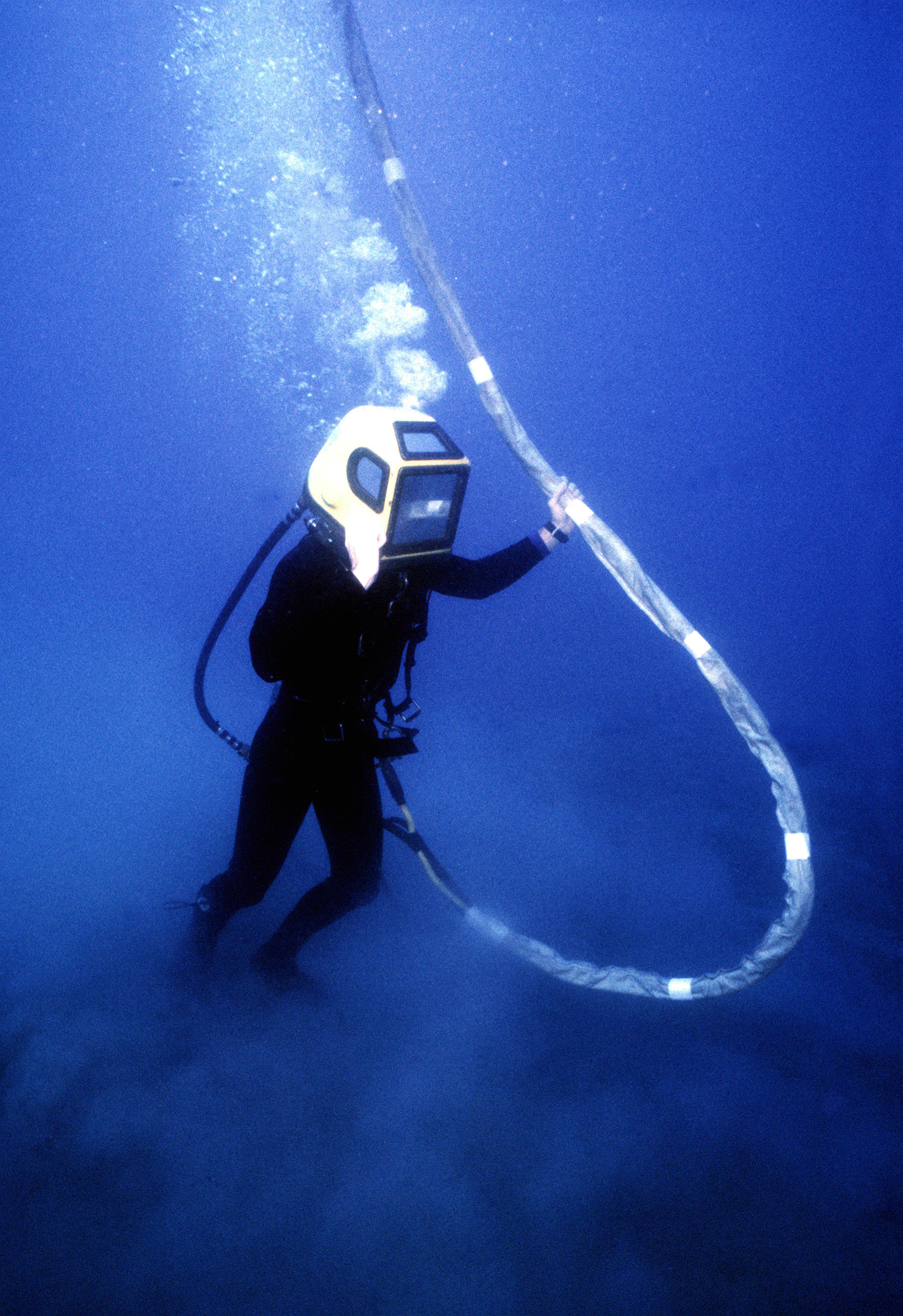
US Navy Mark 12 free flow diving helmet

In a free-flow or constant flow helmet, gas is delivered at an approximately constant rate, set by the panel operator, and usually adjustable by the diver, independent of the diver's breathing, and flows out through an exhaust valve against a slight adjustable over-pressure. Free-flow helmets use much larger quantities of gas than demand helmets, which can cause logistical difficulties and is very expensive when special breathing gases (such as heliox) are used. They also produce a constant noise inside the helmet, which can cause communication difficulties. Free-flow helmets are still preferred for some applications of hazardous materials diving, because their positive-pressure nature can prevent the ingress of hazardous material in case the integrity of the suit or helmet is compromised. They also remain relatively common in shallow-water air diving, where gas consumption is of little concern, and in nuclear diving because they must be disposed of after some period of use due to irradiation; free-flow helmets are significantly less expensive to purchase and maintain than demand types due to simple construction and fewer components.

The DESCO "air hat" is a metal free-flow helmet, designed in 1968 and still in production. Although it has been updated several times, the basic design has remained constant and all upgrades can be retrofitted to older helmets. Its robust and simple design (it can be completely disassembled in the field with only a screwdriver and wrench) makes it popular for shallow-water operations and hazardous materials diving. The helmet is secured to the diving suit by a neck ring, and held in place on the diver against buoyancy by means of a "jocking strap" which runs between the legs. Buoyancy can be fine-tuned by adjusting intake and exhaust valves to control the internal pressure, which will control the volume of gas in the attached dry suit. Concept and operation are very similar to the standard diving helmet. Noise level can be high and can interfere with communications and affect diver hearing.

The US Navy replaced the Mark V helmet in 1980 with the Morse Engineering Mark 12 deep water helmet which has a fibreglass shell with a distinctive large rectangular front faceplate for a better field of vision for work. It also has side and top viewports for peripheral vision. This helmet can also be used for mixed gas either for open circuit or as part of a modular semi-closed circuit system, which uses a back mounted recirculating scrubber unit connected to the lower back of the helmet by flexible breathing hoses. The helmet uses a neck dam or can be connected directly to a dry suit, and uses a jocking harness to keep the helmet in position, but is ballasted to provide neutral buoyancy and a centre of gravity at the centre of buoyancy for stability. Airflow is directed over the faceplate to prevent fogging. Both the Mk V and the Mk 12 were in use in 1981. The noise level in the Mk 12 in open circuit mode can have adverse effects on diver hearing. Sound intensity levels have been measured at 97.3 dB(A) at 30.5 msw depth. The Mk 12 was phased out in 1993.

Light-weight transparent dome type helmets have also been used. For example, the Sea Trek surface supplied system, developed in 1998 by Sub Sea Systems, is used for recreational diving. Also the Lama, a near spherical acrylic dome helmet developed by Yves Le Masson in the 1970s, has been used in television to let viewers see the face and hear the voice of the presenter speaking underwater, and was also used with the Lockout Breathing System, a back mounted umbilical supplied rebreather system rated to 300msw, and used in the North Sea.

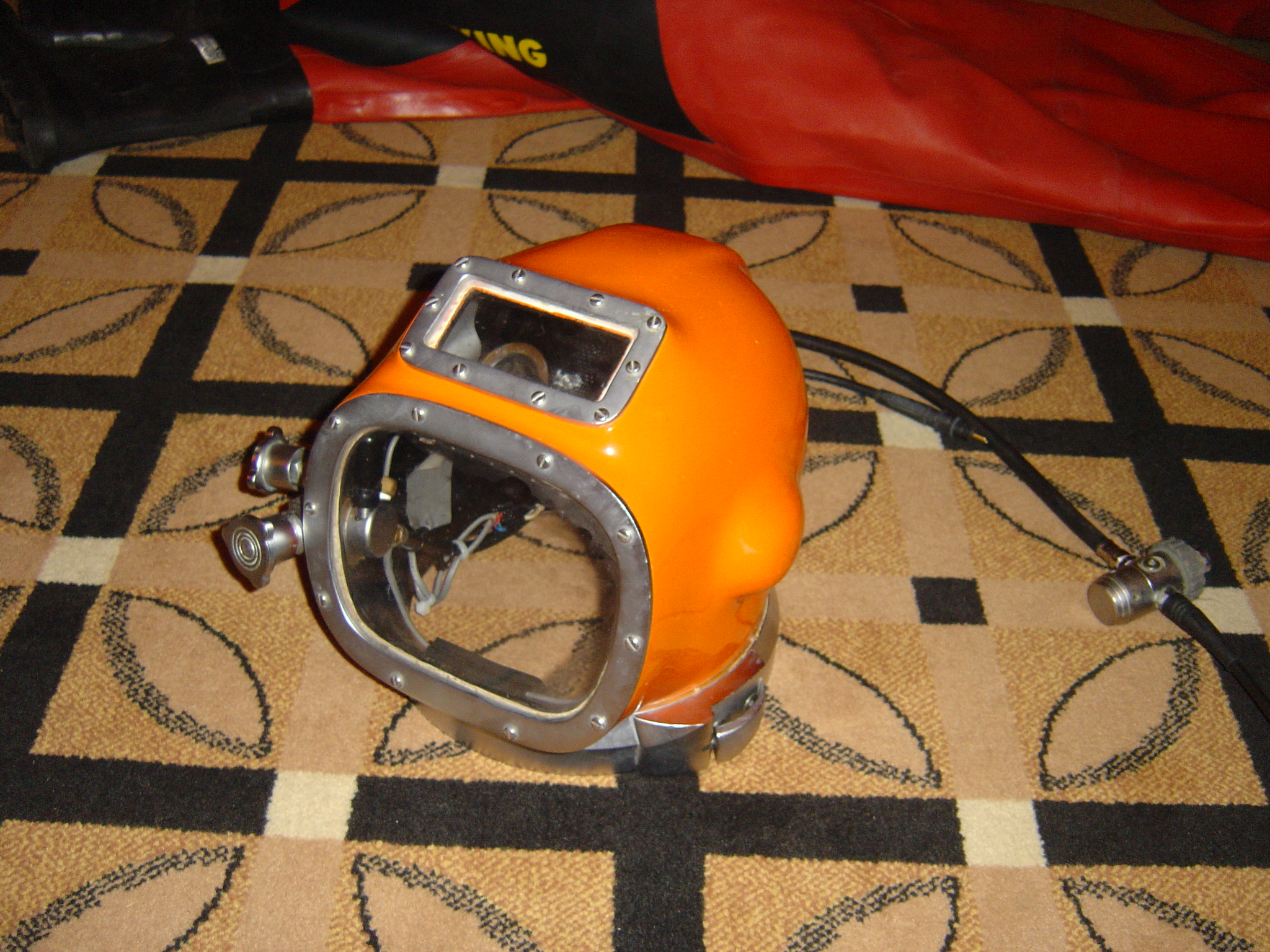
Front view of an AH3 free flow diving helmet

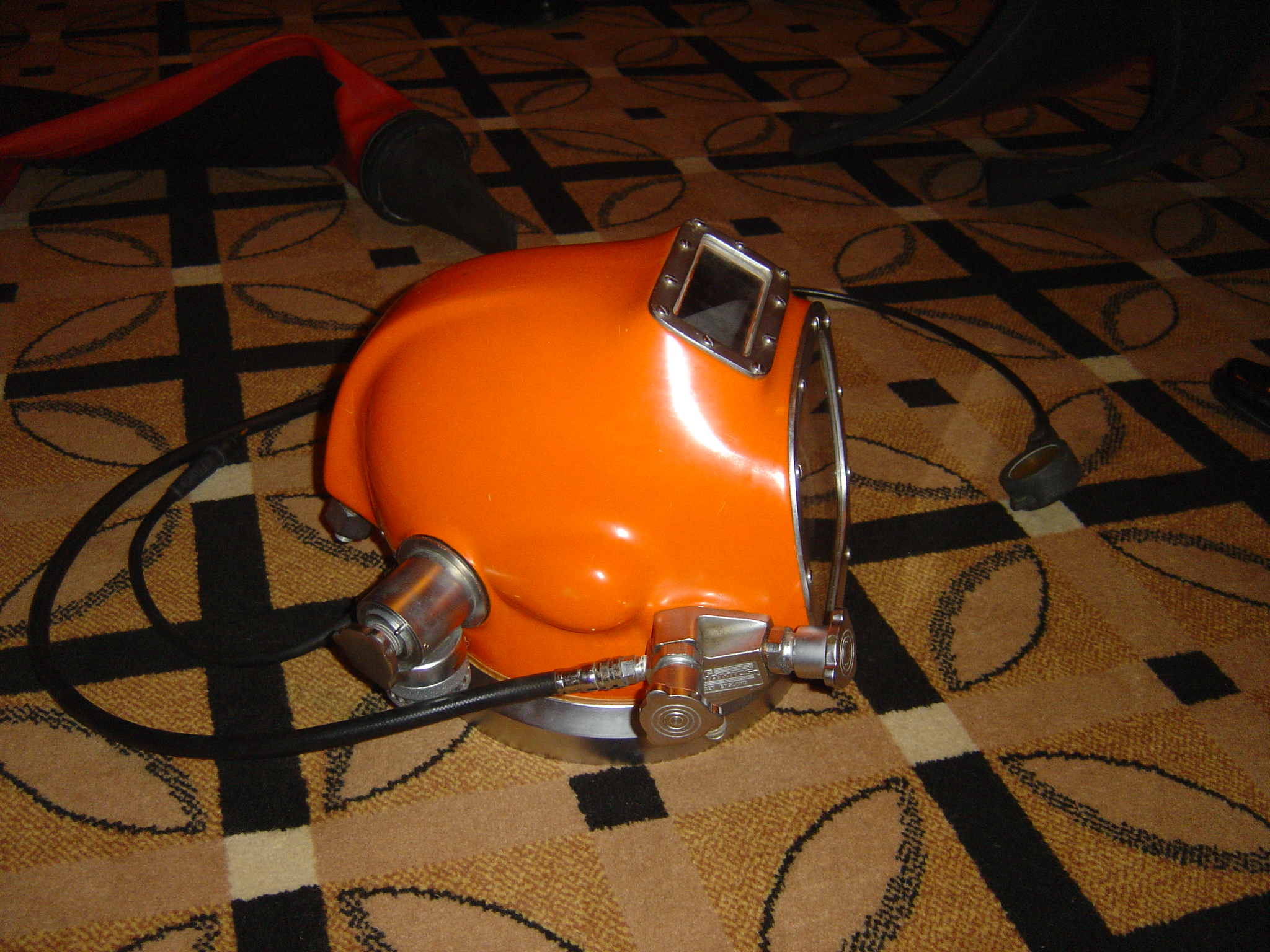
Side view of an AH3 free flow diving helmet

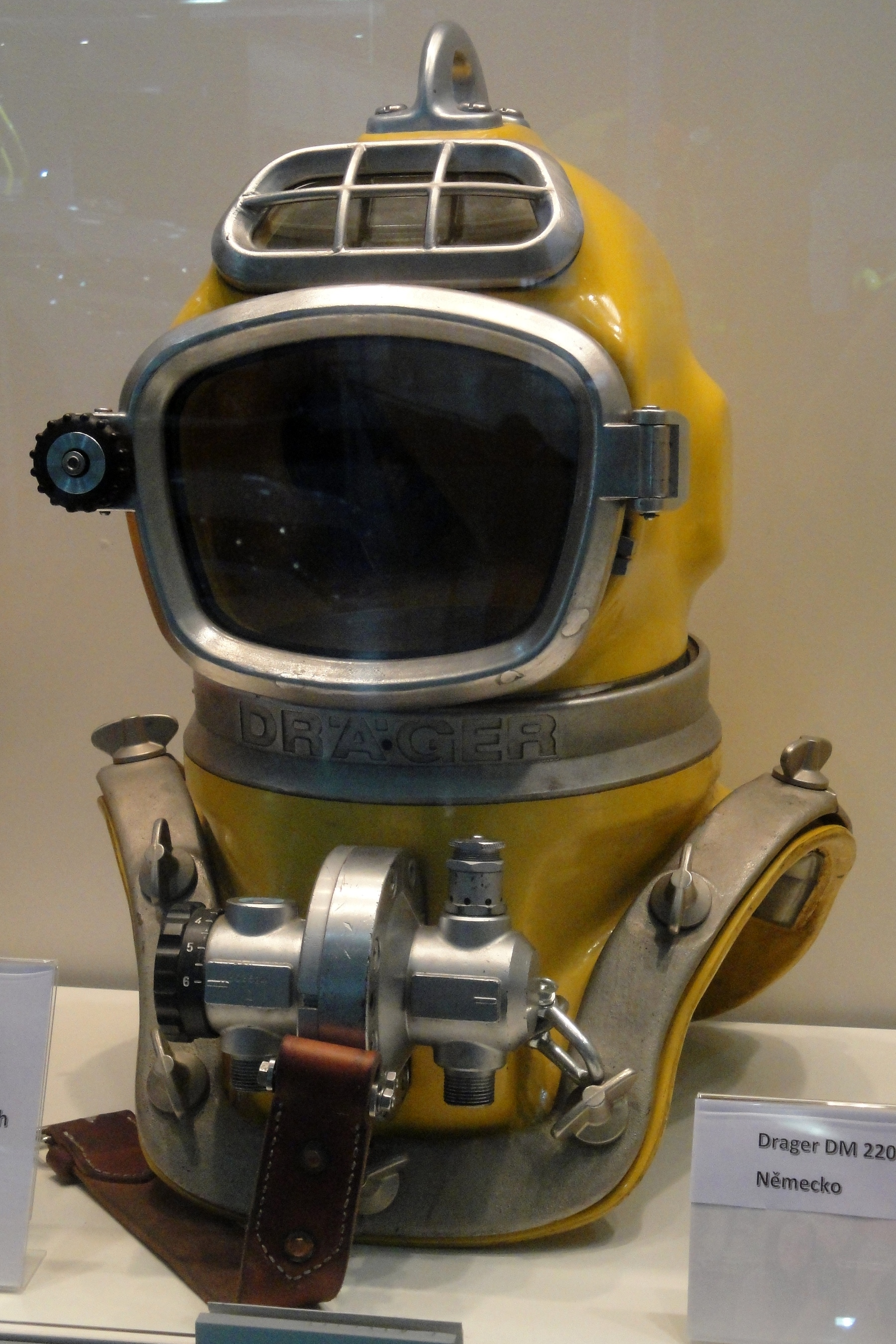
Dräger DM 220

=== Push-pull helmets ===
These are helmets which use a flow of supply gas which is recovered and recycled in a closed circuit system, such as from the atmosphere of a saturation system like a closed bell, underwater habitat, or lock-out submersible. The gas is pumped to the diver through the umbilical, and pumped back to the life-support system for carbon dioxide scrubbing and oxygen replenishment. Pressure in the helmet is maintained at ambient pressure, and the work of breathing is relatively low. A high flow rate must be maintained in a continuous flow system to compensate for potential dead space in the helmet, but as the gas is recycled, very little is lost. Lateral excursions are limited by the umbilical reach, but vertical excursions are restricted by the ability of the control valves to manage pressure variations between gas source and the helmet while providing acceptable work of breathing. The Divex Arawak system is an example of a successful push-pull system used in the SEALAB projects The Arawak V system, patented in 1968, is rated to be used at depths between 200 and 1,500 feet (61 and 457 m). The breathing circuit for the Arawak has no carbon dioxide scrubber, gas mixing facilities, or gas monitoring system, as it makes use of the breathing gas of the subsurface base unit, which is already continuously controlled and monitored. This makes the preparation and after-dive maintenance very simple in comparison with a conventional rebreather. Limitations include lateral range restriction according to the length of the umbilical, and excursion depth restrictions due to work of breathing changes caused by the regulator valves when the hydrostatic pressure variations are too large. The helmet is rated for upward excursions of 33 feet (10 m) and downward excursions of 100 feet (30 m).

== Safety ==
Use of a sealed helmet for diving is generally safer than a full-face or half mask, as the airway is relatively well protected, and the diver can survive a loss of consciousness until rescued in most circumstances, provided the breathing gas supply is not interrupted. There are hazards associated with helmet use, but the risks are relatively low. A helmet is also substantial protection against the environment. It protects against impact to the head and neck, external noise, and heat loss from the head. If sealed to a dry suit, and fitted with a suitable exhaust system, it is also effective against contaminated ambient water. Shallow-water helmets which are open at the bottom do not protect the airway if the diver does not remain upright.

One of the more obvious hazards is the potential for flooding, but as long as an adequate breathing gas supply is available, the helmet can be purged of water that gets into it. A helmet sealed by a neck dam can be purged without affecting the diving suit, and water will drain from the exhaust ports if there is no major structural damage to the shell, view-ports or neck dam. The shell and view-ports are tough and not easily penetrated. The neck dam is more vulnerable, but even a major tear can be managed by keeping the head upright to prevent flooding up against the gas inside. There have been cases of a helmet separating from the yoke, due to locking cam or locking pin failure, but safety clips on the cam levers and locking pin redesign make the risk extremely low on more recent designs.

Helmet squeeze occurs when the internal pressure of the helmet is lower than the ambient pressure. In the early days of surface supplied diving this could occur if the diver descended so fast the manually powered air supply pump could not keep up with the compression due to hydrostatic pressure increase. This is no longer a problem as gas supply systems have been upgraded. The other cause of catastrophic pressure reduction in the helmet was when the air supply hose ruptured much shallower than the diver, and air would flow out of the damaged hose, reducing helmet internal pressure to the pressure at the depth of the rupture, which could be several atmospheres. Since the standard diving helmet is sealed to a watertight dry suit, all the air from inside the suit would rapidly be lost, after which the external pressure would squeeze as much of the diver as possible into the helmet. Crushing injuries caused by helmet squeeze could be severe and sometimes fatal. An accident of this type is recorded from Pasley's salvage work on HMS Royal George (1756) in 1839. Helmet squeeze due to air hose failure is prevented by fitting a non-return valve in the line at the connection to the helmet. Testing of this valve is an essential daily pre-use check. A similar mechanism is possible in the helium reclaim systems used for heliox diving, where a failure of the reclaim regulator can cause loss of gas through the return hose. This risk is mitigated by the capacity of the neck dam or an emergency flood valve to allow the helmet to temporarily flood, relieving the pressure difference, until the diver can switch to open circuit and purge the helmet of water.

=== Maintenance ===
Since diving helmets are almost exclusively used for occupational diving, their maintenance and inspection is covered by occupational health and safety legislation, which generally makes the owner and employer responsible for required testing and maintenance. It is usually legal for a diver to maintain and repair their own equipment, but to work on equipment which will be used by another person, the technician must be certified as competent to work on that equipment. To avoid possible litigation, contractors will appoint a technician to inspect and where necessary, maintain and repair equipment used and owned by their employees, which should also ensure that the necessary records are kept. Detailed instructions for inspections, tests, maintenance and repairs for each model of equipment are provided by the manufacturers, and will usually include checklists for logging maintenance records.

== Ergonomics and fit ==
The range of available sizes is small, and although most helmets will fit a large range of divers, there are some people they just will nor fit satisfactorily. During training the diver may have a chance to try out several models owned by the school, and may be able to find a model that fits them best. Fit is more important on a helmet that is supported by the diver's head and neck, and moves with the head, as these need to be well balanced and snug fitting. Some adjustment can be made to the internal padding and straps to achieve a better fit provided the size is basically correct.

== Manufacturers ==
- Advanced Diving Equipment Company is an American manufacturer of diving helmets that produces the Swindell free-flow open circuit air helmets.
- Erik Andersson of Stockholm made standard helmets.
- Bikkers of Rotterdam made standard helmets.
- Emil Carlsson of Stockholm, Sweden, made standard helmets.
- Composite-Beat Engel is a Swiss manufacturer of composite helmets, including lightweight demand diving helmets.
- John Date of Montreal made standard diving helmets.
- DESCO, also known as Diving Equipment and Supply Company Inc, is an American diving equipment manufacturer in Milwaukee, Wisconsin They produce surface-supplied and scuba equipment, including standard diving helmets, and shallow water helmets.
- Divex, a subsidiary of James Fisher & Sons plc, manufacture the AH5 free-flow helmet, and some of its earlier versions. They also produce helium reclaim helmets using Kirby-Morgan Superlite 17C helmets with Divex Ultraflow demand regulators and Ultrajewel exhaust reclaim regulators the "Dirty Harry" helmet for contaminated encironments, and the Arawak series of 'push-pull' closed circuit helmets.
- Dräger & Gerling, Lübeck, Established 1889. In 1902 their name changed to Drägerwerk, Heinr. & Bernh. Dräger. Drägerwerk produced both rebreather and free-flow standard helmets.
- Drass-Galeazzi is an Italian diving equipment manufacturer of Drass D-ONE lightweight diving helmets.
- Eterne was a Brazilian manufacturer of shallow water helmets.
- Friedrich Flohr, of Kiel. Established 1890. Manufactured apparatus of Denayrouze type with three-bolt helmets and regulator backpacks. Later also produced free-flow helmets.
- General Aquadyne Inc. of Santa Barbara, California manufactured the fibreglass shell AH-2 free-flow helmet and DM-4 to DM-6 band masks. Production of the AH series helmets was later continued by Divex.
- Galeazzi of La Spezia, made standard diving equipment, including helmets for mixed gas.
- Gorski is a brand of lightweight demand diving helmet with a stainless steel shell, owned by Aqua Lung. In 2004, Leszek Górski's G2000SS diving helmet went into production, and in 2011, Gorski’s company was bought out by Aqua Lung. The G3000 helmet uses a high-performance Apeks GX300 regulator.
- L.G. Hammond of Miami, Florida, was a manufacturer of cast bronze shallow water helmets.
- Heinke of London, UK, manufactured standard diving helmets.
- IAC, of Italy, made standard diving helmets.
- Kimura (Nagasaki iron works), of Japan, made standard helmets.
- Kirby Morgan of California have produced a large range of lightweight demand helmets with fibre composite and stainless steel shells for air and mixed gas diving, including reclaim helmets. Several of the models are still in production, and several others are still supported.
- C.A. Lindqvist of Stockholm, Sweden, made standard helmets.
- Marinverkst of Karlskrona, Sweden, made standard helmets.
- Medi, of East Germany, made 3-bolt standard helmets
- Miller-Dunn Diving Co. of Miami, Florida, manufactured standard diving helmets and shallow water helmets.
- Morse Diving of Boston, Massachusetts, also known as Morse Diving International and A J Morse and Son, manufactured standard diving helmets, the US Navy Mark 12 deep water helmet, and shallow water helmets.
- Nemrod of Spain manufactured standard helmets.
- Ocean Development Corporation produced the Ratcliffe helmet, commonly known as the "Rat Hat", and was later bought out by Oceaneering International which continued production for a few years for their own use. It can function in either free-flow or demand mode.
- Charles Person, of São Paulo, Brazil, manufactured standard diving equipment and shallow water helmets.
- Pusan of Korea made standard helmets.
- Rouquayrol–Denayrouze, later Specialites Mecaniques Reunis, then Societe Charles Petit, and eventually Rene Piel (several name changes) manufactured both 3-bolt and 12-bolt standard helmets, and both demand and free-flow air supply systems. Trademarks include Rene Piel of Paris,and C H Petit, of Paris.
- Saturation Systems Inc., of California, mnufacturers of the Sat Hat, An investment cast stainless steel helmet invented in 1976 to 1978 by Donald Rodocker and Chris DeLucci who founded the company.
- Joe Savoie of Boutte, Louisiana, produced several versions of lightweight helmet of his own design, both free-flow and demand supplied.
- Scauda of Mareilles manufactured standard diving helmets.
- A. Schräder's Son of Brooklyn, New York, manufactured standard diving equipment and shallow water helmets.
- Siebe Gorman of London, UK, manufactured a wide range of standard helmet models over several years, including 12-bolt oval and square corselets, 6-bolt oval corselets, and a rebreather model.
- Snead Co., of Jersey City N.J. was a manufacturer of shallow water helmets.
- Società Anonima Lavorazioni Vari Appararecchi di Salvataggio (SALVAS), manufactured mostly military salvage equipment, including diving helmets.
- Yokohama Diving Apparatus Company, of Japan manufactured standard helmets, including helium gas extender helmets.

== See also ==
- Hard hat, also known as bump cap – Protective industrial headwear
- Diving equipment – Equipment used to facilitate underwater diving
- Human factors in diving equipment design – Influence of the interaction between the user and the equipment on design
- Motorcycle helmet, also known as crash helmet – Safety helmet used by motorcycle riders
- Standard diving dress – Copper helmet with rubberised canvas diving suit and weighted boots
