= Clearance Divers Life Support Equipment =

British military electronically controlled closed circuit rebreather

The CDLSE (Clearance Divers' Life Support Equipment) is made by Divex in Aberdeen, Scotland. It is an electronic closed circuit rebreather designed to be silent and non-magnetic. It allows diving to 60 metres (200 ft) using air as diluent, or up to 120 metres (390 ft) using heliox and trimix.

Some sources describe it as a "Stealth Clearance Divers Life Support Equipment."

As of June 2007, the Royal Navy plan to use it to replace the Carleton CDBA. It was introduced into service in 2010. Full Operation Capability was reached on 23 July 2011.

It is also used by the French Navy, Royal Australian Navy and Republic of Singapore Navy.

Its absorbent is designed to last four to six hours. Designed to work with either a bite mouthpiece and standard half mask, or with Divex's proprietary Dual Mode Mask.

== See also ==
- Rebreather – Portable apparatus to recycle breathing gas
