= John D. Craig =

American businessman, writer, soldier, and diver

- Born: John Craig; April 28, 1903; Cincinnati, Ohio, United States
- Died: August 30, 1997 (aged 94); Phoenix, Arizona, United States
- Occupations: Businessman; writer; soldier; deep sea diver; Hollywood stunt man; film producer; television host
- Years active: 1924–1997
- Spouse(s): Gloria ? (Married before 1938); Millie Day (Married after 1945)

John D. Craig (1903–1997) was an American businessman, writer, soldier, diver, Hollywood stunt man, film producer, and television host. He worked in the commercial surface-supplied diving industry from the 1930s on, and filmed aerial combat over Europe during World War II. He is best known for using film and television to show the United States public the beauties and dangers of Earth's underwater worlds.

== Early life ==
John D. Craig was born 28 April 1903 in Cincinnati, Ohio, one of five sons of a Scots immigrant John Craig. His father was born in Dalry, Scotland in 1868. Because the younger Craig was not given a middle name, he used "D." to create a stage name. He took the "D" from his youngest brother David, born in 1914. John Craig's older brother Tom was born in New York in 1901. The Craig family moved to Long Beach, California, where the boys spent formative years. In the early 1920s, the younger John Craig made his fortune investing in oil wells at Signal Hill, which were successful. They gave him the resources for extensive travel and an independent life.

From the mid-1920s through the early 1930s, Craig traveled throughout Asia and Africa, with many harrowing adventures, which he described in his 1938 memoir, Danger Is My Business. On the Pacific Ocean, he and his companions narrowly escaped with their lives when they came across a large band of drug smugglers. In China, when he and his friends were trying to trap tigers, Craig nearly died after being attacked by a tiger that climbed the tree in which he was supposedly safe. In Timbuktu, he and his friends were suspected by the military of being spies from the French Foreign Legion, and almost arrested.

== Diving career ==
In 1931, John D. Craig was hired by a Hollywood studio to travel to Cedros Island off the southwestern coast of Baja California, Mexico, to film the sargassum farming industry established by expatriate Japanese. He was surprised to find that the farms were deep underwater on the seabed. Because he and his crew were ill-equipped for deep-water diving (having only oxygen masks and goggles), Craig had to learn "hard-hat" diving from the Japanese "sargassa" farmers, who used decades-old diving equipment. For the next five years, while living on the Pacific coast, Craig worked on modernizing that equipment. At the same time, he hired on as a stunt diver for several movies, notably those of film director W. S. Van Dyke.

In 1936, Craig traveled to Great Britain and Ireland to prepare for underwater filming of an attempt to recover cargo (including possible gold bullion) that had gone down with the RMS Lusitania when it was sunk near the Irish coast in 1915. In 1935, a single British diver had managed to walk the decks of the sunken ship, so, such a salvage operation was considered feasible. But, after several trial runs, the intense sea currents and the cumbersome nature of the half-ton diving suit caused the plans for filming and salvage operations to be abandoned.

While gathering resources for the Lusitania dive, Craig worked extensively with the deep-sea diving expert Max Gene Nohl to perfect the equipment needed for such a deep-sea task. They did much testing in the Great Lakes of the United States. In 1937, Craig, Nohl, the diver Jack Browne, and Edgar End, M.D., co-founded the deep-sea diving equipment company, Diving Equipment and Salvage Company, in Wisconsin. It is now known as DESCO. Craig also participated in scientific research to determine the best mixture of gases for deep sea "hardhat" diving. — the result was a variation of heliox, a mixture of oxygen and helium that enabled divers to avoid the occupational hazard of nitrogen narcosis.

In 1938, Craig was part of a salvage team that unsuccessfully tried to find the Mexican crown jewels in a shipwreck off the Virginia coast. He continued to dive and explore the seas of the world throughout his life. In 1960, he worked with the US Navy on underwater sound research.

== Military career ==
Craig served as an officer in the U. S. Army Air Corps during World War II, in which he specialized in aerial photography. Commissioned as a captain, on April 1, 1942, he appeared on one of the first live television programs commercially broadcast in the United States, WNBT's "Thrills and Chills Everywhere", which presented "dramatizations of some hair-raising experience of an explorer or adventurer."

In 1943, Craig headed the 9th Combat Camera Unit of the 6th Air Defence Group in Europe (stationed in Cairo, Egypt). He supplied aerial footage to Hollywood's First Motion Picture Unit, which had been formed in 1942 as the 18th Air Force Base Unit of the U.S. Army Air Corps.

In 1944 after being promoted to Major, Craig was transferred with his film unit to England to document the D-Day invasion. He flew more than 35 missions in Europe and Africa, and aided in the aerial photography of the Ploesti Raid in 1944. (Some of his B-17 footage was reportedly used in the movie Twelve O'Clock High (1949), and again in the TV series of the same name.

Wounded in action late in the war at Remagen Bridge in Germany, Craig was awarded the Purple Heart — he was also awarded the Legion of Merit, the Distinguished Flying Cross, the Air Medal with four oak-leaf clusters, and the Distinguished Unit Citation with three clusters for his achievements. By the end of his military service, Craig had been promoted to Lt. Colonel, a rank he used as a title for the rest of his life.

After the end of the war, Craig visually documented the atomic bomb test site at Bikini Atoll in 1946.

== Writing career ==
Craig wrote many articles in the 1930s on undersea diving, exotic travels, and other subjects, both for popular science magazines (such as Popular Mechanics) and for "men's" magazines (such as Sensation and Argosy).

His autobiography/memoir, Danger Is My Business, was published in 1938 in New York as a book club edition by Literary Guild, and in London the same year by Arthur Barker Ltd. It was reprinted in New York in 1941 as a mass-market hardcover by Garden City Publishing. A paperback Armed Services edition was published in 1945.

In 1965, Craig and Morgan Clint Denn co-authored Introduction to Skin and SCUBA Diving, a hardcover how-to book on scuba diving, intended for the general public. A paperback edition was published by Sphere Press in 1969.

== Film career ==
Craig first became involved with the Hollywood movie studios in the early 1930s as a freelance cameraman and later, as a film producer for underwater subjects. From the mid to late 1930s, he also worked as stunt diver for various Hollywood film productions.

== Television career ==
From 1954 on, Craig was involved with five different television series. He was nominated three times for Emmy Awards.

- I Search For Adventure - Craig appeared several times in this locally produced Los Angeles documentary adventure show in 1954–1955. The show was produced by Jack Douglas. Craig also hosted the nationally syndicated 1954-55 travel documentary series, also entitled I Search For Adventure and produced by Jack Douglas.
- Kingdom of the Sea - Craig and the actor Bob Stevenson were hosts of the 1954-59 syndicated documentary series, Kingdom of the Sea. Each episode was 25–30 minutes long.
- Danger is My Business (1958–59) - at least 18 x 30 min episodes were made. Though named after his memoir, the series documented instead a wide range of dangerous occupations such as Pacific rafter DeVere Baker, United States Air Force Thunderbirds, Swiss search and rescue pilot Hermann Geiger, beach lifesavers in Sydney, firemen, and a whale trainer and shark vet. Craig produced, narrated and hosted the series. Syndicated television broadcasts of these episodes continued worldwide until well into the 1960s.
- Expedition! - Craig was host of the 1960-62 ABC-TV documentary series Expedition!, shown Tuesday (and then Monday) nights 7-7:30 PM. Old friends Fae Thomas and Peter Furst produced.
- Of Lands and Seas - Craig produced and hosted the syndicated documentary series, Of Lands and Seas, starting in 1967. The show had 260 half-hour episodes of Craig's work, with additional films from other film-makers — it was intended for daily weeknight presentation. Episodes continued to appear on national television through the late 1970s.

== Marriage and family ==
Craig married a woman named Gloria Rovzar before 1938, but the marriage did not last. He noted her name in his autobiography, but did not refer to her again in writing after the book was published. The two of them divorced sometime in the early 1940s. After World War II, he married Millie Day; they had two daughters together.

John D. Craig experienced a debilitating stroke in 1990. He died August 30, 1997, in Phoenix, Arizona, at the age of 94. He was buried at the Rose Hills cemetery in Whittier, California.
