= Joe Savoie =

Diver and inventor of diving helmets

Hilbert Joseph Savoie Jr., known as Joe Savoie (25 January 1926, Pointe au Chen, Louisiana – 10 March 1996, Boutte, Louisiana), was a pioneering commercial diver and inventor of lightweight diving helmets, particularly the neck dam feature which allows the helmet to be sealed to the diver independently of the diving suit.

After the Second World War he got into the newly established offshore oil industry in the Gulf of Mexico, Louisiana, and California, as a diver, and was known for his skills in oxy-arc cutting. He also got involved in the development of surface supplied diving helmets used in the industry. Savoie had no formal engineering education, but had a talent for practical innovation, combined with the experience of using a variety of equipment in the field, some of it of his own design.

== Family ==
Wife Joyce, born Dronet, daughter Tonie and son Louis.

== Early life ==
Savoie was brought up in south Louisiana in the Mississippi swamp-lands to a poor family, and grew up in an impoverished community during the Great Depression. His father was poorly educated but had an aptitude for mechanics, so he grew up in an environment of practical mechanics and tool use. He left school after grade six to work to help support his family, and at sixteen took a job at the Higgins Shipyard in New Orleans where he learned to cut and weld metal. He had a life-long interest in aviation, and enlisted in the U.S.Air Force, serving in the Second World War as forward gunner and flight engineer in B-24 Liberator bombers in the Pacific theater, which he survived without significant injury. During this time he further developed skills in mechanics and metalwork. While stationed in Alaska he developed a helmet for use in air/sea rescue, and applied for a patent for an automatic automobile transmission.

== Diving career ==
Savoie left the Air Force in 1957 and returned to Louisiana, where he was unable to find a steady job for two years. Two of his brothers had found employment in the diving industry, and in 1959 Joe joined the same company, Dick Evans, Inc. of Harvey, Louisiana, as a tender. After 10 months he had learned the trade and became a diver. The equipment in use at the time included US Navy Mk V diving helmets, converted war surplus gas masks, and Scott free flow masks. Savoie found the Mk Vs cumbersome and the converted gas masks and Scott masks flimsy, unsafe, and unsuitable for voice communications.

== Diving helmet development ==
His original intention was to develop a free flow helmet for his own use, as underwater construction and salvage work was dangerous. The helmet was intended to provide head protection, allow clear communications, and the mobility to work at any angle including inverted. The first helmet was built between January and March 1964. It was based on a fiberglass Italian motor cycle crash helmet shell and used his own custom-built stainless steel fittings as components. Two novel features of the helmet were the neoprene neck dam and the neck ring. Designs progressed from a helmet sealed to the neck of a dry suit to a version that sealed directly to the neck of the diver, allowing the helmet to move with the diver's head, which in turn gave the diver a significantly improved field of vision.

The neck dam made a seal between the helmet and the diver's neck, and allowed the diver a full range of head movement. It was attached to an oval neck ring, which was clamped to the lower rim of the helmet by two cams. The patent application for the helmet was filed at the U.S. Patent Office in 1964, but did not cover the neck ring and neck dam. This helmet had a flip-up faceplate, like the visor of a crash helmet, which allows the diver to open it between dives, drink and communicate freely without needing to remove the helmet.

The qualities of the helmet were recognised by the other divers at Dick Evans, Inc. and several commissioned Savoie to make helmets for their use. He spent most of the rest of 1964 and 1965 building more flip-up helmets, but later in 1965 hurricane Betsy devastated the Gulf coast, and sank a barge carrying 602 tons of liquid chlorine in the Mississippi River south of Baton Rouge. The U.S. Army Corps of Engineers were called in to manage salvage operations, and 24 divers, including Savoie, were brought in from Dick Evans, Inc. to salvage the chlorine cylinders.

== Helmet production ==
Several of the divers used the Savoie helmets, and this drew media and military attention. They were also mentioned in the official reports on the salvage. Demand for the helmets increased and although Savoie tried to find a company to manufacture them, he was unsuccessful and decided to do it himself. He set up the equipment between diving work and redesigned the helmet to simplify and improve the ergonomics, eliminating the flip-up faceplate and rearranging the air control and exhaust valves. In 1968 he retired from diving to manufacture fibreglass air and mixed gas helmets in his backyard workshop in Boutte. About 100 helmets were manufactured between 1968 and 1971, using motorcycle crash helmets for the shells. All these helmets were sold privately to individual divers. In 1971 he changed the design to a stainless steel shell, and about 200 were produced between 1971 and 1973.

By 1974 the product had a worldwide user base, but a legal dispute with an investor stopped production for a few years. When production restarted some demand helmets were also made. Production and development continued through the 1980s and into the 1990s.

== Death ==
In 1993 he started to suffer from congestive heart failure, and died on 10 March 1996, at the age of 70.

== Legacy ==
The neck dam sealing system invented, but not patented, by Savoie is considered one of the most significant developments and a major advance in the ergonomics of commercial diving equipment design. These design features were copied and further developed by competitors and became the industry standard. The new helmets also upgraded from free-flow to demand supplied, and from air to breathing gas mixtures like heliox. Some were used in semi-closed circuit applications. The viewports progressed from curved flip-up visors like on motorcycle helmets to fixed moulded face-plates with flat fronts, and the helmet shells from glass fibre reinforced resin to stainless steel. Savoie diving helmets were made in small numbers at his workshop in Boutte, Louisiana, mostly to customer order, and have become collector's items. Savoie therefore had a large effect on commercial diving efficiency and safety, but made very little profit from it, eventually dying in poverty at the age of seventy years. He is commonly acknowledged as the originator of the modern lightweight diving helmet. The concept of a neck dam was not new, as it had been part of the Mercury spacesuit system since 1961 or earlier, and dry suit neck seals had been in use considerably earlier, but these had all been part of the suits, not the helmets.
