= DESCO =

American manufacturer of commercial diving equipment

DESCO is an underwater diving equipment maker which was first organized in 1937 in Milwaukee, Wisconsin as Diving Equipment and Salvage Co.

It was founded by:

- Max Eugene Nohl, a diver who lived in Milwaukee. In the early 1930s, he had national publicity for his salvage operations on a sunken steamship, the John Dwight.
- John D. Craig, a Hollywood movie producer, a pioneer in underwater photography, who wanted to film the possible salvage of the RMS Lusitania.
- Jack Browne, a diver.
- Edgar End, a physician who worked in hyperbaric medicine.

In 1935, Nohl, Craig and Browne designed a lightweight heliox diving suit to dive to the liner Lusitania, sunk in May 1915 by a German U-boat in 312 feet of water, 11 miles (18 km) off the southern coast of Ireland.

On 1 December 1937, in Lake Michigan, Max Nohl dived to 420 feet (130 m) with DESCO equipment, breaking the previous record of 344 feet (105 m) set by British divers in 1930.

In World War II DESCO made hardhat diving gear and oxygen rebreathers for the US Navy.

In 1946, DESCO was sold to Alfred Dorst, who expanded the company's product base of exclusively professional, commercial and military designs to supply a growing peacetime leisure market with water sports equipment. Introduced in 1947 and discontinued in 1960, the DESCO sporting goods range included regulators, masks, fins, snorkels, spearguns, aquaplanes and water-skis. DESCO published a commercial catalogue in 1949 and water sports catalogues in 1949–1954, 1955, 1956 and 1957.

DESCO continues in business in Milwaukee. They produce various models of diving helmets, and related diving gear, and represent Viking Dry Suits, Composite Beat Engel DeepSea helmets, and Broco Welding.

The DESCO "air hat", introduced in 1968, is still manufactured and is popular among air divers and particularly those working in contaminated environments; its free-flow, positive-pressure design affords an extra safety margin when contaminants are present. As compared to demand helmets, the air hat is simple and inexpensive to operate and maintain.

In 2016, DESCO purchased the assets of Morse Diving International out of bankruptcy. They went into production of Morse Helmet models under the brand name A J Morse and Son. Current AJMS models in production are the US Navy Mark V and first generation commercial helmets in breastplate feed and bonnet feed variants. All helmets are available in polished or tinned.
