= Nemrod =

Spanish manufacturer of scuba and spearfishing equipment

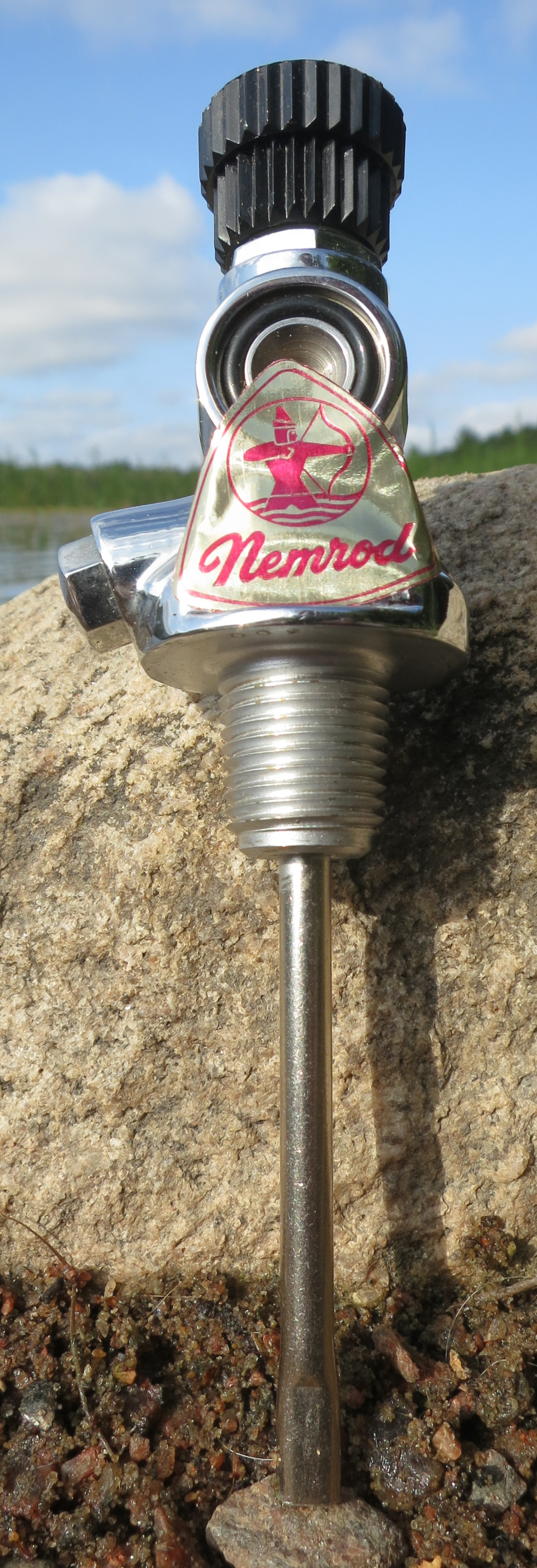
Scuba regulator by Nemrod

Nemrod was a Catalan company dedicated to the development and manufacture of diving and scuba equipment. It was founded in 1945 and ceased operations in 1999.

== History ==
In 1945, Pere and Joan Vilarrubís Ferrando brothers found Nemrod Industrias Vilarrubís, initially dedicated to the manufacturing of diving spearguns. The first spearguns are made with spring, with or without surcompressor followed, two years later, by the rubber Tarzan and Catapulta models. In 1953, the Comodoro pneumatic model is launched, followed by a very long series of models such as Crucero, Fragata, Galeon and, finally, the Clipper series, which will succeed until 1998, distinguishable because of their tank, which went from red to black. In parallel, the rubber speargun production expands, always more requested because of their silent action and precision.

In the meantime, Nemrod distinguishes itself as the main brand developing in Spain in this period among which Casals, Beltran, Parra, Copino; the latter, soon famous for its sophisticated spearguns.

In Nemrod catalogue, near its spearguns in 1957 the Snark III two-hose regulator appears, meant to become the longest-life regulator, being in Nemrod price list for almost thirty years. To note that the roman number in its name does not mean any sequence but the number of pressure reductions; in fact, it is the only three-stage regulator ever produced. The Snark II single-hose double-stage regulator follows, remarkable for its original shape.

In the following years, Nermod product range broadens. In 1966, the Siluro diving camera housing is born and, in 1970, the first Venturi Power fins. The company than, expands in the USA, where imposes itself under the Nemrod by Seamless brand name. Always in the 1970, it associates to the German Metzeler family with which, at the end, it will merge. This partnership becomes one of the largest manufacturers of diving gear, exporting in more than 100 countries and, in the next ten years, its catalogues become richer and richer, with different models of regulators, tanks, suits, buoyancy compensators, fins and, a large choice of accessories.

At the end of the 1990s, after a period of decline, the Nemrod brand disappears.

___________
