= Divex =

Scottish provider of diving equipment and related services

Divex Ltd
- Type: Private
- Industry: Diving equipment
- Founded: 1980 (As Gas Services Offshore Ltd).
- Headquarters: Westhill, Aberdeen, Scotland
- Key people: Danny Gray, (Interim Managing Director)
- Parent: James Fisher & Sons (LSE: FSJ)
- Website: jfdglobal.com

JFD (formerly Divex Ltd) is a subsidiary of James Fisher & Sons (LSE: FSJ) is a Scottish provider of diving equipment and related services.

== History ==
Whilst Divex publicly traces its roots back to 1790 and the formation of Barry, Henry and Cook (an Aberdeenshire foundry), its modern history begins in 1980 as Gas Services Offshore Ltd.

In 1981 ex-US Navy diver Don Rodocker established a company called Gas Services Offshore Ltd in Aberdeen. Don brought together British inventor Alex Copson's Helinaut valve with his Gasmizer reclaim system to provide the first practical heliox recovery system. His technology was proved on the highly successful HMS Edinburgh gold recovery project.

The industry quickly adopted Gas Services reclaim system technology following the success of the Edinburgh salvage and the company became well established in Westhill, only 50 meters from the site of the current Divex headquarters.

The company thrived and manufactured many gas reclaim systems throughout the 1980s until the offshore oil and gas industry suffered a major recession in 1987. At this point, the company was majority-owned by Air Products. It was diversifying and had formed subsidiaries: Hydrovision, producing ROVs and Hyox, manufacturing hyperbaric medical chambers.

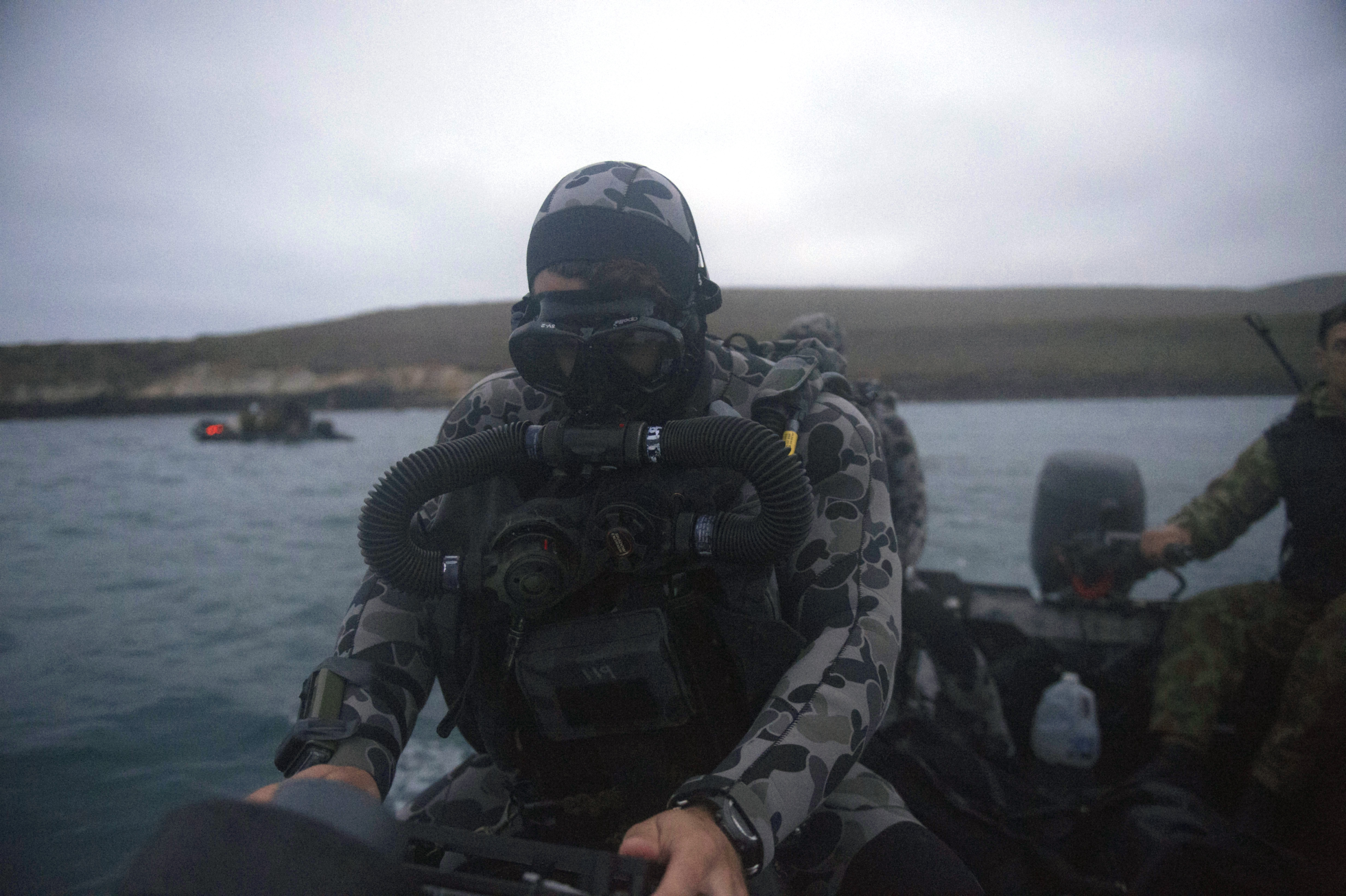
Royal Australian Navy Clearance Diver preparing for a dive with Shadow Excursion rebreather during Exercise RIMPAC 2016

Another Aberdeen-based company Mara Engineering, founded by former Divex Joint Managing Director Derek Clarke and providing subsea engineering design solutions, was also suffering from the effects of the 1987 downturn. A merger between the two companies allowed complementary services to be provided and overheads to be shared.

In 1990, Gas Services Offshore founder Don Rodocker decided to return to his native US, and a management buyout took place, led by Derek Clarke, who assumed the role of managing director.

At this point, the company was trading under the name Pressure Products Group (PPG) and retained the market identities of Mara Engineering, Gas Services Offshore and Hyox Systems.

In the subsequent years, other Aberdeen-based companies involved in diving and subsea equipment could see the benefits of becoming part of a larger group and a series of mergers and acquisitions followed.

PPG acquired UWI Circle, one of its closest competitors in 1997, which was itself a result of a merger between UWI and Circle Offshore. This strengthened the company's position as the leading supplier of commercial diving equipment in the UK. The Finance Director of UWI Circle at that time was Douglas Godsman, who would go on to be appointed joint managing director with Derek Clarke.

In 1998 the management decided that the Company needed a single corporate identity. One of the acquisitions, Subsea Services, had itself bought out an American company called Divers Exchange, formed in the 1950s in Louisiana. Divers Exchange had over the years become abbreviated to Div-Ex. As the company now owned this name it was decided that this was the most appropriate name for the new company, and so in 1998 the name Divex was adopted to replace Pressure Products and so became the Divex of today.

In 2001 Divex established a joint venture company Divex Domeyer in Germany to provide In-Service-Support to the German Navy, who had selected the Stealth EOD-M closed-circuit nonmagnetic rebreather.

In 2003 the first overseas entity, Divex Asia Pacific was established in Perth and Sydney in Australia, with Doug Austin as the managing director. Austin had previously been an employee of Divex in Aberdeen prior to emigrating to Australia.

In 2004 Divex acquired Southern Oceanics in Cape Town, South Africa, and rebranded the company as Divex Oceanics. In the same year, the company opened Divex FZE in Dubai, UAE. Divex FZE was closed in 2013.

In 2013 James Fisher acquired Divex Ltd for an initial consideration of £20m in cash plus a further maximum additional consideration of £13m linked to future profitability targets.

== Products ==
Divex is the manufacturer of various military and commercial diving equipment products.

Commercial Diving

- COBRA a bailout rebreather designed for very deep saturation diving
- Arawak series "push-pull" closed circuit helmets.
- Dirty Harry environmentally isolated demand helmets.
- Ultrajewel 601 helium reclaim helmets using Kirby-Morgan Superlite 17C helmets with Divex Ultraflow demand regulators and Ultrajewel exhaust reclaim regulators
- AH5 free-flow helmet, and some of its earlier versions.

Special Operations Diving

- Shadow Underwater Breathing Apparatus
- Shadow Enforcer Underwater Breathing Apparatus
- Shadow/B Underwater Breathing Apparatus

Shadow is a modular front-mounted rebreather platform used extensively by UK, US, Australian special forces groups. It is built around a number of components originally designed for the Stealth EOD-M. With the additional Nitrox Kit (formerly marketed as Shadow Excursion), its operational depth is increased to 24 meters. The unit can be reconfigured as a back-mounted unit (Shadow/B).

Shadow Enforcer is a further extension of the Shadow platform designed to use ExtendAir pre-packaged cartridges for shorter mission profiles.

Mine Clearance Diving

- CDLSE mine clearance rebreather used by the Royal Navy, Royal Australian Navy and others.
- Stealth EOD-M originally designed for the Royal Navy and used by the German Navy
- Stealth SC
