= Umbilical cable =

Bundle of supplying cables or hoses

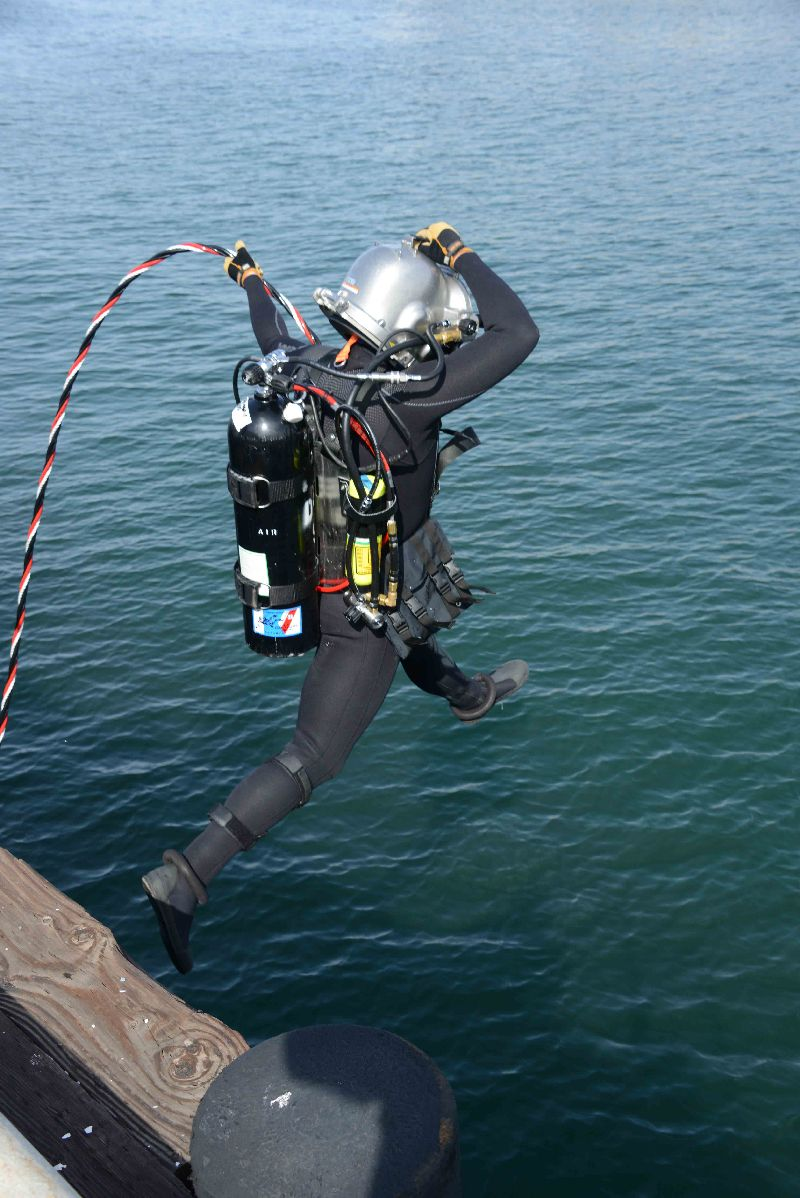
- Diver with surface-supplied umbilical
- Other names: Umbilical, diver's umbilical, ROV umbilical, spacecraft umbilical
- Uses: Power and consumables supply, communications and instrumentation cables
- Related items: Air line, lifeline, power cable, control cable

An umbilical cable or umbilical is a cable and/or hose that supplies required consumables to an apparatus, like a rocket, or to a person, such as a diver or astronaut. It is named by analogy with an umbilical cord. An umbilical can, for example, supply air and power to a pressure suit or hydraulic power, electrical power and fiber optics to subsea equipment and divers.

== Spaceflight applications ==
=== Rockets ===
Umbilicals connect a missile or space vehicle to ground support equipment on the launch pad before launch. Cables carry electrical power, communications, and telemetry, and pipes or hoses carry liquid propellants, cryogenic fluids, and pressurizing and purge gases. These are automatically disconnected shortly before or at launch.

Umbilical connections are also used between rocket stages, and between the rocket and its spacecraft payload; these umbilicals are disconnected as stages are disconnected and discarded.

=== Space suits ===
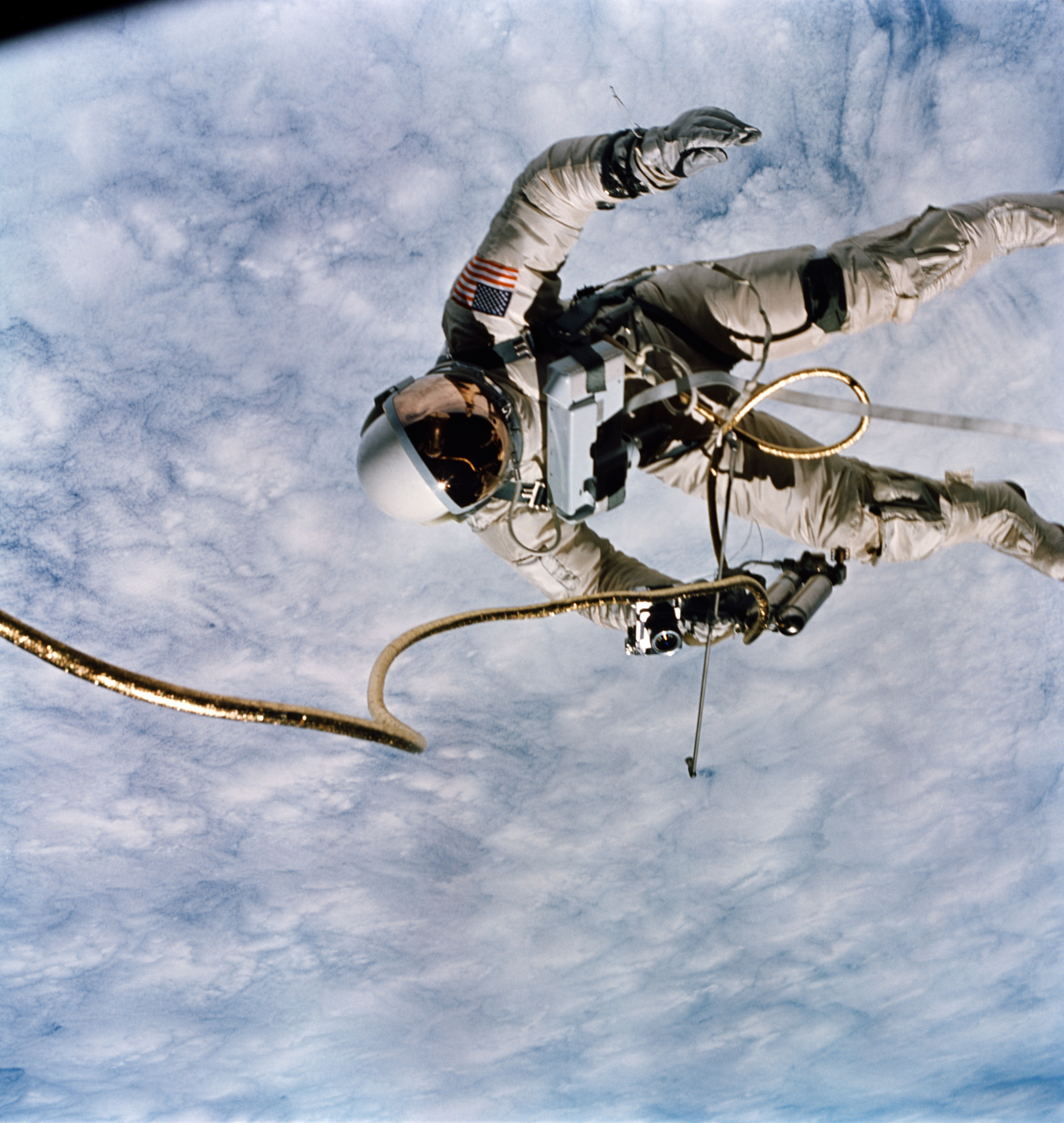
Gemini astronaut with umbilical

Early space suits used in Project Gemini in 1965 and 1966 employed umbilicals to the spacecraft to provide suit oxygen and communications during extravehicular activity (EVA). (Soviet cosmonaut Alexei Leonov performed the first EVA using a self-contained oxygen backpack, and thus did not require an umbilical.) Later designs (first used on the Apollo program lunar EVA in 1969) did not need spacecraft umbilicals, instead employing backpacks for self-contained oxygen, electric batteries, and radio communication.

== Subsea applications ==
Subsea umbilicals are deployed on the seabed (ocean floor) to supply necessary control, energy (electric, hydraulic) and chemicals to subsea oil and gas wells, subsea manifolds and any subsea system requiring remote control, such as a remotely operated vehicle. Subsea intervention umbilicals are also used for offshore drilling or workover activities.

=== Diver ===
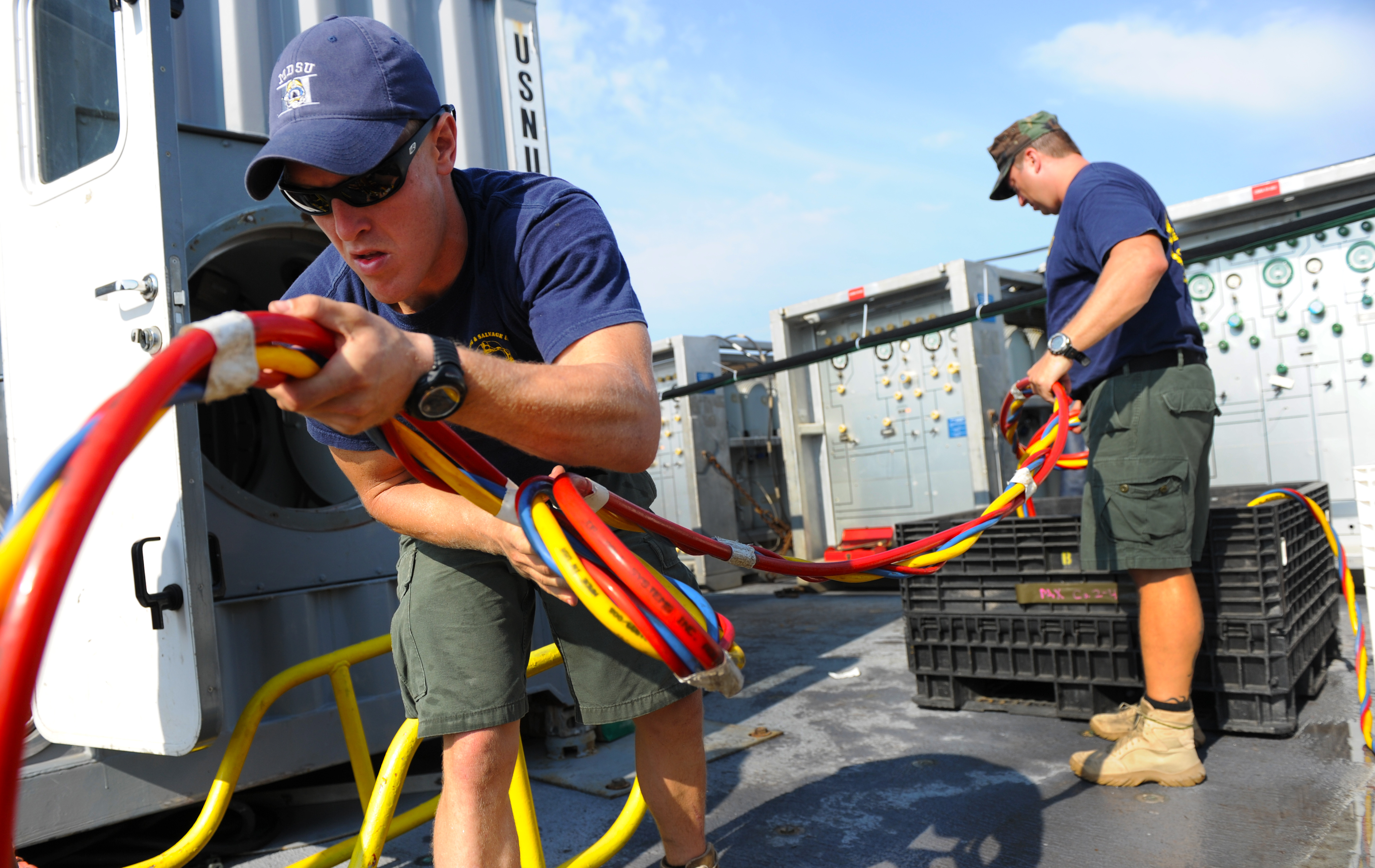
Umbilical for diver

A diver's umbilical is a group of components which supply breathing gas and other services from the surface control point to a diver. It is part of the life support system and will usually be inspected before use, and maintained and tested at specified intervals. The umbilical components are connected to the appropriate connectors on the diver's equipment, mostly on the helmet or full-face mask, and the strength member is usually attached to a strong D-ring on the diver's harness using a screw-gate carabiner or similar connector which will not accidentally release or snag on lines. The US Navy specify a snap-shackle for this function.

For shallow water surface supply air diving, the diver's umbilical is typically a 3-part umbilical comprising a 3/8 inch (9.5 mm) bore breathing gas hose, 1/4 inch (6.4 mm) bore pneumofathometer ("pneumo") hose, and diver communications cable, which usually also serves as a lifeline strength member. The pneumo hose is open at the diver's end and the other end is connected to a pressure gauge on the surface gas panel, where the supervisor can use it to measure the diver's depth in the water at any time. This is done by measuring pressure of the air in the pneumo hose after a thin stream of bubbles has been emitted from the open end which ensures that the hose has been purged of water so that the internal gas pressure is effectively constant and equal to the ambient pressure at the open end. The umbilical serves as a lifeline and must be capable of lifting the diver out of the water safely. Maximum permitted service life for rubber breathing air hoses is 12 years, but synthetic (unfilled polyurethane elastomer) lined hoses may be used without time limit while in good condition as long as they pass inspection and testing. Hot water supply hoses are more likely to be rubber lined, and polyurethane external sheathing is common for all umbilical hoses and cables.

A typical 4-part diver umbilical will also have a 1/2 inch (13 mm) bore hot water supply hose for the diver's exposure suit. A 5-part diver umbilical will also include a video cable to allow the surface controller to see the video picture transmitted to the surface from the diver's hat camera (video camera mounted on the helmet, facing forward, with a field of vision similar to that of the diver).

An excursion umbilical from a wet bell would be similar in construction, but shorter than an umbilical supplied directly from the surface for similar work. For saturation diving from a closed bell, a diver excursion umbilical includes a breathing gas supply hose, 5/8 inch (16 mm) gas reclaim hose, hot water hose, pneumofathometer hose, voice communications and lifeline cable, video cable and helmet light power cable.

Early diver umbilicals were simply the individual components bundled together and taped every metre or so with duct tape. These bundles tend to distort and produce kinks in the components caused by bending (particularly dangerous if the kink is in the divers gas supply hose), and require frequent maintenance. More recent umbilicals usually comprise all the components laid together like a twisted rope, so that there is little chance of a kink, no separate lifeline component is required, and no tape is required to hold the umbilical together. An additional component such as a video cable for a diver's camera, or a hat light cable, can be added by manually wrapping this additional component into the lay of the existing cabled umbilical. When there is risk of the umbilical cable being damaged by scratching on rock, coral or wreckage, the umbilical bundle may be over-braided with a polypropylene braid cover, or a velcro fastened textile cover.

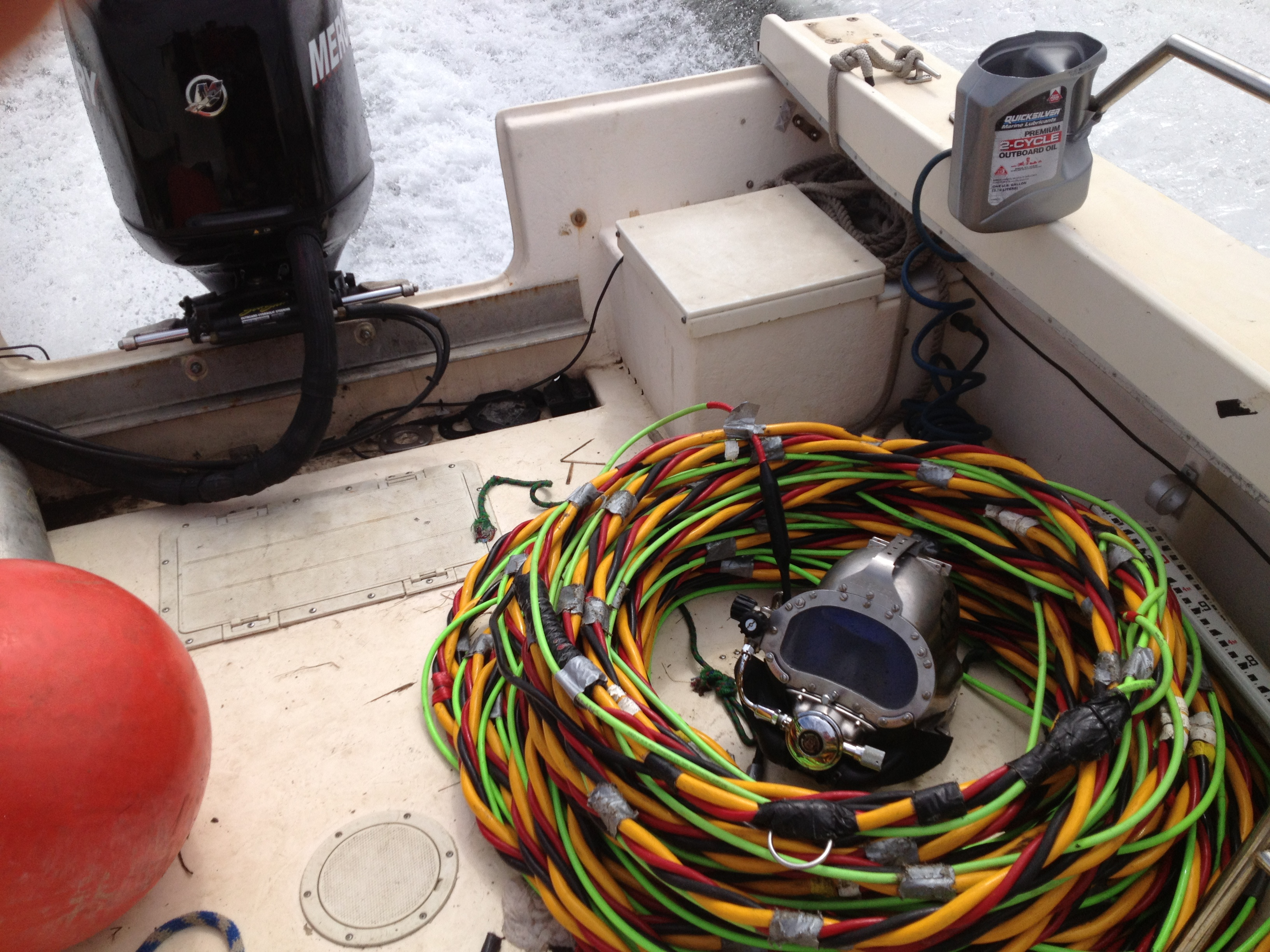
Umbilical Cable and Surface-supplied Kirby Morgan Dive Helmet

The length of the diver's umbilical will depend on the operational parameters. As a general rule a short umbilical is cheaper and more manageable than a longer one, and provided that it is long enough, shorter is generally safer. The standby diver or bellman's umbilical should generally be about 2 metres (6.6 ft) longer than that of the working diver to allow easy access to the diver in an emergency. A common length established by custom and experience is 30 metres (98 ft) for a closed bell diver's umbilical, but this may be varied when circumstances require. For surface oriented work it is often necessary to use a longer umbilical. Deployable length may be controlled by tying off the umbilical at the rack to reduce the risk of the diver approaching known hazards too closely. The IMCA specification is 5 metres (16 ft) minimum distance from a hazard.

The factors that influence length of a surface oriented umbilical include:

- The distance from the control point to the underwater worksite.
- The gas endurance expected from the bailout cylinder at the diving depth. This may be calculated on a return speed of 10 m per minute.
- Storage space available on a wet bell
- Type of umbilical, bulk and buoyancy characteristics.
- Current strength and umbilical drag
- Obstacles and obstructions that may foul the umbilical

Diver umbilicals may be negatively buoyant, neutral or positive, depending on the operational requirements. It is a common practice to mark them at length intervals using colour coded tape.

=== Diving bell ===
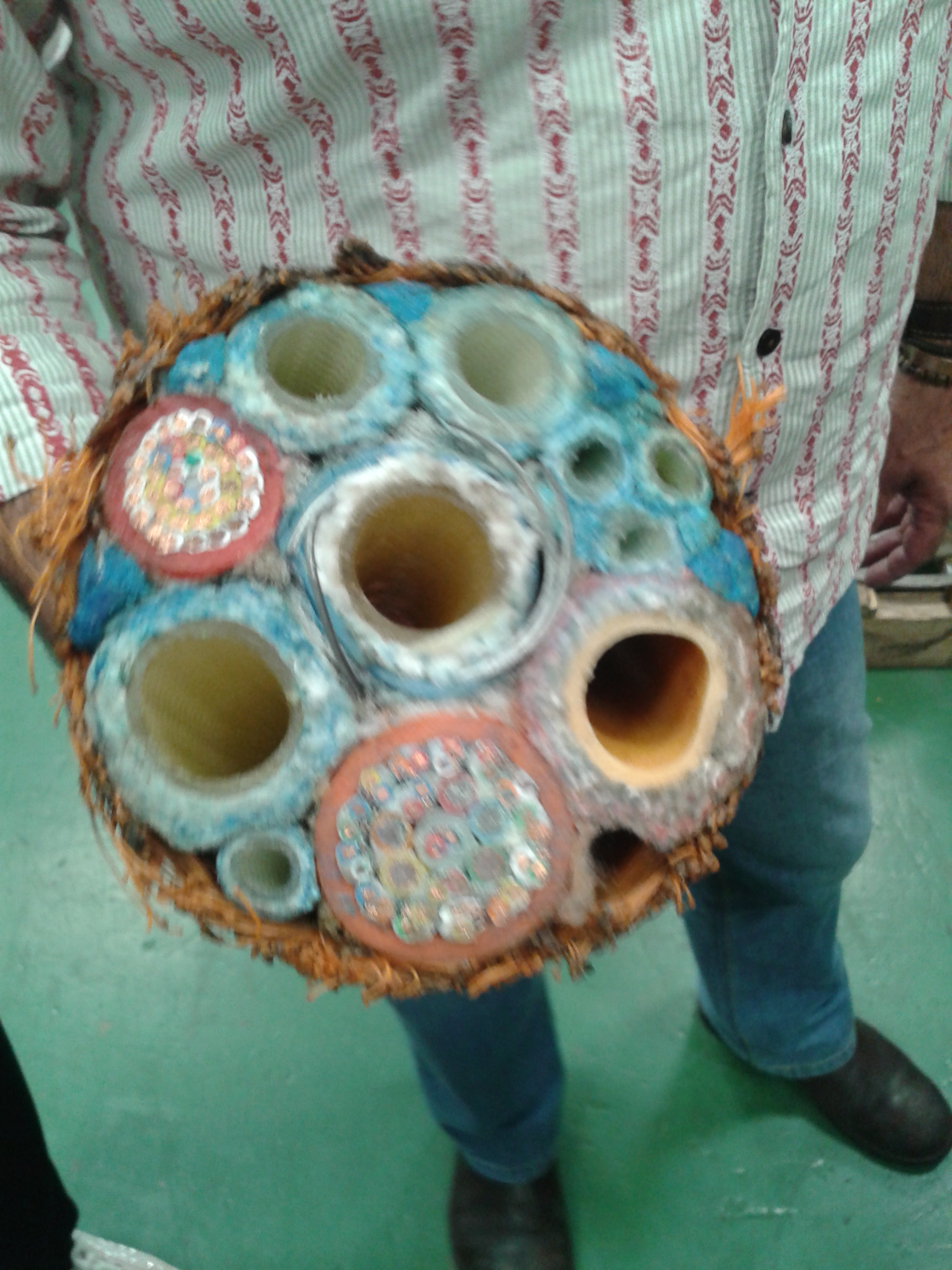
Bell umbilical section

Both wet bells and closed bells use a bell umbilical to provide surface-supplied gas, electrical power, communications and heating water to the bell and through the bell gas panel to the divers. It may also return reclaimed breathing gas from the divers to the surface gas system. The bell umbilical is generally not intended for lifting the bell. The bell umbilical is connected to through-hull fittings on a closed bell, which are connected to the bell panel inside, for distribution to the interior of the bell and to the divers via the diver's umbilicals. The bell gas panel is operated by the bellman.

A closed-bell handling system includes a bell umbilical handling system, which deploys, recovers and stores the umbilical.

=== ROV ===
Most ROVs are linked to a host ship by a neutrally buoyant tether or a load-carrying umbilical cable is used along with a tether management system (TMS). The TMS is either a garage-like device which contains the ROV during lowering through the splash zone or, on larger work-class ROVs, a separate assembly mounted on top of the ROV. The purpose of the TMS is to lengthen and shorten the tether so the effect of cable drag where there are underwater currents is minimized. The umbilical cable is an armored cable that contains a group of electrical conductors and fiber optics that carry electric power, video, and data signals between the operator and the TMS. Where used, the TMS relays the signals and power for the ROV down the tether cable. Once at the ROV, the power is distributed between the electrical components.

== See also ==
- Tether – Cord for anchoring a movable object
- Safety harness – Equipment designed to protect from falling
- Lifeline (diving) – A rope connecting the diver to an attendant, usually at the surface
