= Hot stab =

Type of subsea quick connector for offboard services

A hot stab is a type of subsea connector specifically designed to be easily inserted and removed by a remotely operated underwater vehicle (ROV) manipulator arm. The hot stab is the connector which supplies remote utilities. It is normally inserted into a port after removing the plug stab, which is left in the port when the hot stab is disconnected, to keep the port clean and free of fouling when not in use. The alignment is generally not critical for insertion, and the stab is guided into the port by the port geometry, which tends to be concentric cylinder and cone sections, tapering down from the handle end to the tip, with a series of O-ring seals separating the ports or contacts spaced along the length. The stab may be locked into place or may require the ROV to hold it in place while it is in use.

== Purpose ==
A hot stab provides a temporary pressure-tight connection between an external service and a subsea installation, which can be used for a wide variety of applications.

Some operations require low to medium flow rates for a short period to operate a mechanism from one position to another. These may be called static applications. Other operations need continuous medium or high flow rates.

== Applications ==
- Hydraulic – Used for hydraulic control fluids to operate valves, connectors, actuators, clamps, pumps and other systems.
- Chemical injection.
- Electrical power and communication connections.
- Multifunction hot stabs combine two or more of these services in one connector unit.
- Bell umbilical services may use a hot stab type connector for emergency services. This is likely to include hot water, breathing gas, and electrical conductors for power and communications.
- There are types defined by geometry and port specifications.

== Components ==
- The stab plate is a fixed position part on the subsea structure
- The receptacle is the part on the structure into which the hot stab is inserted. It receives and secures the hot stab and contains the static set of ports or contacts.
- The stab is the mobile component that is inserted into the receptacle by the ROV or diver. The stab which carries the services is the hot stab (or live stab), and the plug stab is an unserviced component of the same basic geometry used to close the receptacle when not in use, to keep out detritus and prevent growth of marine fouling, and to keep water out of hydraulic systems.
- The seals prevent leakage to the environment and between ports under high pressures. The seals may be pressure balanced to prevent separation forces.
- Alignment aids may include a guide nose, funnel, bucket, and latches, to facilitate precise alignment of the stab and receptacle.
- The stab is connected to hoses and/or cables to supply fluids or electrical power or signals to the appropriate ports or contacts. of the receptacle.
- The handle allows the ROV or diver to grip, manipulate and move the stab.
- Non-return valves may be used in the stab or receptacle to prevent loss of fluids to the environment.

The American Petroleum Institute (API) has published "API 17H recommended practice for subsea production systems", which provides specifications for standard types of hydraulic hot stabs with flow path bores ranging from 0.25 to 3.5 inches (6.4 to 88.9 mm).

== Terminology ==
- The term "stab" is used for the insertable component (pin), the combination of pin and box (receptacle), and the action of inserting the pin into the receptacle.
- "Hot stab" may refer to the insertable component with services, or to the technology in general.
- "Live stab" or "live hot stab"refers to the insertable component with services.
- "Plug stab", "dummy stab", "blind stab" or "parking stab" is the insertable component without services used for blanking off the receptacle.
- The receptacle may also be called the "box".

== Sizing ==
A hot stab can be specified by the inside diameter of the receptacle, the bore and number of the ports and the type of handle. API/ISO specifications identify stabs by type, size, and port geometry and are interchangeable if the API/ISO-type, size and port specification match.

== Operation ==
Removal of the plug stab (also known as the dummy or parking stab) from the receptacle is followed by insertion of the hot stab into the port. This operation can be done by a diver or a ROV with manipulator arm. The stab is not a self-locking mechanism, and though the internal forces may be balanced, an external force is required to secure the stab in place in the receptacle.

== Standards ==
- ISO 13624-1:2009, Petroleum and natural gas industries – Drilling and production equipment – Part 1:Design and operation of marine drilling riser equipment.

== Sources ==
- Schimmel, Daniël (2018). "Hot Stab". Improvement of a Subsea Hot Stab Operation (Master thesis). TU Delft. pp. 11–14.
