= Franz Kessler =

German painter

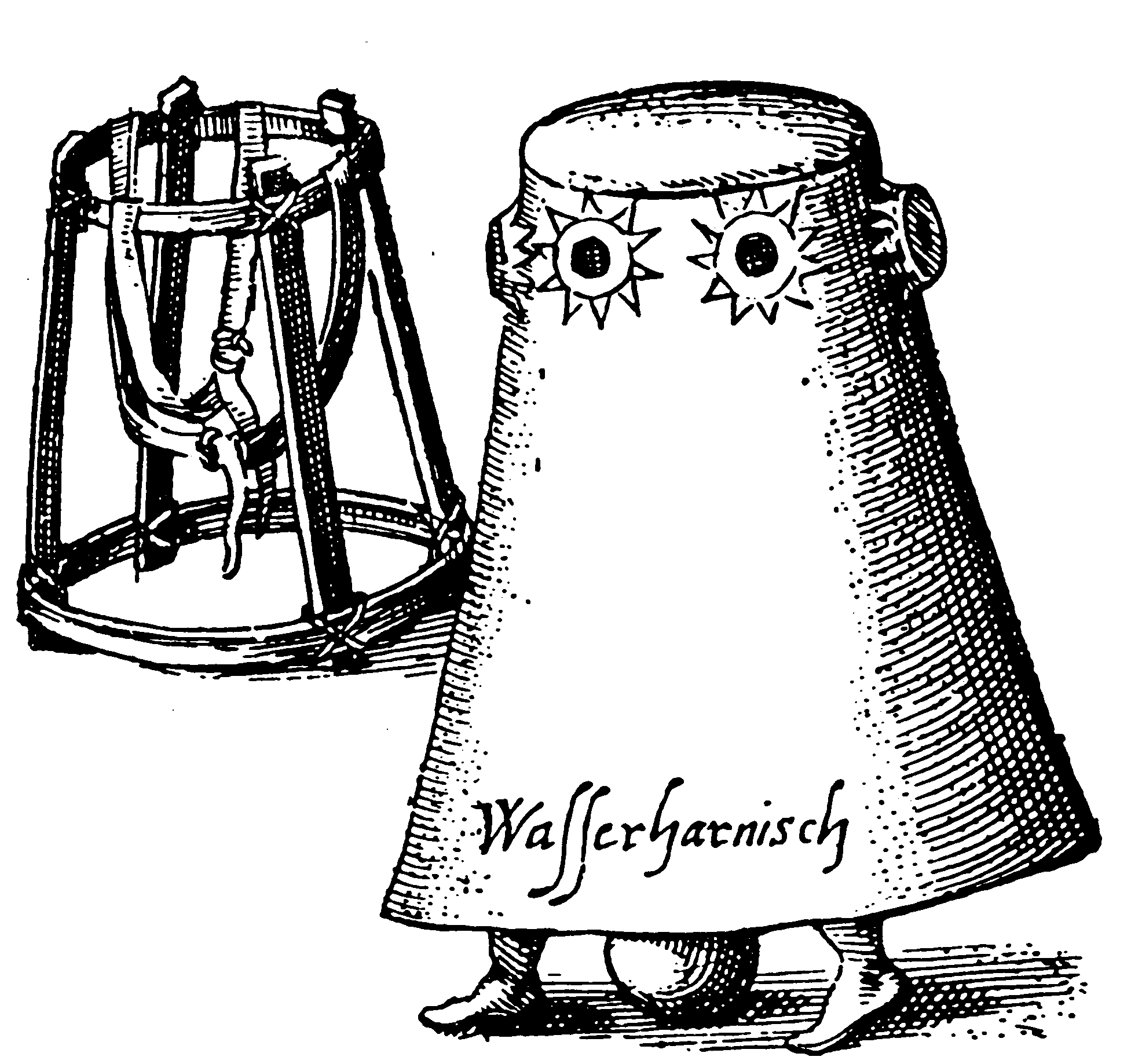
Franz Kessler's diving harness

Franz Kessler (c. 1580–1650) was a portrait painter, scholar, inventor and alchemist living in the Holy Roman Empire during the 16th and 17th centuries.

== Writing ==
He wrote a number of books and pamphlets: a book on stoves, on making sundials, on using a "sector" or "proportional instrument" (a simple calculator), and on using "Napier's bones" (another calculator) – among other works.

== Painting ==
In the 1620s and 1630s, he was a portrait painter in Cologne, Germany.

== Inventions ==
He wrote a book called Unterschiedliche bisshero mehrern Theils Secreta oder verborgene, geheime Kunste (Various until now mostly Secreta or hidden, secret arts), which was published in Oppenheim in 1616. The first five chapters of this book deal with communicating via a crude Aldis lamp.

In the same year he built an improved diving bell.
