= Diving bell =

Chamber for transporting divers vertically through the water

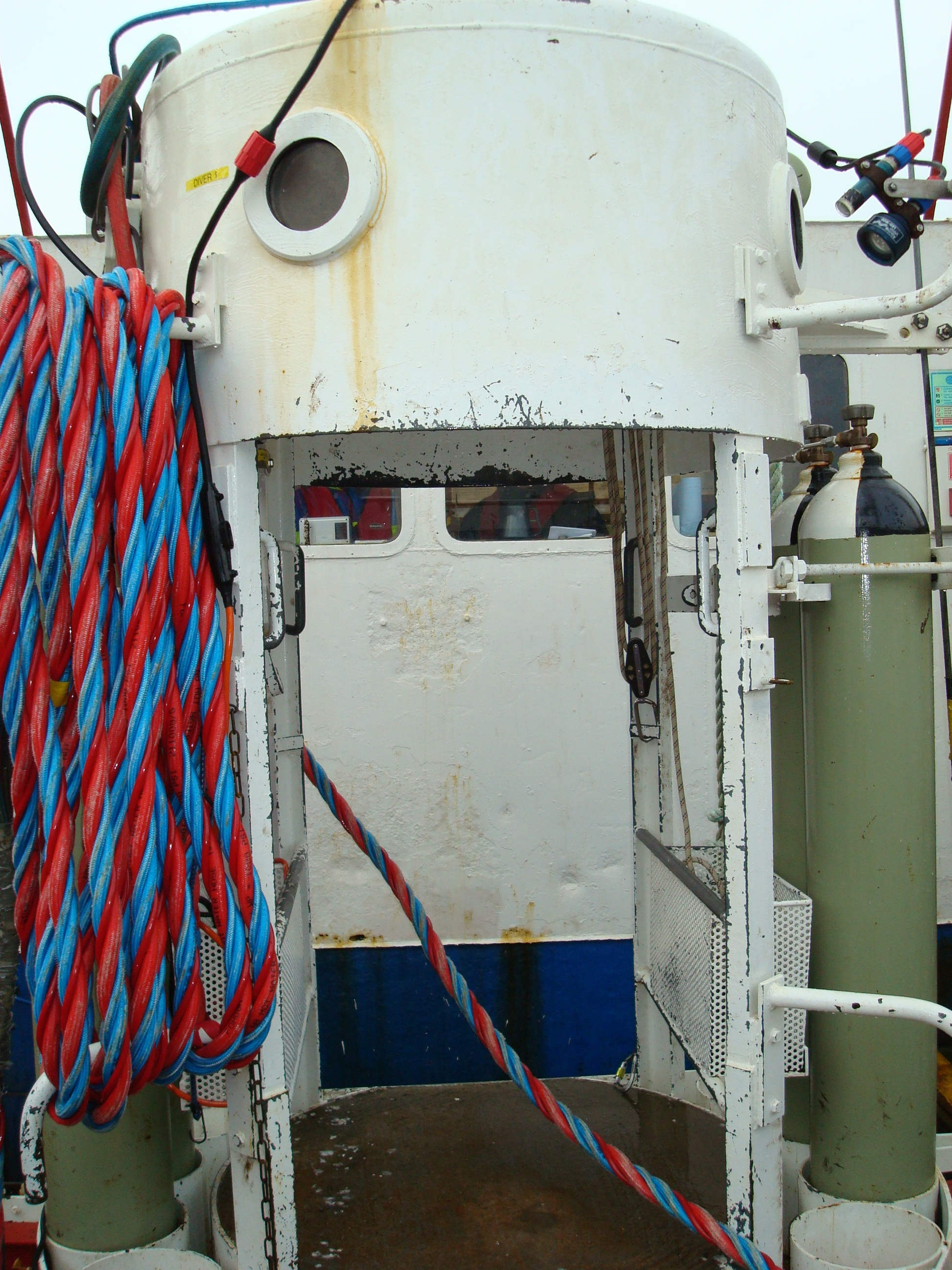
- Exterior view of an open (wet) diving bell
- Other names: Closed bell; Personnel transfer capsule; Wet bell; Open bell
- Uses: Transportation of surface supplied and saturation divers from the surface to the underwater workplace and back.

A diving bell is a rigid chamber used to transport divers from the surface to depth and back in open water, usually for the purpose of performing underwater work. The most common types are the open-bottomed wet bell and the closed bell, which can maintain an internal pressure greater than the external ambient. Diving bells are usually suspended by a cable, and lifted and lowered by a winch from a surface support platform. Unlike a submersible, the diving bell is not designed to move under the control of its occupants, or to operate independently of its launch and recovery system.

The wet bell is a structure with an airtight canopy which is open to the water at the bottom, that is lowered underwater to operate as a base or a means of transport for a small number of divers. Air is trapped inside the bell canopy by pressure of the water at the interface. These were the first type of diving chamber, and are still in use in modified form.

The closed bell is a pressure vessel for human occupancy, which may be used for bounce diving or saturation diving, with access to the water through a hatch at the bottom. The hatch is sealed before ascent to retain internal pressure. At the surface, this type of bell can lock on to a hyperbaric chamber where the divers live under saturation or are decompressed. The bell is mated with the chamber system via the bottom hatchway or a side hatchway, and the trunking in between is pressurized to enable the divers to transfer through to the chamber under pressure. In saturation diving the bell is merely the ride to and from the job, and the chamber system is the living quarters. If the dive is relatively short (a bounce dive), decompression can be done in the bell in exactly the same way it would be done in the chamber.

A third type is the rescue bell, used for the rescue of personnel from sunk submarines which have maintained structural integrity. These bells may operate at atmospheric internal pressure and must withstand the ambient water pressure.

== History ==
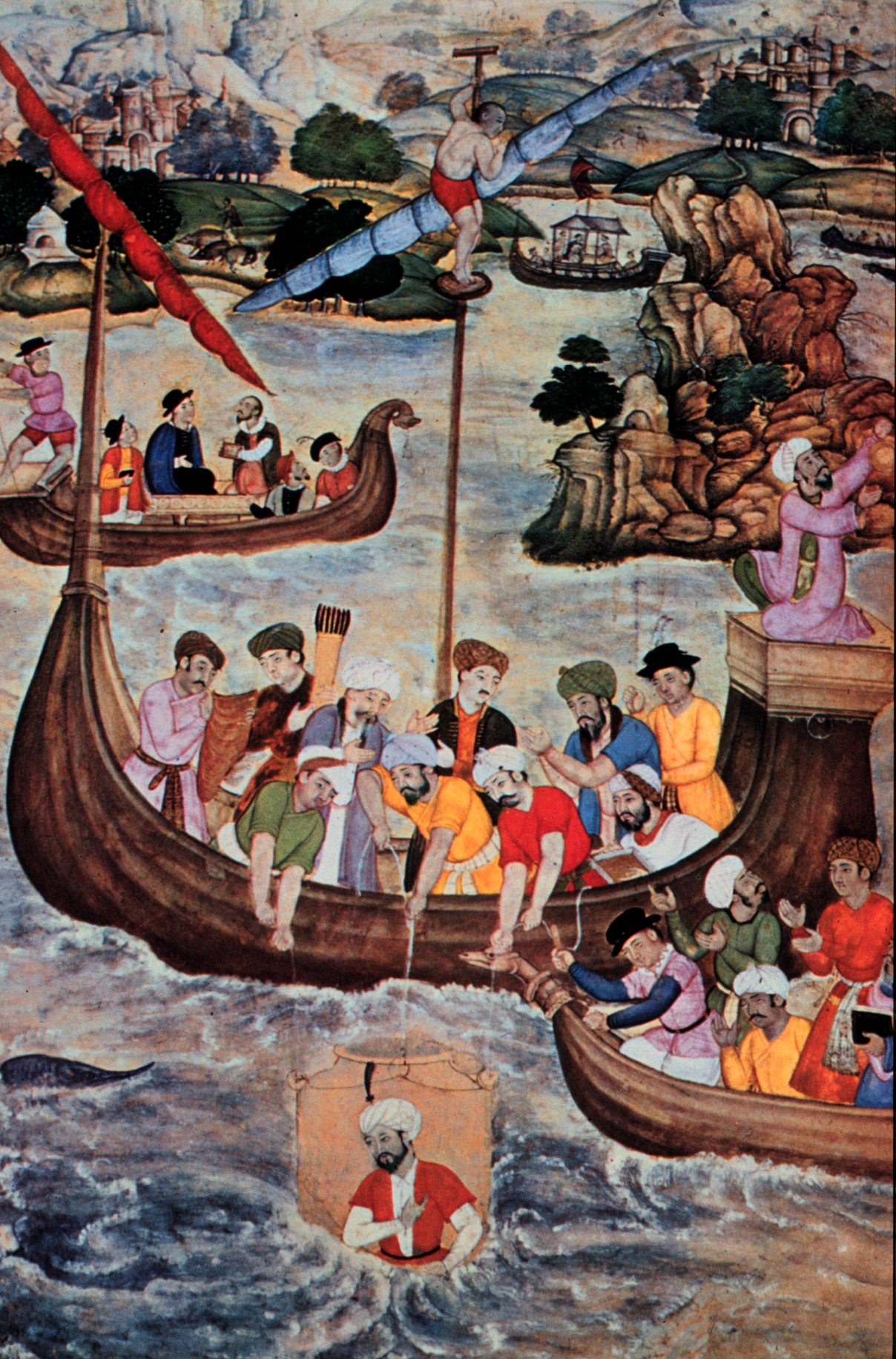
16th century Islamic painting of Alexander the Great lowered in a glass diving bell

The diving bell is one of the earliest types of equipment for underwater work and exploration. Its use was first described by Aristotle in the 4th century BC: "They enable the divers to respire equally well by letting down a cauldron, for this does not fill with water, but retains the air, for it is forced straight down into the water." There are apocryphal accounts of Alexander the Great (including some versions of the Alexander Romance), exploring underwater in an enclosed vessel, lowered from his ships. Their origin is hard to determine, but some of the earliest dated works are from the early Middle Ages.

In 1535, Guglielmo de Lorena built and tested a diving bell, to explore a sunken vessel in a lake near Rome. De Lorena's diving bell only had space for enough oxygen for a few minutes. However, the air in his diving bell was reported to last for one to two hours with the limiting factor being a diver's ability to withstand cold and fatigue, not lack of oxygen. The mechanism he used needed to keep the pressure inside the bell continuous, supply fresh air, and remove air exhaled by the diver. To accomplish this, it is believed that de Lorena used a system similar to Edmond Halley's design, two and a half centuries later.

An improved, but possibly unbuilt, design from 1616 by Franz Kessler featured a bell covering a diver down to their ankles, and added windows and a ballast to the bottom. This design supposedly no longer needed to be tethered to the surface, although there is no evidence it was actually built.

In 1642, John Winthrop reported one Edward Bendall building two large wooden barrels, weighted with lead and open at their bottoms, to salvage a ship Mary Rose which had exploded and sunk, blocking the harbor of Charlestown, Boston. Bendall undertook the work on condition that he be awarded all the value of the salvage should he succeed in unblocking the harbor, or half the value he could salvage if he could not.

In 1658, Albrecht von Treileben was permitted to salvage the warship Vasa, which sank in Stockholm harbor on its maiden voyage in 1628. Between 1663 and 1665 von Treileben's divers were successful in raising most of the cannon, working from a diving bell.

A diving bell is mentioned in the 1663 Ballad of Gresham College (stanza 16):

A wondrous Engine is contriveing
In forme, t'is said, much like a Bell,
Most usefull for the Art of Diveing.
If 't hitt, 't will prove a Miracle;
For, gentlemen, 't is no small matter
To make a man breath under water.

In late 1686, Sir William Phipps convinced investors to fund an expedition to what is now Haiti and the Dominican Republic to find sunken treasure, despite the location of the shipwreck being based entirely on rumor and speculation. In January 1687, Phipps found the wreck of the Spanish galleon Nuestra Señora de la Concepción off the coast of Santo Domingo. Some sources say they used an inverted container for the salvage operation while others say the crew was assisted by Indian divers in the shallow waters. The operation lasted from February to April 1687 during which time they salvaged jewels, some gold and 30 tons of silver which, at the time, was worth over £200,000.

In 1689, Denis Papin suggested that the pressure and fresh air inside a diving bell could be maintained by a force pump or bellows. Engineer John Smeaton utilized this concept in 1789.

In 1691, Dr. Edmond Halley completed plans for a diving bell capable of remaining submerged for extended periods of time, and fitted with a window for the purpose of undersea exploration. In Halley's design, atmosphere is replenished by sending weighted barrels of air down from the surface.

Spalding's Diving Bell, The Saturday Magazine, Vol. 14, 1839

In 1775, Charles Spalding, an Edinburgh confectioner, improved on Halley's design by adding a system of balance-weights to ease the raising and lowering of the bell, along with a series of ropes for signaling the surface crew. Spalding and his nephew, Ebenezer Watson, later suffocated off the coast of Dublin in 1783 doing salvage work in a diving bell of Spalding's design.

== Mechanics ==
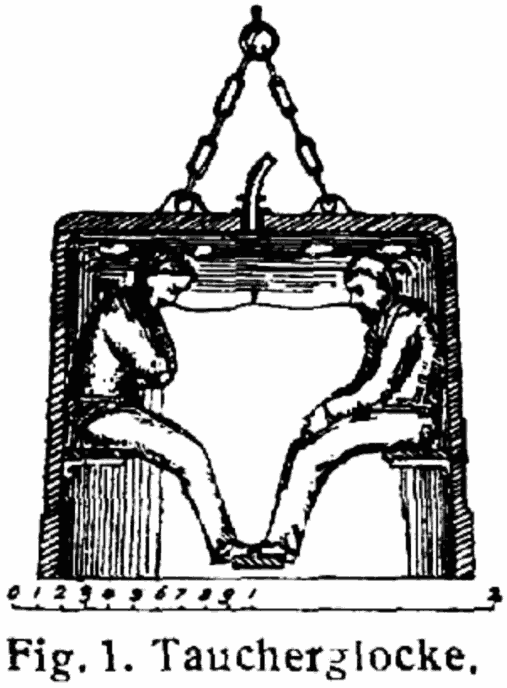
Occupied diving bell illustrated. From Otto Lueger, Lexikon der gesamten Technik (Dictionary of Technology), 1904

The bell is lowered into the water by cables from a crane, gantry or A-frame attached to a floating platform or shore structure. The bell is ballasted so as to remain upright in the water and to be negatively buoyant, so that it will sink even when full of air.

Hoses, supplied by gas compressors or banks of high pressure storage cylinders at the surface, provide breathing gas to the bell, serving two functions:

- Fresh gas is available for breathing by the occupants.
- Volume reduction of the air in an open bell due to increasing hydrostatic pressure as the bell is lowered is compensated. Adding pressurized gas ensures that the gas space within the bell remains at constant volume as the bell descends in the water. Otherwise the bell would partially fill with water as the gas was compressed.

The physics of the diving bell applies also to an underwater habitat equipped with a moon pool, which is like a diving bell enlarged to the size of a room or two, and with the water–air interface at the bottom confined to a section rather than forming the entire bottom of the structure.

=== Wet bell ===
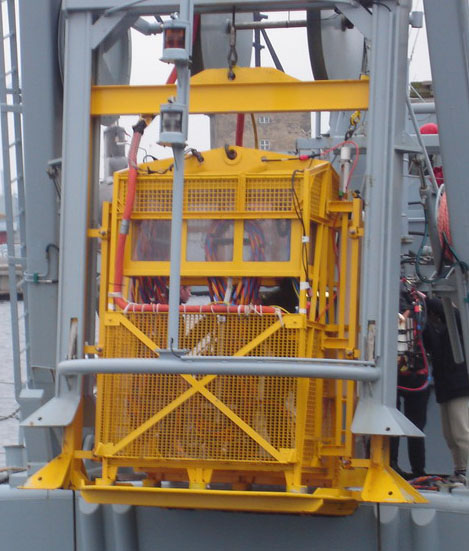
Open diving bell on a stern mounted launch and recovery system

A wet bell, or open bell, is a platform for lowering and lifting divers to and from the underwater workplace, which has an air filled space, open at the bottom, where the divers can stand or sit with their heads out of the water. The air space is at ambient pressure at all times, so there are no great pressure differences, and the greatest structural loads are usually self weight and the buoyancy of the air space. A fairly heavy ballast is often required to counteract the buoyancy of the airspace, and this is usually set low at the bottom of the bell, which helps with stability. The base of the bell is usually a grating or deck which the divers can stand on, and folding seats may be fitted for the divers' comfort during ascent, as in-water decompression may be long. Other equipment that is carried on the bell includes cylinders with the emergency gas supply, and racks or boxes for tools and equipment to be used on the job. There may be a tackle for hoisting and supporting a disabled diver so that their head projects into the air space.

==== Type 1 wet bell ====
The type 1 wet bell does not have an umbilical supplying the bell, because diver's umbilicals supply the divers directly from the surface, similar to a diving stage. Divers deploying from a type 1 bell will exit on the opposite side to where the umbilicals enter the bell so that the umbilicals pass through the bell and the divers can find their way back to the bell at all times by following the umbilical. Bailout from a type 1 bell is done by exiting the bell on the side that the umbilicals enter the bell so they no longer pass through the bell, leaving the divers free to surface.

==== Type 2 wet bell ====
A gas panel inside the bell is supplied by the bell umbilical and the emergency gas cylinders, and supplies the divers' umbilicals and sometimes built-in breathing system (BIBS) sets. There will be racks to hang the divers' excursion umbilicals, which for this application must not be buoyant. Abandonment of a type 2 wet bell requires the divers to manage their own umbilicals as they ascend along a remaining connection to the surface.

==== Operation of a wet bell ====
The bell with divers on board is deployed from the working platform (usually a vessel) by a crane, davit, or other mechanism with a man-rated winch. The bell is lowered into the water and to the working depth at a rate recommended by the decompression schedule, and which allows the divers to equalize comfortably. Wet bells with an air space will have the air space topped up as the bell descends and the air is compressed by increasing hydrostatic pressure. The air will also be refreshed as required to keep the carbon dioxide level acceptable to the occupants. The oxygen content is also replenished, but this is not the limiting factor, as the oxygen partial pressure will be higher than in surface air due to the depth.

When the bell is raised, the pressure will drop and excess air due to expansion will automatically spill under the edges. If the divers are breathing from the bell airspace at the time, it may need to be vented with additional air to maintain a low carbon dioxide level. The decrease in pressure is proportional to the depth as the airspace is at ambient pressure, and the ascent must be conducted according to the planned decompression schedule appropriate to the depth and duration of the diving operation.

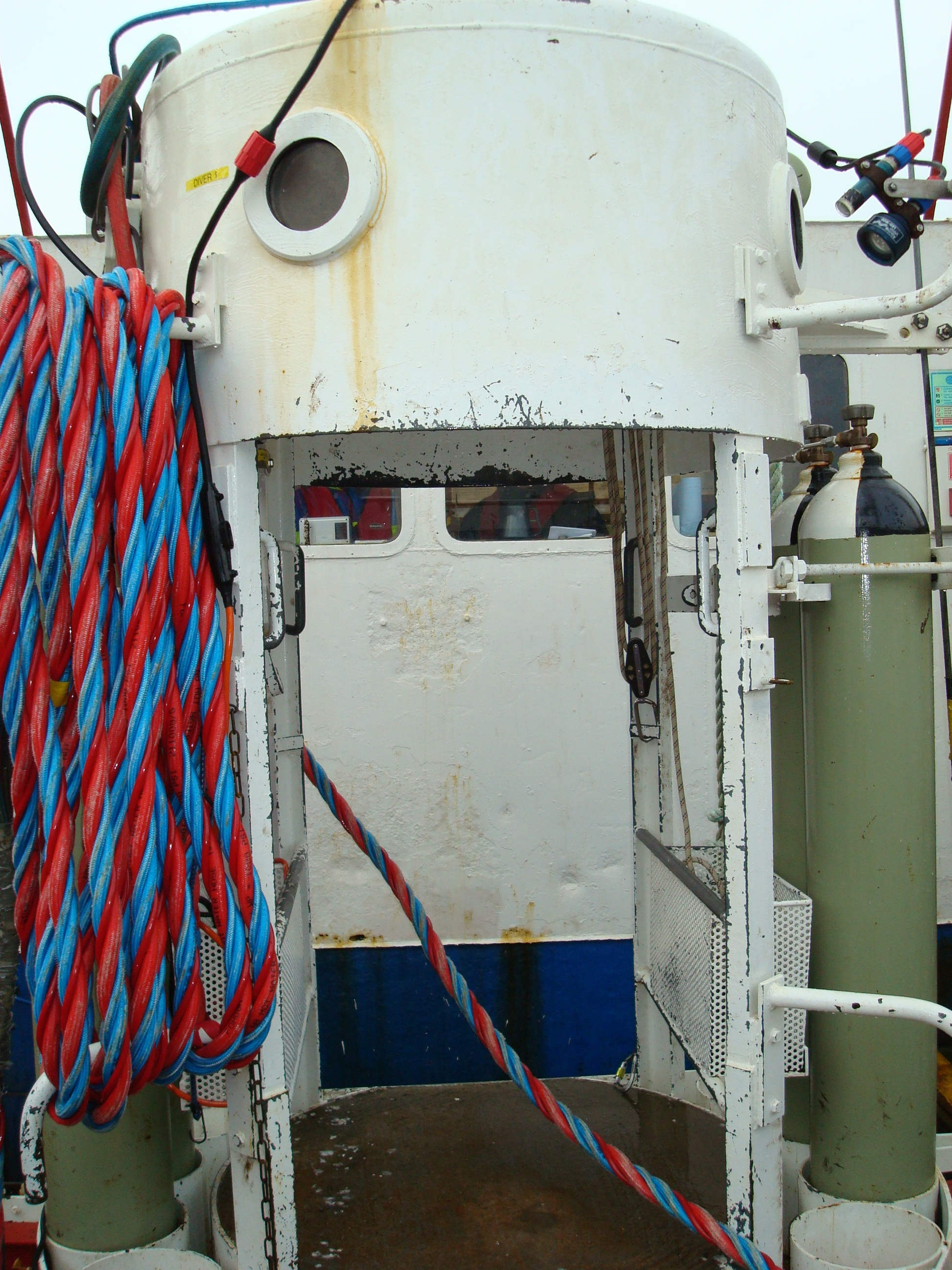
Wet bell exterior view

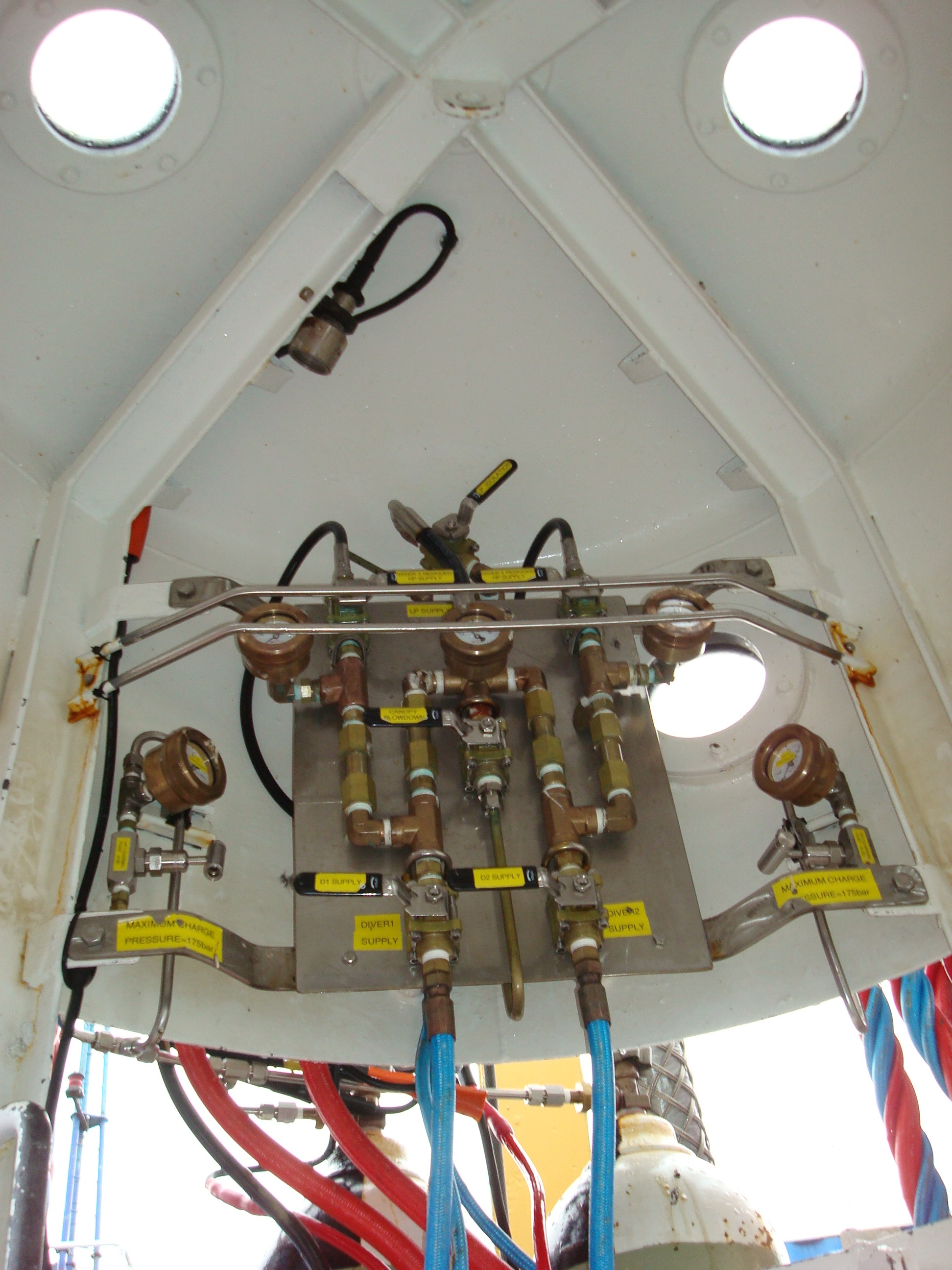
Wet bell interior showing bell gas panel

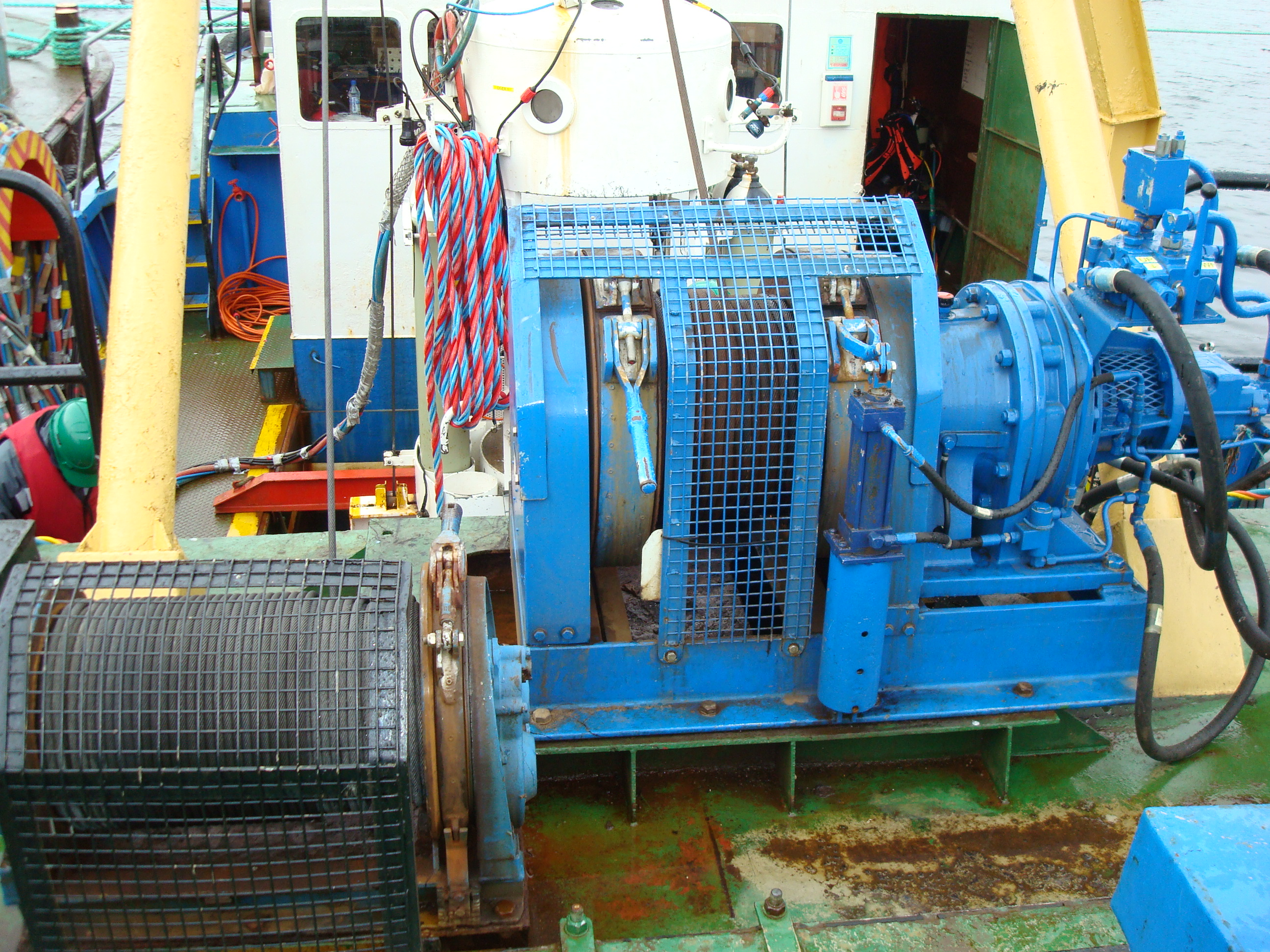
Wet bell hoisting winch

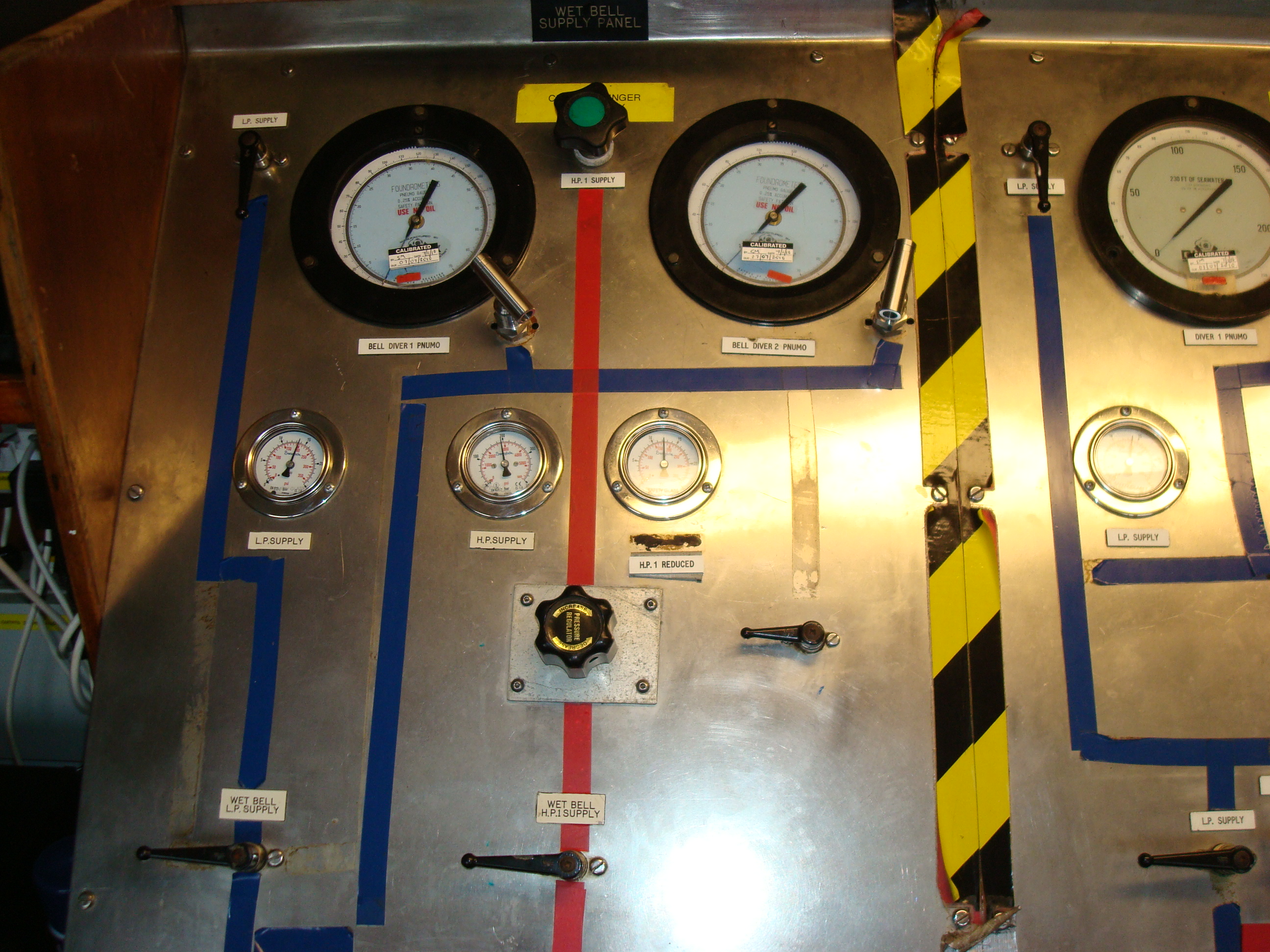
Wet bell supply gas panel (left)

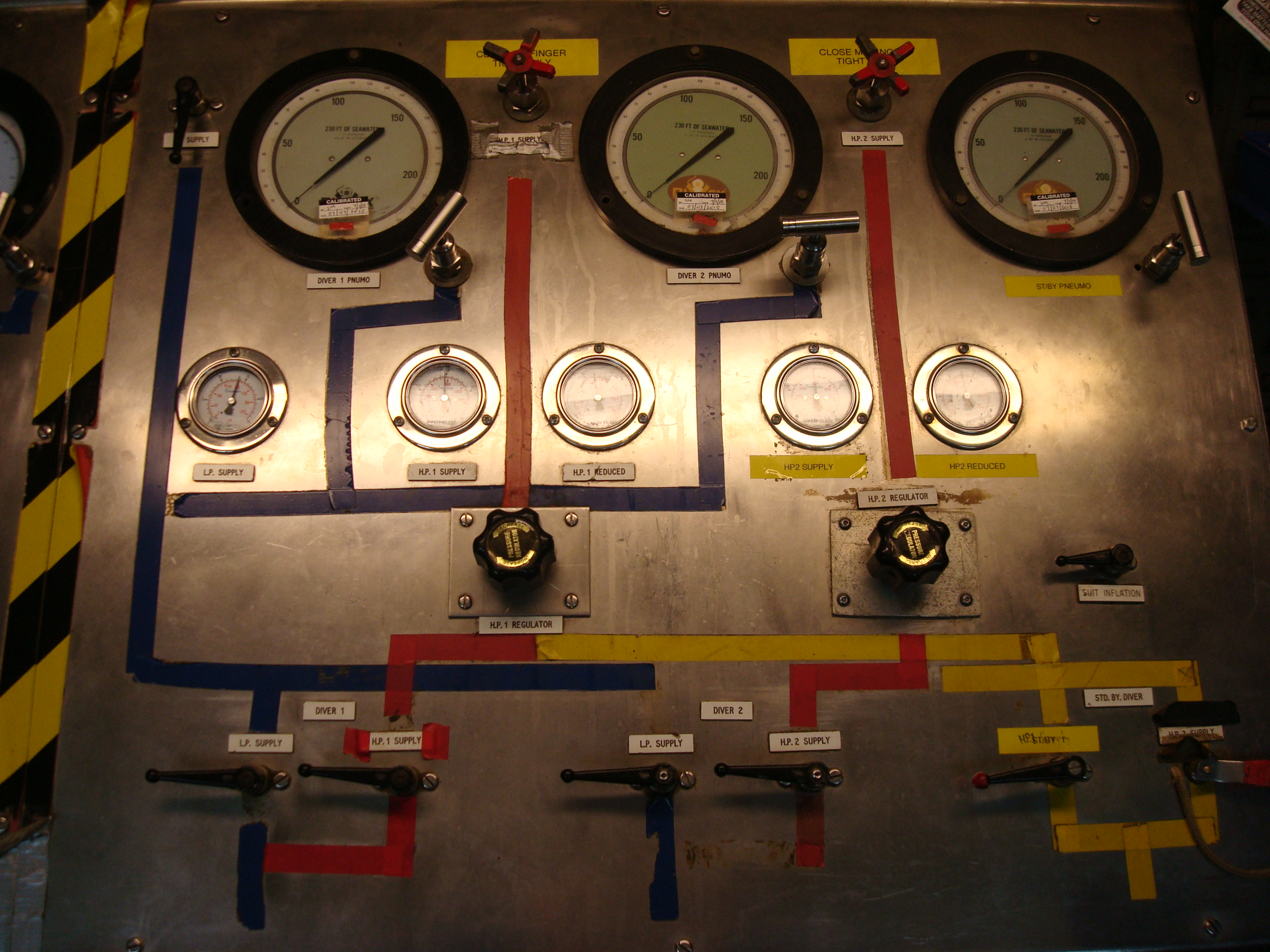
Wet bell supply gas panel (right)

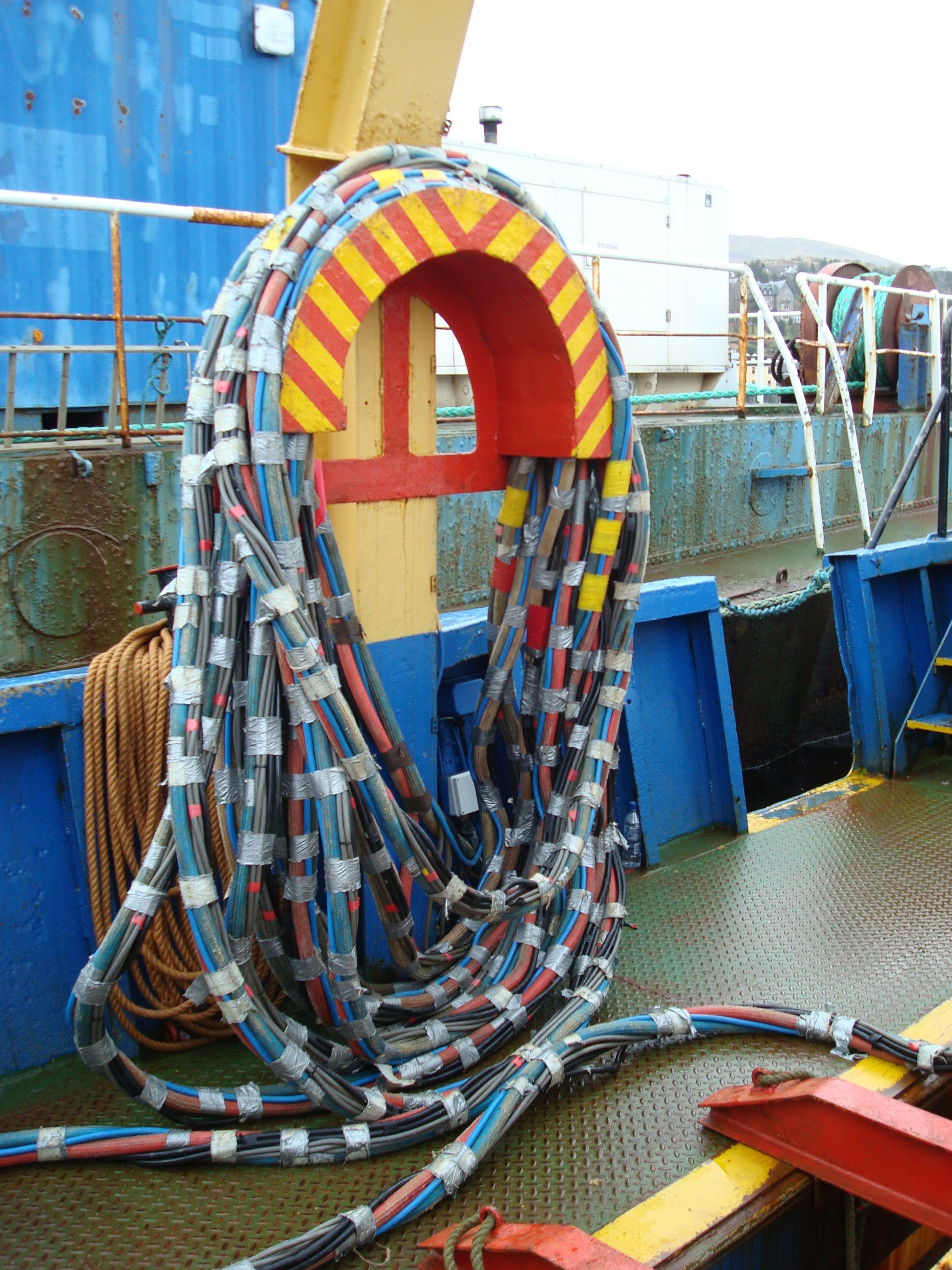
Wet bell umbilical deck storage

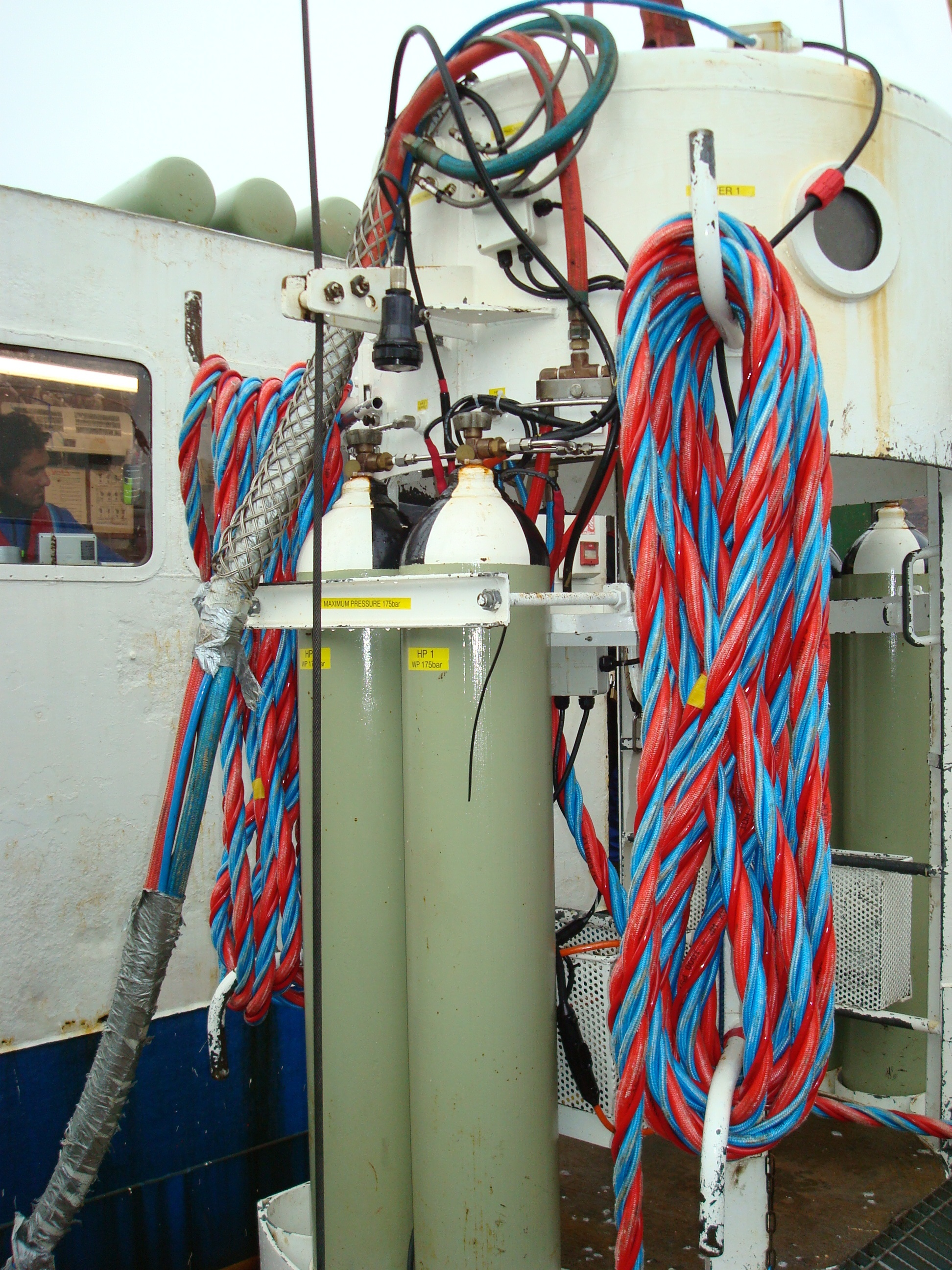
Wet bell bailout gas cylinders

=== Closed bell ===
Schematic of a dry bell with attached bell stage and separate clump weight

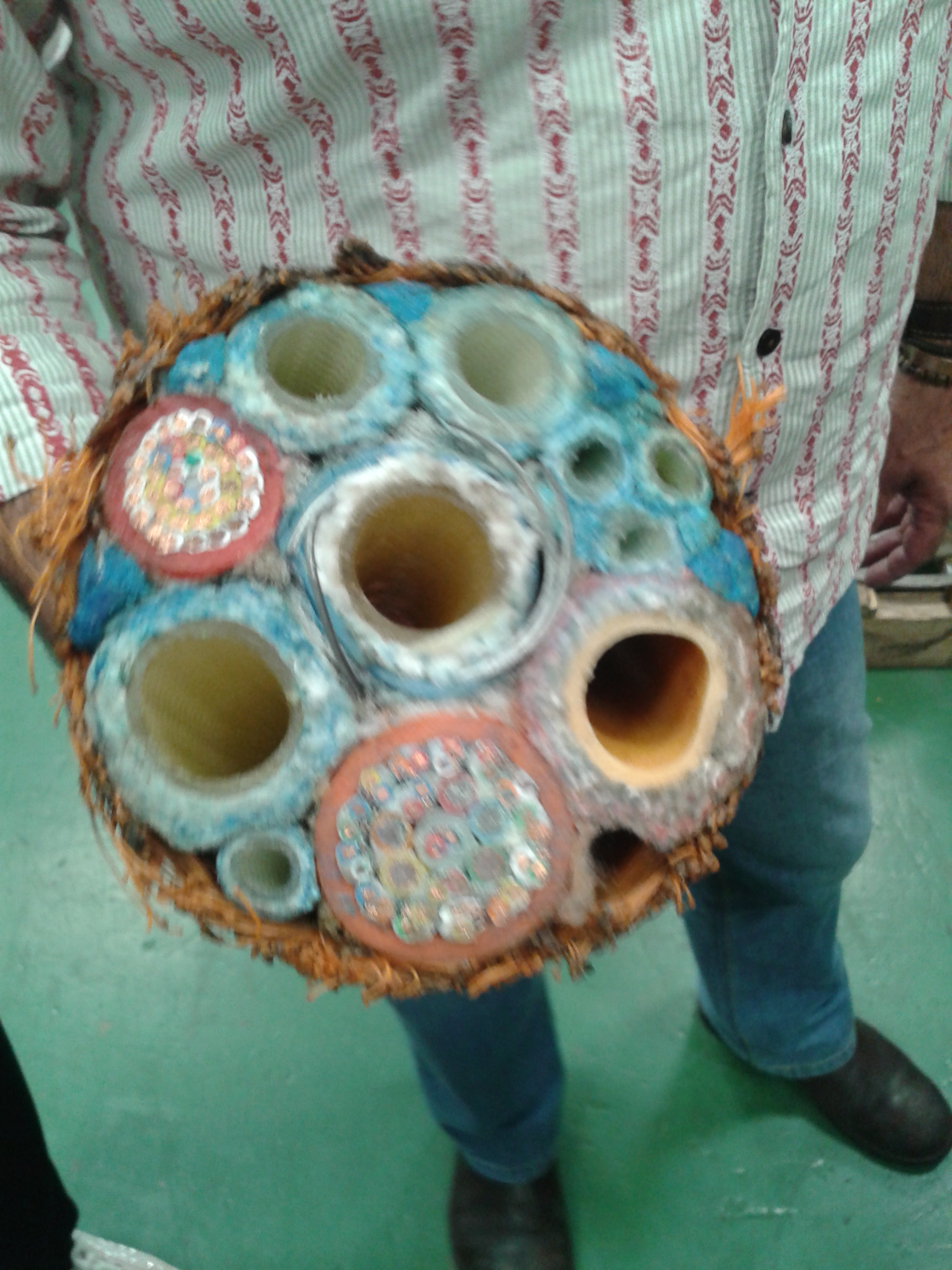
Bell umbilical section

A closed, or dry, bell, also known as a personnel transfer capsule or submersible decompression chamber, is a pressure vessel for human occupancy which is lowered into the sea to the workplace, equalised in pressure to the environment, and opened to allow the divers in and out. These functional requirements dictate the structure and arrangement. The internal pressure requires a strong structure, and a sphere or spherically ended cylinder is most efficient for this purpose. When the bell is underwater, it must be possible for the occupants to get in or out without flooding the interior. This requires a pressure hatch at the bottom. The requirement that the bell reliably retain its internal pressure when the external pressure is lowered dictates that the hatch open inward, so that internal pressure will hold it closed. The bell is lowered through the water to working depth, so must be negatively buoyant. This may require additional ballast, which may be attached by a system that can be released from inside the bell in an emergency, without losing pressure, to allow the bell to float back to the surface.

Locking onto a deck decompression chamber or saturation system at the surface is possible either from the bottom or the side. Using the bell bottom hatch for this purpose has the advantage of only needing one hatch, and the disadvantage of having to lift the bell up and place it over a vertical entry to the chamber. A bell used in this way may be called a personnel transfer capsule. If decompression is done inside the bell, it may be referred to as a submersible decompression chamber.

The bell bottom hatch must be wide enough for a large diver fully kitted with appropriate bailout cylinders, to get in and out without undue difficulty, and it can not be closed while the diver is outside as the umbilical is tended through the hatch by the bellman. It must also be possible for the bellman to lift the working diver in through the hatch if he is unconscious, and close the hatch after him, so that the bell can be sealed and pressurised for the ascent. A lifting tackle is usually fitted inside the bell for this purpose, and the bell may be partially flooded to assist the procedure.

The internal space must be large enough for a fully kitted diver and bellman (the stand-by diver responsible for manning the bell while the working diver is locked out) to sit, and for their umbilicals to be stowed neatly on racks, and the hatch to be opened inwards while they are inside. Anything bigger will make the bell heavier than it really needs to be, so all equipment that does not need to be inside is mounted outside. This includes a framework to support the ancillary equipment and protect the bell from impact and snagging on obstacles, and the emergency gas and power supplies, which are usually racked around the framework. The emergency gas supply (EGS) is connected to the internal gas panel. The part of the framework that keeps the lower hatch off the bottom is called the bell stage. It may be removable, which can facilitate connection to a vertical access chamber lock. The bell umbilical is connected to the bell via through hull fittings (hull penetrations), which must withstand all operating pressures without leaking. The internal gas panel connects to the hull penetrations and the diver's umbilicals. The umbilicals will carry main breathing gas supply, a communications cable, a pneumofathometer hose, hot water supply for suit heating, power for helmet mounted lights, and possibly gas reclaim hose and video cable. The bell umbilical will usually also carry a power cable for internal and external bell lighting. Hydraulic power lines for tools do not have to pass into the interior of the bell as they will never be used there, and tools can also be stored outside. There may be an emergency through-water communications system with a battery power supply, and a location transponder working on the international standard 37.5 kHz. The bell may also have viewports and a medical lock.

A closed bell may be fitted with an umbilical cutter, a mechanism which allows the occupants to sever the bell umbilical from inside the sealed and pressurised bell in the event of an umbilical snag that prevents bell recovery. The device is typically hydraulically operated using a hand pump inside the bell, and can shear the umbilical at or just above the point where it is fastened to the top of the bell. Once cut, the bell can be raised and if the umbilical can then be recovered, it can be reconnected with only a short length lost. An external connection known as a hot stab unit which allows an emergency umbilical to be connected by a ROV or diver to maintain life support in the bell during a rescue operation may be fitted. Hot water, breathing gas, electrical power and communications connections are likely to be provided.

The divers in the bell can be monitored from the diving control point by closed circuit video, and the bell atmosphere can be monitored for volatile hydrocarbon contamination by a hyperbaric hydrocarbon analyser which can be linked to a topside repeater and set to give an alarm if the hydrocarbon levels exceed 10% of the anaesthetic level.

The bell may be fitted with an external emergency battery power pack, carbon dioxide scrubber for the internal atmosphere, and air conditioner for temperature control. Power supply is typically 12 or 24V DC.

The bell may be provided with ballast to give it negative buoyancy so that it will sink when lowered by the winch. It may be possible to release the ballast from inside the sealed bell for an emergency buoyant ascent in the event of a lifting winch failure. One such system allows the ballast to be lowered enough to allow the bell to rise two metres, giving more clearance to access the bottom hatch. After entering and sealing the bell, the occupants can complete the release, making the bell buoyant so it can float to the surface.

A bell will be provided with equipment to rescue and treat an injured diver. This will normally include a small tackle to lift the disabled diver into the bell through the bottom hatch and secure them in an upright position if needed. A bell flooding valve, also known as a flood-up valve may be available to partially flood the interior to aid in lifting a disabled diver into the bell. Once inside and secure, the bell is cleared of water using the blow-down valve to fill the interior with breathing gas at ambient pressure and displace the water out through the hatch. A first aid kit will be carried.

==== British mini-bell system ====
A variant of this system used in the North Sea oilfields between early 1986 and the early 90s was the Oceantech Minibell system, which was used for bell-bounce dives, and was operated as an open bell for the descent, and as a closed bell for the ascent. The divers would climb into the bell after stowing their umbilicals on outside racks, remove their helmets for outside storage, seal the bell, and return to the surface, venting to the depth of the first decompression stop. The bell would then be locked onto a deck decompression chamber, the divers transferred under pressure to complete decompression in the chamber, and the bell would be available for use for another dive.

=== Breathing gas distribution ===
Breathing gas supplies for the bell comprise a primary gas supply, a reserve gas supply and an emergency gas supply carried on the bell. The divers will also carry bailout gas in scuba cylinders, or as a semi-closed circuit rebreather, sufficient to get them back to the bell in the event of an umbilical supply failure.

Primary gas, or main gas supply may be compressed air, which is usually supplied by a low pressure breathing air compressor, or mixed gas, which is usually provided in manifolded clusters of high-pressure storage cylinders, commonly referred to as "quads". Primary gas is connected to the main gas panel throughout the diving operation except when it fails or a problem is being corrected, during which time the divers are switched over to reserve gas.

Reserve gas, or secondary gas, which is connected to the main gas panel and available for immediate use by opening the supply valve, may also be supplied by low pressure compressor, or from high pressure storage. It has the same composition as the main gas supply.

Decompression gas, when used, is also supplied via the main gas panel. It may be the same gas as the primary gas, or an oxygen enriched mixture, or pure oxygen. Gas switching for in-water decompression in a wet bell is not the preferred procedure for commercial diving, as the entire breathing gas delivery system must be oxygen clean, and as a decompression chamber is required on site when a specified limit of obligatory decompression is planned, it is more convenient to do surface decompression on oxygen (SurDO_{2}) in the chamber. The relative safety of surface decompression and in-water decompression is uncertain. Both procedures are accepted by health and safety regulatory bodies.

Emergency gas is carried on the bell, usually in a small number of 50 litre high-pressure cylinders connected to the bell gas panel. This should be the same gas as the primary gas. On closed bells there is an additional supply of pure oxygen if the bell has a carbon dioxide scrubber for the bell atmosphere. On a type 2 wet bell or a closed bell this emergency gas can be distributed to the divers from the bell gas panel operated by the bellman, through the excursion umbilicals.

Each diver carries an emergency gas supply (bailout gas) sufficient to get back to the bell under any reasonably foreseeable circumstances of umbilical supply failure of primary, reserve, and bell emergency gas supplies.

The main gas distribution panel is located at the control point for the diving operation, and operated by the gas man, who may also be a diver, or if the gas is air, it may be directly operated by the diving supervisor.

==== Bell gas panel ====
The bell gas panel is a manifold of valves, pressure regulators, pipes, hoses and gauges mounted inside a closed bell, and under the canopy of a type 2 wet bell, and is operated by the bellman. When a helium reclaim system is in use, the return hose for the reclaimed gas passes through the bell gas panel and a back-pressure regulator on its way to the surface. The bell gas panel is supplied with primary and secondary gas supplies from the main gas panel through the bell umbilical, and with on-board emergency gas from the cylinders carried on the bell. Pressure of each gas supply is shown by a gauge on the panel before and after regulation.

=== Deployment of a modern diving bell ===
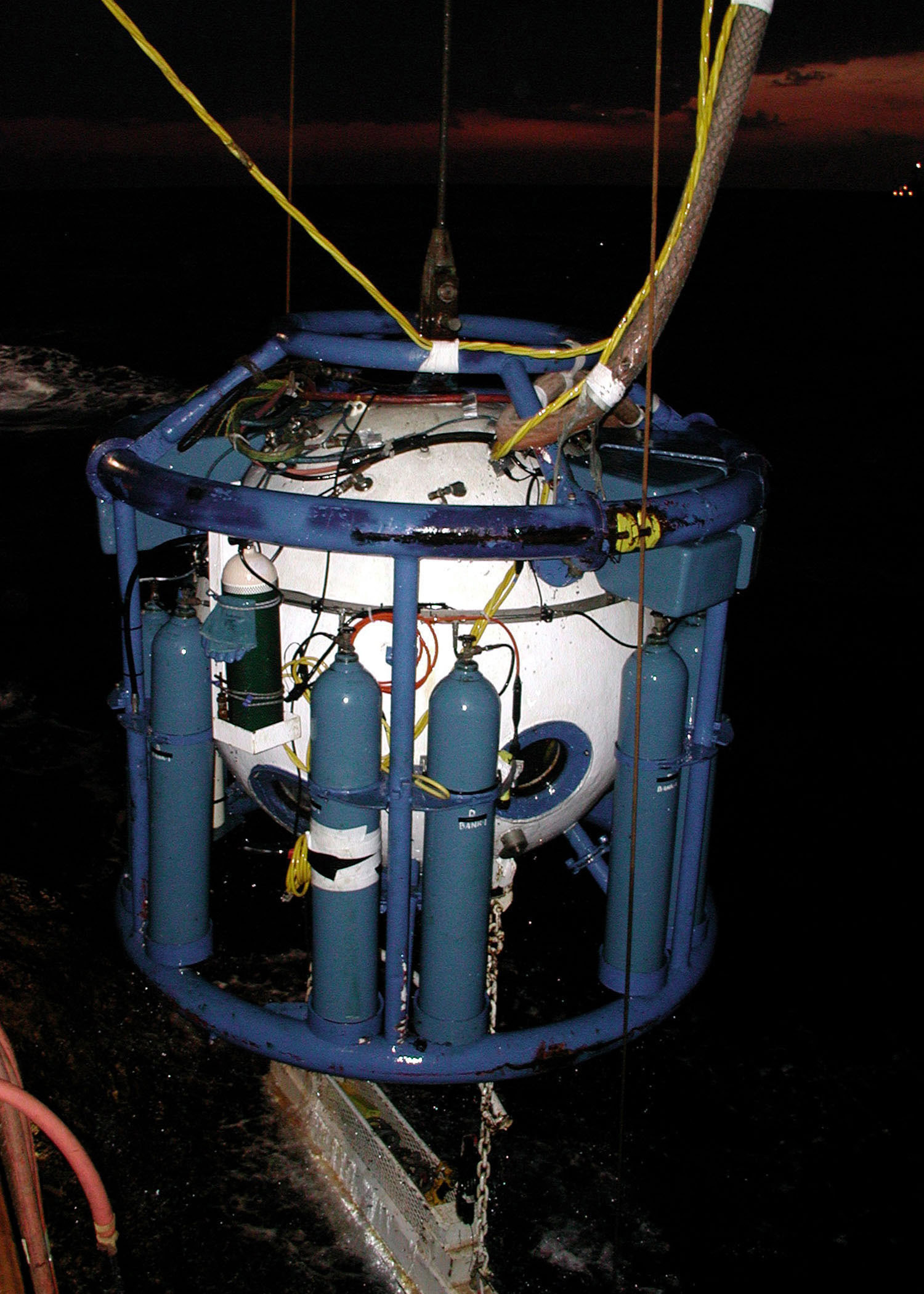
Personnel Transfer Capsule – closed diving bell

Diving bells are deployed over the side of the vessel or platform, or through a moonpool, using a gantry or A-frame from which the clump weight and the bell are suspended. On dive support vessels with in-built saturation systems the bell may be deployed through a moon pool. The bell handling system is also known as the launch and recovery system (LARS).

==== Bell handling system ====
A closed bell handling system is used to move the bell from the position where it is locked on to the chamber system into the water, lower it to the working depth and hold it in position without excessive movement, and recover it to the chamber system. The system used to transfer the bell on deck may be a deck trolley system, an overhead gantry or a swinging A-frame. The system must constrain movement of the supported bell sufficiently to allow accurate location on the chamber trunking even in bad weather. A bell cursor may be used to control movement through and above the splash zone, and heave compensation gear may be used to limit vertical movement when in the water and clear of the cursor, particularly at working depth when the diver may be locked out and the bell is open to ambient pressure.

==== Bell umbilical ====
The bell umbilical supplies gas to the bell gas panel, and is separate from the divers' excursion umbilicals, which are connected to the gas panel on the inside of the bell. The bell umbilical is deployed from a large drum or umbilical basket and care is taken to keep the tension in the umbilical low but sufficient to remain near vertical in use and to roll up neatly during recovery, as this reduces the risk of the umbilical snagging on underwater obstructions.

Wet bell handling differs from closed bell handling in that there is no requirement to transfer the bell to and from the chamber system to make a pressure-tight connection, and that a wet bell will be required to maintain a finely controlled speed of descent and ascent and remain at a fixed depth within fairly close tolerances for the occupants to decompress at a specific ambient pressure, whereas a closed bell can be removed from the water without delay and the speed of ascent and descent is not critical.

A bell diving team will usually include two divers in the bell, designated as the working diver and bellman, though they may alternate these roles during the dive. The bellman is a stand-by diver and umbilical tender from the bell to the working diver, the operator of the on-board gas distribution panel, and has an umbilical about 2 m longer than the working diver to ensure that the working diver can be reached in an emergency. This can be adjusted by tying off the umbilicals inside the bell to limit deployment length, which must often be done in any case, to prevent the divers from approaching known hazards in the water. Depending on circumstances, there may also be a surface stand-by diver, with attendant, in case there is an emergency where a surface oriented diver could assist. The team will be under the direct control of the diving supervisor, will include a winch operator, and may include a dedicated surface gas panel operator.

==== Clump weight ====
Deployment of a diving bell usually starts by lowering the clump weight, which is a large ballast weight suspended in the bight of a cable which runs from a winch, over a sheave on one side of the gantry, down to the weight, round a pair of sheaves on the sides of the weight, and back up to the other side of the gantry, where it is fastened. The weight hangs freely between the two parts of the cable, and due to its weight, hangs horizontally and keeps the cable under tension. The bell hangs between the parts of the clump weight cable, and has a fairlead on each side which slides along the cable as it is lowered or lifted. Deployment of the bell is by a separate cable attached to the top, which runs over a sheave in the middle of the gantry. As the bell is lowered, the fairleads prevent it from rotating on the deployment cable, which would put twist into the umbilical and risk loops or snagging. The clump weight cables therefore act as guidelines or rails along which the bell is lowered to the workplace, and raised back to the platform. If the lifting winch or cable fails, and the bell ballast is released, a positively buoyant bell can float up and the cables will guide it to the surface to a position where it can be recovered relatively easily. The clump weight cable can also be used as an emergency recovery system, in which case both bell and weight are lifted together. An alternative system for preventing rotation on the lifting cable is the use of a cross-haul system, which may also be used as a means of adjusting the lateral position of the bell at working depth, and as an emergency recovery system.

==== Bell stage ====
A bell stage is an open framework below the bell which prevents the bell lower lock from getting too close to the clump weight or seabed, ensuring that there is space for the divers to safely exit and enter the bell. This can be deployed either as part of the bell, or as part of the clump weight. The bell stage may be fitted with baskets for carrying tools and equipment.

==== Bell cursor ====
A bell cursor is a device used to guide and control the motion of the bell through the air and the splash zone near the surface, where waves can move the bell significantly, to and from a depth where the water motion is less energetic. It can either be a passive system which relies on additional ballast weight or an active system which uses a controlled drive system to provide vertical motion. The cursor has a cradle which locks onto the bell and which moves vertically on rails to constrain lateral movement. The bell is released and locked onto the cursor in the relatively still water below the splash zone.

==== Moon pool aeration system ====
On some diving support vessels the moon pool is provided with an aeration system which blows large volumes of low pressure air into the water of the moon pool through submerged nozzles. This converts the water to two-phase foam of lower density than the water, which exerts less force on the bell when it passes between the air above and the unaerated water below the interface. The density change is relatively gradual, and water motion of waves and vortices in the aerated zone is attenuated, so shock loads are significantly reduced.

==== Heave compensation ====
Heave compensation equipment is used to stabilise the depth of the bell by counteracting vertical movement of the handling system caused by movements of the platform, and usually also maintains correct tension on the guide wires. It is not usually essential, depending on the stability of the platform.

==== Cross-hauling ====
Bell cross-hauling is the use of a cable connected to the bell to move the bell laterally when this is useful, such as when the workplace is not close to directly below the LARS. Cross-hauling systems are cables from an independent lifting device, and may also be used to limit rotation and as an emergency bell recovery system.

== Use with hyperbaric chambers ==
Commercial diving contractors generally use a closed bell in conjunction with a surface hyperbaric chamber. These have safety and ergonomic advantages and allow decompression to be carried out after the bell has been raised to the surface and back on board the diving support vessel. Closed bells are often used in saturation diving and undersea rescue operations. The diving bell would be connected via the mating flange of an airlock to the deck decompression chamber or saturation system for transfer under pressure of the occupants. A hyperbaric bell run is defined as the period between locking the bell off the system with one or more divers under pressure inside and locking back on again.

== Air-lock diving bells ==
An air-lock bell is a type of caisson with an access trunk that extends above the water surface, with an air-lock for access.

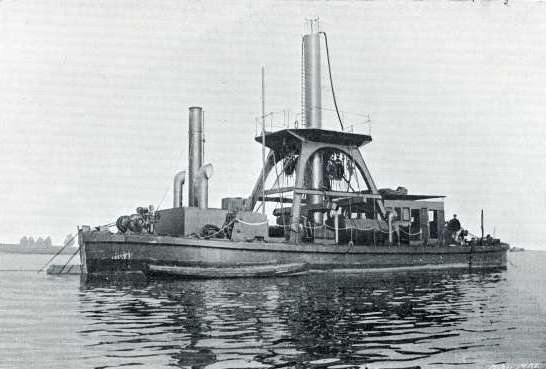
Barge with air-lock diving bell for working on moorings

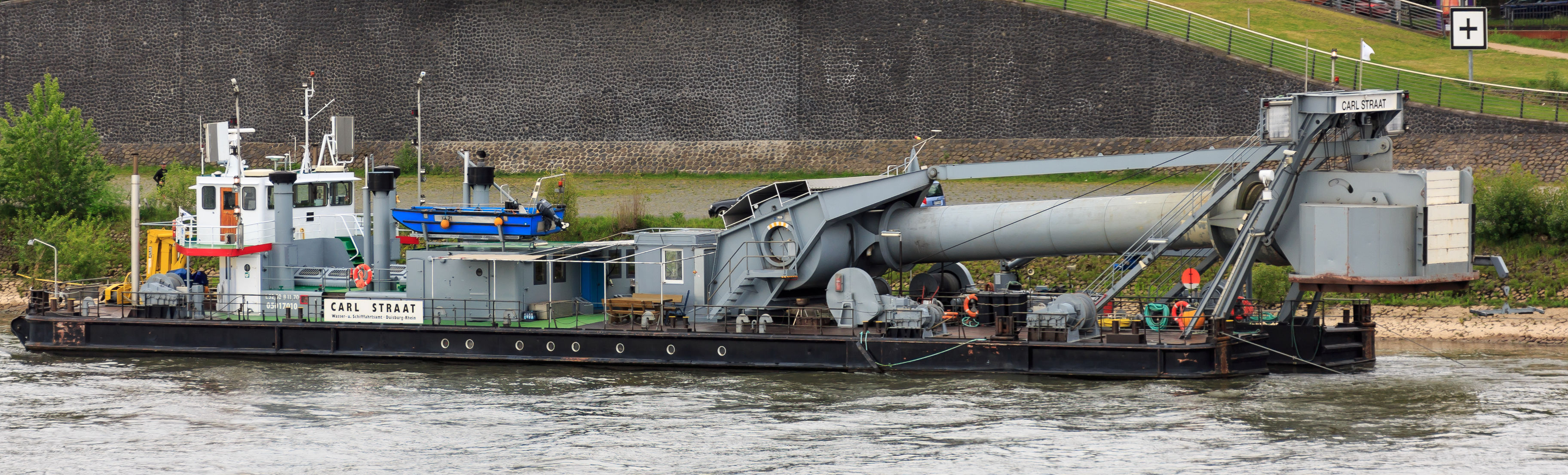
Service vessel with diving bell which can be lowered to 10 m and accessed via airlock and a 2 m diameter access tube

The air lock diving-bell plant was a purpose-built barge for the laying, examination and repair of moorings for battleships at Gibraltar harbour. It was designed by Siebe Gorman of Lambeth and Forrestt & Co. Ltd of Wivenhoe in Essex, who built and supplied it in 1902 to the British Admiralty.

The vessel came about from the specific conditions at Gibraltar. The heavy harbour moorings have three chains extending out radially along the seabed from a central ring, each terminating in a large anchor. Most harbours have a soft seabed, and it is usual to lay down moorings by settling anchors in the mud, clay or sand but this could not be done in Gibraltar harbour, where the seabed is hard rock.

In operation the barge would be towed over the work site, moored in place with anchors, and the bell would be lowered vertically to the bottom. and the water displaced by pumping. The work teams entered the bell through an airlock in the central access shaft. Working in ordinary clothes they could dig out anchorings for the moorings.

The German service barge Carl Straat is similar in concept, but the bell is lowered by swinging the access tube. Carl Straat was built in 1963 for the Waterways and Shipping Directorate West in Münster. The 6 m × 4 m × 2.5 m bell is accessible through a 2 m diameter tube and an airlock. A pantograph system keeps the bell and internal stairs level at all depths. Maximum working depth is 10 m. The vessel is used on those inland waterways which have locks large enough to accommodate its 52 m length overall, 11.8 m beam and 1.6 m draft.

== Rescue bell ==
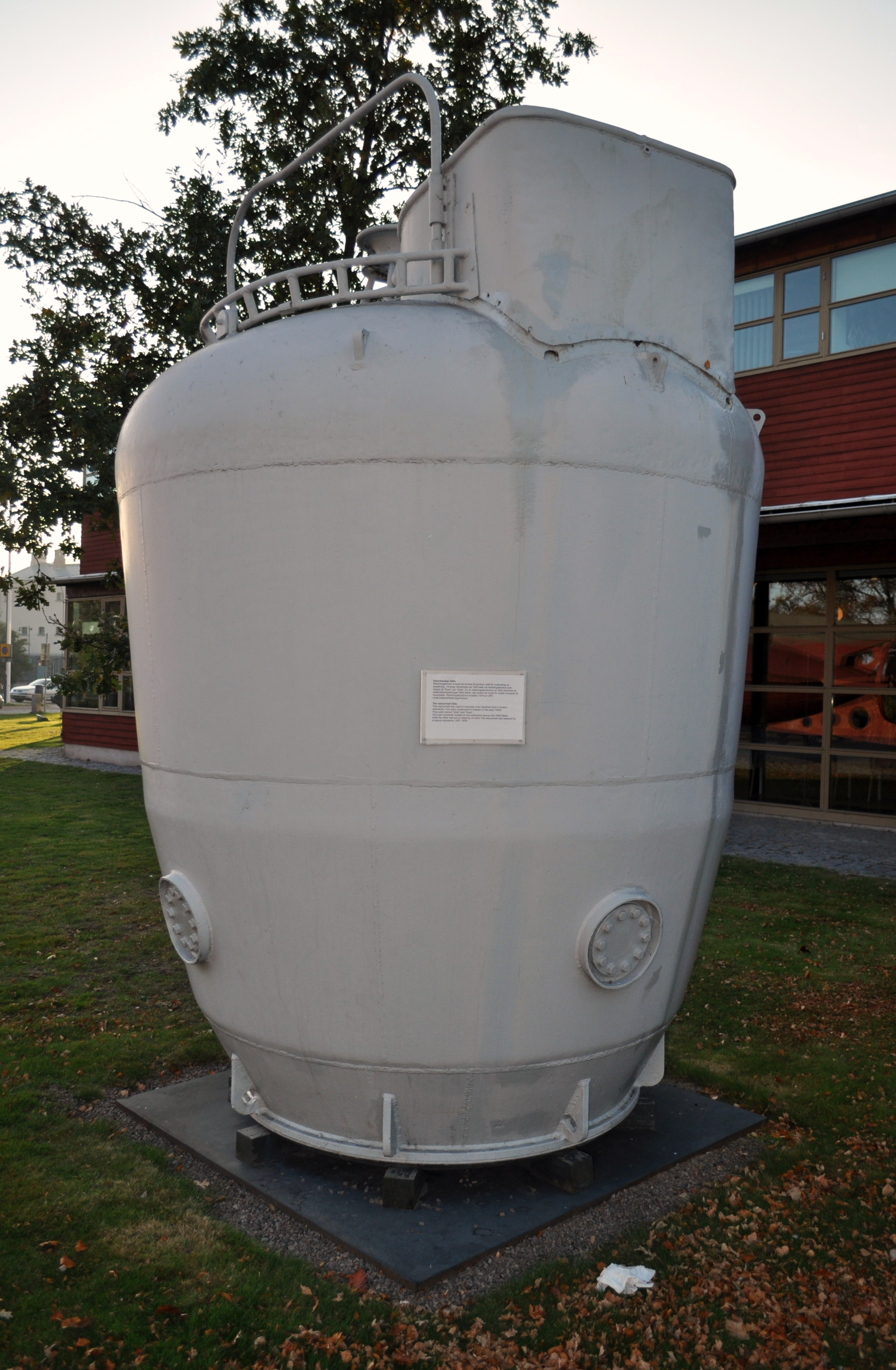
A Swedish Navy submarine rescue diving bell from the early 1940s

Diving bells have been used for submarine rescue. The closed, dry bell is designed to seal against the deck of the submarine above an escape hatch. Water in the space between the bell and the submarine is pumped out, and the pressure difference holds the bell against the submarine, so the hatches can be opened to allow occupants to leave the submarine and enter the bell. The hatches are then closed, the bell skirt flooded to release it from the submarine, and the bell with its load of survivors is hoisted back to the surface, where the survivors exit and the bell may return for the next group. The internal pressure in the bell is usually kept at atmospheric pressure to minimise run time by eliminating the need for decompression, so the seal between the bell skirt and the submarine deck is critical to the safety of the operation. This seal is provided by using a flexible sealing material, usually a type of rubber, which is pressed firmly against the smooth hatch surround by the pressure differential when the skirt is pumped out.

== Observation bell ==
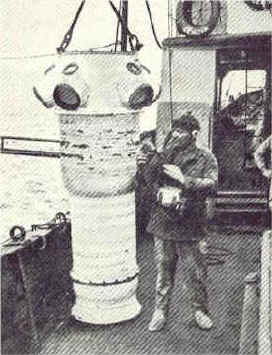
The torretta butoscopica closed observation bell use on the salvage of the SS Egypt

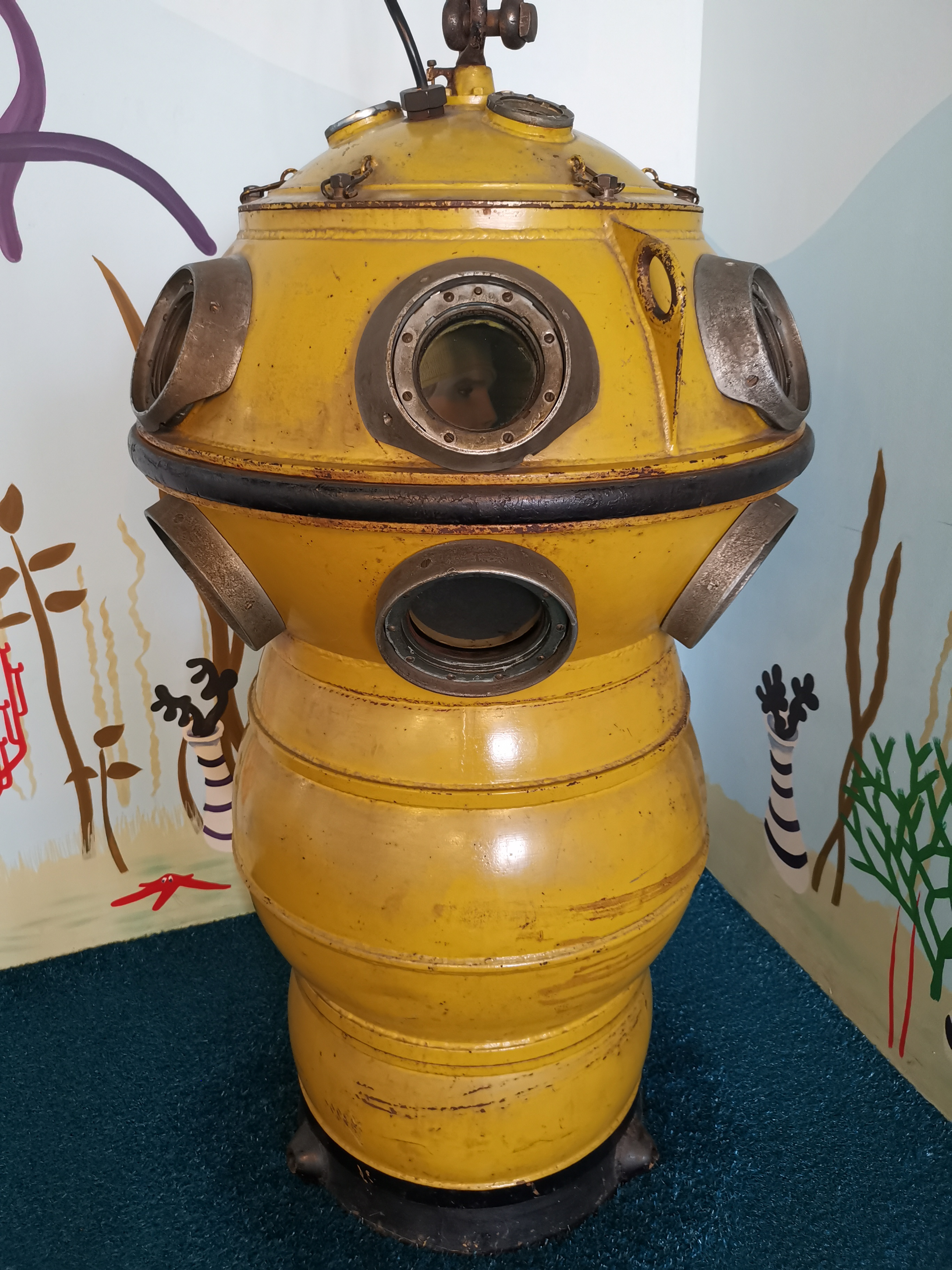
Closed observation bell in a museum at Cuxhaven

An observation bell is a closed bell, generally operated with internal pressure at atmospheric pressure, which provides an observation platform that can be lowered to depth with one or more occupants who can observe the environment through viewports, but are generally not provided with a means of interacting physically with the outside environment. The first observation bell was one of the first modern bells constructed in the late 19th century.

The bathysphere and observation bell are similar structures. A steel bathysphere created in 1930 by William Beebe and Otis Barton had three crystal glass windows made for observation. Observation bells for shallower depths generally use different designs to bathyspheres.

== Bell diving skills and procedures ==
Routine procedures for bell diving include preparation of the bell for the dive, descent and ascent, and monitoring of the working diver by the bellman. The bellman is responsible for ensuring that the bell and its occupants are ready for descent or ascent, and for communications with the surface for tenting the working diver's umbilical and for operation of the bell gas panel.

A wet bell ascent usually includes decompression stops in the water, and sometimes surface decompression.

Closed bell procedures also include locking in and locking out at depth, and transfer under pressure between bell and the saturation system or a deck decompression chamber.

Emergency bell procedures include dynamic positioning alarm and runout response, emergency bell gas panel operations, such as surface gas supply failure or contaminated surface gas supply, both of which require bailout to onboard gas, hot water supply failure, and rescue of the working diver by the bellman. Voice communications failure requires appropriate use of emergency light and gas signals. Bell abandonment may be necessary if a wet bell cannot be raised, but saturation divers in a closed bell must be rescued in the bell or to another bell as they cannot be surfaced in-water.

== Hazards ==
A closed bell that has been depressurised for maintenance access will probably retain residual diving breathing gas mixture, which will usually be hypoxic at normal atmospheric pressure, and could cause anyone who enters to lose consciousness quite rapidly. Helium based mixtures are buoyant and require active flushing with a strong flow of air, followed by testing for oxygen partial pressure before entry.

The bell atmosphere can be contaminated by materials brought in by a diver who was exposed to the contaminants during the lock-out. These will depend on the working environment, and may include petrochemicals. This is a greater problem with closed bells.

Like other pressure vessels for human occupancy, a fire inside a diving bell can be extremely dangerous to occupants. This is primarily a problem in closed bells, as occupants of open bells can generally immerse themselves in water and flood the bell to quickly extinguish a fire, and the interior is generally wet and not easy to ignite. Partial pressure of oxygen in the bell is generally limited to prevent oxygen toxicity and this is also a defence against ignition. In saturation diving the bell atmosphere and breathing gas supply is generally the same as the accommodations atmosphere, which is carefully monitored and kept at a safe oxygen partial pressure for oxygen toxicity, which has an inherently low fire risk.

== Diver training ==
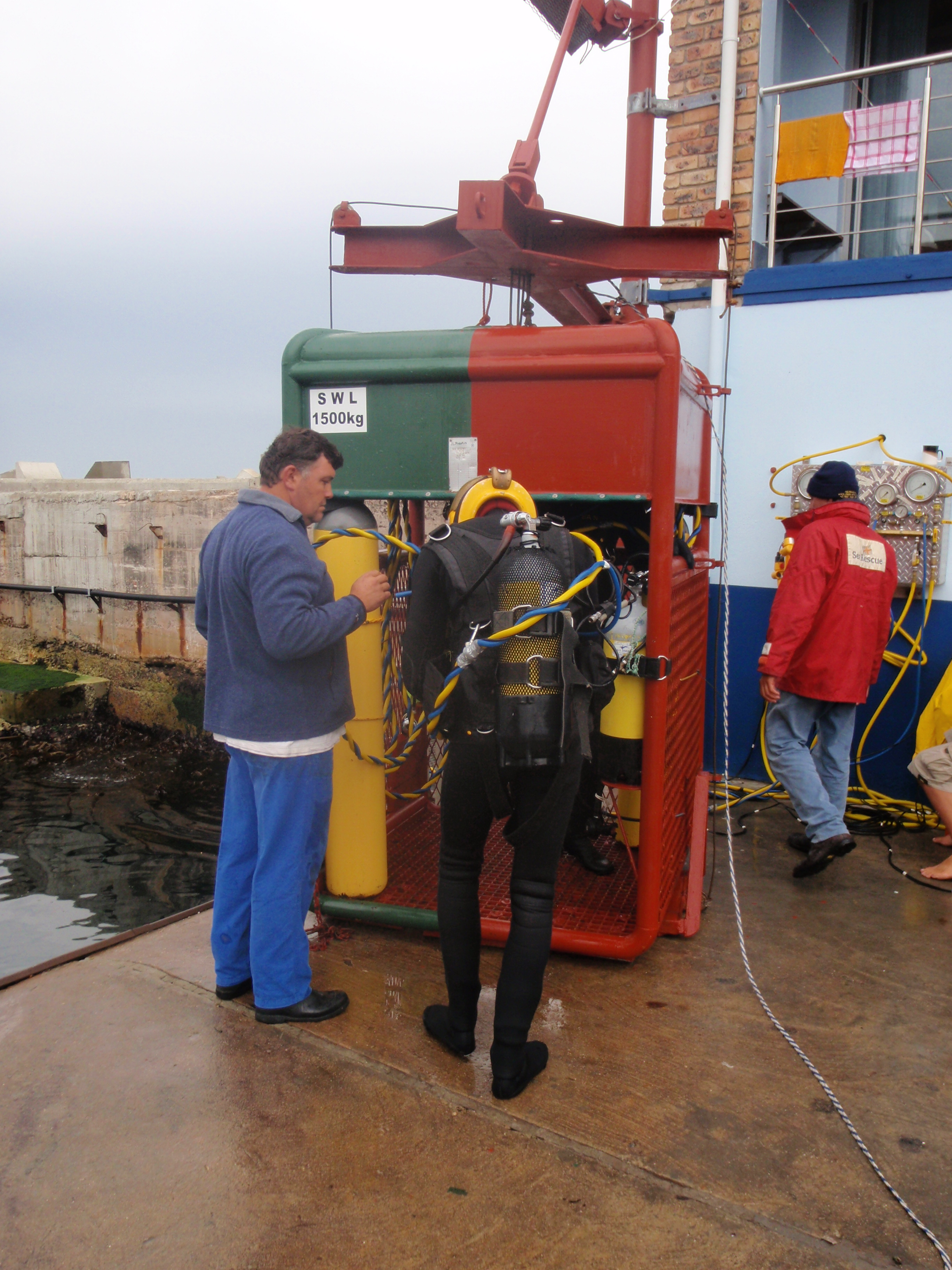
Diver training using a wet bell

Divers qualified to work from bells are trained in the skills and procedures relevant to the type of bell they will be expected to work from. Open bells are generally used for surface oriented surface-supplied deep air diving, and closed bells are used for saturation diving and surface oriented mixed gas diving. These skills include the standard procedures for the deployment of the working diver from the bell, the tending of the working diver from the bell by the bellman, and the emergency and rescue procedures for both working diver and bellman. There is considerable similarity and significant differences in these procedures between open and closed bell diving.

== Underwater habitats ==
As noted above, further extension of the wet bell concept is the moon-pool-equipped underwater habitat, where divers may spend long periods in dry comfort while acclimated to the increased pressure experienced underwater. By not needing to return to the surface between excursions into the water, they can reduce the necessity for decompression (gradual reduction of pressure), after each excursion, required to avoid problems with nitrogen bubbles releasing from the bloodstream (the bends, also known as caisson disease). Such problems can occur at pressures greater than 1.6 standard atmospheres (160 kPa), corresponding to a depth of 6 metres (20 ft) of water. Divers in an ambient pressure habitat will require decompression when they return to the surface. This is a form of saturation diving.

== In nature ==
The diving bell spider, Argyroneta aquatica, is a spider which lives entirely under water, even though it could survive on land.

Since the spider must breathe air, it constructs from silk a habitat like an open diving bell which it attaches to an underwater plant. The spider collects air in a thin layer around its body, trapped by dense hairs on its abdomen and legs. It transports this air to its diving bell to replenish the air supply in the bell. This allows the spider to remain in the bell for long periods, where it waits for its prey.

== See also ==
- Bathysphere – Unpowered spherical deep-sea observation submersible lowered on a cable
- Benthoscope – Unpowered spherical deep-sea observation submersible lowered on a cable
- Caisson (engineering) – Rigid structure to provide workers with a dry working environment below water level
- Cofferdam – Barrier allowing liquid to be pumped out of an enclosed area
- Diving chamber – Hyperbaric pressure vessel for human occupancy used in diving operations
- Moon pool – Opening in the base of a hull, platform, or chamber giving access to the water below
- Timeline of diving technology – Chronological list of notable events in the history of underwater diving equipment
- Wet submarine – Ambient pressure diver propulsion vehicle
