= Depth gauge =

Instrument that indicates depth below a reference surface

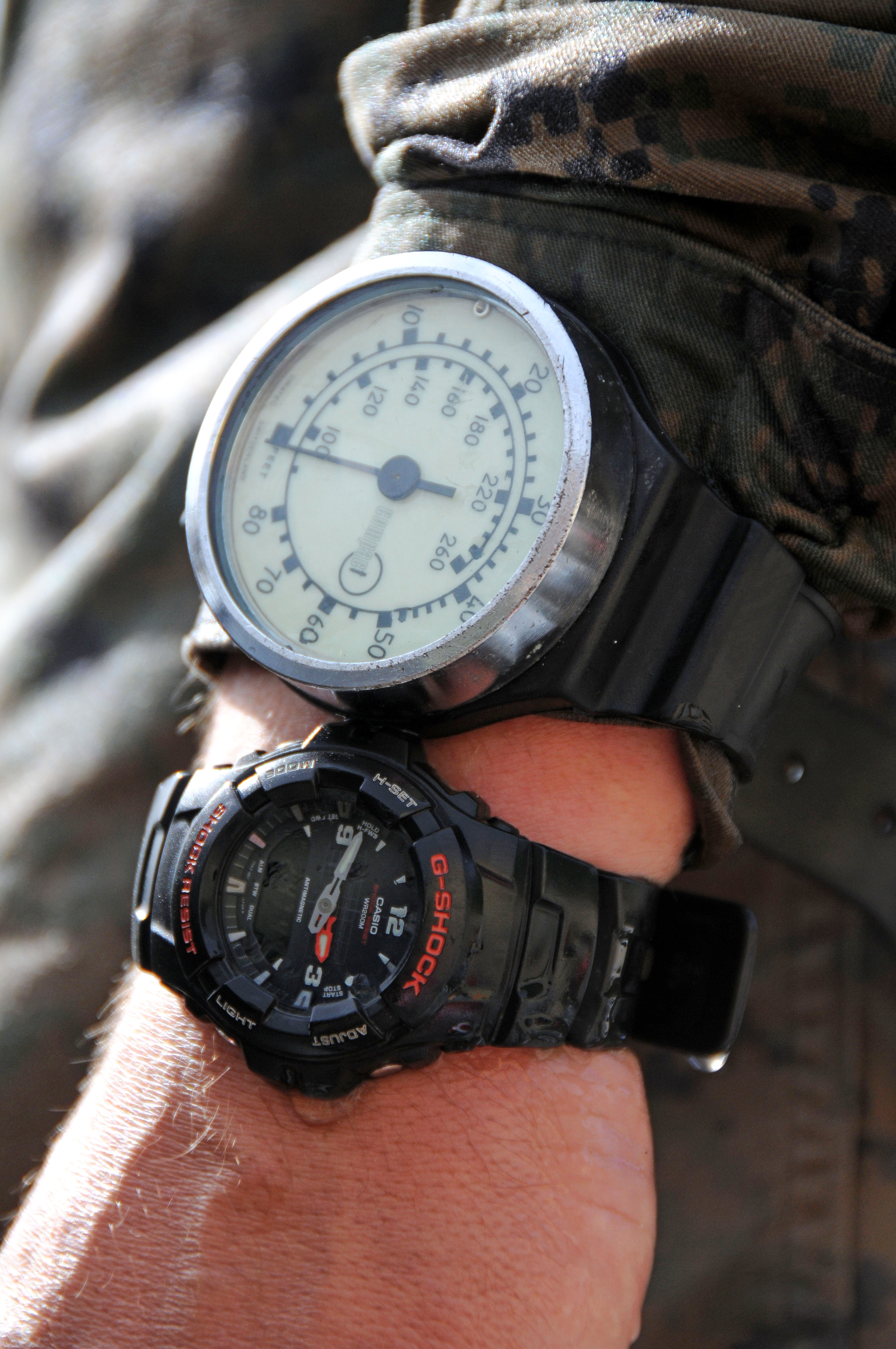
- US Marine diver with a diving watch and an analog depth gauge

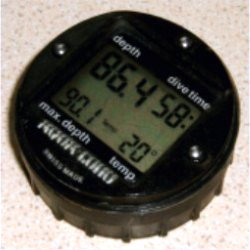
A digital depth gauge combined with a timer and temperature display, also referred to as a "Bottom timer"

A depth gauge is an instrument for measuring depth below a vertical datum or other reference surface. They include depth gauges for underwater diving and similar applications. A diving depth gauge is a pressure gauge that displays the equivalent depth below the free surface in water. The relationship between depth and pressure is linear and accurate enough for most practical purposes, and for many purposes, such as diving, it is actually the pressure that is important. It is a piece of diving equipment used by underwater divers, submarines and submersibles.

Most modern diving depth gauges have an electronic mechanism and digital display. Earlier types used a mechanical mechanism and analogue display. Digital depth gauges used by divers commonly also include a timer showing the interval of time that the diver has been submerged. Some show the diver's rate of ascent and descent, which can be is useful for avoiding barotrauma. This combination instrument is also known as a bottom timer. An electronic depth gauge is an essential component of a dive computer.

As the gauge only measures water pressure, there is an inherent inaccuracy in the depth displayed by gauges that are used in both fresh water and seawater due to the difference in the densities of fresh water and seawater due to salinity and temperature variations.

A depth gauge that measures the pressure of air bubbling out of an open ended hose to the diver is called a pneumofathometer. They are usually calibrated in metres of seawater or feet of seawater.

Other types of depth gauge use a physical probe to measure the vertical distance from the reference surface to the bottom or other relevant point, such as a dipstick, sounding pole or sounding line, or use light or sound emitted from a known distance from the surface and reflected by the bottom to calculate depth based on elapsed time of travel. This includes echo sounding and lidar.

A level sensor is related technology which measures offset of actual surface from a reference surface, bur does not directly measure depth.

== History ==
Experiments in 1659 by Robert Boyle of the Royal Society were made using a barometer underwater, and led to Boyle's law. The French physicist, mathematician and inventor Denis Papin published Recuiel de diverses Pieces touchant quelques novelles Machines in 1695, where he proposed a depth gauge for a submarine. A "sea-gage" for measuring ocean depth was described in Philosophia Britannica in 1747. But it wasn't until 1775 and the development of a depth gauge by the inventor, scientific instrument, and clock maker Isaac Doolittle of New Haven, Connecticut, for David Bushnell's submarine the Turtle, that one was deployed in an underwater craft. By the early nineteenth century, "the depth gauge was a standard feature on diving bells".

== Mode of operation ==
With water depth, the ambient pressure increases 1 bar for every 10 m in fresh water at 4 °C. Therefore, the depth can be determined by measuring the pressure and comparing it to the pressure at the surface. Atmospheric pressure varies with altitude and weather, and for accuracy the depth gauge should be calibrated to correct for local atmospheric pressure. This can be important for decompression safety at altitude. Water density varies with temperature and salinity, so for an accurate depth measurement by this method, the temperature and salinity profiles must be known. These are easily measured, but must be measured directly.

== Types ==
=== Boyle-Mariott depth gauge ===
The Boyle-Mariotte depth gauge consists of a transparent tube open at one end. It has no moving parts, and the tube is commonly part of a circle or a flat spiral to compactly fit onto a support. While diving, water goes into the tube and compresses an air bubble inside proportionally to the depth. The edge of the bubble indicates the depth on a scale. For a depth up to 10 m, this depth gauge is quite accurate, because in this range, the pressure doubles from 1 bar to 2 bar, and so it uses half of the scale. This type of gauge is also known as a capillary gauge. At greater depths, it becomes inaccurate. The maximum depth cannot be recorded with this type of depth gauge, and accuracy is strongly affected by temperature change of the air bubble while immersed.

=== Bourdon tube depth gauge ===
Bourdon tube

The Bourdon tube depth gauge consists of a curved tube made of elastic metal, known as a Bourdon tube. Water pressure on the tube may be on the inside or the outside depending on the design. When the pressure increases, the tube stretches, and when it decreases the tube recovers to the original curvature. This movement is transferred to a pointer by a system of gears or levers, and the pointer may have an auxiliary trailing pointer which is pushed along but does not automatically return with the main pointer, which can mark the maximum depth reached. Accuracy can be good. When carried by the diver, these gauges measure the pressure difference directly between the ambient water and the sealed internal air space of the gauge, and therefore can be influenced by temperature changes.

=== Membrane depth gauge ===
In a membrane depth gauge, the water presses onto a metal canister with a flexible end, which is deflected proportionally to external pressure. Deflection of the membrane is amplified by a lever and gear mechanism and transferred to an indicator pointer like in an aneroid barometer. The pointer may push a trailing pointer which does not return by itself, and indicates the maximum. This type of gauge can be quite accurate when corrected for temperature variations.

Strain gauges may be used to convert the pressure on a membrane to electrical resistance, which can be converted to an analog signal by a Wheatstone bridge This signal can be processed to provide a signal proportional to pressure, which may be digitised for further processing and display.

=== Piezoresistive pressure sensors ===
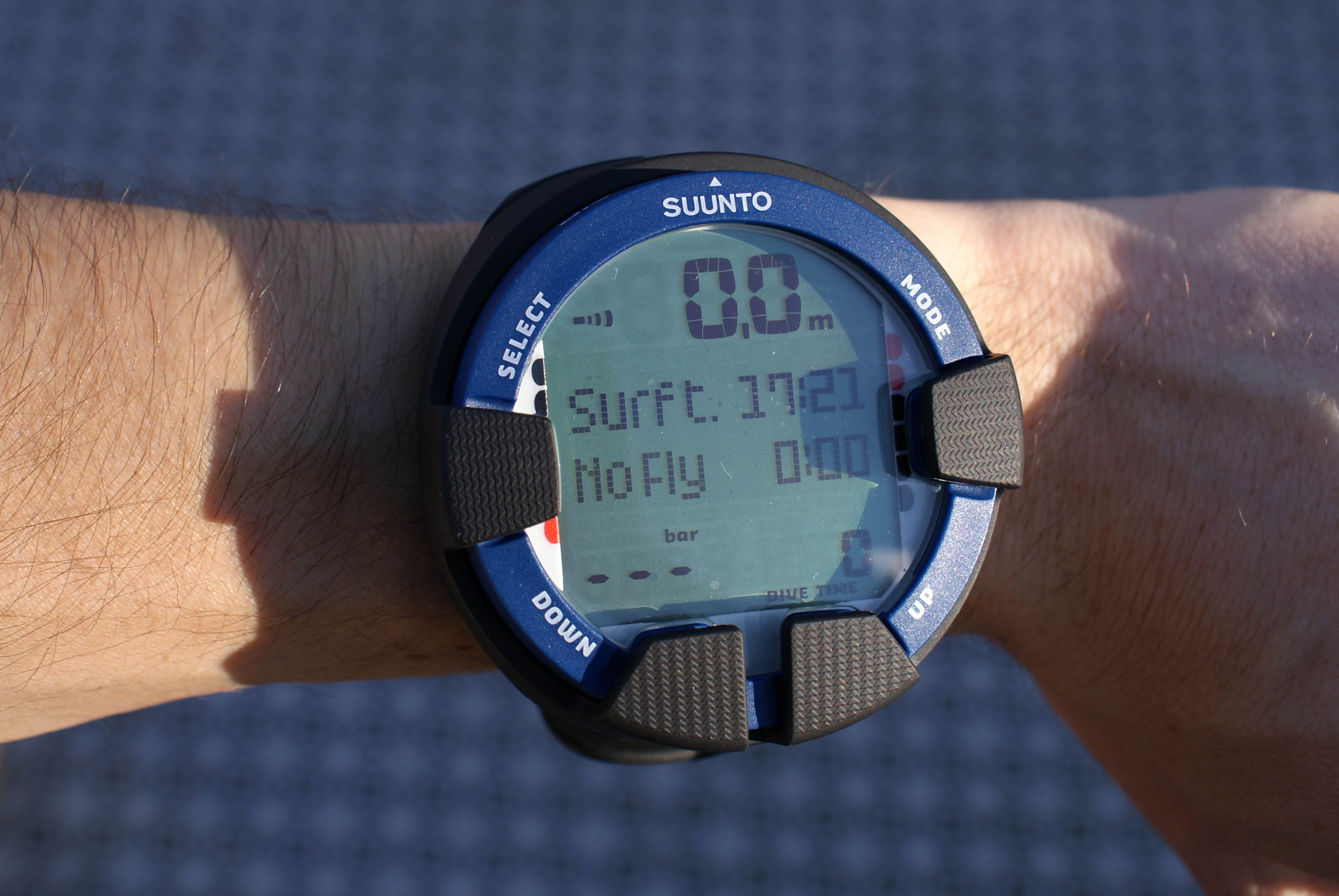
Dive computer showing depth display

Piezoresistive pressure sensors use the variation of resistivity of silicon with stress. A piezoresistive sensor consists of a silicon diaphragm on which silicon resistors are diffused during the manufacturing process. The diaphragm is bonded to a silicon wafer. The signal must be corrected for temperature variations. These pressure sensors are commonly used in dive computers.

=== Pneumofathometer ===
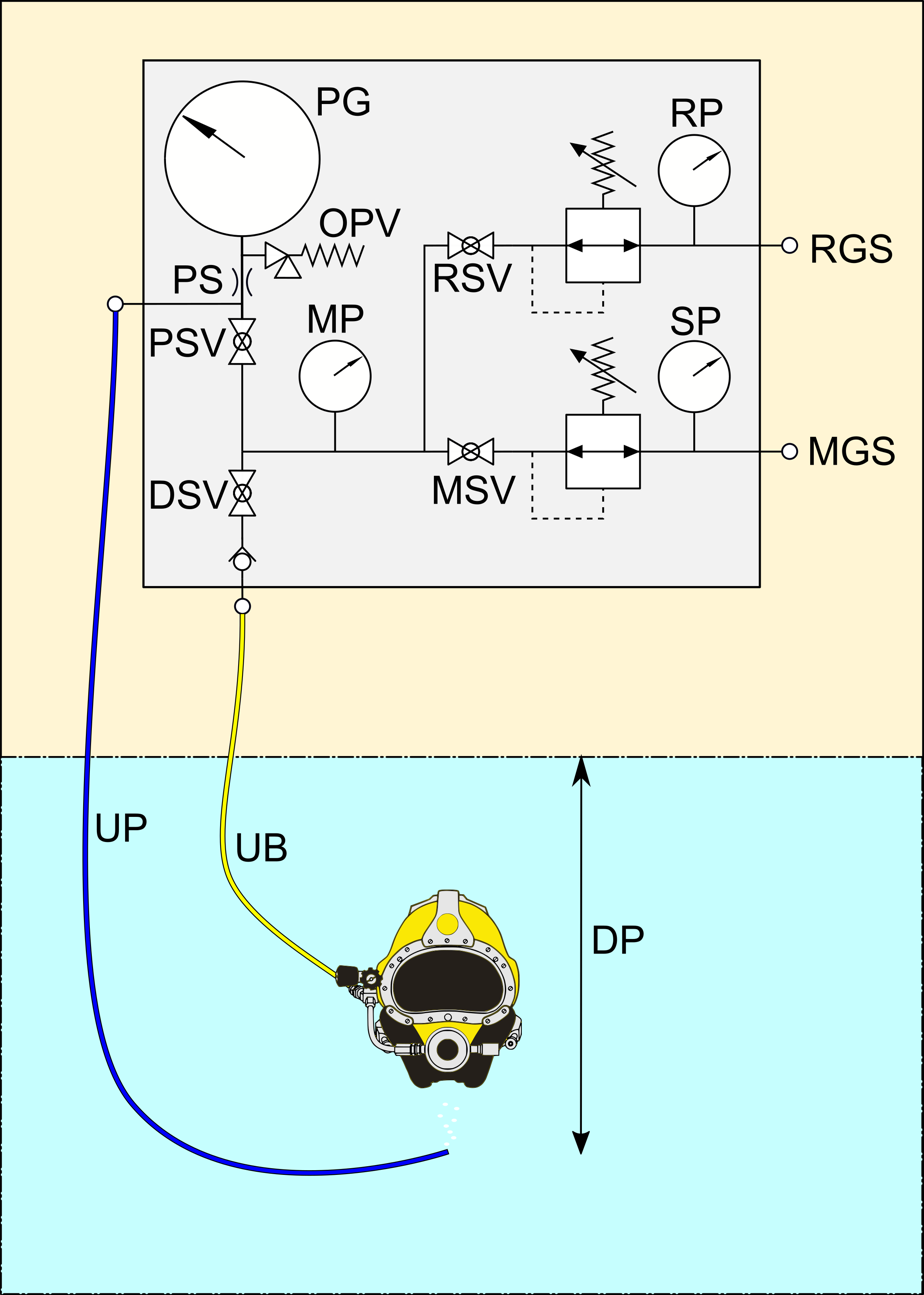
Surface supplied diving gas panel for one diver: PG: pneumofathometer gauge; OPV: overpressure valve; PS: pneumo snubber; PSV: pneumo supply valve; DSV: diver supply valve; MP: manifold pressure; RSV: reserve supply valve; RP: reserve pressure; MSV: main supply valve; SP: supply pressure; RGS: reserve gas supply; MGS: main gas supply; UP: umbilical pneumo hose; UB: umbilical breathing gas hose; DP: depth measured by pneumofathometer

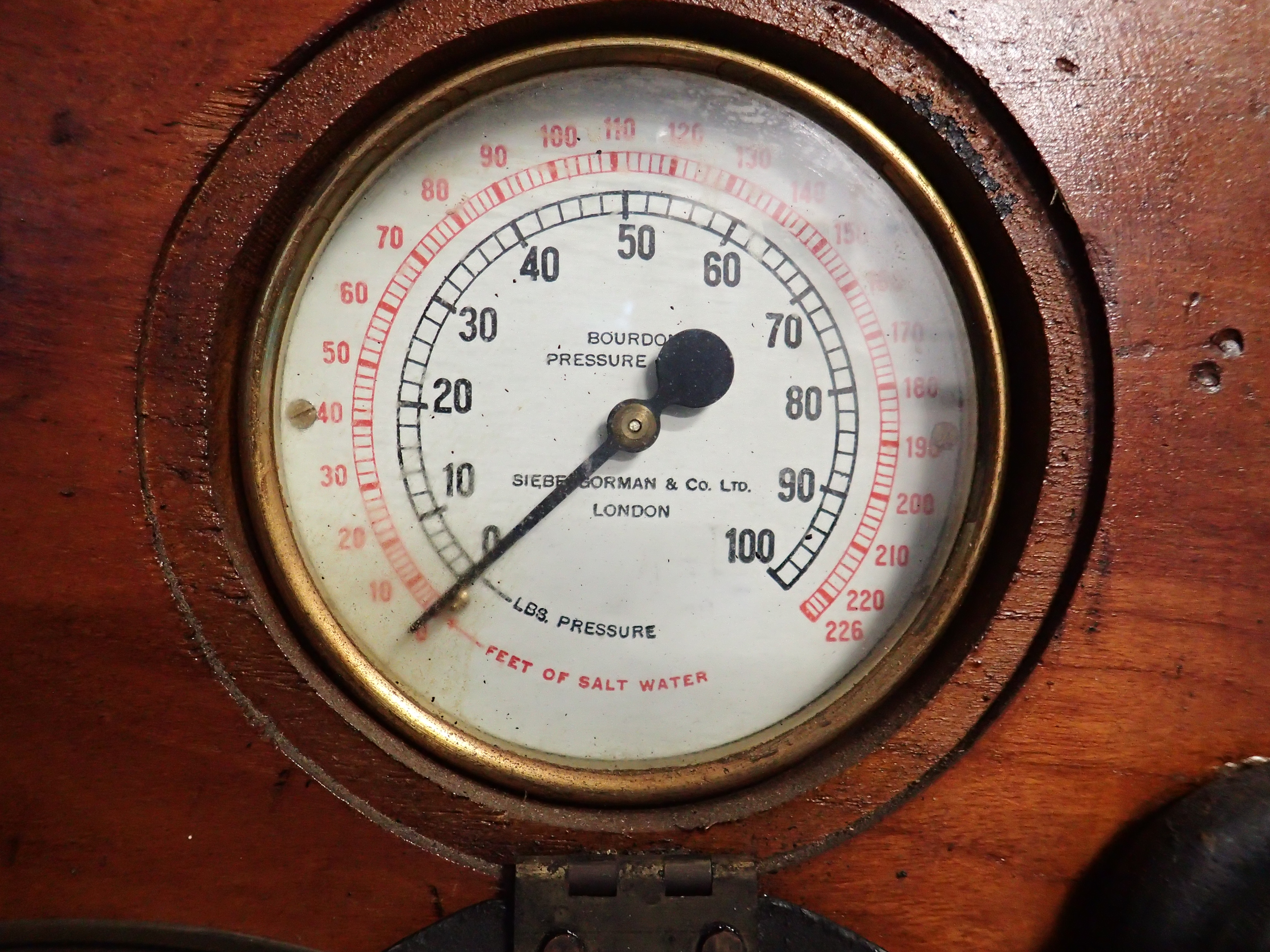
Pressure gauge on Siebe Gorman manual diver's pump, indicating delivered pressure in pounds per square inch (black) and feet sea water (red)

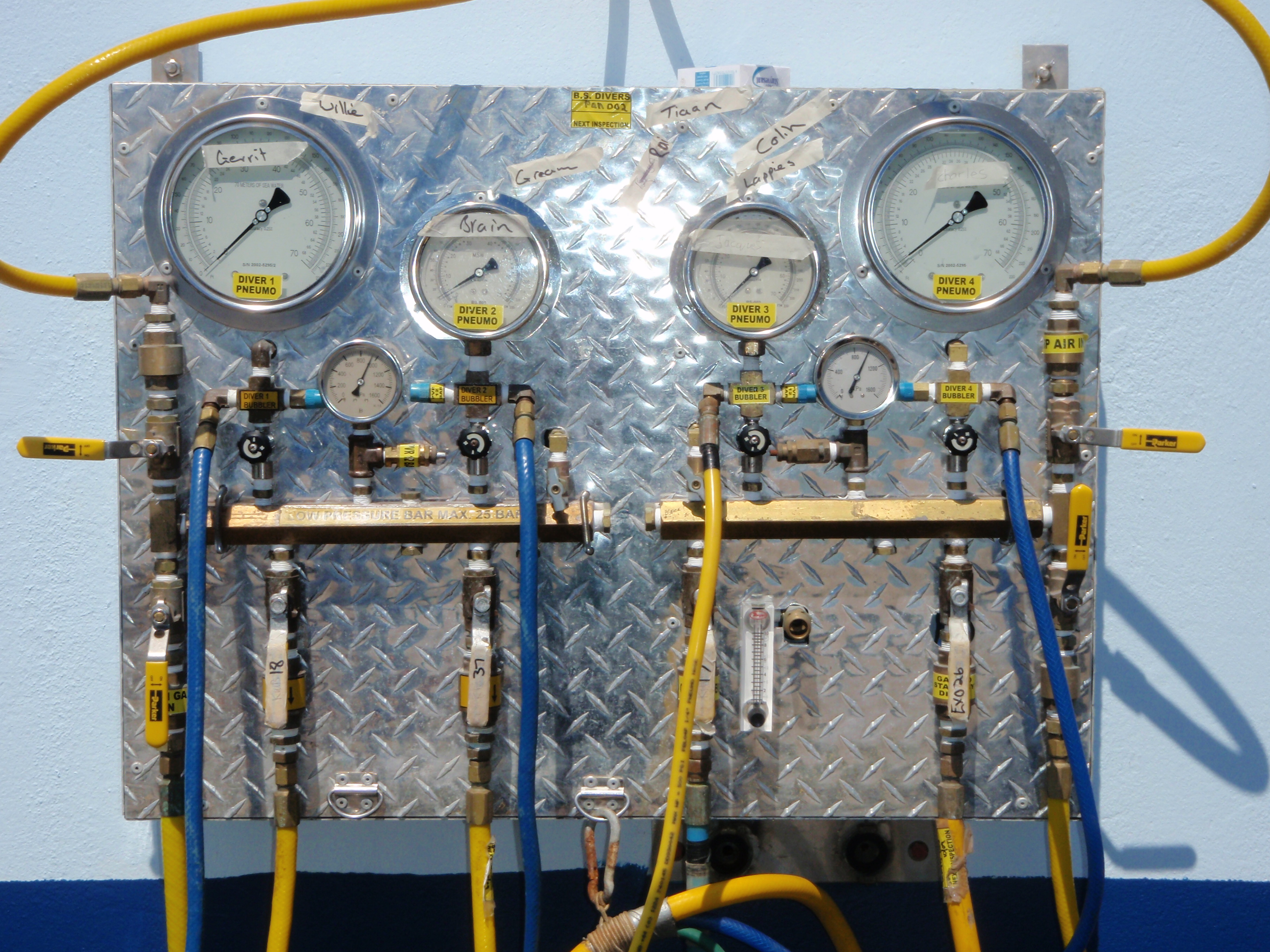
Surface supply air panel with supply pressure gauges (small) and pneumofathometer gauges (large diameter). Three of the four "pneumo lines" are blue.

A pneumofathometer is a depth gauge which indicates the depth of a surface supplied diver by measuring the pressure of air supplied to the diver. Originally there were pressure gaues mounted on the hand cranked diver's air pump used to provide breathing air to a diver wearing standard diving dress, with a free-flow air supply, in which there was not much back-pressure other than the hydrostatic pressure of depth. As non-return valves were added to the system for safety, they increased back pressure, which also increased when demand helmets were introduced, so an additional small diameter hose was added to the diver's umbilical which has no added restrictions and when a low flow rate of gas is passed through it to produce bubbles at the diver, it gives an accurate, reliable and rugged system for measuring diver depth, which is still used as the standard depth monitoring equipment for surface supplied divers. The pneumofathometer gauges are mounted on the diver's breathing gas supply panel, and are activated by a valve. The "pneumo line", as it is generally called by divers, can be used as an emergency breathing air supply, by tucking the open end into the bottom of the helmet or full face mask and opening up the valve to provide free flow air. A "gauge snubber" needle valve or orifice is fitted between the pneumo line and the gauge to reduce shock loads on the delicate mechanism, and an overpressure valve protects the gauge from pressures beyond its operating range. The type of high precision gauge used is also known as a caisson gauge. Precision is typically 1% to 0.25% of full scale.

== Dive computer ==
Dive computers have an integrated depth gauge, with digitized output which is used in the calculation of the current decompression status of the diver. The dive depth is displayed along with other values on the display and recorded by the computer for continuous simulation of the decompression model. Most dive computers contain a piezoresistive pressure sensor. Rarely, capacitive or inductive pressure sensors are used.

== Uses ==
A diver uses a depth gauge with decompression tables and a watch to avoid decompression sickness. A common alternative to the depth gauge, watch and decompression tables is a dive computer, which has an integral depth gauge, and displays the current depth as a standard function.

== See also ==
- Altimeter – Instrument used to determine the height of an object above a certain point
- Bathometer – Tool for measuring water depth
- Bathymetry – Study of underwater depth of lake or ocean floors
- Depth sounding – Measuring the depths of a body of water
