= Britannia's Gold Ltd =

- Company type: Private
- Industry: Deep-sea diving Treasure hunting
- Founded: 2016
- Key people: Philip Reid (Chairman)
- Website: britanniasgold.com

Britannia's Gold Ltd is a British company engaged in the salvage of precious metals from sunken carriers around the world. Much of their research, conducted over decades, indicates that around £323 Billion of gold and silver was shipped by the British government between 1914 and 1945, a number of which were sunk by German U-Boats. The aim of Britannia’s Gold is to locate and retrieve these sunken cargoes, with a portion of the profits returned to the UK for the benefit of the Government and Merchant Marine Charities.

== Research ==
The company’s premise is based on over 25 years of research, including maritime and financial records, inquest reports, and first-person testimonies. Through their research on war-risk insurance pay-outs and associated wartime vessels, the BGL team have identified some 700 ships that should contain lost bullion.

During World Wars I and II, this bullion was being transported to both The United States and members of the British Commonwealth as a means of paying for necessary war materials. The company estimates that some 2000 tons of precious metals, mainly gold and silver bullion, was sunk from ships that predominantly left from Glasgow and Liverpool.

== Retrieval ==
For security reasons, the company has not revealed the details of which port they are based out of.

For their specific needs, the company charters suitable salvage vessels, which meet the need of each unique salvage operation. The use of Dynamic Positioning (DP), Work Class ROVs, cranes, and other sub-sea equipment allows these ships to stay directly above their targets. From their ship, the crew can lower ROVs to depths of 5,500m to investigate the wrecks and prepare for the next stage of retrieving the precious metals, which include gold, silver, and non-irradiated steel.

As the bullion remains in the ownership of the British Government, the company is in negotiations to determine how the retrieved bullion will be brought back to the UK. Since 1914, all British warships sunk are classified as both war graves and sovereign territory. Merchant vessel wrecks, however, do not have the same legal protection. As a mark of respect for lives lost, the team at Britannia’s Gold will place a commemorative plaque at each wreck site upon completion of salvage operations.

== Financial backing ==
Britannia's Gold Ltd is backed by private investment.
