= Emerson Emory =

American physician

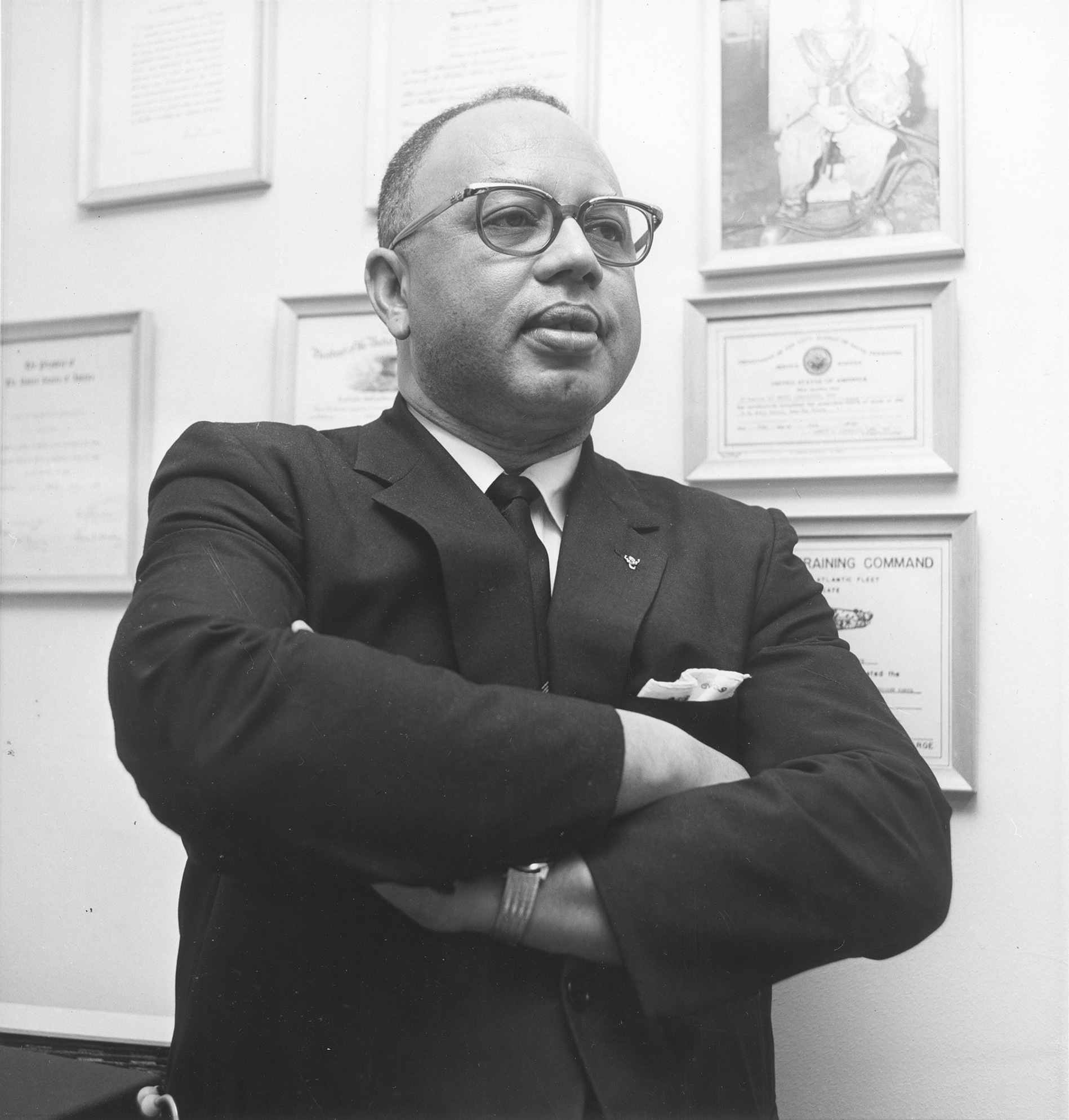
- Born: January 29, 1925; Dallas, Texas, United States
- Died: January 28, 2003 (aged 77); Dallas, Texas, United States
- Occupations: Physician (internist and psychiatrist)

Emerson Emory (January 29, 1925 – January 28, 2003) was an American internist and psychiatrist from Dallas, Texas. Aspiring to be a doctor from an early age, he attended Prairie View State Normal and Industrial College before serving in the Quartermaster Corps of the United States Army during World War II. After studying at Lincoln University in Pennsylvania and Meharry Medical College in Nashville, Tennessee, Emory conducted his residency at St. Paul's Hospital, which was the first major hospital in Dallas to grant staff privileges to African American doctors.

Emory was a staff physician at United States Department of Veterans Affairs (VA) medical centers in Dallas and McKinney, Texas, before beginning a private practice specializing in internal medicine in South Dallas in 1960. Starting in 1966, he specialized in psychiatry at the University of Texas Southwestern Medical School in Dallas, the Terrell State Hospital, and the Federal Correctional Institution in Seagoville, Texas, before ultimately resuming private practice as a specialist in both internal medicine and psychiatry.

Emory was also active in politics and the community. Although he was never elected, he ran for office several times, including twice for Mayor of Dallas, once for the Dallas City Council, and once for the Texas Legislature. He was a member of the Texas State Convention of the Improved Benevolent and Protective Order of Elks of the World, the Southern Christian Leadership Conference (SCLC)'s Dallas branch, and the United Service Organizations (USO)'s Dallas Council. He was also a member of the Sons of Confederate Veterans.

== Early life and education ==
Emerson Emory was born in Dallas on January 29, 1925, to Corry Bates Emory and Louise (Linthicum) Emory. His father, Corry, was a veteran of World War I. His family raised him as a Roman Catholic. From an early age, Emory aspired to become a doctor.

In 1940, Emory graduated from Booker T. Washington High School in Dallas. He then attended Prairie View State Normal and Industrial College between 1940 and 1942.

== Military service ==
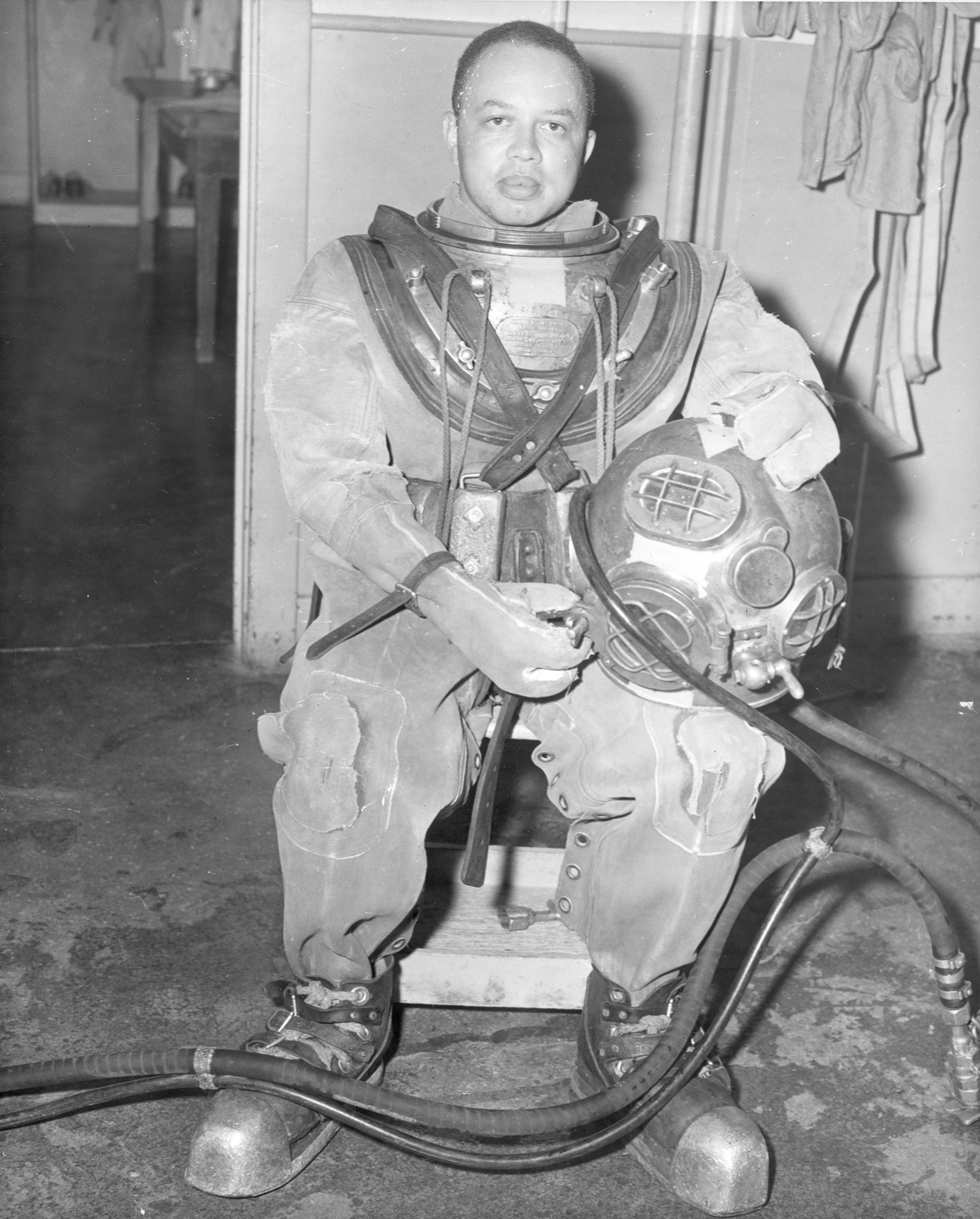
Emory in standard diving dress while serving in the United States Naval Reserve

Emory enlisted in the United States Army at the age of 18 and served in the Quartermaster Corps in both the European and Pacific Theaters of World War II. In 1946, he was honorably discharged from the Army.

After beginning his medical career, Emory was commissioned as an ensign in the United States Naval Reserve. In 1972, he co-founded the National Naval Officers Association and was elected its first president. He also served as a member of the United States Naval Academy's Congressional Selection Committee. Emory ultimately rose to the rank of captain in the Naval Reserves by the time he retired in 1979.

== Medical career ==
Emory completed the undergraduate pre-medical program at Lincoln University in Pennsylvania in 1948, at the age of 23. Four years later, he earned a Doctor of Medicine (M.D.) from Meharry Medical College in Nashville, Tennessee. After graduating, he returned to his hometown of Dallas, where he conducted his residency at St. Paul's Hospital. In December 1953, he was granted license to practice medicine in Texas. He completed his residency in 1954, the same year St. Paul's became the first major hospital in Dallas to grant staff privileges to African American doctors.

Between 1954 and 1956, Emory completed residency programs at the City of Hope National Medical Center in Duarte, California, and at Wadsworth General Hospital, a United States Department of Veterans Affairs (VA) hospital in Los Angeles. He then returned to Texas to study law, attending the Southern Methodist University School of Law in 1956 and 1957 and then the Texas Southern University School of Law in 1957 and 1958.

Emory worked as a staff physician at VA medical centers in both Dallas and McKinney, Texas, between 1957 and 1960. He began a private practice specializing in internal medicine in South Dallas in 1960. For two months in 1966, he treated Vietnamese citizens as the first African American volunteer to participate in the American Medical Association (AMA)'s Volunteer Physicians for the Viet Nam project.

The next phase of Emory's career saw him highly involved in psychiatry. Between 1966 and 1969, he was a Fellow in Psychiatry at the University of Texas Southwestern Medical School in Dallas. He subsequently served as staff psychiatrist at the Terrell State Hospital and then as chief of psychiatric services at the Federal Correctional Institution in Seagoville, Texas. When he returned to private practice in 1972, he was specializing in psychiatry in addition to internal medicine.

In 1979, Emory was accused of illegally dispensing narcotics from his practice. After defending himself in court and arguing for the necessity of his actions to help addicts fight more severe drugs, he was found guilty and sentenced to two years in prison.

== Politics and community involvement ==
Emory was active in Dallas politics. Although he was never elected, he ran for office several times, including twice for Mayor of Dallas, once for the Dallas City Council, and once for the Texas Legislature.

In 1962, Emory was elected medical examiner of the Texas State Convention of the Improved Benevolent and Protective Order of Elks of the World, and in 1965, he was elected the Elks Trinity Lodge's exalted ruler. Emory was an active member of the Southern Christian Leadership Conference (SCLC)'s Dallas branch, of which he became the executive director in 1993. In 1970, he served as the first African American president of the United Service Organizations's (USO) Dallas Council, and was also a delegate to the White House Conference on Children and Youth in Washington, D.C., that same year.

Emory was an advocate for the homeless, treatment for adult drug addicts, and voting rights for ex-convicts who served their prison sentences. He also believed in the effectiveness of litigation for the advancement of civil rights and filed lawsuits against the City of Dallas, the Dallas Independent School District, and the University of Texas Southwestern Medical Center.

In the 1990s, he helped protect the historic Freedman's Cemetery in Dallas during the expansion of Central Expressway. He also volunteered for Black Citizens for Justice, Law and Order.

== Personal life ==
Emory was married to Peggy Lillian Herald, with whom he had three children before separating: Emerson "Rusty" Emory, Jr., Karon Hutcheson, and Sharon Emory.

Emory considered himself a history buff, and was especially drawn to the history of the Confederacy. Diverging from the common attitude among African Americans, who tend to regard negatively the heritage of the slave-owning Confederacy, he joined the Sons of Confederate Veterans after discovering that he was likely descended from Capt. Henry C. Hancock, a member of the Seventeenth Texas Cavalry who was killed at the Battle of Mansfield.

In 1998, Emory made national news when he expressed a desire to read a poem and lay a wreath on behalf of the Sons of Confederate Veterans at the newly dedicated African American Civil War Memorial in Washington, D.C. His request was denied, but he nevertheless laid a wreath discreetly during a midnight visit. He also requested to lay a Confederate flag at the Tomb of the Unknowns at Arlington National Cemetery, which was also denied. In 1999, Emory served as the guest speaker at the Sons of Confederate Veterans' Texas Confederate Heritage Celebration in Austin.

Emory died January 28, 2003, one day shy of his 78th birthday, of complications from cancer at Methodist Medical Center in Dallas. His funeral Mass was held at Holy Spirit Catholic Church in Duncanville, Texas, and he was buried in southern Dallas County at Carver Cemetery.

== Honors and legacy ==
In 1966, Emory received the United States Agency for International Development's Humanitarian Award and in 1969, he received the Outstanding Achievement in Race Relations from the Interdenominational Ministers' Alliance. He was presented the Dallas Negro Chamber of Commerce's Committee of 100 Award in Medicine in 1973 and was named a "Dallas Living Legend" by the Junior Black Academy of Arts and Letters in 1990.

Emory had a legacy of community service, political activism, and dedication to his beliefs. His motto was "deeds, not words". Those who commented on Emory's activities often found the seeming contradiction of his views confounding: on the one hand, he was a strong supporter of civil rights for African Americans, and on the other, he embraced Confederate heritage and the bravery of Confederate soldiers. "Dr. Emerson Emory's office is surely among the few in which a Confederate flag shares wall space with a photo of Hillary Rodham Clinton", wrote David Flick for The Dallas Morning News. He described Emory as someone who often held "contradictory and surprising beliefs".
