= National Naval Officers Association =

Support organization of the US Navy, Marine Corps, and Coast Guard

- Founded: 1972
- Website: nnoa.org

National Naval Officers Association (NNOA) is a nonprofit 501(c)(3) support organization of the United States Navy, United States Marine Corps and the United States Coast Guard.

NNOA is composed of active duty, Reserve and retired officers, Midshipmen from the United States Naval Academy, the United States Coast Guard Academy and Naval Reserve Officer Training Corps (NROTC) units, and interested civilians.

NNOA is sanctioned by the Secretary of the Navy and the Secretary of Homeland Security and is a member of the Navy and Marine Corps Council.

== History ==
LT Kenneth H. Johnson, while serving as Advisor for Minority Affairs at the United States Naval Academy in 1970, sought methods to improve minority interest in recruitment efforts and participation in the Naval Academy's Blue and Gold Program. In 1971, faced with finding qualified naval officer candidates from minority communities, CAPT Emerson Emory, CAPT Claude Williams, CDR Emmanuel Jenkins, CWO James Harris and LT Johnson began to discuss forming an organization to assist minority officer recruitment. An organizational meeting was held at the Hilton Inn in Annapolis, Maryland in 1972 and NNOA was founded. CAPT Emerson Emory was elected the first president of NNOA.

The first chartered chapter was the Annapolis, Maryland chapter.

Since October 1982, National Naval Officers Association has maintained its tax-exempt status as a 501(c)(3) organization.

The chapter awarded a total of $52,000 in scholarship money to 33 students from 11 high schools in the District of Columbia and Virginia at the annual Ester Boone Scholarship Dinner.

The Washington, D.C. chapter has administered an Ester Boone Memorial Scholarship Programme. At its 2016 banquet, the chapter awarded scholarships amounting to more than $40,000, bringing the total awarded since 1992 to over $250,000.

On 28 December 2021, the NNOA renewed its Memorandum of Understanding (MoU) with the National Oceanic & Atmospheric Administration Commissioned Officer Corps (NOAA Corps).

In July 2022, the organization marked its 50th anniversary with a symposium in Annapolis, Maryland, including an awards luncheon where Chief of Naval Operations Adm. Mike Gilday addressed attendees.

The association reported total revenue of $206,844 and expenses of $206,040 the year 2024, with total assets of $214,055.

In February 2025, the Navy terminated the Memorandum of Understanding with the NNOA, which meant Navy personnel no longer could participate in events or use resources and funding, while Sailors continued to be eligible to participate in events in an unofficial capacity.

The NNOA established the National Naval Officers Association Foundation in 2025.

== Annual conference ==
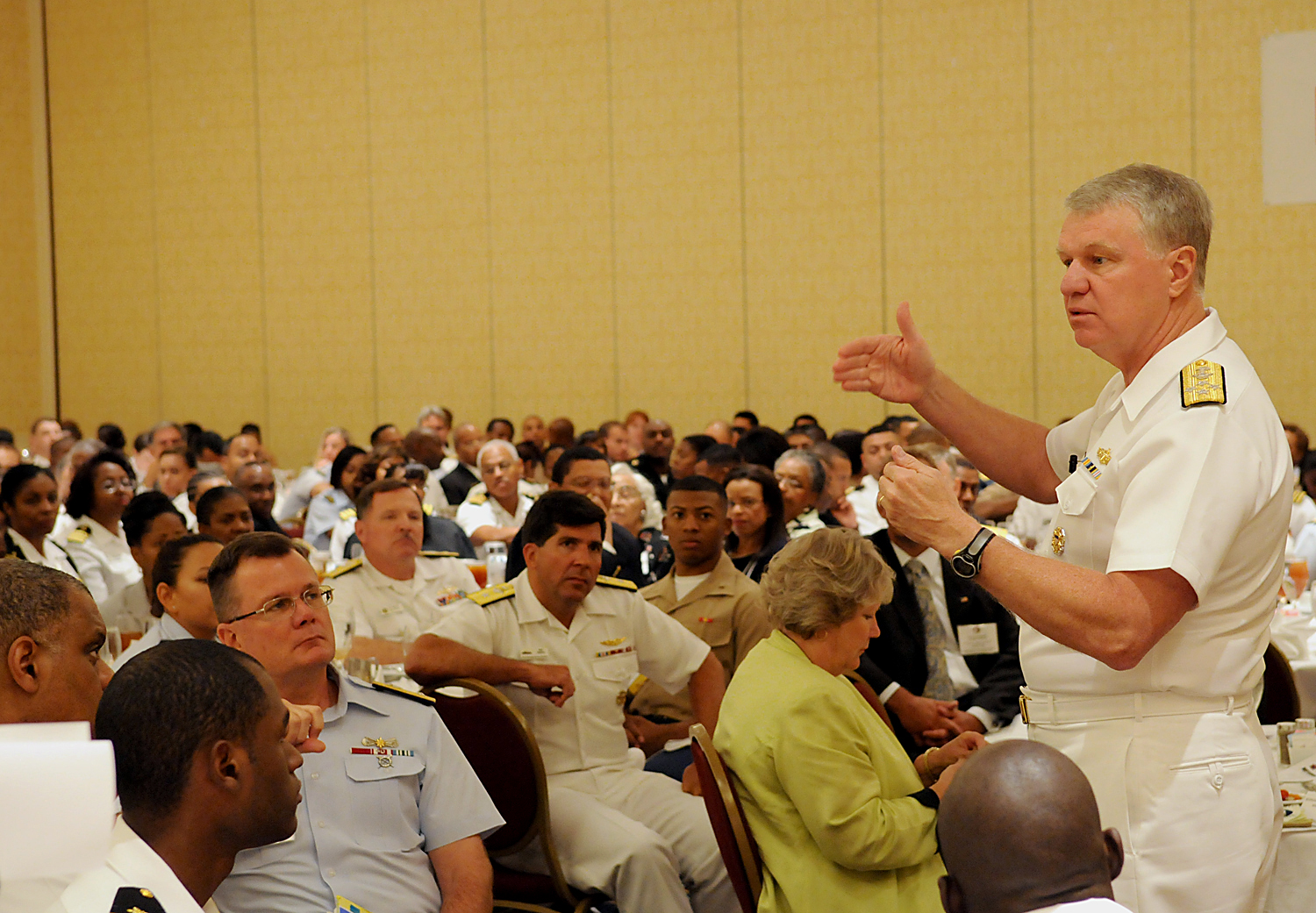
PORTSMOUTH, Va. (July 24, 2008) Chief of Naval Operations (CNO) Adm. Gary Roughead speaks during the 36th Annual National Naval Officers Association (NNOA) professional development and training conference. (U.S. Navy photo by Mass Communication Specialist 2nd Class R.J. Stratchko/Released)

The National Naval Officers Association's National Conference, held annually during July, includes many hours of educational and professional development workshops, seminars, and exhibits designed to enhance the professional knowledge of attendees while increasing overall awareness of issues affecting the sea service.

The first annual meeting, the Professional Development and Training Symposium, was held in San Diego, California in 1973. In 2017 the theme was “Developing Leaders Through Education, Experience and Personal Development.”, 2018 was “Embracing Diversity to Strengthen the Sea Services”, 2019 was “Charting a Course for Tomorrow’s Leaders”, 2023 was "NNOA: Developing Tomorrow's Leaders Through Mentorship & Professional Development".

In July 2010, the NNOA joined together with the Naval Service Officers (ANSO) for the first combined Professional Development and Training Conference. In 2024, the NNOA and the ANSO held their second Joint Leadership and Professional Development Symposium in Norfolk, Virginia.
