= Terrell State Hospital =

Coordinates: 32.742°N 96.264°W

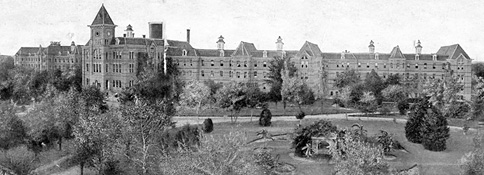
- Terrell State Hospital, original building

Geography
- Location: Terrell, Texas, United States

Organization
- Care system: Texas Department of State Health Services
- Type: Specialist

Services
- Speciality: Psychiatric hospital

History
- Former names: North Texas Lunatic Asylum; North Texas Hospital for the Insane
- Opened: July 14, 1885; 140 years ago

Links
- Website: www.hhs.texas.gov/services/mental-health-substance-use/state-hospitals/terrell-state-hospital
- Lists: Hospitals in Texas

Terrell State Hospital is a public psychiatric hospital located in Terrell, Texas, United States. Opened in 1885, it was originally known as the North Texas Lunatic Asylum. The original hospital building was built according to the Kirkbride Plan.

== Notable people ==
- Oscar Branch Colquitt - 25th Governor of Texas, served on the board of managers.
