= Standard diving dress =

Copper helmet with rubberised canvas diving suit and weighted boots

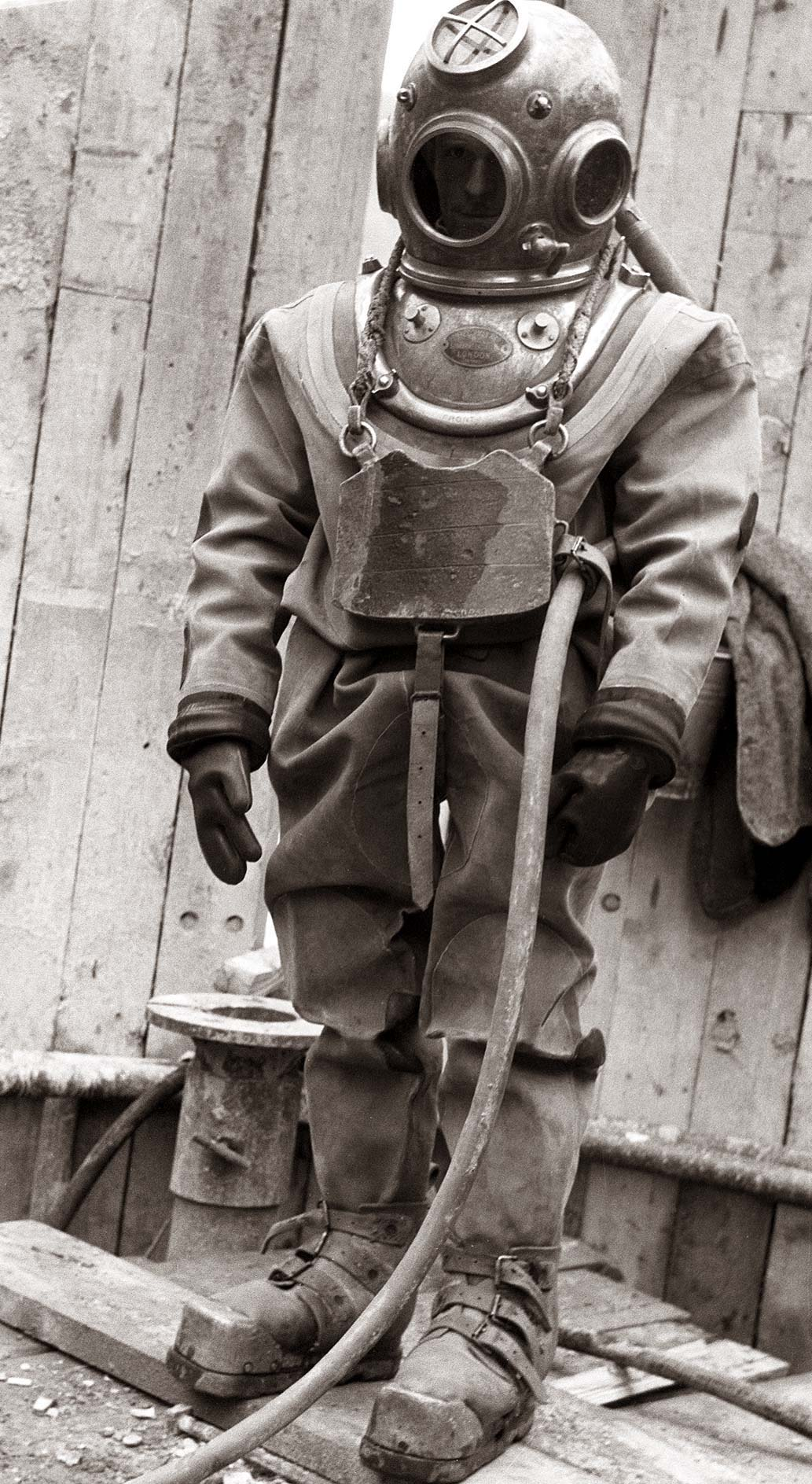
- Diver in standard diving dress, Ožbalt, Slovenia (1958)
- Other names: Heavy diving gear, deep sea diving suit
- Uses: Personal protective equipment with surface supplied breathing air for underwater diving
- Inventor: Deane brothers and Augustus Siebe
- Manufacturer: Various, see Manufacturers

Standard diving dress, also known as hard-hat or copper hat equipment, deep sea diving suit, or heavy gear, is a type of diving suit that was formerly used for all relatively deep underwater work that required more than breath-hold duration, which included marine salvage, civil engineering, pearl shell diving and other commercial diving work, and similar naval diving applications. Standard diving dress has largely been superseded by lighter and more comfortable equipment.

Standard diving dress consists of a diving helmet made from copper and brass or bronze, clamped over a watertight gasket to a waterproofed canvas suit, an air hose from a surface-supplied manually operated pump or low pressure breathing air compressor, a diving knife, and weights to counteract buoyancy, generally on the chest, back, and shoes. Later models were equipped with a diver's telephone for voice communications with the surface. The term deep sea diving was used to distinguish diving with this equipment from shallow water diving using a shallow water helmet, which was not sealed to the suit.

Some variants used rebreather systems to extend the use of gas supplies carried by the diver, and were effectively self-contained underwater breathing apparatus, and others were suitable for use with helium based breathing gases for deeper work. Divers could be deployed directly by lowering or raising them using the lifeline, or could be transported on a diving stage. Most diving work using standard dress was done heavy, with the diver sufficiently negatively buoyant to walk on the bottom, and the suits were not capable of the fine buoyancy control needed for mid-water swimming.

== History ==
=== Early history ===
In 1405, Konrad Kyeser described a diving dress made of a leather jacket and metal helmet with two glass windows. The jacket and helmet were lined by sponge to "retain the air" and a leather pipe was connected to a bag of air. A diving suit design was illustrated in a book by Vegetius in 1511.

Borelli designed diving equipment that consisted of a metal helmet, a pipe to "regenerate" air, a leather suit, and a means of controlling the diver's buoyancy. In 1690, Thames Divers, a short-lived London diving company, gave public demonstrations of a Vegetius type shallow water diving dress. Klingert designed a full diving dress in 1797. This design consisted of a large metal helmet and similarly large metal belt connected by leather jacket and trousers.

=== Development of the standard diving dress ===
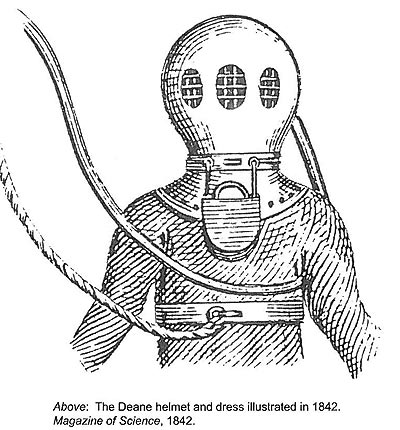
1842 sketch of the Deane brothers' diving helmet, the first practical surface-supplied diving equipment.

The first successful diving helmets were produced by the brothers Charles and John Deane in the 1820s. Inspired by a fire accident he witnessed in a stable in England, he designed and patented a "Smoke Helmet" to be used by firemen in smoke-filled areas in 1823. The apparatus comprised a copper helmet with an attached flexible collar and garment. A long leather hose attached to the rear of the helmet was to be used to supply air – the original concept being that it would be pumped using a double bellows. A short pipe allowed breathed air to escape. The garment was constructed from leather or airtight cloth, secured by straps.

The brothers had insufficient funds to build the equipment themselves, so they sold the patent to their employer, Edward Barnard. It was not until 1827 that the first smoke helmets were built, by German-born British engineer Augustus Siebe. In 1828 they decided to find another application for their device and converted it into a diving helmet. They marketed the helmet with a loosely attached "diving suit" so that a diver could perform salvage work but only in a full vertical position, otherwise water entered the suit.

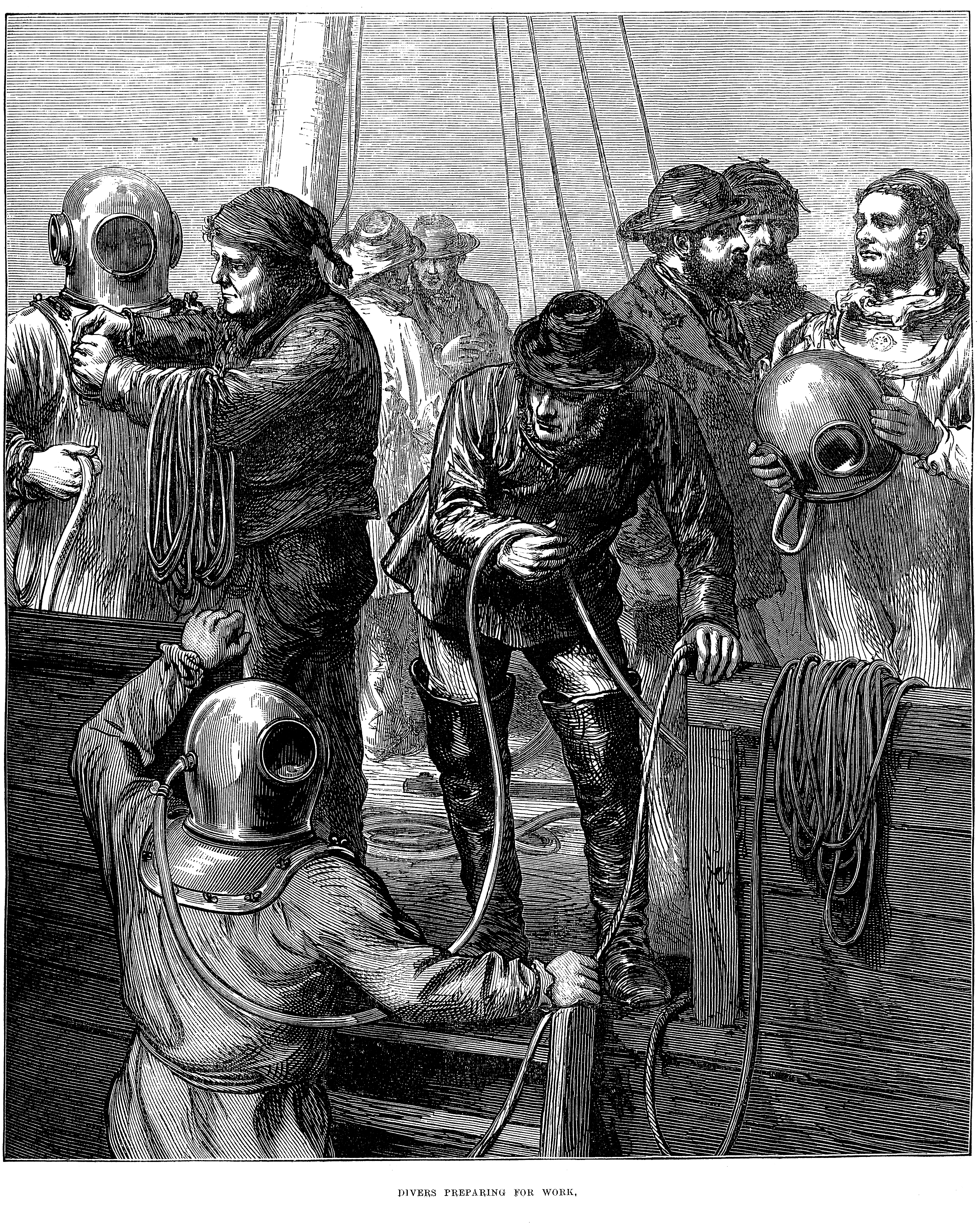
Siebe's improved design in 1873, from the Illustrated London News. The helmet's basic features can be seen: A helmet, supplied with air from the surface, and a waterproof suit. The corselet of the helmet is clamped onto the suit with wingnuts, which can be seen being tightened by one of the support crew on the left of the picture.

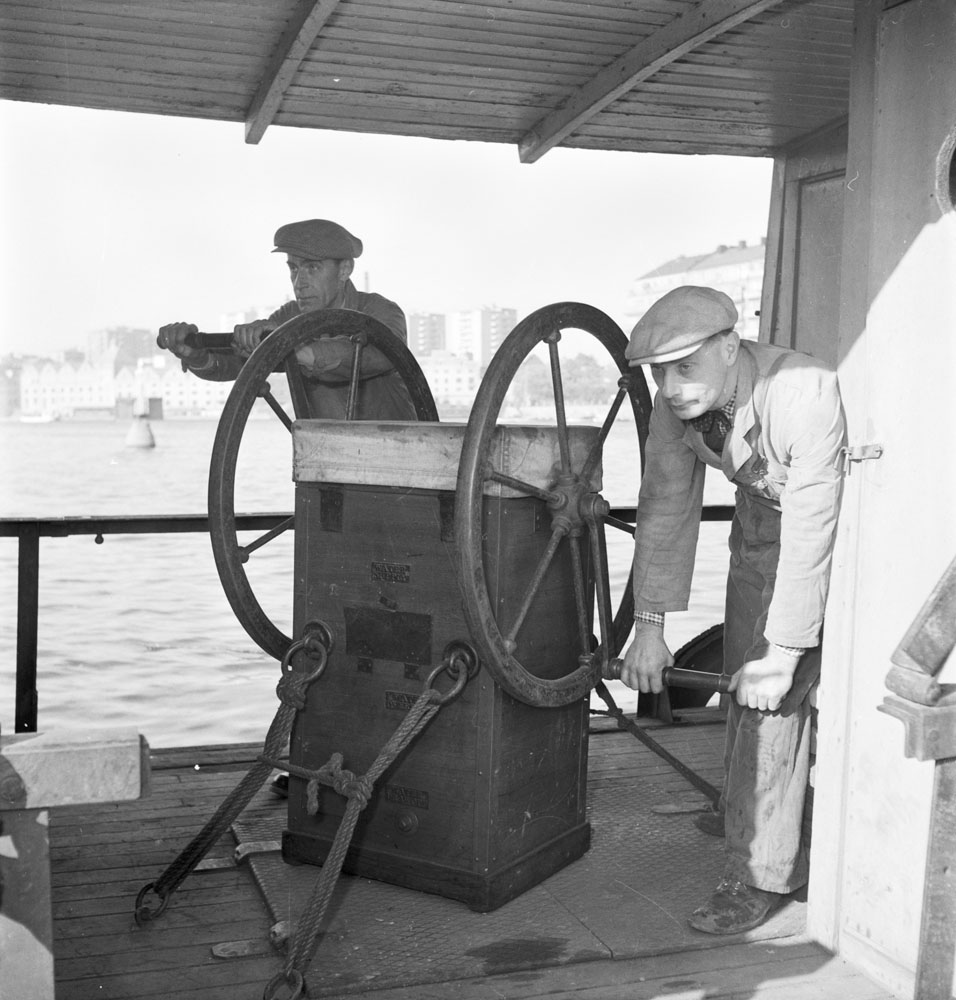
Air supplied from the boat by manually operated pump

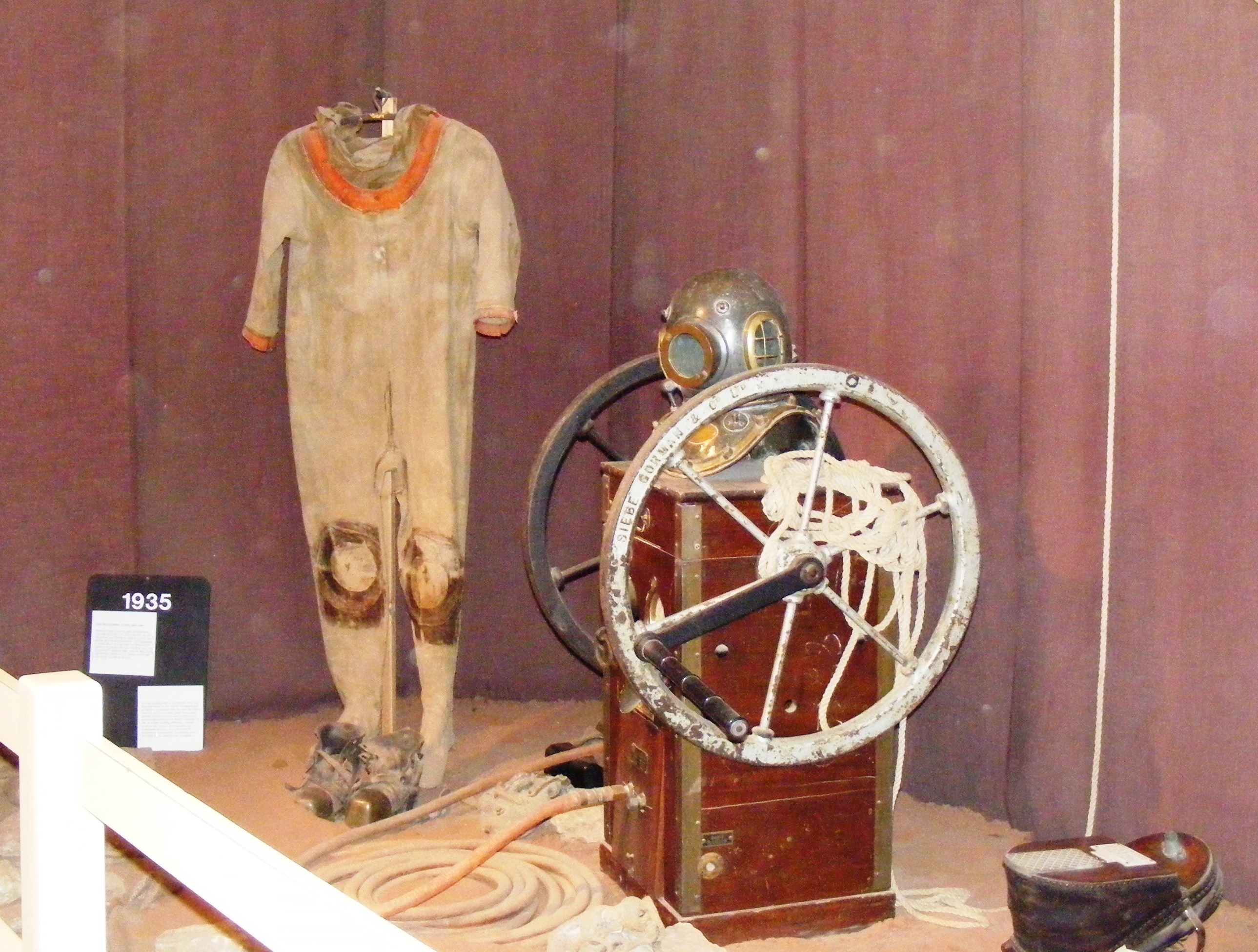
Cave diving equipment from 1935 in the museum at Wookey Hole Caves in Somerset

In 1829 the Deane brothers sailed from Whitstable for trials of their new underwater apparatus, establishing the diving industry in the town. In 1834 Charles used his diving helmet and suit in a successful attempt on the wreck of Royal George at Spithead, during which he recovered 28 of the ship's cannon. In 1836, John Deane recovered timbers, guns, longbows, and other items from the recently rediscovered wreckage of the Mary Rose.

By 1836 the Deane brothers had produced the world's first diving manual, Method of Using Deane's Patent Diving Apparatus, which explained in detail the workings of the apparatus and pump, plus safety precautions.

In the 1830s the Deane brothers asked Siebe to apply his skill to improve their underwater helmet design. Expanding on improvements already made by another engineer, George Edwards, Siebe produced his own design: a helmet fitted to a full-length watertight canvas diving suit. The real success of the equipment was a valve in the helmet that meant that it could not flood no matter how the diver moved. This resulted in safer and more efficient underwater work.

Siebe introduced various modifications on his diving dress design to accommodate the requirements of the salvage team on the wreck of HMS Royal George, including making the helmet be detachable from the corselet; his improved design gave rise to the typical standard diving dress which revolutionised underwater civil engineering, underwater salvage, commercial diving and naval diving.

In France in the 1860s, Rouquayrol and Denayrouze developed a single-stage demand regulator with a small low pressure reservoir, to make more economical use of surface supplied air pumped by manpower. This was originally used without any form of mask or helmet, but vision was poor, and the "pig-snout" copper mask was developed in 1866 to provide a clearer view through a glass faceplate on a copper mask clamped to the neck opening of the suit. This was soon improved to become a three-bolt helmet supported by a corselet (1867). Later versions were fitted for free-flow air supply.

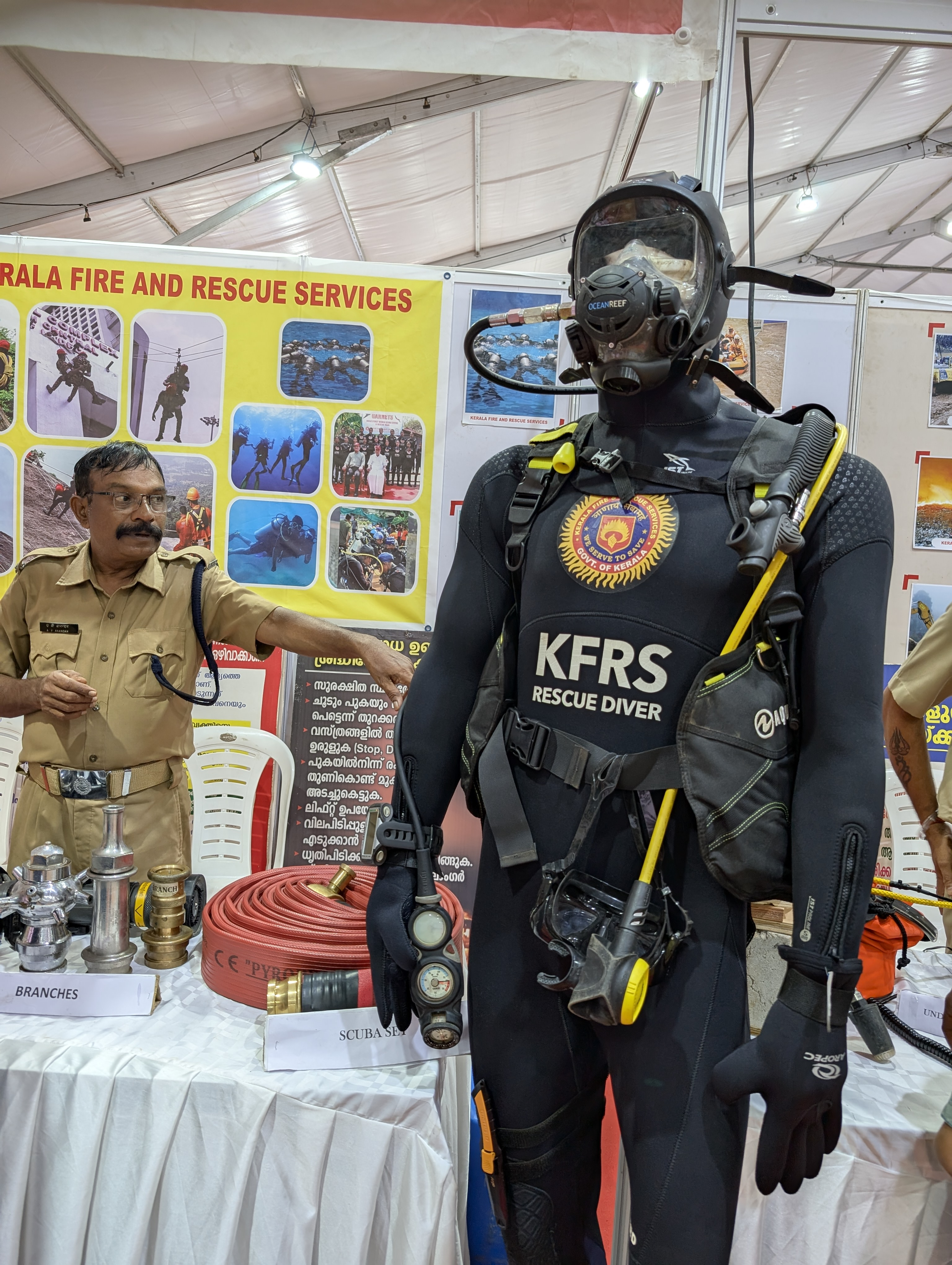
Kerala Fire and Rescue Services-Diving Dress

Later the standard helmet was modified for use with helium mixtures for deep work. This incorporated a carbon dioxide scrubber attached to the back of the helmet, with a venturi powered circulation system to recycle the gas, making it effectively a semi-closed circuit rebreather, much like the Dräger bubikopf helmet rebreather system.

=== Developments beyond the standard diving dress ===
More recent diving helmet designs can be classified as free-flow and demand helmets. They are generally made of stainless steel, fiberglass, or other strong and lightweight material. The copper helmets and standard diving dress are still widely used in parts of the world, but have largely been superseded by lighter and more comfortable equipment.

== General description ==
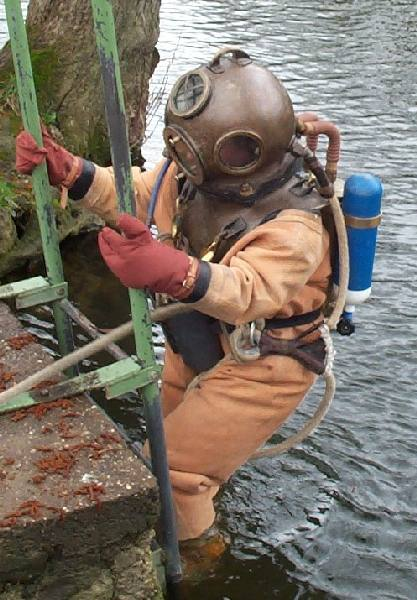
Helmeted diver entering the water. He has a back mounted Draeger DM40 rebreather system in addition to the surface supply air hose (2010)

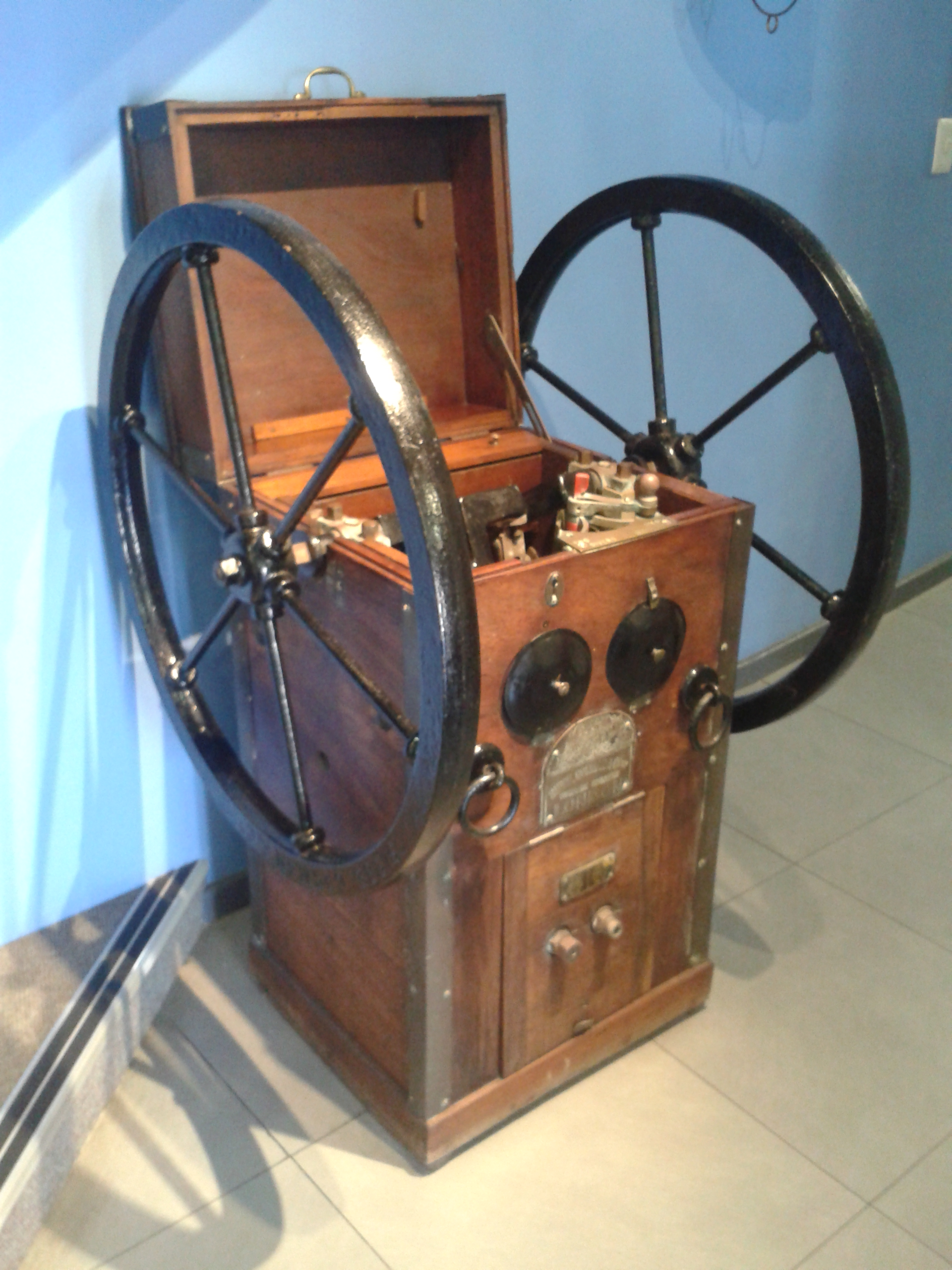
Manual air pump for Standard diving equipment

Standard diving dress can be used up to depths of 600 feet (180 m) of sea water, provided a suitable breathing gas mixture is used. Air or other breathing gas may be supplied from hand pumps, compressors, or banks of high pressure storage cylinders, generally through a hose from the surface, though some models are autonomous, with built-in rebreathers. In 1912 the German firm Drägerwerk of Lübeck introduced their own version of standard diving dress using a gas supply from an oxygen rebreather and no surface supply. The system used a copper diving helmet and standard heavy diving suit. The breathing gas was circulated by using an injector system in the loop. This was developed further with the Modell 1915 "Bubikopf" helmet and the DM20 oxygen rebreather system for depths up to 20 metres (70 ft), and the DM40 mixed gas rebreather which used an oxygen cylinder and an air cylinder for the gas supply for depths to 40 metres (130 ft).

Another unusual variation was the "pig-snout mask" of Rouquayrol-Denayrouze, which used a copper full-face mask clamped to the diving suit, which was structurally similar to the front of a copper helmet, and functioned in much the same way. It tended to sit quite far forward, making it inconvenient except when looking down, but was quite popular among German amber divers, as they spent most of their time looking down at the bottom.

A continuous flow of compressed air is provided to the helmet and vented to the surrounding water at a pressure very close to the ambient pressure at the exhaust port, which lets the diver breathe normally. The helmet must have a non-return valve at the air inlet port of the helmet, to prevent massive and fatal squeeze, should the air line be cut at the surface. Diving helmets, while very heavy, displace a great deal of water and combined with the air in the suit, would make the diver float with his head out of the water. To overcome this, some helmets are weighted on the corselet, while other divers wear weighted belts which have straps that go over the corselet. Some helmets have an air inlet control valve, while others may have only one control, the exhaust back-pressure. Helmet divers are subject to the same pressure limitations as other divers, such as decompression sickness and nitrogen narcosis.

The full standard diving dress can weigh 190 pounds (86 kg).

=== Suit ===
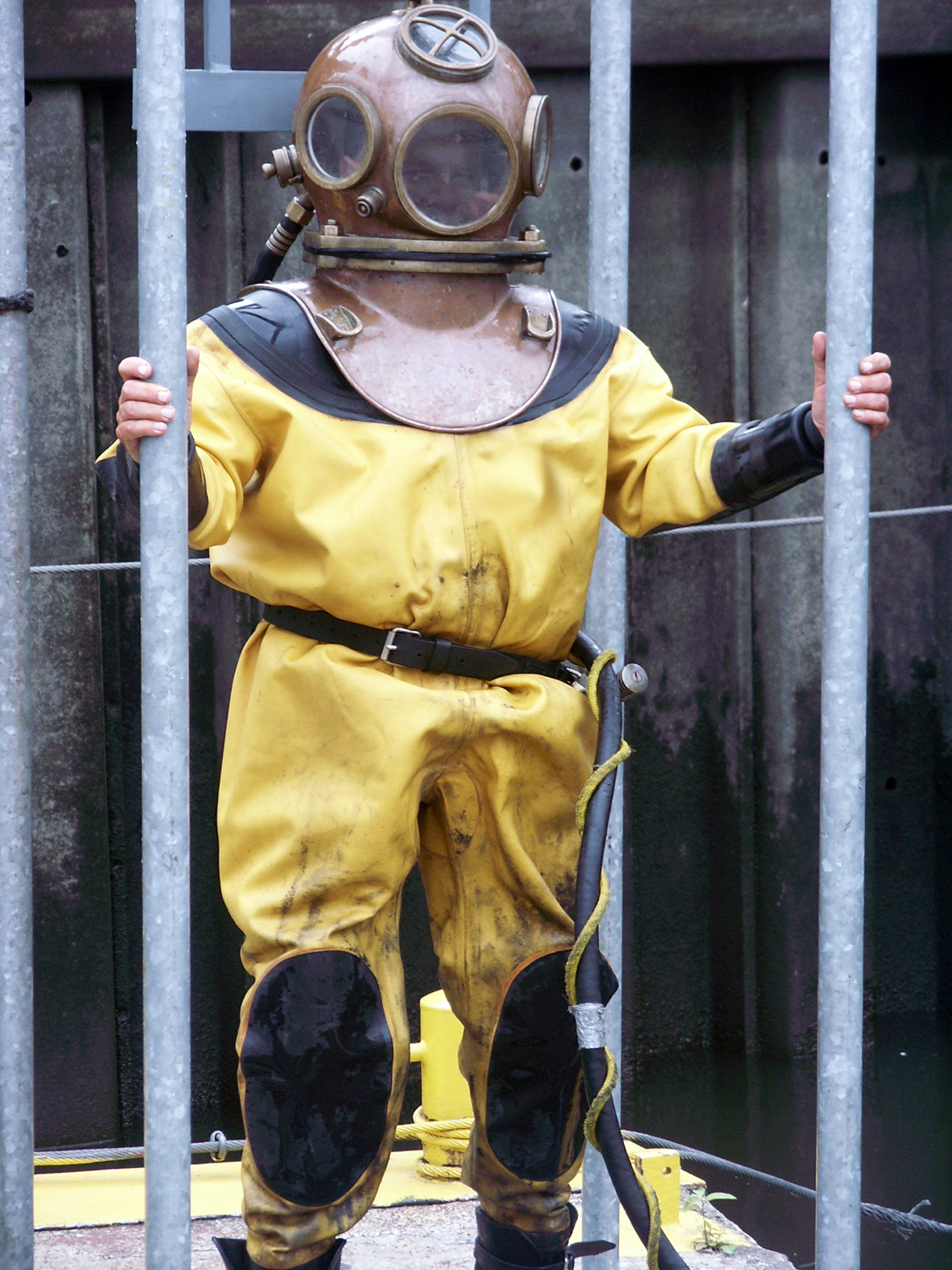
Harbour diver – civil engineering and ship maintenance in three bolt dress. Note the bolted connection between helmet and chest plate

The earliest suits were made of waterproofed canvas invented by Charles Mackintosh. From the late 1800s and throughout most of the 20th century, most suits consisted of a solid sheet of rubber between layers of tan twill. Their thick vulcanized rubber collar is clamped to the corselet making the joint waterproof. The inner collar (bib) was made of the same material as the suit and pulled up inside the corselet and around the diver's neck. The space between the bib and corselet would trap most condensation and minor leakage in the helmet, keeping the diver dry. The sleeves could be fitted with integral gloves or rubber wrist seals and the suit legs ended in integral socks.

The twill was available in heavy, medium, and light grades, with the heavy having the best resistance to abrasion and puncture against rough surfaces like barnacles, rocks, and the jagged edges of wreckage. Vulnerable areas were reinforced by extra layers of fabric. Different types of dress are defined by the clamping of the collar seal to the rim of the corselet or to the joint between bonnet and corselet, and the number of bolts used for this purpose. The legs of the suit may be laced at the back to limit inflated volume, which could prevent excess gas from getting trapped in the legs and dragging an inverted diver to the surface. In normal UK commercial diving activities, the legs often did not have the lace up option.

The rubberised fabric was waterproof, as was the seal to the helmet and the cuff seals, so the diver remains dry – a big advantage during long dives – and wears sufficient clothing under the suit to keep warm depending on the water temperature and expected level of exertion. The suit was usually a very baggy fit on the diver, and if over-inflated, would be too bulky to allow the diver to reach the control valves for air supply and exhaust. This contributed to the risk of suit blowup, which could cause an uncontrollable buoyant ascent, with high risk of decompression illness. To add to this problem, a runaway ascent could cause sufficient internal pressure to burst the seal at the corselet, which could result in a loss of buoyancy, and the injured diver sinking back to the bottom in a flooded suit. Consequently, divers would ensure that they remained sufficiently negative when underwater to minimise this risk. The bulkiness of fit, weighted boots and lack of fins made swimming impracticable. At the surface the diver could struggle a short distance using the arms, but underwater would normally walk on the bottom and climb up and down over obstacles, taking care to avoid passing under anything that could foul the air hose.

=== Helmet ===
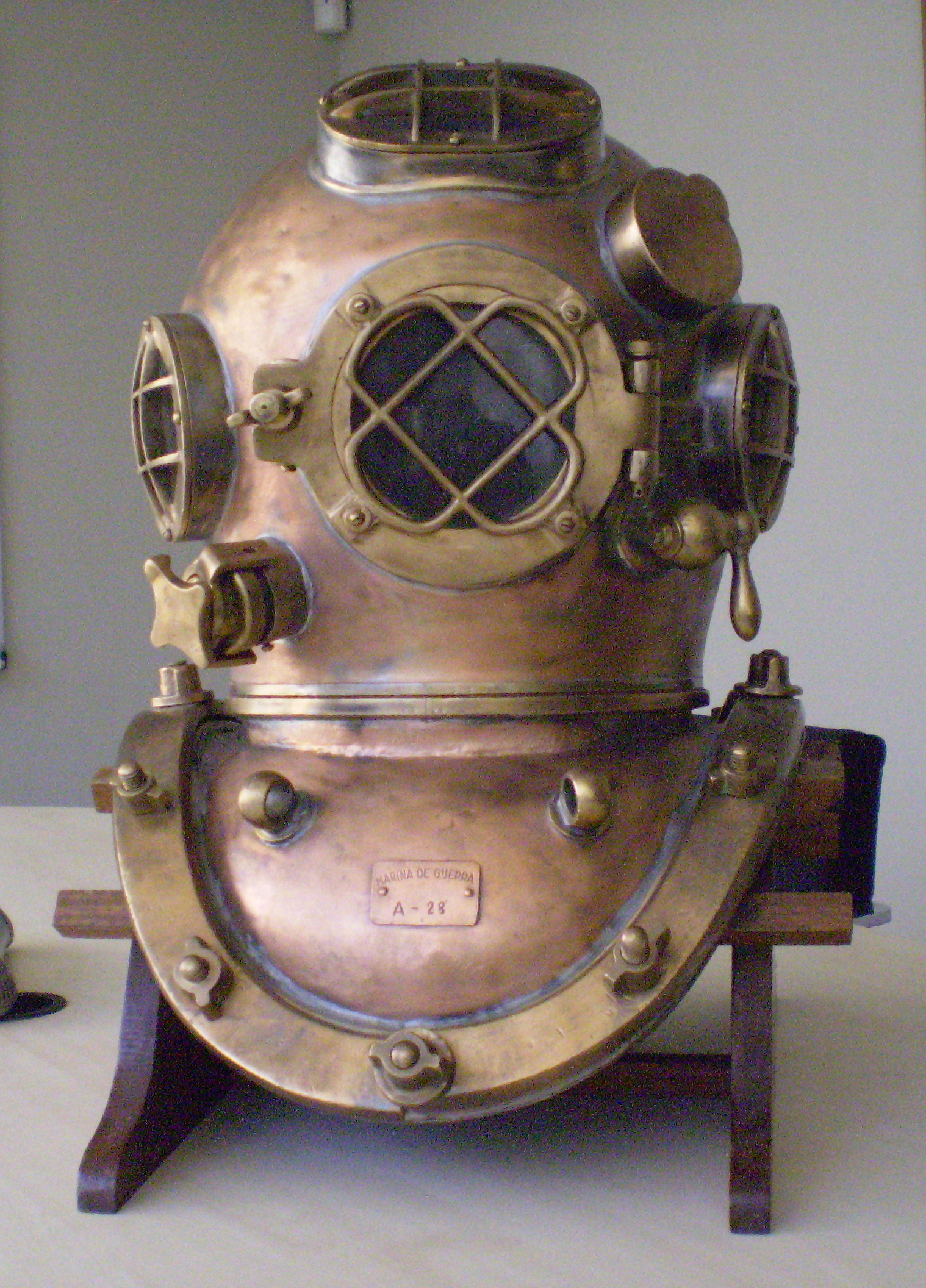
Copper four light, twelve bolt diving helmet with threaded connection between bonnet and corselet

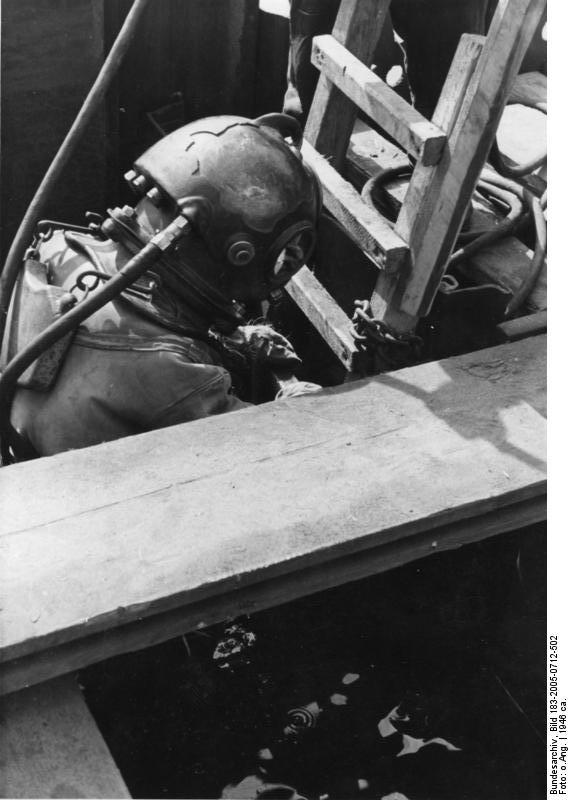
Dräger three-bolt bubikopf helmet in use for surface supplied diving

The helmet is usually made of two main parts: the bonnet, which covers the diver's head, and the corselet which supports the weight of the helmet on the diver's shoulders, and is clamped to the suit to create a watertight seal. The bonnet is attached and sealed to the corselet at the neck, either by bolts or an interrupted screw-thread, with some form of locking mechanism.

The helmet may be described by the number of bolts which hold it to the suit or to the corselet, and the number of vision ports, known as lights. For example, a helmet with four vision ports, and twelve studs securing the suit to the corselet, would be known as a "four light, twelve bolt helmet", and a three-bolt helmet used three bolts to secure the bonnet to the corselet, clamping the flange of the neck seal between the two parts of the helmet.

When the telephone was invented, it was applied to the standard diving dress for greatly improved communication with the diver.

==== Bonnet ====
The bonnet (UK) or helmet (US) is usually a spun copper shell with soldered brass or bronze fittings. It covers the diver's head and provides sufficient space to turn the head to look out of the glazed faceplate and other viewports (windows). The front port can usually be opened for ventilation and communication when the diver is on deck, by being screwed out or swung to the side on a hinge and secured in the closed position by a wing nut against a rubber gasket. The other lights (another name for the viewports) are generally fixed. A common arrangement was a faceplate in front, a right and left sideplate on the sides and a top plate above the faceplate. Viewports were glass on the early helmets, with some of the later helmets using acrylic, and are usually protected by brass or bronze grilles. The helmet has gooseneck fittings to connect the air line and the diver's telephone, usually at the back.

All helmets except the very earliest include a non-return valve where the airline is connected, which prevents potentially fatal helmet squeeze if the pressure in the hose is lost. The difference in pressure between the surface and the diver can be so great that if the air line is cut at the surface and there is no non-return valve, the diver would be partly squeezed into the helmet by the external pressure, and injured or possibly killed.

Helmets also have a spring-loaded exhaust valve which allows excess air to leave the helmet. The spring force is adjustable by the diver to prevent the suit from deflating completely or over-inflating and the diver being floated uncontrollably to the surface. The exhaust valve could also be temporarily opened or closed by pressing the internal flange with the chin to let more air out, or by pulling it with the lips to temporarily build up internal volume by closing the valve. The exhaust valve would generally only be adjustable within a specific pressure range. Beyond that limit it would open to release excess pressure, which would prevent a blowup if the diver was upright. Some helmets have an extra manual exhaust valve known as a spit-cock, which was usually a simple quarter-turn valve. This allowed the diver to manually vent excess air when in a position where the main exhaust could not function correctly, and make adjustments to the volume of the air in the suit without changing the exhaust valve setting. Water could also be sucked in through the spitcock and spat onto the viewports to defog them.

==== Corselet ====
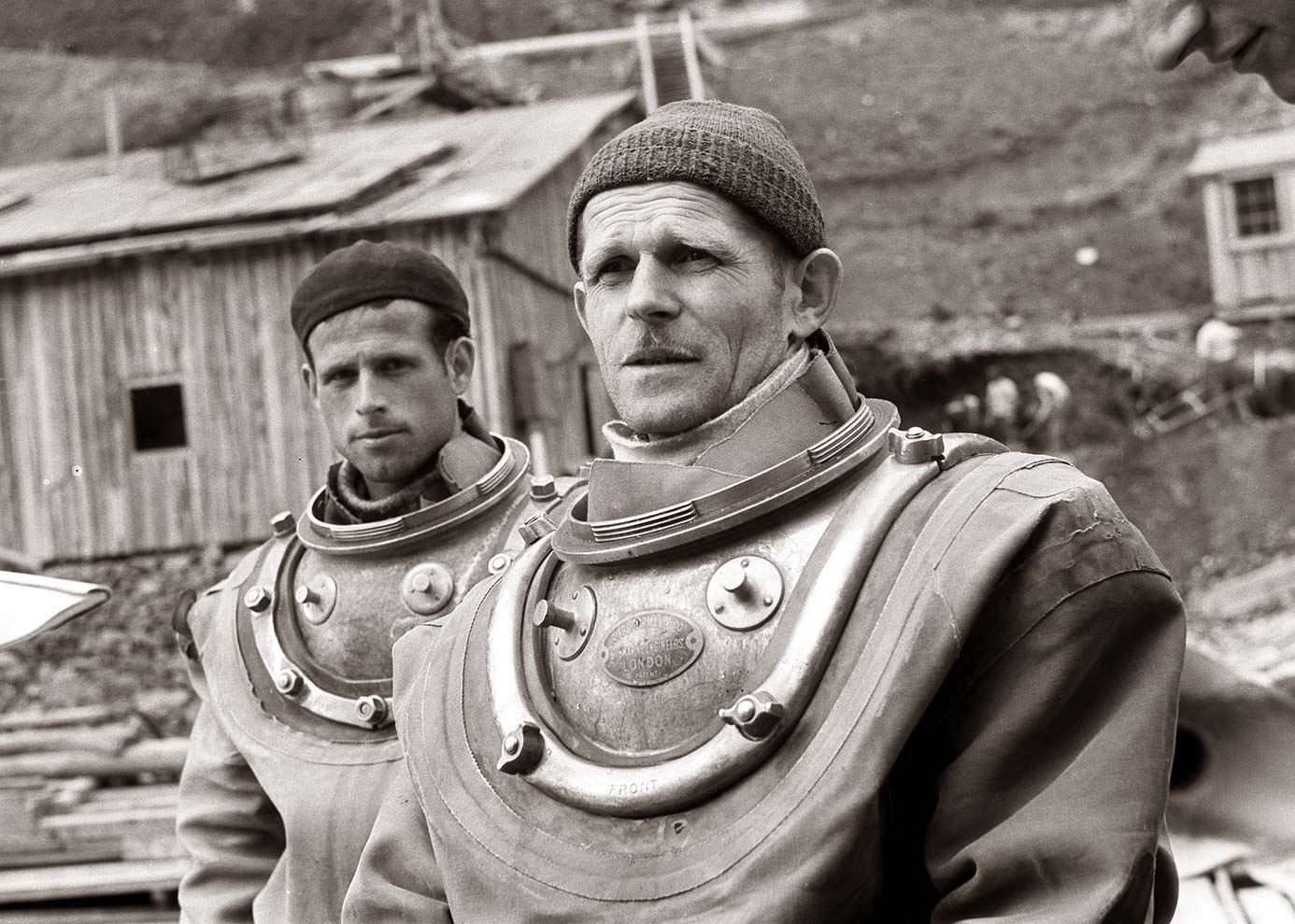
Corselet showing interrupted thread for helmet connection and brails (straps) clamping it to the suit. Six bolt front right, twelve bolt back left (1958)

The corselet (UK), also known as a breastplate (US), is an oval or rectangular collar-piece resting on the shoulders, chest and back, to support the helmet and seal it to the suit, usually made from copper and brass, but occasionally steel. The helmet is usually connected to the suit by placing the holes around the rubberised collar of the suit over bolts (studs) along the rim of the corselet, and then clamping the brass straps known as brailes (or brails) against the collar with wing nuts to press the rubber against the metal of the corselet rim to make a water-tight seal. Shim washers were used under the ends of the brailes to spread the load on the rubber evenly. An alternative method was to bolt the bonnet to the corselet over a rubber collar bonded to the top of the suit in the three- or two-bolt system.

Most six and twelve bolt helmet bonnets are joined to the corselet by 1/8th turn interrupted thread. The helmet neck thread is placed onto the neck of the corselet facing the divers left front, where the threads do not engage, and then rotated forward, engaging the thread and seating on a leather gasket to make a watertight seal. The helmet usually has a safety lock at the back which prevents the bonnet from rotating back and separating underwater. The lock may be further secured with a cotter pin. Other styles of connection are also used, with the joint secured by clamps or bolts (usually three, occasionally two).

The breastplate rests on the divers shoulders over the top of the suit, and over an optional padded breastplate cushion worn under the suit for comfort.

=== Diver's weights ===
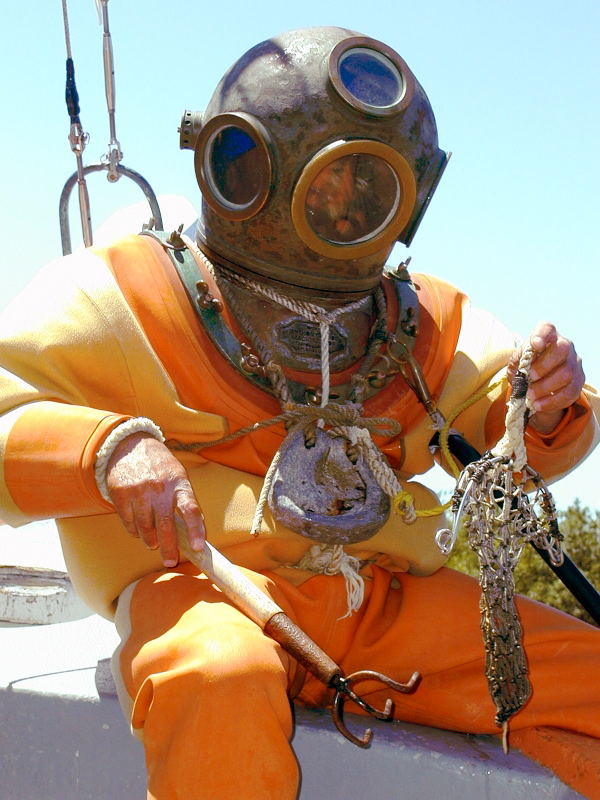
A sponge diver with weights slung over corselet on ropes, Tarpon Springs, Florida (1999)

There are two weight systems, both are still in use. The earlier helmet weights are used in pairs. The large horse-shoe type weights hold the buoyant helmet down and are suspended from the corselet by figure eight hooks that go over the breast plate weight studs. The Greek sponge divers simply joined the weights with ropes which went over the corselet like saddle bags. The other system is the weight harness, which is a usually a weight belt that fastens around the waist with shoulder straps which cross at the back and go over the breast plate at the shoulders, often with a crotch strap to prevent the harness from riding up when the diver works in tilted positions. The harness system puts the centre of gravity lower, for better upright stability, and prevents excessive weight shift when the diver must work in awkward positions, but still applies the ballast load to the buoyant helmet assembly when upright through the shoulder straps. The US Navy Mk V weight belt was of this style and weighed about 83 pounds (38 kg) but commercial belts were usually about 50 pounds (23 kg).

=== Weighted shoes ===
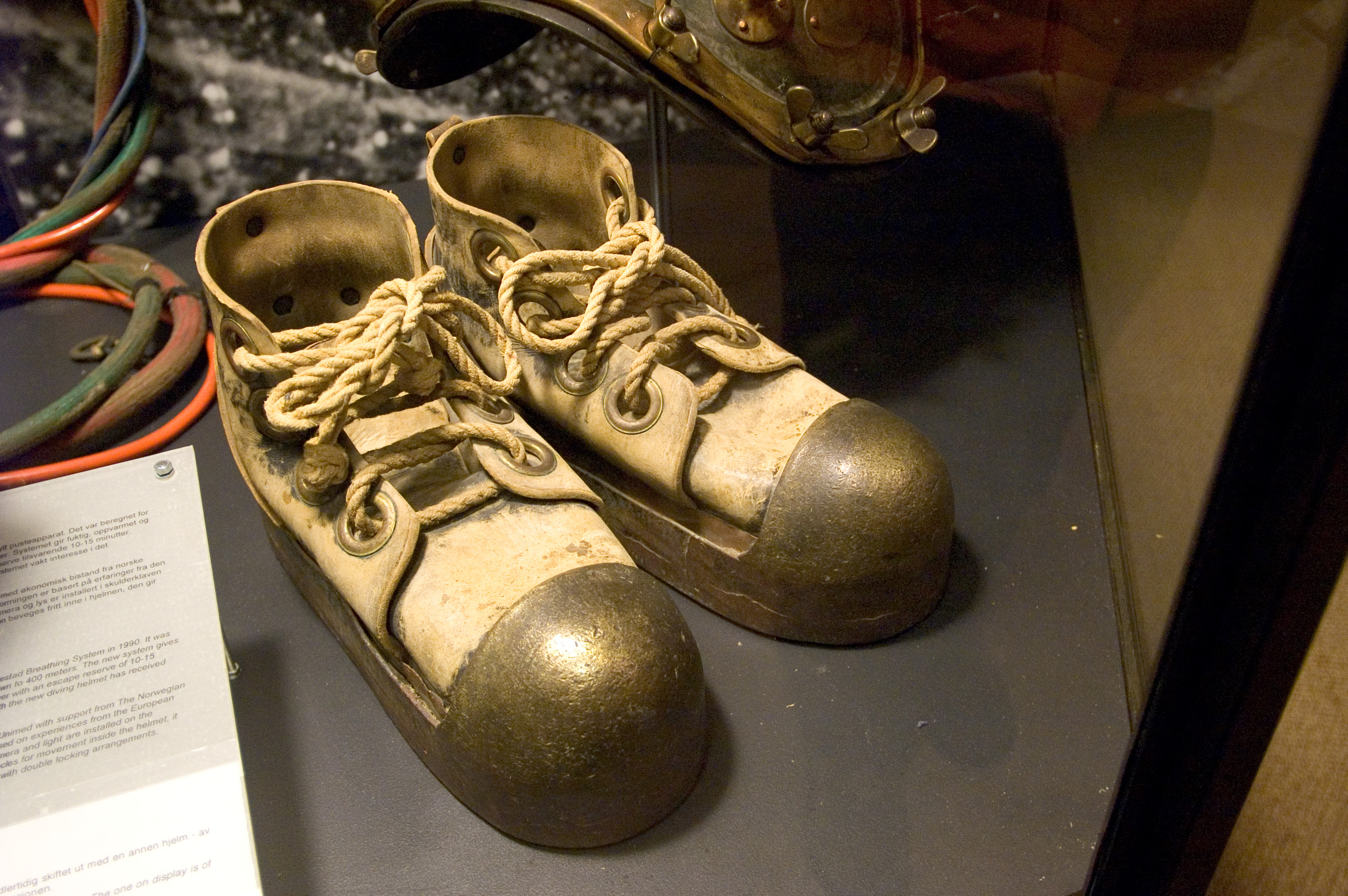
Weighted shoes

The helmet divers used heavily weighted shoes to steady them on the bottom. The weighted sole is bolted to a wooden insole, which in turn has a leather, canvas or rubber upper. Lead was the most common sole material, and a pair could weigh 34 pounds (15 kg) (more in the case of the US Navy Mark V mod 1 heliox equipment). Brass soled shoes with canvas uppers were introduced in WWII and are still in use. Some early brass shoes were called sandals because they were a casting held to the diver's feet by simple straps. Japanese divers often used iron soled shoes. The diver tends to lean forward against the drag of the water when walking on the bottom, and could often not see where they were putting their feet, so the toes are capped, usually with brass.

=== Diver's knife ===
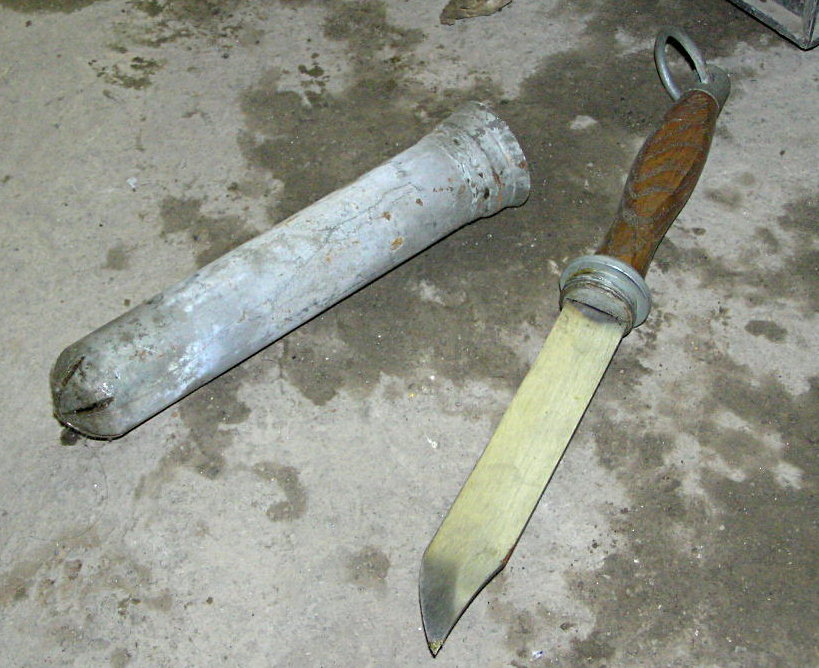
A diver's knife with screw thread retention

The diver's knife is a tool which is primarily intended for cutting away entanglement with ropes, lines and nets. It can also be used to some extent to pry and hammer, as well as cut, and may have a metal pommel for hammering, but the professional diver generally carries tools better suited to the work, and will use a hammer or pry-bar when that work is planned. The knife often has one side of the blade serrated to cut heavy material such as thick rope, and a sharper plain edge for cutting fine lines such as monofilament fishing line and nets. There are two common styles of traditional diver's knife sheaths; one is flat with a spring retention and the other has a circular section with an acme triple-start thread, allowing the diver to insert the knife in any orientation, rotate to engage the threads and lock the knife into the sheath.

=== Air supply ===
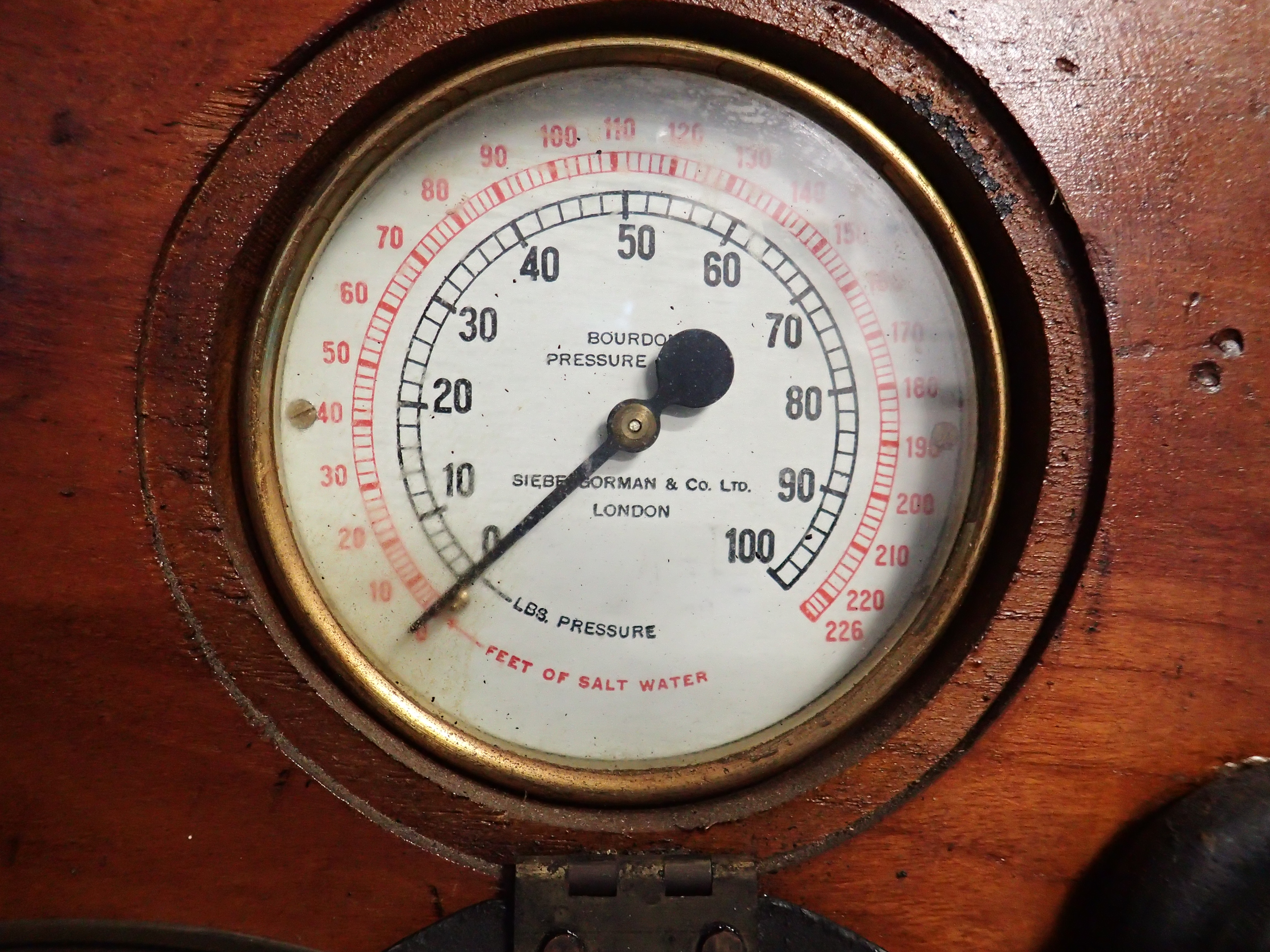
Pressure gauge on Siebe Gorman manual diver's pump, indicating delivered pressure in pounds per square inch (black) and feet sea water (red)

Originally supplied with air by a manually operated diver's air pump. Later also supplied by mechanised compressors, but the manual pump remained an option well into the 20th century. Air was supplied through a hose, and a rope strength member added to support the weight of the diver. Later a telephone cable was added and the diver's umbilical was the result of combining these items. Air supply passes through a non-return valve at the connection to the helmet, which prevents back flow if the hose is cut.

Flow of air through the helmet could be controlled by manually adjusting the back-pressure on the helmet exhaust valve, usually on the lower right side of the bonnet, and by manually adjusting the inlet supply valve on the airline, usually fastened to the front lower left of the corselet. Flow rate would also be affected by the surface delivery system and depth. Manual pumps would be operated at the speed necessary for sufficient air supply, which could be judged by delivery pressure and feedback from the diver. Many manual pumps had delivery pressure gauges calibrated in units of water depth - feet or metres of water column - which would provide the supervisor with a reasonable indication of diver depth.

==== Diver's air pump ====
Originally manually operated pumps were used to supply breathing air. Later air supply was also possible from powered compressors.

===== Manual systems =====
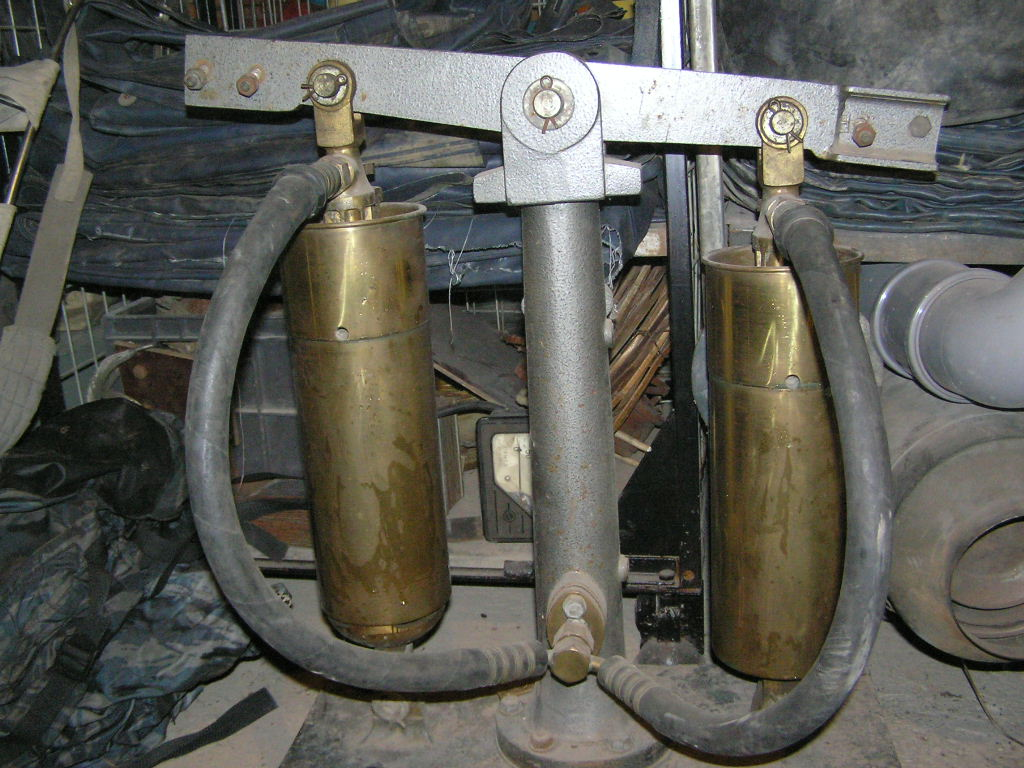
Two cylinder diver's pump made by Drägerwerk AG (Germany)

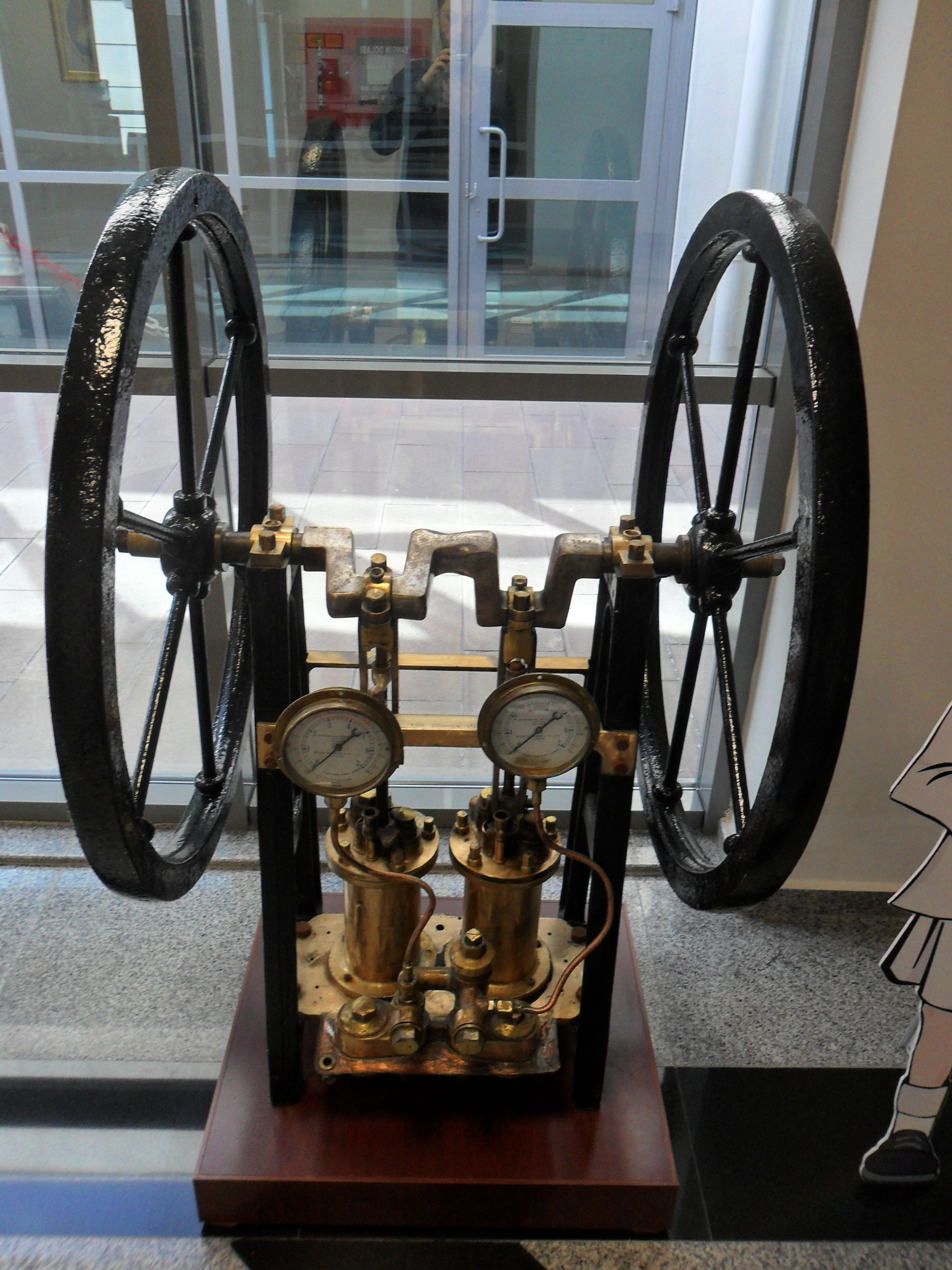
Manually operated diver's air pump, made by Siebe Gorman, UK

Three basic pump configurations were in common use. The most primitive was the bellows type, in which pressure was generated by pushing a lever back and forth, one stroke increasing the internal volume of the bellows, and the return stroke decreasing it. Non-return valves would allow air flow only in one direction, so the suction stroke would draw air into the bellows while the delivery valve prevented back-flow from the hose, and the delivery stroke would push air down the hose, with the inlet valve preventing leakage to the outside. Bellows pumps could be single action, where the delivery flow was interrupted during the intake stroke, or double action, where two bellows worked out of phase, the suction stroke of one coinciding with the delivery stroke of the other.

The lever action pump, with one or two cylinders and single or double ended lever, was a modification using pistons in cylinders in place of the bellows, but otherwise worked in the same way. Cranked pumps, with one to three cylinders, single or double action, were a development of cylinder pumps which used a crankshaft to drive the pistons, and handles on flywheels to operate the crankshaft. The use of flywheels, multiple cylinders and double-action cylinders would make it easier for the operators to produce a smooth airflow at relatively constant effort.

===== Powered compressors =====
Powered low pressure air compressors were also used to supply the diver with breathing air. The motive power could be anything available on the vessel, such as small internal combustion engines, hydraulic, steam or electrical power.

==== Air supply hose ====
- Air line: The earliest air hoses were made from leather, but by 1859 rubber was in use. Rubber was later used as a coating on a strength layer of woven fabric. This could be built up in layers to achieve the required strength to withstand the necessary internal pressure, which was proportional to the depth at which the diver worked.
- Umbilical: A diver's umbilical is a cable made up of all the required services to the diver. When used for later versions of standard diving dress this included the air hose, and usually also included a diver telephone cable, which could include a strength member capable of lifting the diver, and sometimes an electric power supply for one or more lights carried by the diver.

==== Air control valve ====
Most later suits had a screw-down air control valve on the air hose to control air flow rate into the helmet. The early helmets did not have air control valves and the diver signaled the surface with pulls on his rope or air line, indicating that they needed more or less air, and the pump operators would change the rate of pumping to suit.

=== Communications ===
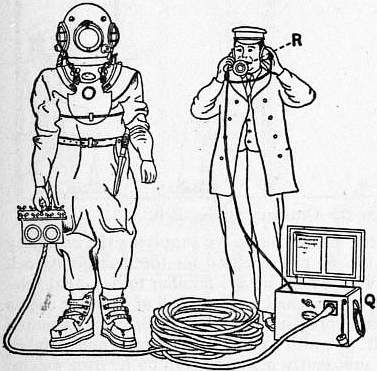
Diver telephone c.1911

The earliest form of communication between diver and surface was line signals, and this remains the standard for emergency signalling in the event of voice communications failure for surface-supplied and tethered scuba divers. Line signals involve a code of groups of long and short pulls on the lifeline, and a matching set of responses to indicate that the signal was received and understood. The system is limited but fairly robust. It can fail if there is a snag in the line.

Later, a speaking tube system, patented by Louis Denayrouze in 1874, was tried; this used a second hose with a diaphragm sealing each end to transmit sound, but it was not very successful. A small number were made by Siebe-Gorman, but the telephone system was introduced soon after this and since it worked better and was safer, the speaking tube was soon obsolete, and most helmets which had them were returned to the factory and converted.

In the early 20th century electrical telephone systems were developed which improved the quality of voice communication. These used wires incorporated into the lifeline or air line, and used either headsets worn inside the helmet or speakers mounted inside the helmet. The microphone could be mounted in the front of the helmet or a contact throat-microphone could be used. At first it was only possible for the diver to talk to the surface telephonist, but later double telephone systems were introduced which allowed two divers to speak directly to each other, while being monitored by the attendant. Diver telephones were manufactured by Siebe-Gorman, Heinke, Rene Piel, Morse, Eriksson, and Draeger among others.

== Variations ==
Two basic systems of attaching the helmet to the suit were in common use: In one style the perimeter of the corselet was clamped to a rubber gasket by up to 12 bolts, using brass brails to distribute the load and provide a reasonably even clamping pressure to make the watertight seal. In this style the bonnet to corselet seal was independent of the seal to the suit, and often used an interrupted thread system, which involved about a 45 degree rotation to engage the thread fully. The other type used a rubber flange which fitted over the neck hole of the corselet, and over which the bonnet was clamped, usually with two or three bolts. It was also fairly common to clamp the suit to the corselet edge by brails, and connect the helmet to the corselet by two three or four bolts, which could either be studs tapped into the corselet flange, or fold-away bolts hinged to the corselet, and engaged with slots in the helmet flange.

=== Three-bolt equipment ===
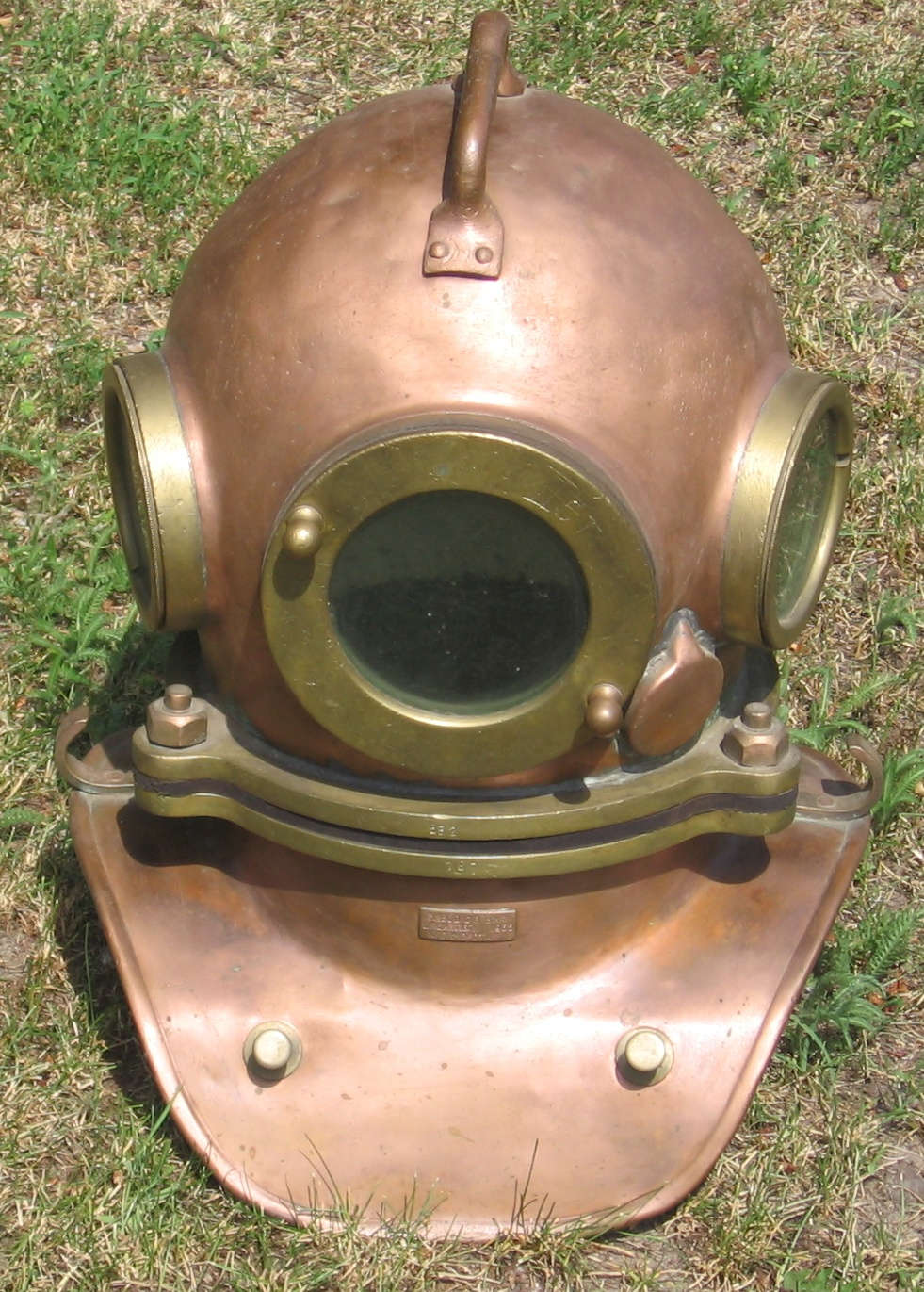
Russian three bolt helmet

Three bolt equipment, (Tryokhboltovoye snaryazheniye, Russian:Трехболтовое снаряжение, Russian:трехболтовка) consists of an air-hose supplied copper helmet that is fastened to a corselet and waterproof suit by three bolts which clamp the rubber neck flange of the suit between the metal flanges of the bonnet and the corselet, making a watertight seal between the helmet and suit., two 16 kilograms (35 lb) lead weights attached to the chest and back, heavy boots made of copper and lead, and a diver's knife.

Three bolt equipment was used by the Russian Navy in the 19th and 20th centuries.

Three-bolt equipment was also made in France by Denayrouze-Rouquayrol from 1874 or earlier, and in Germany by Draegerwerk from about 1912.

=== Twelve bolt equipment ===
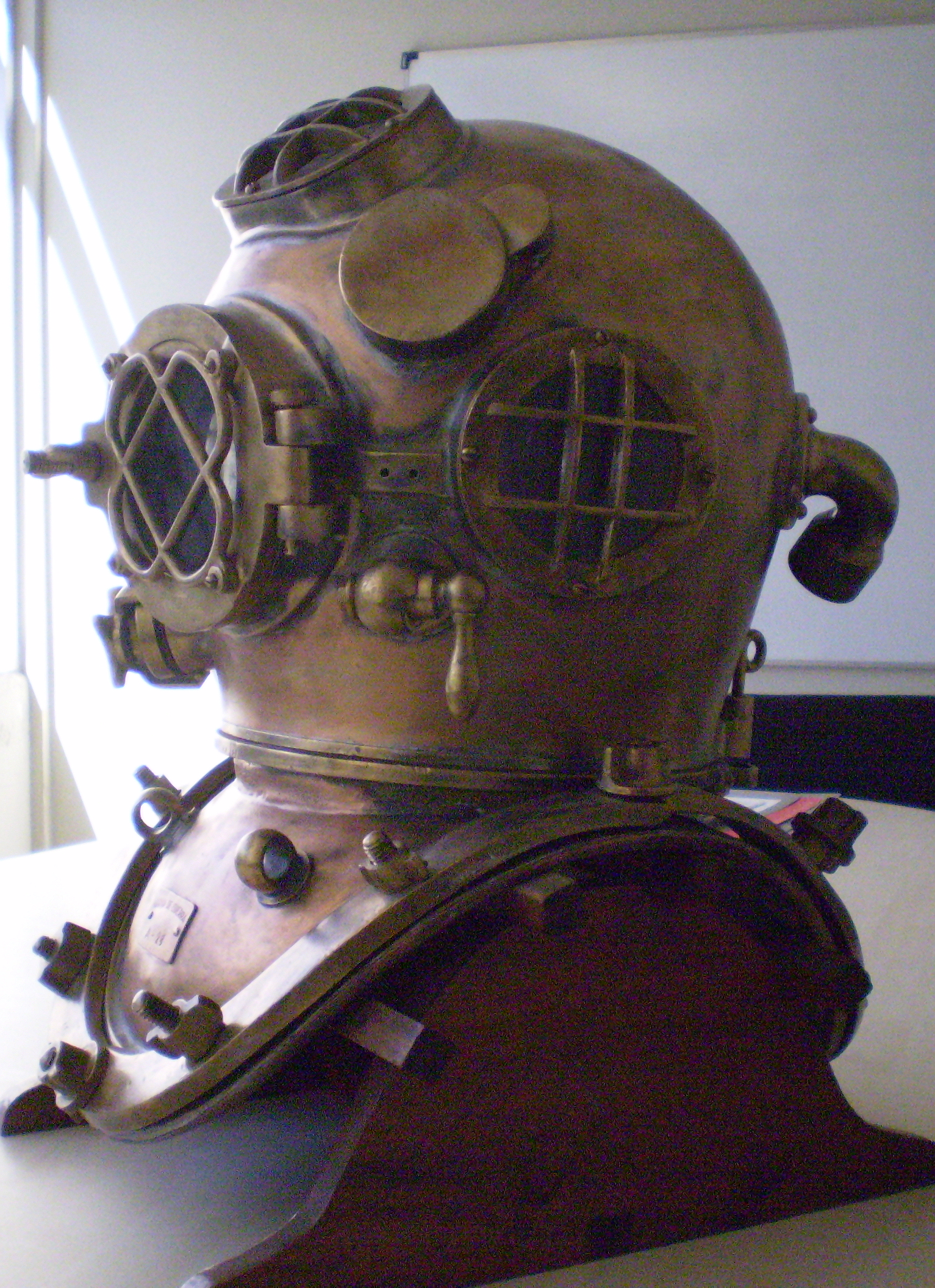
Twelve bolt helmet, showing the spit-cock

In twelve bolt equipment the rim of the corselet is clamped to the gasket of the suit, using brass brails to spread the load evenly.

Twelve bolt equipment was manufactured in the UK by Siebe-Gorman and Heinke, in France by Rouquayrol-Denayrouze, and in the US by several manufacturers for the US Navy.

==== US Navy Mk V equipment ====
The US Navy Mk V diving equipment was a standard military specification manufactured by several suppliers, including DESCO, Morse Diving, Miller–Dunn and A. Schräder's Son, over a fairly long period. The major components were: Spun copper and tobin bronze, 12 bolt, 4 light, 1/8 turn neck connection helmet with breastplate (corselet), clamps (brails) and wingnuts, weight 55 pounds (25 kg). Weight harness of lead weights on leather belt with adjustable shoulder straps and crotch strap, 84 pounds (38 kg). Lead soled boots with brass toe caps, canvas uppers with laces and leather straps weighing 17.5 pounds (7.9 kg) each. Suit weight 18.5 pounds (8.4 kg), for a total weight of approximately 190 pounds (86 kg). The Mk V equipment uses a 1/2" air hose with an external 1 1/16" x 17 submarine thread connection on the non-return valve.

=== Shallow-water helmets ===
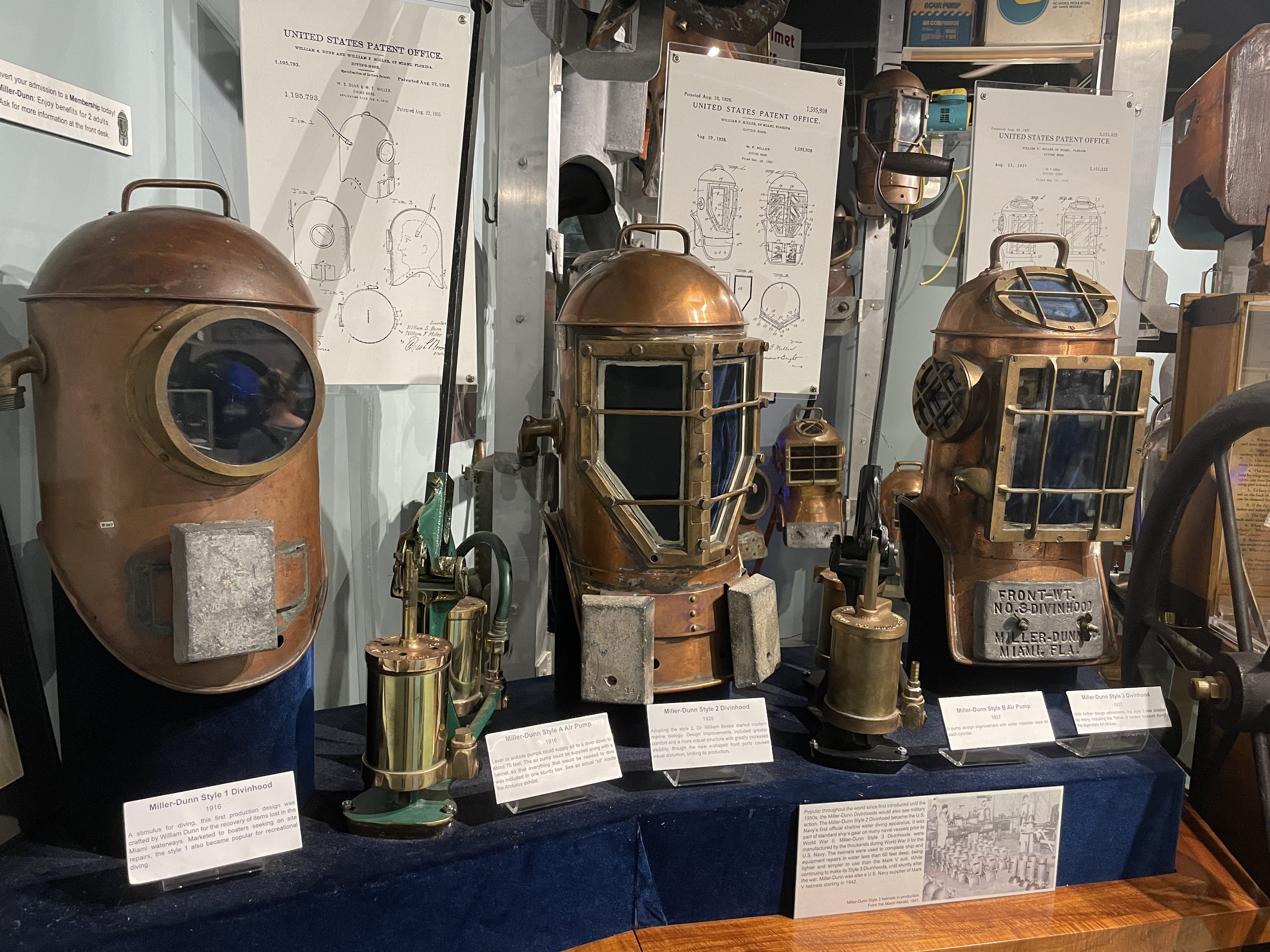
Three models of shallow water helmet by Miller-Dunn

Shallow water helmets are not standard diving dress, but were used by divers for shallow work where a dry suit was not required. Generally a shallow water helmet was a single item, which was lowered over the diver's head and rested on the shoulders, with an open bottom, so no exhaust valve was required. The helmet retained an air space as long as it was kept reasonably upright, and if the air spilled out it would refill as soon as the diver returned to an upright posture. It is held in place by gravity. The precursor to the standard helmet, Deane's helmet, was of this type. This type of equipment is only acceptably safe to use at depths where the diver can simply lift it off and make a free swimming ascent to the surface in an emergency.

=== Gas recirculation ===
Bernhard Dräger of Lübeck developed an injection system which used a high velocity injection of fresh gas into a divergent nozzle to entrain breathing gas in the loop of a rebreather to circulate the gas at without effort by the diver. By 1899 this had been developed to a stage where it could be used as a portable rebreather. By 1912 it had been developed into a system carried by a diver and used as a semi-closed diving rebreather with a copper helmet which did not need a mouthpiece. This was technically a self-contained underwater breathing apparatus based on the standard diving dress. The 1915 "bubikopf" helmet was a development from this, which used a characteristic overhang at the back of the helmet to keep the loop connections compact.

Competing rebreather systems were produced by Siebe-Gorman, & Co. in England, but were not as effective.

Draeger rebreather back-packs DM20 and DM40 were respectively for use with pure oxygen addition at depths not exceeding 20m, and for a combination of oxygen from one tank and air from the other at depths up to 40m. This combination system was effectively a nitrox system.

A small number of copper Heliox helmets were made for the US Navy by the Second World War. These helmets were Mk Vs modified by the addition of a bulky brass carbon dioxide scrubber chamber at the rear, and are easily distinguished from the standard model. The Mk V Helium weighs about 93 lb (42 kg) complete (bonnet, scrubber canister and corselet) These helmets and similar models manufactured by Kirby Morgan, Yokohama Diving Apparatus Company and DESCO used the scrubber as a gas extender, a form of semi-closed rebreather system, where helmet gas was circulated through the scrubber by entraining the helmet gas in the flow from an injector supplying fresh gas, a system pioneered by Dräger in 1912.

=== Demand systems ===
The Frenchman Benoît Rouquayrol patented a breathing apparatus in 1860 for firefighting and use in mines, which used a demand regulator similar in principle to the demand valves later used for open-circuit scuba equipment and eventually lightweight demand helmets. In 1864, after collaboration with Auguste Denayrouze of the French navy, the apparatus was modified for underwater use, originally without a helmet, but later adapted for use with standard copper helmets.

=== Mixed gas systems ===
Besides the Dräger DM40 nitrox rebreather system, the US Navy developed a variant of the Mark V system for heliox diving. These were successfully used during the rescue of the crew and salvage of the USS Squalus in 1939. The US Navy Mark V Mod 1 heliox mixed gas helmet is based on the standard Mark V Helmet, with a scrubber canister mounted on the back of the helmet and an inlet gas injection system which recirculates the breathing gas through the scrubber to remove carbon dioxide and thereby conserve helium. The helium helmet uses the same breastplate as a standard Mark V except that the locking mechanism is relocated to the front, there is no spitcock, there is an additional electrical connection for heated underwear, and on later versions a two or three-stage exhaust valve was fitted to reduce the risk of flooding the scrubber. The gas supply at the diver was controlled by two valves. The "Hoke valve" controlled flow through the injector to the "aspirator" which circulated gas from the helmet through the scrubber, and the main control valve used for bailout to open circuit, flushing the helmet, and for extra gas when working hard or descending. Flow rate of the injector nozzle was nominally 0.5 cubic foot per minute at 100 psi above ambient pressure, which would blow 11 times the volume of the injected gas through the scrubber. A similar heliox extender helmet was built by Kirby Morgan from 1965, later supplied by Yokohama Diving Apparatus. A cylindrical scrubber canister was permanently mounted on the back of the helmet and loaded with a pre-packed carbon dioxide absorbent cartridge from the inside of the helmet.

== Accessories ==
A few accessories were produced that are specific to Standard diving dress, though similar items are available for other diving systems.

Welding visors were made that clamp over the front viewport of the copper helmet. These would have to be made for a specific model helmet as the details of size and shape could vary considerably.

Oil resistant suits were produced once oil-resistant synthetic rubbers became available to coat the exterior of the suit.

Wrist mount diving compasses and watches, and diving lights, are not restricted to use with standard diving equipment, but were produced for use by divers wearing the equipment before other diving equipment became generally available. Underwater lights included hand held torches with a directed beam, and lantern styles, with all-round illumination, and lamps designed to be mounted off the diver to illuminate the work site.

T-spanners (wrenches) and straight spanners for tightening and loosening the wingnuts of the helmet were available from the helmet manufacturers to suit the pattern of wingnut used by the manufacturer.

Cuff expanders were available to allow the diver's attendants to assist the diver to get his hands out of the rubber cuff seals.

Diver telephone systems were commonly used.

Air control panels were required when power driven compressors were used. These varied in complexity, and were available for one or two divers.

== Dressing the diver in and out ==
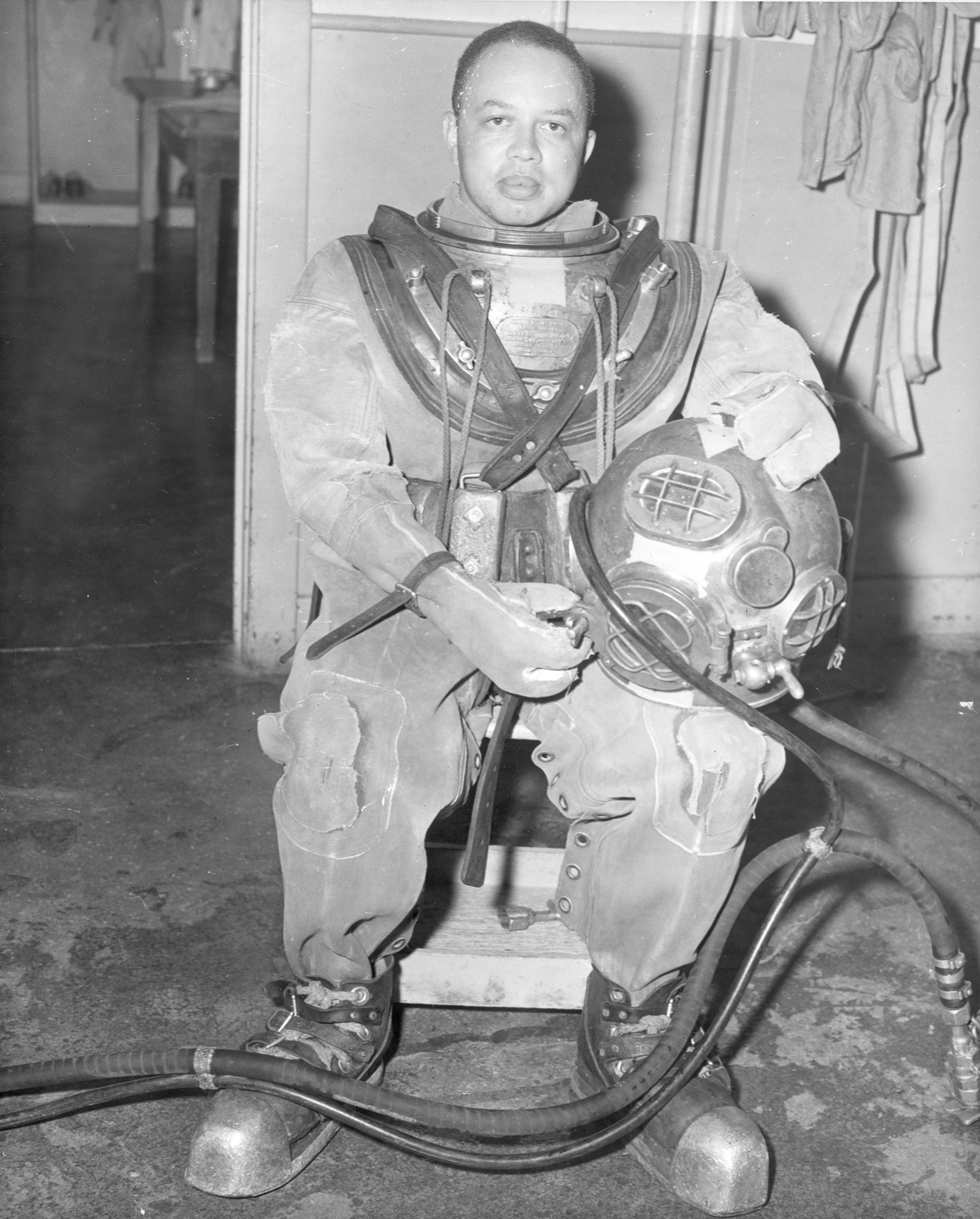
Diver dress, except for helmet, worn by Emerson Emory while serving in the US Naval Reserve c.1950

The standard diving dress requires an assistant to help with dressing in and out. The cuff seals need an assistant to hold them open to remove the hands. Where lacing is needed, the diver cannot comfortably reach the laces. The corselet seal, fitting of the bonnet and weights are all cumbersome and heavy, and parts cannot be reached by the diver or require inspection from outside. The equipment is heavy and the field of vision restricted, so for safety the diver needs assistance and guidance when moving around with the helmet in place.

=== Pre-dive checks ===
Before use the equipment would be checked: The air-supply non-return valve would be tested for leaks, the exhaust valve for spring tension and seal, and smooth action of the chin button, the viewport glass and the faceplate seal for good condition, the spitcock for smooth action and sufficient friction, the locking latch for the helmet thread is working, the bonnet seal gasket is lubricated, the studs secure and wingnuts turn freely, and the brails, helmet and breastplate are a matching set (same serial number) and fit properly. The air supply valve would be checked that it has enough friction to be easily turned by the diver, but not be easily changed by accidental bumps. Other items would be visually inspected to ensure there were no apparent defects. Inspection and testing of the air supply was a separate procedure, which would be done before dressing in the diver.

=== Dressing in ===
Standard practice in the US Navy was for two attendants to dress in the diver. In other circumstances one would be considered sufficient. A standardised order of dressing in would generally be followed, as this is less likely to allow errors. Details would vary for other styles of helmet and weighting system: The diver would put on whatever thermal protective clothing was considered appropriate for the planned dive, then pull on the suit, assisted by the tenders where appropriate. Soapy water might be used to assist getting the hands through the rubber cuff seals where present. The tenders laced up the back of the legs where this is needed, and made sure the lace ends were tucked away. The tenders would then fit the weighted shoes, lacing them securely and buckling over the laces. A tender would then place the breastplate cushion on the diver's shoulders and pull the suit bib over it. A tender would then lower the breastplate over the diver's head, pull the rubber seal over the rim and pull the bib into place in the neck opening. Most of the loose cloth of the bib would be folded round the back of the head. The rubber seal would be worked into place over the studs and smoothed down in preparation for clamping. The washers would be placed over the studs which would take the brail joints to protect against tearing and ensure even clamping pressure. The brails would be placed in the correct positions, and wingnuts fitted. The wingnuts intended for use at the brail joints could be identified by having wider flanges. The nuts would be tightened down evenly to ensure a good seal, first by hand, then using the appropriate wrench. After this a tender would remove the lower left front nut where the air supply valve link would later be fitted.

The US Navy system used a weight belt with shoulder straps. Other systems of weighting would be fitted differently. The tenders would bring the weight belt to the diver from the front and pass the shoulder straps round the divers arms and in place over the top of the breastplate, crossing at the front and back. The belt was then buckled at the back and the crotch strap buckled to the belt in front, tensioned sufficiently to ensure that the helmet assembly would stay in place during the dive. If the suit had integral gloves, wrist straps would be fitted to prevent over-inflation, otherwise protective rubber covers (snappers) would be fitted over the wrist seal ends.

Before fitting the helmet, the air supply would be connected and running, and the telephone connected and tested. The helmet would be lowered over the diver's head, turned to the left to allow it to drop between the interrupted neck threads, and rotated to the right to engage the threads. As soon as the helmet is in place the faceplate would be opened for communication, then the locking mechanism secured. Next the lifeline would be secured to the breastplate, and the air supply valve link clamped on using the wingnut removed earlier for this purpose. The diver would then test the air supply and telephone and a tender would set the exhaust valve to the standard setting. The last item before consigning the diver to the water was closing and securing the faceplate.

After the dive, equipment would be removed in roughly the reverse order. Removing the hands from the wrist seals could be facilitated by inserting special cuff expanders, smooth curved metal plates with handles, which could be slid under the rubber cuff seal along the sides of the wrist, then the tenders could pull then away from each other to stretch the seal enough for the diver to remove his hand more easily.

== Diving procedures ==
- Water entry and exit was usually either by a substantial ladder or by lowering the diver into the water and lifting him out on a small platform with handholds known as a diving stage. In earlier days less ergonomically desirable methods have been used, like rope ladders.
- The usual method of descent was for the diver to descend on a shotline. The diver would establish negative buoyancy while holding the line at the surface, then slide down the line, braking as required by holding on with his hands or using a wrap of the shotline round a leg, and with descent speed limited by the tender, who would pay out the umbilical at an appropriate speed. If it was necessary to ascend a bit to assist with ear clearing, the tender could assist on request. Speed of descent was limited by the necessity to equalise and the available flow rate of air to maintain internal volume to avoid suit and helmet squeeze, and adequate exhaust flow to keep carbon dioxide levels down.
- Depth monitoring could be done by monitoring the pressure of the supply air at the pump or panel, which would be slightly greater than the air pressure inside the suit and helmet due to friction losses in the hose. Pressure inside the suit would be the effective depth pressure as this was the pressure of air the diver would be breathing.
- Buoyancy control. The diver controlled buoyancy by adjusting the back pressure of the exhaust valve. The helmet and suit air space were continuous, so air would fill the suit until the deeper parts of the suit exerted sufficient additional pressure to cause the exhaust valve to open. In some helmets, such as the US Navy helmets, the exhaust valve spring pressure could be temporarily overridden by pressing the inside end with the chin to dump or pulling it with the lips to raise the pressure. Longer term adjustments were made by turning the knob on the outside to adjust spring setting. Air volume in the suit would be strongly influenced by posture. Head-up vertical posture was the normal position, and any change from this would require some adjustment of back-pressure to prevent excessive air volume in the suit, which in extreme cases could prevent the diver from reaching control valves, and could lead to a runaway buoyant ascent. Working buoyancy at depth would normally be slightly to considerably negative, known as "diving heavy". Ascent and descent were done slightly negative, and, where necessary, moving around at the surface would be done buoyant.
- Flushing and flow rate control. Flow rate of the air supply was adjusted to provide sufficient air for the diver depending on work rate. When air was provided by manual cranking of the pump, it was not desirable to overdo the air supply, as this was unnecessary work for the pump crew. If the diver started building up carbon dioxide by working harder than the air supply could compensate, they could either rest for a while, ask for increased flow rate, control the flow rate at the supply valve, or a combination of these options.A 30-second flush on reaching the bottom was a standard procedure for US Navy divers.This would relieve carbon dioxide buildup caused by low exhaust flow during compression.
- Demisting the viewports: Some helmets directed inlet air flow over the inside face of the viewports, which was reasonably effective, but if this was not sufficient, the diver could open the spitcock and suck seawater into his mouth, then spit it onto the inside of a fogged viewport. This would wash off the condensation droplets, and the saliva may have helped defogging, as it is known to be effective as a surfactant for this purpose.
- Ascent: The diver prepared for ascent by setting slightly negative buoyancy so that the tender could pull him up easily and with control of the speed. The diver could hold onto the shotline to control position and speed to some extent.
- Decompression: During the ascent the diver was often required to do in-water decompression stops, which were usually done at constant depth while holding onto the shotline.
- Emergency recompression: If the diver developed symptoms of decompression sickness after surfacing it was possible to treat it by returning the diver to depth in the suit and decompressing more slowly. There was some significant risk to this procedure, but in remote areas such as the pearl shell grounds off northern Australia, it was often the only method of effective treatment available.

=== Diver training ===
Around 1943, the US Navy training course for Diver 1st class at the diving school was for 20 weeks. This included theory, work skills and diving with several types of equipment, including the Mark V Mod 1 helmet. Theory subjects listed in the syllabus included:

- Caisson disease – Cause and treatment
- Theory of welding
- Care and upkeep of suits, helmets and attachments
- Diving pumps; care, upkeep, computation of diver air supply and tests of equipment
- Telephones; care and upkeep of various types, elementary theory of circuits, practical work in overhaul, vacuum tube amplification of primary circuit.
- Velocity power tools, practical work
- Bureau of Ships Diving Manual
- Salvage methods and equipment
- Oxygen rescue breathing apparatus; care and maintenance
- Submarine escape apparatus "lung"; care and maintenance

Practical training included dives in the pressure tank up to 300fsw, practical work training including searches and hull cleaning, cutting and welding, and use of the oxygen rescue and submarine escape apparatus.

=== Diving manuals ===
The US Navy has provided a diving manual for training and operational guidance since 1905:

- 1905 - Manual for Divers - Handbook for Seaman Gunners, published by the Naval Torpedo Station, printed in Washington, DC. The book had seven chapters: Requirement of divers; Description of Diving Apparatus; Accidents That May Happen; Rules for Resuscitation; Signals; Duties of the Person in Charge of the Diver and of the Divers Tenders and Assistants; Preparation and Operation of App[aratus; Method of Instruction; Care and Preservation of Apparatus; Diving Outfit; Pressure at Different Depths.
- 1916 - U.S. Navy Diving Manual, published by the Navy Department, Washington Government Printing Office. Intended for use as an instruction manual as well as for general use.
- 1924 - U.S. Navy Diving Manual – a reprint of Chapter 36 of the Manual of the Bureau of Construction & Repair, Navy Department, which was responsible for US Navy Diving research and development at the time.
- 1943 - U.S. Navy Diving Manual, published by the Navy Department, Bureau of Ships, to supersede the 1924 manual. The book has 21 chapters on all aspects of US Navy diving at the time, including diving on Heliox mixtures, which was a new development. The main focus was on the US Navy Mk V helmet, a typical free-flow copper helmet used with standard diving dress, but shallow water diving equipment is also covered.
- 1952 - U.S. Navy Diving Manual, document identity NAVSHIPS 250–880, also published by the Navy Department, Bureau of Ships, to supersede the 1943 manual. It has nine parts: History and Development of Diving, Basic Principles of Diving, Diving Equipment, Diving Procedures, Medical Aspects of Diving, Diving with Helium-Oxygen Mixtures, Summary of Safety Precautions, Diving Accidents, and Component Parts of Standard Diving Equipment.
- 1959 - U. S. Navy Diving Manual, document NAVSHIPS 250–538, published by the Navy Department, Bureau of Ships to supersede the 1952 manual. This manual is in four parts: General Principles of Diving, Surface Supplied Diving, Self Contained Diving, and Diving Accessories.
- 1963 - U.S. Navy Diving Manual, document NAVSHIPS 250–538, published by the Navy Department, Bureau of Ships. In three parts: General Principles of Diving, Surface Supplied Diving, which refers to standard dress diving, including the use of Helium-Oxygen mixtures, and Self Contained Diving.

Later revisions of the U.S. Navy Diving Manual do not refer to the Mark V equipment.

The Royal Navy originally used the Siebe-Gorman diving manual. Siebe-Gorman was the manufacturer of the standard diving dress used by the RN at the time.

- 1904 – Manual for Divers: With Information and Instruction in the Use of Siebe, Gorman & Co's Diving Apparatus as Used in H. M. Service. Royal Navy Manual G. 14063/04, published by the British Admiralty in 1904. It has chapters covering: Courses of Instruction in Diving, Description of the Apparatus, Directions for Dressing and Working, Practical Hints on Diving, and Temporary Repairs by Divers.
- 1907 – Manual for Divers: Royal Navy Manual G.4358/07, published by the British Admiralty to supersede the 1904 manual. It has chapters covering: Description of the apparatus, its care and maintenance, with rules for testing the pump; The physics and physiology of diving; Dressing the diver and sending him down, and duties of the officer in charge of the diving party; and Hints for the diver and methods of doing work.
- 1910 – Manual for Divers: Royal Navy Manual G.14251/1909, published by the Admiralty in December 1909 to supersede the 1907 manual. It has chapters covering: Description of the apparatus, its care and maintenance, with rules for testing the pump; The physics and physiology of diving; Dressing the diver, attendance and signals; The management of diving, duties of the officer in charge, and rules as to time and coming up; Hints for the diver, and methods for doing work; First aid to the diver in cases of accident; The Hall Rees apparatus; Extracts from regulations, orders concerning divers, and appendices on "Schedules of gear allowed for one and two divers". The 1910 addenda contains instructions for the use of the recompression chamber for divers.
- 1916 – Diving Manual: Royal Navy Manual G. 24974/16, published by the British Admiralty to supersede the 1910 manual. The chapters covered: Description of the apparatus, its care and maintenance with rules for testing the pump; The physics and physiology of diving; Dressing the diver, attendance and signals; The management of diving, duties of the officer in charge, rules as to time and coming up, and Tables I and II; Hints for the diver and methods of doing work; Treatment of caisson disease by recompression and by sending the diver down again, and first aid to the diver in case of accidents. Pattern No. 200 smoke helmet and shallow water diving equipment; Extracts from regulations, orders &c., concerning divers.
- 1936 – The Diving Manual BR155/1936, published by the British Admiralty from 1936 superseded the 1916 manual. The chapters covered: Description of the apparatus, its care and maintenance with rules for testing the pump; The physics and physiology of diving; Dressing the diver, attendance and signals, The management of diving, duties of the officer in charge, rules for decompression in depth up to 200 feet; Hints for the diver and methods of doing work; Diving in deep water using the Davis Submerged Decompression Chamber; Compressed air illness and accidents to the diver; Pneumatic tools and underwater cutting apparatus; Breathing Apparatus Pattern 230 and Oxygen Breathing Apparatus; Orders and regulations concerning divers.
- 1943 – Royal Navy Diving Manual BR155/1943, published by the British Admiralty to supersede BR155/1936. The chapters covered: The physics of diving and their effect on the human body; Description of the apparatus, its care and maintenance; Dressing the diver, attendance and signals;4 Practical work underwater, The management of diving, duties of the officer in charge, rules for decompression in depths up to 200 feet; Diving in deep water, using the Davis Submerged Decompression Chamber, Compressed air illness and accidents to the diver; Under-water tools and tubular construction; Breathing Apparatus Pattern 230 and Oxygen Breathing Apparatus; Orders and regulation concerning divers.
- Royal Navy Diving Manual BR155C/1956, published by the British Admiralty to supersede BR155/1943. Printed as a set of softback booklets in a hard binder, the 8 parts were: The Theory of Diving (1956); Diving Regulations (1956); Self-Contained Diving (1957); Standard Diving (1956); Deep Diving (1957); Practical Diving (1956); Marine Salvage (1960); and Diver's Loudspeaker Intercommunication Equipment (1958).
- Royal Navy Diving Manual BR 155/1964, published by the British Admiralty to supersede BR155/1956, in a loose leaf ring binder. The 8 parts were: Diving Regulations; The Theory of Diving; Ship and Clearance Diving; Surface and Submersible Chambers; Practical Diving; Marine Salvage; Standard Diving; Diver's Loudspeaker Intercommunication Equipment.
- 1972 – BR 2806 Diving Manual, published by the Ministry of Defence, Weapons Department (Naval) in a loose leaf spring clip binder. The 7 sections cover: Theory of Diving; Regulations; Conduct of Diving Operations; Breathing Apparatus, Drill and Operation; Decompression; Divers’ Illnesses and Injuries; and Civilian and Expedition Diving; This is the last RN manual covering standard diving equipment.

== Specific hazards ==
Most of the hazards to which the standard diver was exposed are much the same as those to which any other surface supplied diver is exposed, but there were a few significant exceptions due to the equipment configuration.

Helmet squeeze is an injury that could occur if the air supply hose was ruptured near or above the surface. The pressure difference between the water around the diver and the air in the hose can then be several bar. The non-return valve at the connection to the helmet will prevent backflow if it is working correctly, but if absent, as in the early days of helmet diving, or if it fails, the pressure difference between the diver depth and the break in the hose will tend to squeeze the diver into the rigid helmet, which can result in severe, sometimes fatal, trauma. The same effect can result from a large and rapid increase in depth if the air supply is insufficient to keep up with the increase in ambient pressure. This could occur if the diver fell off a support when there was a lot of slack in the lifeline, or the angle of the lifeline allowed horizontal distance to swing to vertical distance.

Suit blowup occurs when the diving suit is inflated to the point at which the buoyancy lifts the diver faster than they can vent the suit to reduce buoyancy sufficiently to break the cycle of ascent induced expansion. A blowup can also be induced if air is trapped in areas which are temporarily higher than the helmet exhaust valve, such as if the feet are raised and trap air. A blowup can surface the diver at a dangerous rate, and the risk of lung over-pressure injury is relatively high. Risk of decompression sickness is also raised depending on the pressure profile to that point. Blowup can occur for several reasons. Loss of ballast weight is another cause of buoyancy gain which may not be possible to compensate by venting. The standard diving suit can inflate during a blowup to the extent that the diver cannot bend his arms to reach the valves, and the over-pressure can burst the suit, causing a complete loss of air, and the diver sinking to the bottom to drown.

The standard diving system had no self contained alternative breathing gas supply. It was possible to switch out air supply hoses underwater, and the air already in the suit and helmet was usually sufficient to keep the diver conscious during the time required to disconnect the old hose and connect the new one, but this procedure could only work if the original hose was still providing an air supply. A severed or blocked hose could not be successfully managed.

== Manufacturers ==
Standard diving equipment was widely produced over a long period. Manufacturers are listed here in alphabetical order of country:

- Brazil:
  - Charles Person, of São Paulo.
- Canada:
  - John Date, of Montreal.
- Denmark: There was a particular style of corselet rim sealing clamp used in Danish service patented by Peter Hansen Hessing and built under license by various manufacturers, which used only two clamping bolts.
- East Germany:
  - Medi. 3-bolt helmets
- France:
  - Rouquayrol–Denayrouze, later Specialites Mecaniques Reunis, then Societe Charles Petit, eventually Rene Piel (several name changes) manufactured both 3-bolt and 12-bolt helmets, and both demand and free-flow air supply systems. Trademarks include Rene Piel of Paris, C H Petit, of Paris.
  - Scauda, of Mareilles.
- Germany:
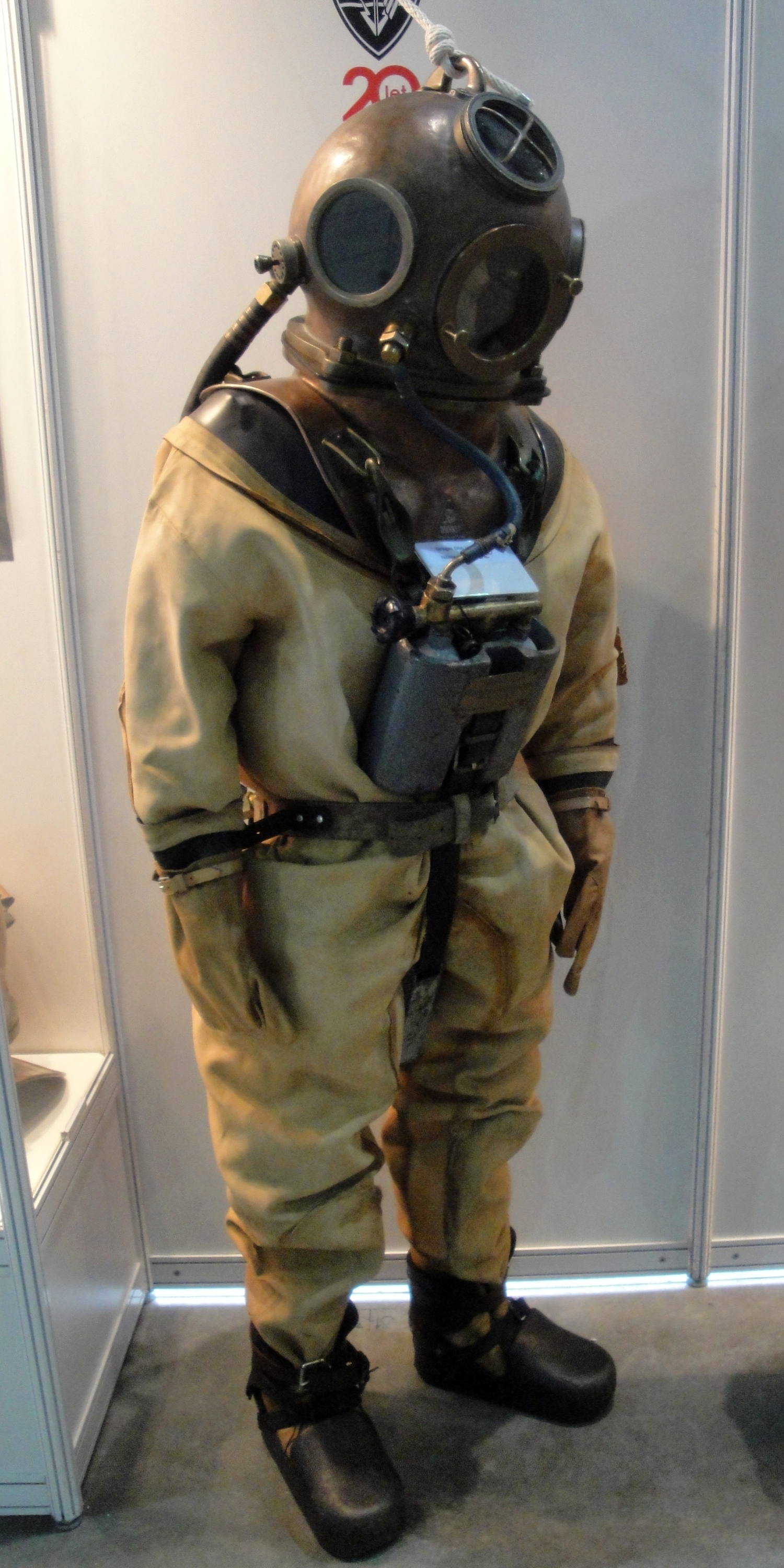
  Dräger DM 20
  - Clouth Gummiwerke AG of Cöln Nippes.
  - Dräger & Gerling, Lubeck, Established 1889. In 1902 name changed to Drägerwerk, Heinr. & Bernh. Dräger. Draegerwerk produced both rebreather and free-flow helmets.
  - Friedrich Flohr, Kiel. Established 1890. Manufactured apparatus of Denayrouze type with three-bolt helmets and regulator backpacks. Later also produced free-flow helmets.
- Netherlands:
  - Bikkers of Rotterdam
- Italy:
  - Galeazzi of La Spezia, (including helmets for mixed gas),
  - IAC,
  - SALVAS (Società Anonima Lavorazioni Vari Appararecchi di Salvataggio), manufactured mostly military salvage equipment, including diving helmets.
- Japan:
  - Kimura (Nagasaki iron works),
  - Yokohama Diving Apparatus Company, (helium rebreather)
- Korea:
  - Pusan.
- Russia: 3-bolt, 6-bolt and 12-bolt/3-bolt helmets, including helium helmets.
- Spain:
  - Nemrod,
- Sweden: Some of the Swedish helmets were of the "inverted pot" form, with a substantially cylindrical bonnet with a rounded top.
  - Erik Andersson of Stockholm,
  - Emil Carlsson of Stockholm,
  - C.A. Lindqvist of Stockholm,
  - Marinverkst of Karlskrona,
- United Kingdom: Leading British manufacturers were Siebe Gorman and Heinke. Siebe Gorman manufactured a wide range of models over several years, including 12-bolt oval and square corselets, 6-bolt oval corselets. 3 or 4 lights, usually with screw in front window, with tinned or copper finish and round or oval side windows. Over their production period they used at least two styles of wingnut, and a rebreather model. Occasionally more unusual options were chosen, such as 8 bolt corselets. No-bolt model used similar rubber flange to 3-bolt helmets, but clamped between the bonnet and corselet which were connected at the back by a hinge and the helmet swung forward over the head to close, and locked by a clamp in front with a locking device to prevent inadvertent opening.
- In the United States, the dominant makers were four companies which produced Mark V diving helmets for the US Navy: Diving Equipment and Salvage Co. (later Diving Equipment Supply Co.) of Milwaukee, Wisconsin (DESCO), Morse Diving Equipment Company of Boston, Massachusetts, Miller-Dunn Diving Co. of Miami, Florida and A Schräder's Son of Brooklyn, New York. Among others, Morse Diving Equipment of Boston produced the Mark V Helium MOD 1 rebreather helmet. Some Morse helmets had the air intake on the back of the corselet. While the Mark V is a US Navy design and all helmets should have been identical, models from Morse, Schräder, DESCO, and Miller Dunn all had differences. Brails from a Miller Dunn are difficult to fit on another maker's helmet. Early Miller Dunn Mark V helmets had gussets on the interior radius of the air and communication elbows. Schräder Mark V helmets used yellow brass castings instead of red brass like other makers. Schräder also canted their spitcock body. The standard Mk V weighs approximately 55 lb (25 kg) complete. The US Navy Mk V helmet is still in production to order. In 2016 DESCO Corporation purchased the assets of Morse Diving International and began producing Morse helmets under the A. J. Morse and Son brand. The US Navy Mark V Helmet is available in either make with the minor manufacturing differences intact

== In popular culture ==
English charity fundraiser Lloyd Scott has dressed in standard diving dress for many of his events, especially marathons.

== See also ==
- History of underwater diving – Developments over time in the human activity
- Surface-supplied diving – Underwater diving breathing gas supplied from the surface
- Timeline of diving technology – Chronological list of notable events in the history of underwater diving equipment
