= Waghorn =

Waghorn is a surname. Notable people with the surname include:

- Alex Waghorn (born 1995), English former first-class cricketer
- Alexander de Waghorn (died 1418?), Roman Catholic Bishop of Ross
- Ben Waghorn (born 2004), English rugby union footballer
- Dominic Waghorn, British journalist
- Eduardo Waghorn (born 1966), Chilean musician and composer
- Frances Waghorn (1950–1994), English figure skater
- H. T. Waghorn (1842–1930), English cricket statistician and historian
- Kathy Waghorn (born 1970), New Zealand architectural academic
- Kerry Waghorn (born 1947), Canadian syndicated caricaturist
- Leslie Waghorn (1906–1979), English cricketer
- Martin Waghorn (died 1787), officer of the Royal Navy
- Martyn Waghorn (born 1990), English football striker
- Richard Waghorn (1904–1931), English aviator, Royal Air Force pilot, and 1929 Schneider Trophy seaplane race winner
- Thomas Fletcher Waghorn (1800–1850), English sailor, naval officer, and postal pioneer

== See also ==
- Miss Waghorn, a character in The Starlight Express
