= HMS Royal George (1756) =

First-rate ship of the line of the Royal Navy

Coordinates: 50°45′26″N 1°06′45″W

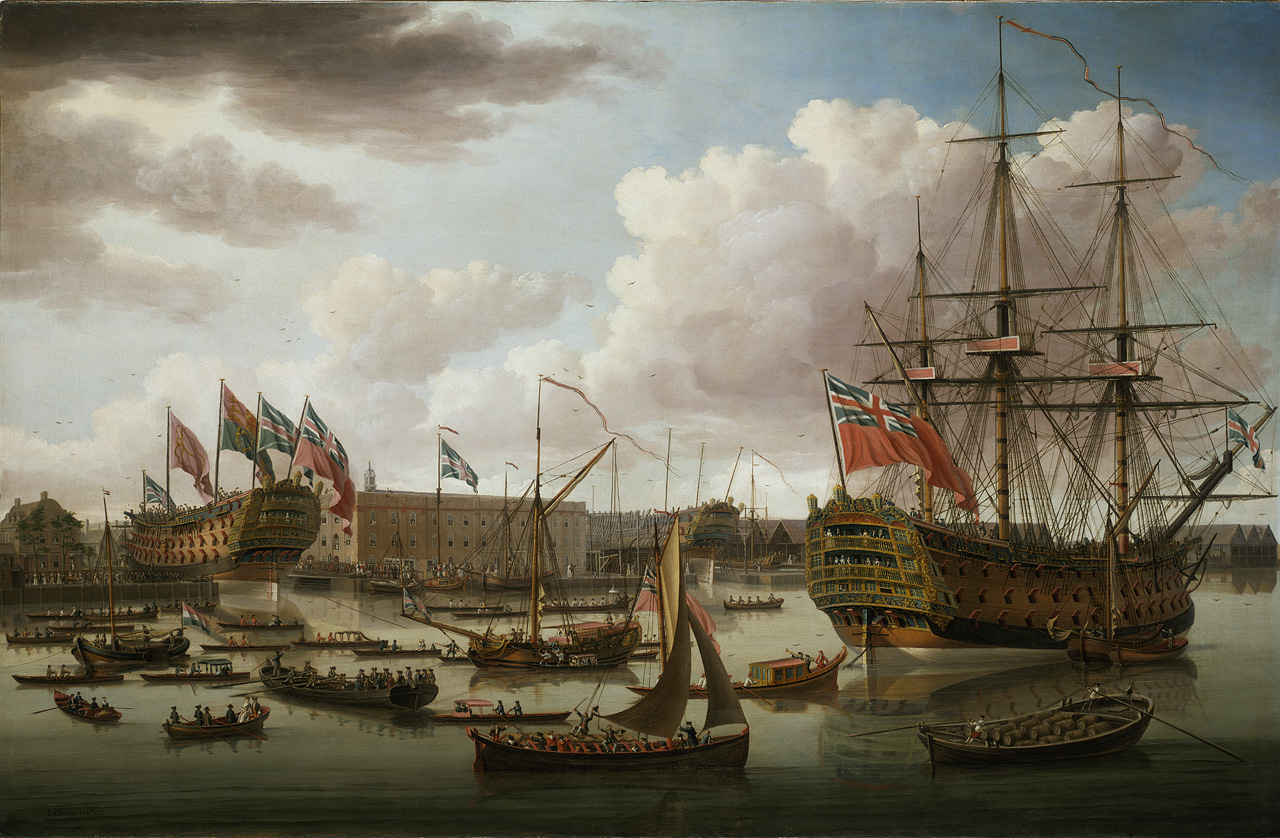
- 1757 painting of Royal George (right)

History

Great Britain
- Name: HMS Royal George
- Ordered: 29 August 1746
- Builder: Woolwich Dockyard
- Laid down: 8 January 1747
- Launched: 18 February 1756
- Commissioned: October 1755 (before launch)
- Fate: Foundered, 29 August 1782, at Spithead
- Notes: Participated in: Battle of Quiberon Bay; Battle of Cape St Vincent

General characteristics
- Class & type: 1745 Establishment 100-gun first-rate ship of the line
- Tons burthen: 2047 bm
- Length: 178 ft (54.3 m) (gundeck); 143 ft 5.5 in (43.7 m) (keel)
- Beam: 51 ft 9.5 in (15.8 m)
- Depth of hold: 21 ft 6 in (6.6 m)
- Propulsion: Sails
- Sail plan: Full-rigged ship
- Armament: 100 guns: Gundeck: 28 × 42 pdrs; Middle gundeck: 28 × 24 pdrs; Upper gundeck: 28 × 12 pdrs; Quarterdeck: 12 × 6 pdrs; Forecastle: 4 × 6 pdrs

HMS Royal George was a 100-gun first-rate ship of the line of the Royal Navy. She was the largest warship in the world at the time of her launch on 18 February 1756. Royal George took ten years to construct at Woolwich Dockyard. The ship saw immediate service during the Seven Years' War, including the Raid on Rochefort in 1757. She was Admiral Sir Edward Hawke's flagship at the Battle of Quiberon Bay in 1759. The ship was laid up following the conclusion of the war in 1763, but was reactivated in 1777 for the American Revolutionary War. She then served as Rear Admiral Robert Digby's flagship at the Battle of Cape St Vincent in 1780.

Royal George sank on 29 August 1782 while anchored at Spithead off Portsmouth. The ship was intentionally rolled (a 'Parliamentary heel') for maintenance on the hull, but she rolled out of control, took on water through her open gun ports, and sank. More than 800 people died, making it one of the most deadly maritime disasters in British territorial waters.

Several attempts were made to raise the vessel, both for salvage and to clear the hazard to navigation in the Solent. In 1782, Charles Spalding recovered fifteen 12-pounder guns using a diving bell of his own design. From 1834 to 1836, Charles and John Deane recovered more guns using a diving helmet they had invented. In 1839 Charles Pasley of the Royal Engineers commenced operations to break up the wreck using barrels of gunpowder. Pasley's team recovered more guns and other items between 1839 and 1842. In 1840, they destroyed the remaining structure of the wreck in an explosion which shattered windows several miles away in Portsmouth and Gosport.

== Service ==
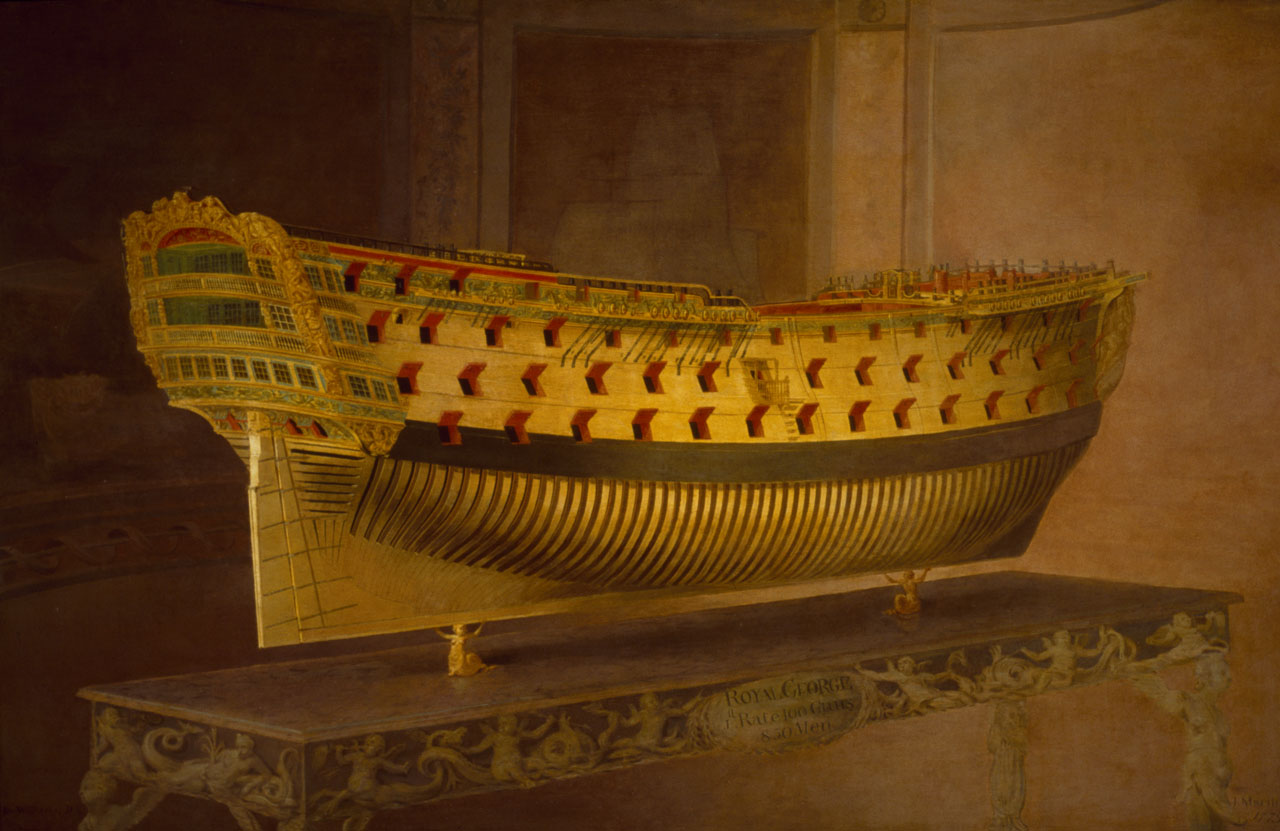
Stern of Royal George: 1779 painting of a model by Joseph Marshall at the National Maritime Museum, Greenwich

Because of problems encountered during the War of the Austrian Succession (1740–1748), the Admiralty attempted to modernise British ship designs with the 1745 Establishment. On 29 August 1746, the Admiralty ordered construction of a 100-gun first rate of the new design, to be named Royal Anne. She was laid down at Woolwich Dockyard in 1746 but was unfinished when the war ended in 1748, causing construction to slow. The ship was renamed Royal George while under construction. She was not completed until 1756, during the Diplomatic Revolution, a few months before the outbreak of the Seven Years' War (1756–1763). The ship was commissioned in October 1755, before she was ready to launch, with her first commander being Captain Richard Dorrill. She was launched on 18 February 1756. The largest warship in the world at the time, she measured more than 2,000 tons burthen and was the "eighteenth-century equivalent of a weapon of mass destruction".

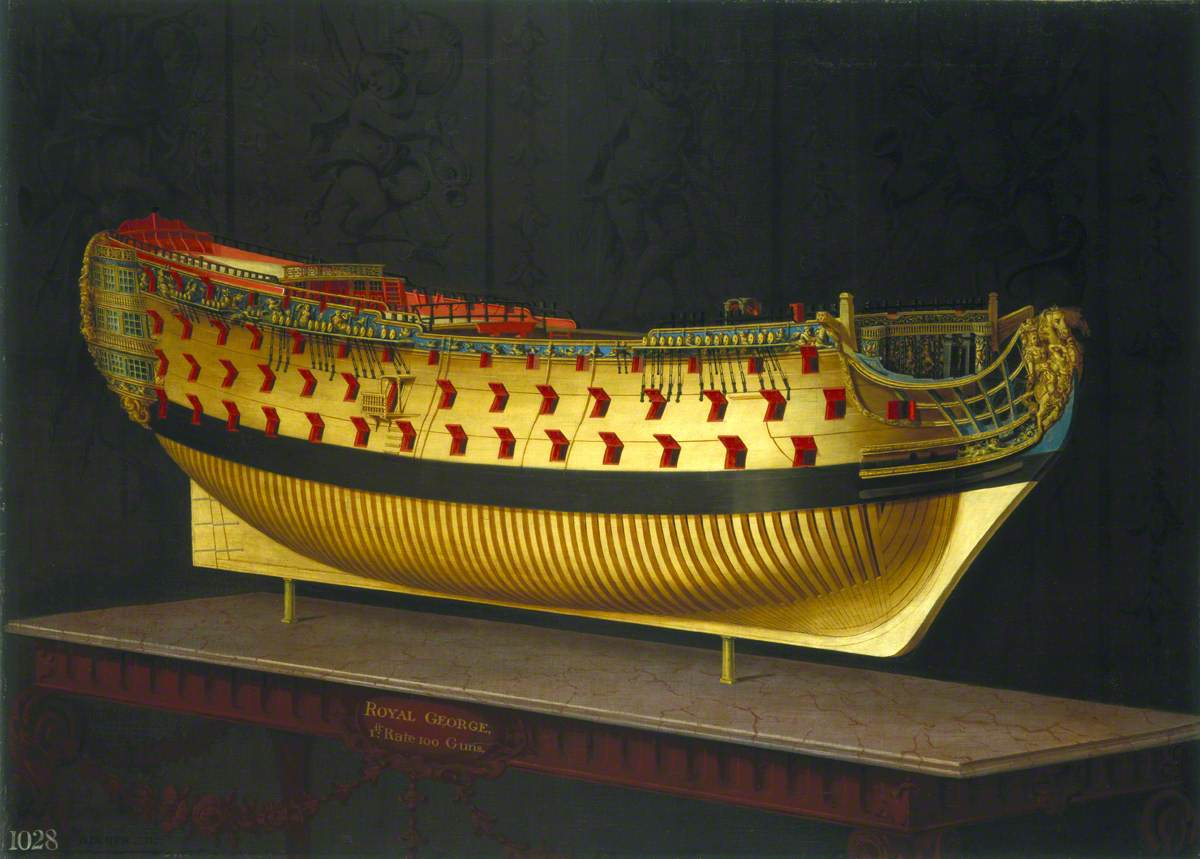
Bow of the Royal George, by Marshall at the Science Museum, London

Royal George joined the Western Squadron (also known as the Channel Fleet) under Admiral Sir Edward Hawke in May 1756, just as the Seven Years' War began. Captain Dorrill was succeeded by Captain John Campbell in July 1756, who was in turn succeeded by Captain Matthew Buckle in early 1757. Royal George was used as the flagship of Vice-Admiral Edward Boscawen in this period, including flying his flag during the Raid on Rochefort in September 1757. Captain Piercy Brett took command in 1758, and Royal George became the flagship of Admiral Lord George Anson in the same year. Brett was succeeded by Captain Alexander Hood in November 1758. The former captain, Richard Dorrill, returned to command the ship the following year, until being invalided in June 1759. Dorrill's replacement was another former captain, John Campbell, who commanded her during the blockade of the French fleet at Brest. She became Sir Edward Hawke's flagship in early November 1759, when his previous flagship, Ramillies, went into dock for repairs. Hawke commanded the fleet from Royal George at the Battle of Quiberon Bay on 20 November 1759, where she sank the French ship Superbe.

Royal George was commanded by Captain William Bennett from March 1760, and she was present at the fleet review at Spithead in July that year. John Campbell returned to command his old ship in August 1760, though Bennett was captain again by December. Royal George joined Admiral Charles Hardy’s fleet in the Autumn of 1762. With peace approaching, and the enormous cost of crewing and provisioning such a large ship, the crew were paid off on 18 December 1762. The ship was laid up in ordinary at the conclusion of the war, along with most other first rates in the fleet. Whilst laid up, Royal George underwent a major repair at Plymouth between 1765 and 1768.

The ship was reactivated after the outbreak of the American War of Independence (1775–1783), being re-fitted for service at Portsmouth between May 1778 and April 1779. She re-commissioned under Captain Thomas Hallum in July 1778, with command passing to Captain John Colpoys in November that year. Royal George was again assigned to the Channel Fleet, where she was flagship of Vice-Admiral Sir Robert Harland. Vice-Admiral George Darby briefly replaced Harland in June 1779, then from August 1779 to December 1781 she was the flagship of Rear-Admiral Sir John Lockhart Ross. Meanwhile, Captain Colpoys was replaced by Captain John Bourmaster in December 1779, and she joined Admiral Sir George Rodney's fleet in their mission to relieve Gibraltar. Under Bourmaster, and flying Ross's flag, Royal George took part in the attack on the Caracas convoy on 8 January 1780, the Battle of Cape St. Vincent on 16 January, and took part in the successful relief of Gibraltar three days later.

Royal George returned to Britain with the rest of the fleet, and had her hull coppered in April 1780. She returned to service that summer, serving with the Channel Fleet under Admiral Francis Geary, and then George Darby again from the autumn. Both captain and admiral changed again in late 1781, Bourmaster being replaced by Captain Henry Cromwell, and Ross by Rear-Admiral Richard Kempenfelt. She served as part of Samuel Barrington's squadron from April 1782, with Cromwell replaced by Captain Martin Waghorn in May. Royal George then joined the fleet under Richard Howe.

== Loss ==
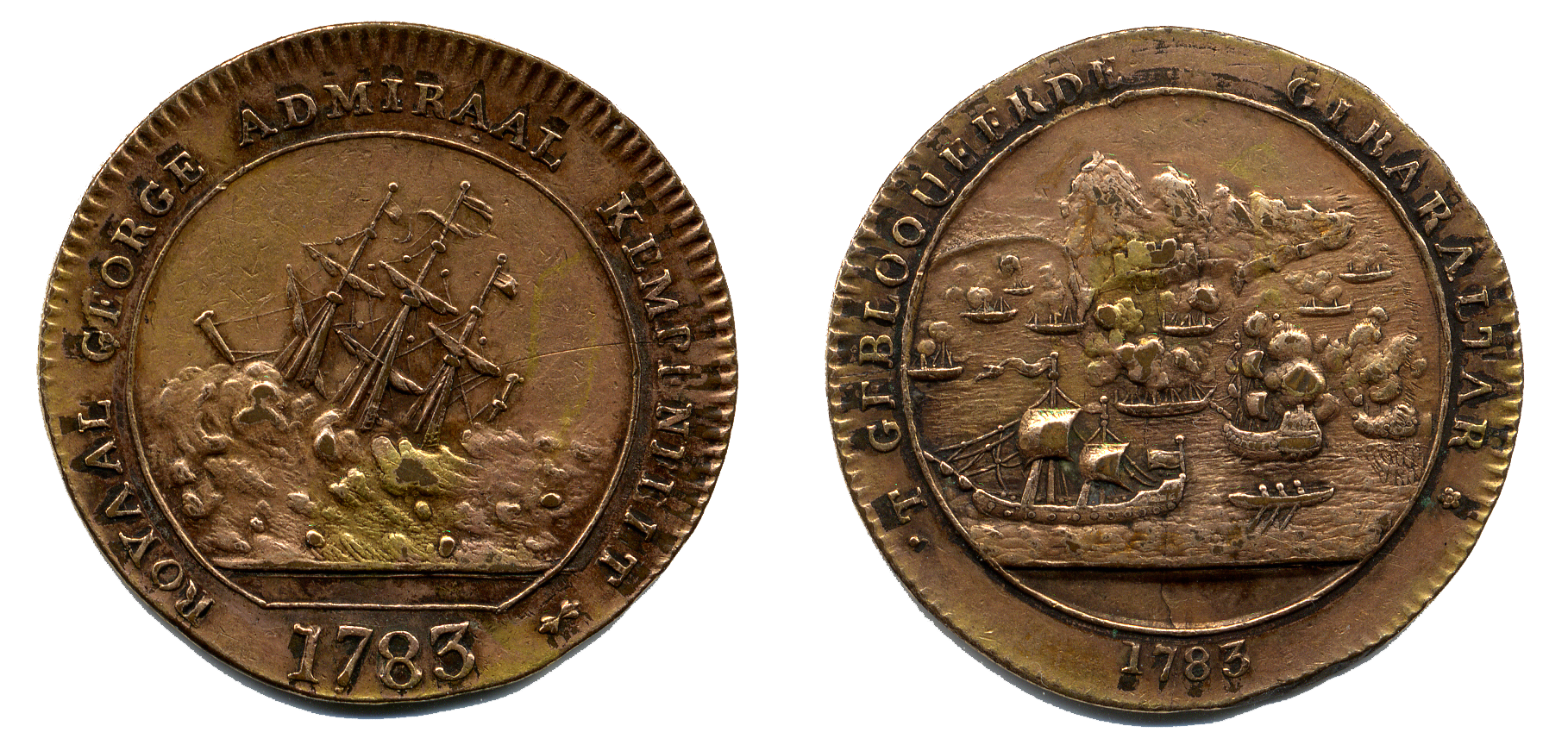
1783 medallion commemorating the sinking of Royal George

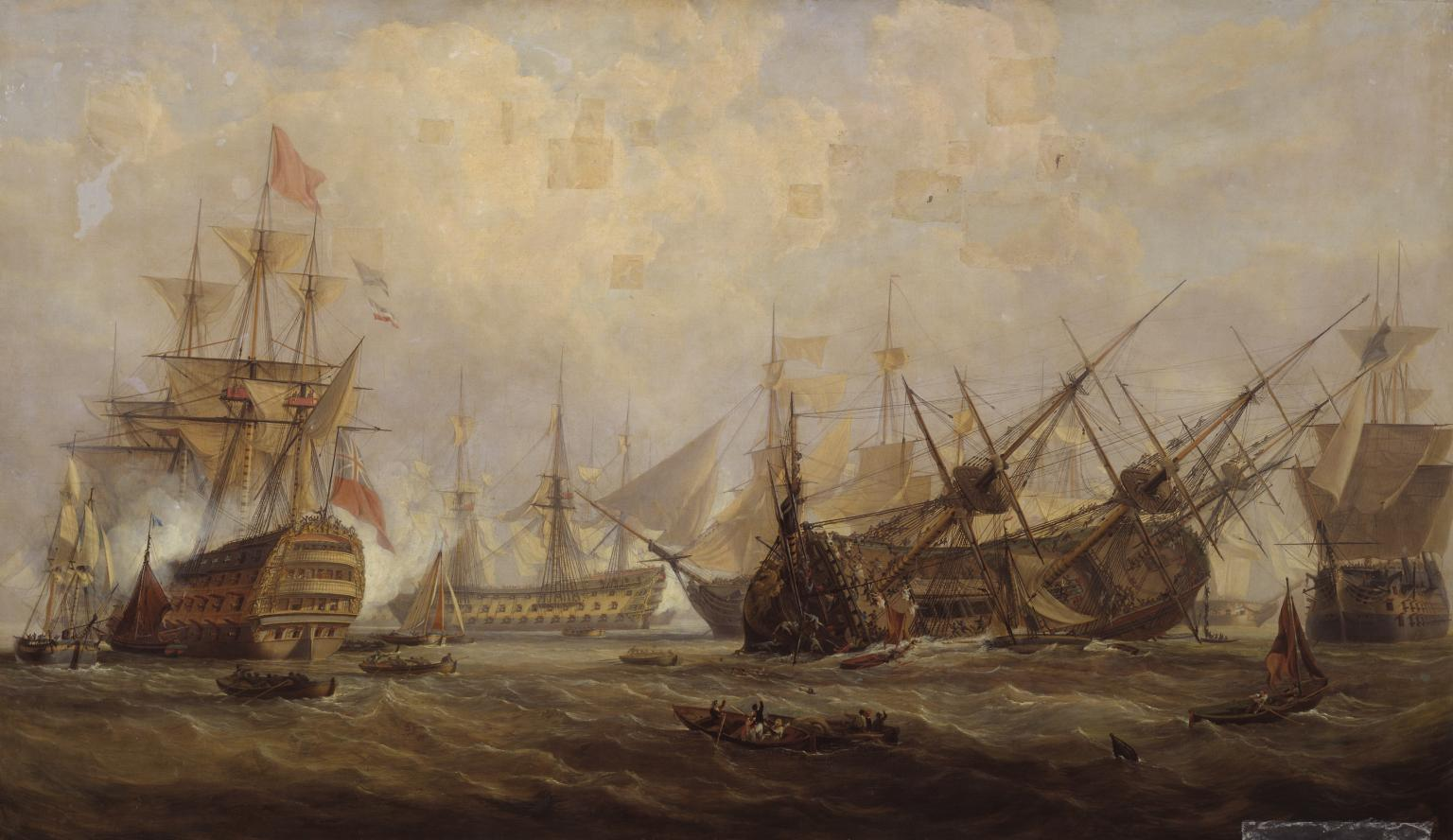
Loss of the Royal George (John Christian Schetky, 1840)

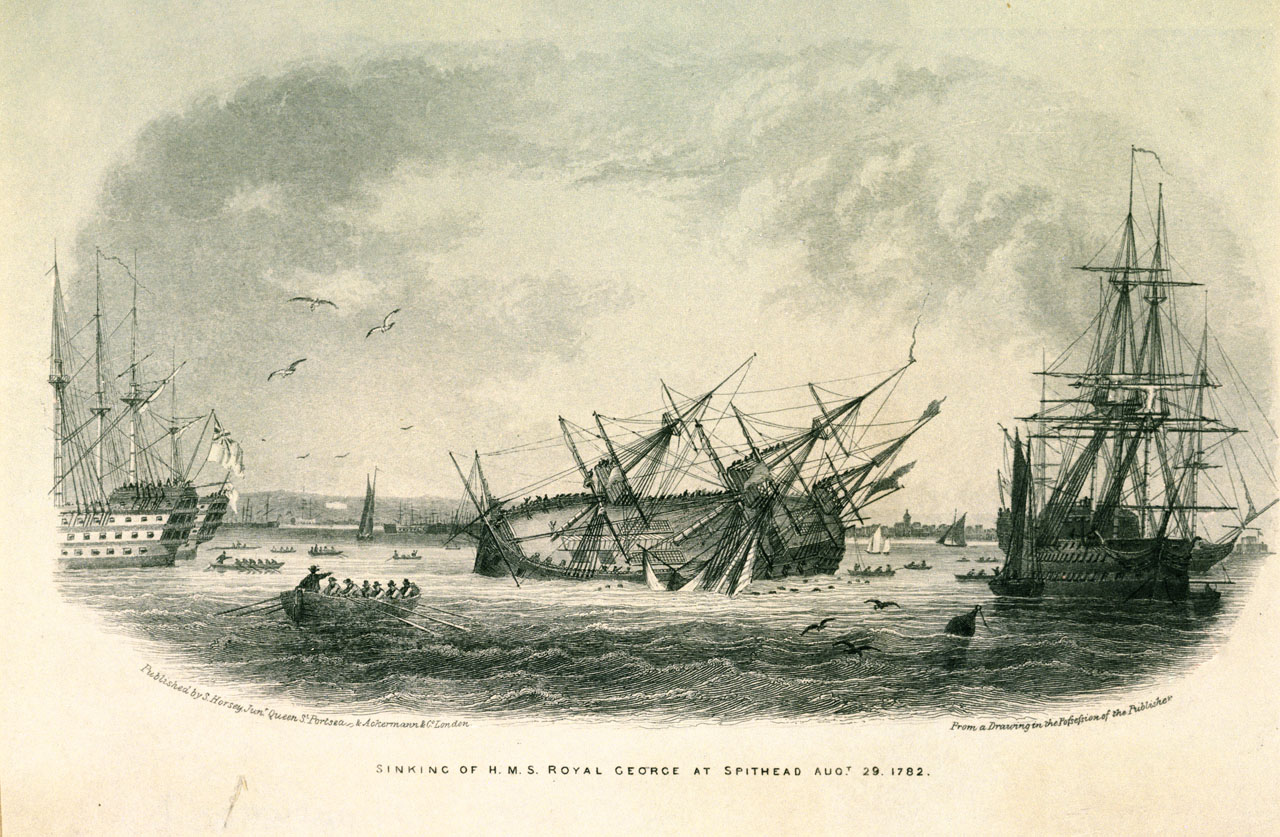
Sinking of Royal George

On 28 August 1782 Royal George was preparing to sail with Admiral Howe's fleet on another relief of Gibraltar. The ships were anchored at Spithead to take on supplies. Most of her complement were aboard, with a large number of workmen for the repairs. There were also 200–300 relatives visiting the officers and men, 100–200 "ladies from the Point [at Portsmouth], who, though seeking neither husbands or fathers, yet visit our newly arrived ships of war", and a number of merchants and traders selling their wares to the seamen. All shore leave had been cancelled, with every sailor kept aboard for fear of desertion, except for a detachment of sixty marines sent ashore that morning. The exact number of crew on board is unknown, but is estimated at 1,200.^{[a]}

At seven o'clock on the morning of 29 August, work on the hull was carried out and Royal George was heeled over by rolling the ship's starboard guns into the centreline of the ship. This caused the ship to tilt over to port. Further, the loading of a large number of casks of rum on the now-low port side created additional and, it turned out, unstable weight. The ship heeled over too far, passing her centre of gravity. Realising that the ship was settling in the water, the ship's carpenter informed the lieutenant of the watch, Monin Hollingbery, and asked him to beat the drum to signal to the men to right the ship. The officer refused. As the situation worsened, the carpenter implored the officer a second time, and was again refused. The carpenter then took his concern directly to the ship's captain, who agreed and gave the order to move the guns back into position.

By this time, however, the ship had already taken on too much water through its port-side gun ports, and the drum was never sounded. The ship tilted heavily to port, causing a sudden inrush of water and a burst of air out the starboard side. The barge along the port side which had been unloading the rum was caught in the masts as the ship turned, briefly delaying the sinking, but losing most of her crew. Royal George quickly filled with water and sank, taking with her around 900 people, including up to 300 women and 60 children visitors. However, 255 people were saved, including eleven women and one child. Some escaped by running up the rigging, while others were picked up by boats from other vessels. Admiral Kempenfelt was writing in his cabin when the ship sank; the cabin doors had jammed because of the ship's heeling and he perished. Captain Waghorn was injured and thrown into the water, but rescued. The carpenter survived the sinking, but died less than a day later, never having regained consciousness. Lieutenant Hollingbery also survived.

Many of the victims were washed ashore at Ryde, Isle of Wight, where they were buried in a mass grave that stretched along the beach, on land now occupied by Ryde Esplanade and The Strand. A plaque in memory of Royal George was unveiled in 1965 by Earl Mountbatten, and moved in 2006 to the Royal George Memorial Garden on the Ryde Esplanade. In April 2009, Isle of Wight Council placed a new memorial plaque in the restored Ashley Gardens also on the Esplanade.

A court-martial acquitted the officers and crew (many of whom had perished), blaming the accident on the "general state of decay of her timbers" and suggesting that the frame of the ship gave way under the stress of the heel. Naval historian Nicholas Tracy, along with most historians, holds Hollingberry largely responsible for the sinking, concluding that an "alert officer of the watch would have prevented the tragedy ...". Hollingberry allowed water to accumulate on the gundeck, and the resulting free surface effect eventually compromised the ship's stability.

A fund was established by Lloyd's Coffee House to help the widows and children of the sailors lost in the sinking, which became the start of the Lloyd's Patriotic Fund. The accident was commemorated in verse by the poet William Cowper:

Toll for the brave
The Brave that are no more,
All sunk beneath the wave,
Fast by their native shore.

— "The Loss of the Royal George", William Cowper, 1782

== Salvage attempts ==
=== Initial attempts ===
Several attempts were made to raise the vessel, both for salvage and because she was a major hazard to navigation, lying in a busy harbour at a depth of only 65 ft (20 m). In 1782, Charles Spalding recovered six iron 12-pounder guns and nine brass 12-pounders using a diving bell of his design.

=== Deane brothers (1834) ===
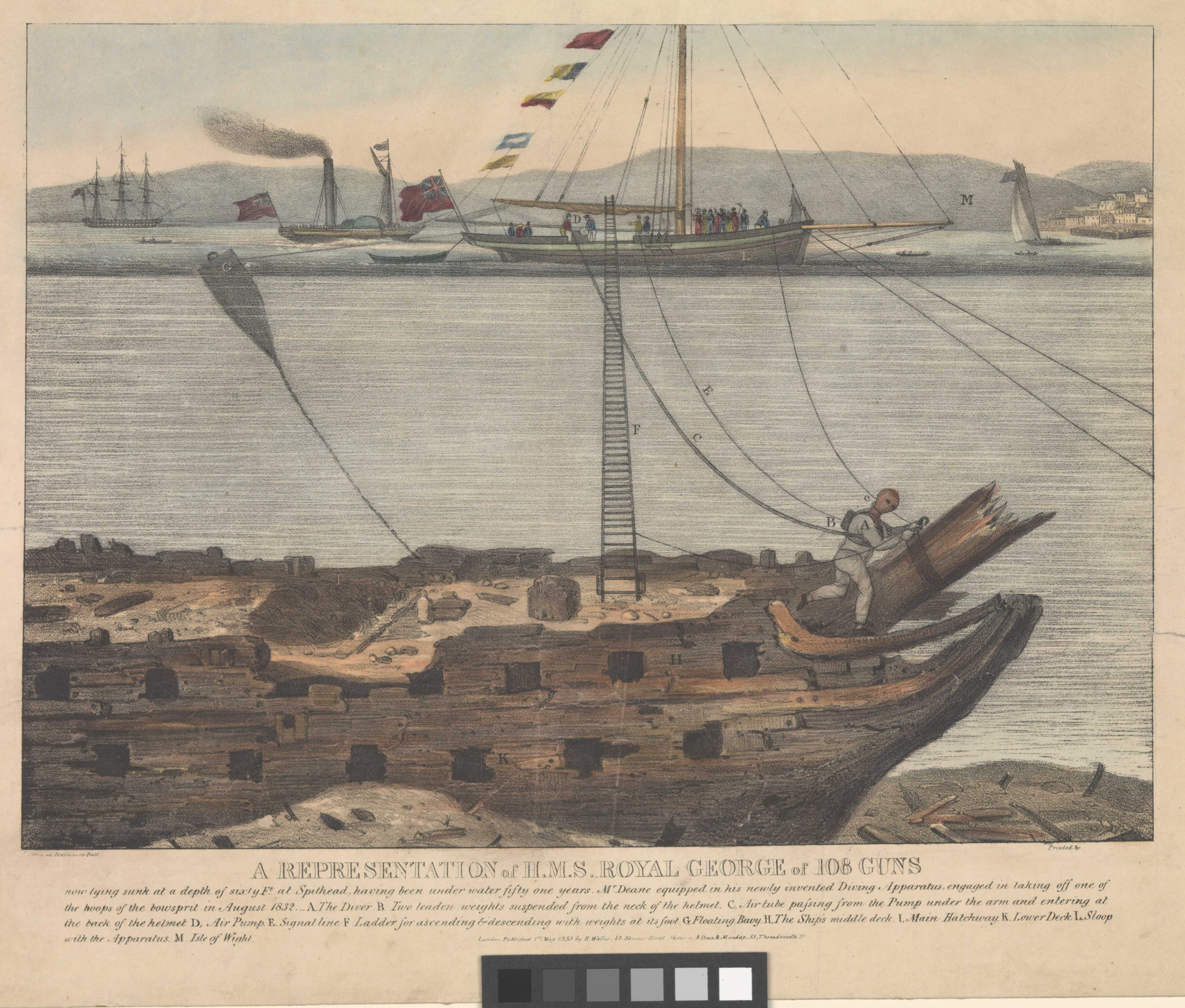
Charles Anthony Deane exploring Royal George's wreck in 1832

No further work was carried out on the wreck until 1834, when Charles Anthony Deane and his brother John, using the first air-pumped diving helmet which they had invented, began work. From 1834 to 1836 they recovered 7 iron 42-pounders, 18 brass 24-pounders and 3 brass 12-pounders for which he received salvage from the Board of Ordnance. The remaining guns were buried under mud and the timbers of the wreck and were irrecoverable. It was during this operation that local fishermen asked the divers to investigate something on the seabed that their nets kept snagging. A dive by John Deane 1 kilometre (0.62 mi) north east of Royal George revealed timbers and guns from Mary Rose, the first time that its resting place had been located in centuries.

=== Pasley (1839) ===
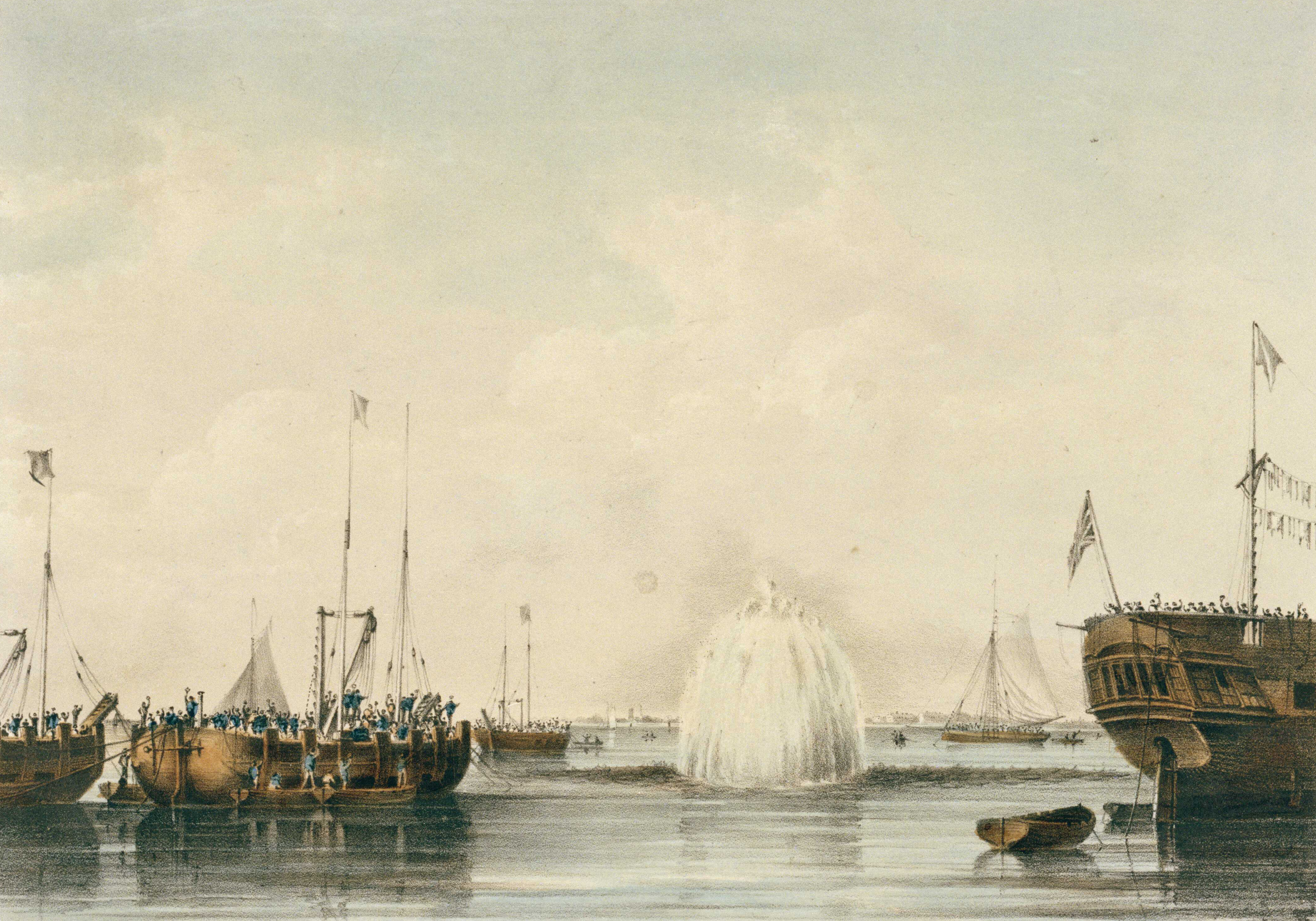
The explosion of a large cylinder of gunpowder against Royal George's wreck on 23 September 1839

In 1839 Major-General Charles Pasley, at the time a colonel of the Royal Engineers, commenced operations. Pasley had previously destroyed some old wrecks in the Thames to clear a channel using gunpowder charges; his plan was to break up the wreck of Royal George in a similar way and then salvage as much as possible using divers. The charges used were made from oak barrels filled with gunpowder and covered with lead. They were initially detonated using chemical fuses, but this was later changed to an electrical system using a resistance-heated platinum wire to detonate the gunpowder.

Pasley's operation set many diving milestones, including the first recorded use of the buddy system in diving, when he ordered that his divers operate in pairs. In addition, a Corporal Jones made the first emergency swimming ascent after his air line became tangled and he had to cut it free. An unfortunate milestone was the first medical account of a diver squeeze suffered by a Private Williams: the early diving helmets used had no non-return valves; this meant that if a hose became severed, the high-pressure air around the diver's head rapidly evacuated the helmet, causing tremendous negative pressure with extreme and sometimes life-threatening effects. At the British Association for the Advancement of Science meeting in 1842, Sir John Richardson described the diving apparatus and treatment of diver Roderick Cameron following an injury that occurred on 14 October 1841 during the salvage operations.

In 1840, the use of controlled explosions to destroy the wreck continued through to September. on an occasion that year the Royal Engineers set off a huge controlled explosion which shattered windows as far away as Portsmouth and Gosport.

Meanwhile, Pasley had recovered 12 more guns in 1839, 11 more in 1840, and 6 in 1841. In 1842 he recovered only one iron 12-pounder, because he ordered the divers to concentrate on removing the hull timbers rather than search for guns. Other items recovered, in 1840, included the surgeon's brass instruments, silk garments of satin weave "of which the silk was perfect", and pieces of leather; but no woollen clothing. By 1843 the whole of the keel and the bottom timbers had been raised and the site was declared clear.

== Surviving timbers and guns ==
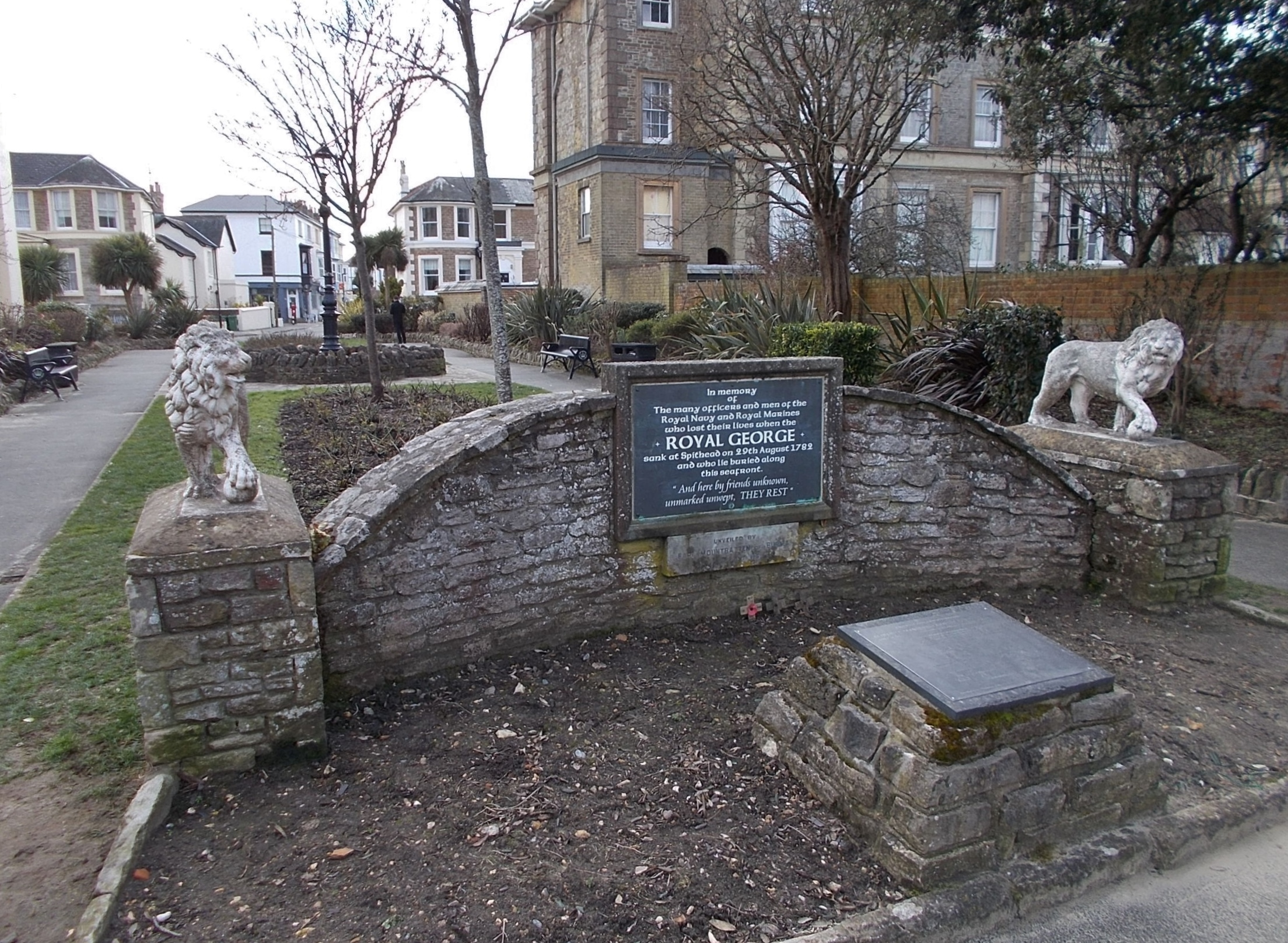
Memorial at Ryde, Isle of Wight commemorating the loss

A 24-pounder from the ship is part of the Royal Armouries collection and on display at Southsea Castle. Several of the salvaged bronze cannon were melted down to form part of Nelson's Column in London's Trafalgar Square. The Corinthian capital is made of bronze elements, cast at the Woolwich Arsenal foundry. The bronze pieces, some weighing as much as 900 pounds (410 kg) are fixed to the column by the means of three large belts of metal lying in grooves in the stone.

Recovered materials were used to make a variety of souvenirs. In the 1850s, timber from the ship was used to make the billiard table by J. Thurston & Co. for the North Wing of Burghley House. Wood salvaged from the Royal George was also used to make the coffin for the famous menagerie owner George Wombwell who died in 1850 and the covers of A Narrative of the loss of the Royal George, at Spithead, August, 1782; including Tracey's Attempt to raise her in 1783, also Col Pasley's Operations in Removing the Wreck, by Explosions of Gunpowder, in 1839–40 by Colonel Pasley. The Royal Engineers Museum in Gillingham, Kent, also holds in its collection mast fragments, rigging, ceramics and weaponry fragments.

== Notes ==
a. Royal George's usual complement was 867.
