= Ashlyns School =

Foundation school in England

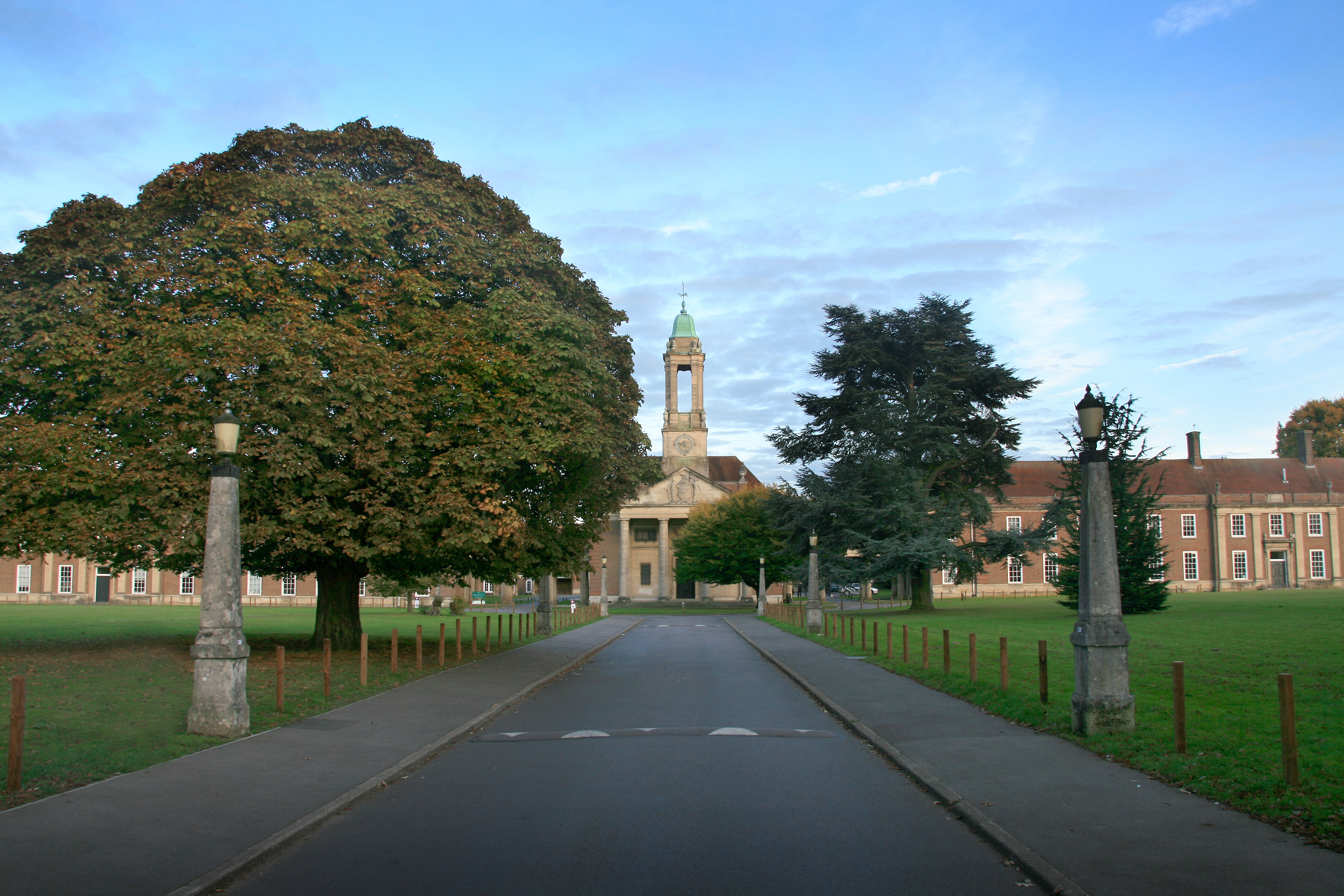
- The school driveway

Location
- Chesham Road; Berkhamsted, Hertfordshire, HP4 3AH; England; 51°45′12″N 0°33′51″W

Information
- Type: Foundation school
- Motto: Aspire and Achieve
- Established: 1935
- Founder: Thomas Coram Foundation for Children
- Local authority: Hertfordshire
- Department for Education URN: 117578 Tables
- Ofsted: Reports
- Headteacher: James Shapland
- Gender: Mixed
- Age: 11 to 18
- Enrolment: 1,152 as of April 2016
- Houses: Bourne, Coram, Handel and Raven
- Colours: Blue, green, red and yellow
- Website: http://www.ashlyns.herts.sch.uk/

Ashlyns School is a mixed secondary school and sixth form located in Berkhamsted, Hertfordshire, England. The school was established in 1935 as the final location of the Foundling Hospital, a children's charity founded in London in 1739. The Berkhamsted building converted into a school in 1955. Ashlyns School is noted as an example of neo-Georgian architecture and is a Grade II listed building.

== History ==
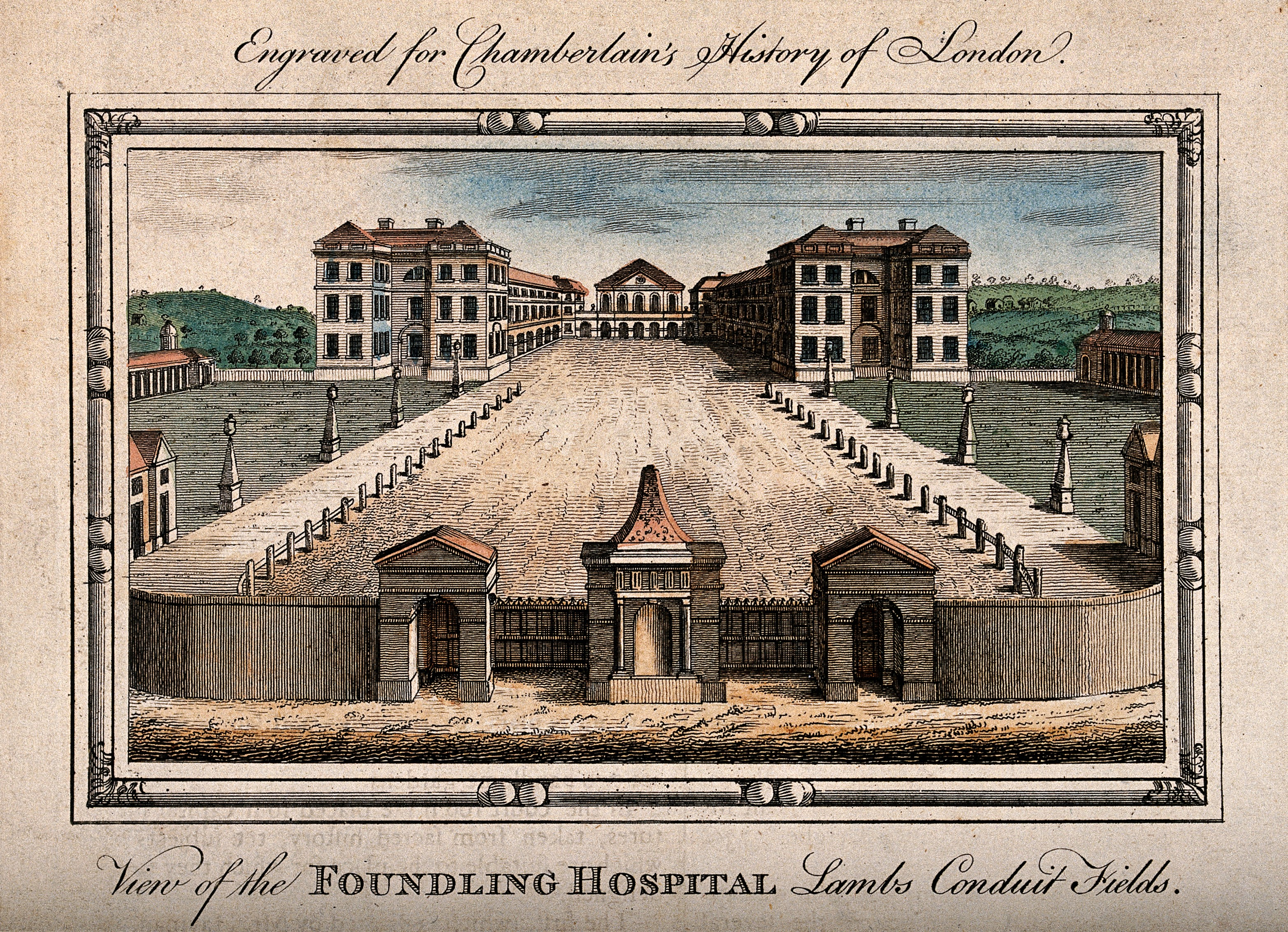
The original Foundling Hospital, London, in 1770

The Foundling Hospital was a charitable institution founded in 1739 by the philanthropic sea captain Thomas Coram to house and educate abandoned and orphaned children. It was established under royal charter by King George II and was supported by many noted figures of the day in high society and the arts. Artists such as William Hogarth, Joshua Reynolds, Allan Ramsay and Thomas Gainsborough all exhibited paintings at the Hospital, and the composer George Frederic Handel held benefit concerts in the Hospital chapel to raise funds, performing his specially composed Foundling Hospital Anthem and his oratorio Messiah.

The Foundling Hospital was located in Lamb's Conduit Fields in Bloomsbury, an undeveloped, pastoral area of London. As the city expanded and became more polluted in the 19th century, the Hospital governors began to consider relocation to a healthier, more rural location. With the advent of the railways, travel outside the city was much easier. In 1926, the Foundling Hospital relocated temporarily to Redhill, Surrey, while a new, purpose-built school was constructed in Berkhamsted on land obtained from the Ashlyns Estate. The new building, designed by John Mortimer Sheppard in a neo-Georgian style and modelled on the original Foundling Hospital, opened in 1935.

Following the reorganisation of schools under the Education Act 1944, the Foundling Hospital began to provide education under the name of Thomas Coram Schools, supported by a grant from Hertfordshire County Council. After the Children Act 1948 placed an obligation on local authorities to provide child welfare services, the emphasis in child care in Britain began to shift from residential institutions to foster care, with children living in local homes and attending local schools. In 1951 the Berkhamsted building became a secondary modern school, under the name Ashlyns School. For a time some children under the care of the charity continued to live in the school, but once they moved out after 1954, their dormitories on the first floor became class rooms. In 1955, after protracted negotiations, the Ashlyns School and the Foundling Hospital estate (including staff houses in Coram Close) were sold to Hertfordshire County Council for the sum of £225,000. In the 1960s, Ashlyns became a comprehensive school.

While Ashlyns School no longer fulfils a charitable function, the work of the Foundling Hospital is continued today by the Thomas Coram Foundation for Children (now known simply as Coram), a registered charity.

The school has been awarded specialist school status as a Language College. Since 2009, the headteacher has been James Shapland, formerly deputy headteacher of Nicholas Breakspear School in St Albans.

== Filming location ==
The school has been used for the setting of the film Son of Rambow which was primarily shot in the surrounding area of Berkhamsted and Ashridge Estate. Location filming has also taken place at Ashlyns for the BBC television drama Call the Midwife and the soap opera EastEnders. Filming has taken place at Ashlyns for the Netflix series The Crown. In 2013, the Australian rock project Tame Impala shot the music video for their single "Mind Mischief", from their album Lonerism, on the school premises. In 2022, Ashlyns was used significantly for the filming of The Boys in the Boat.

== Architecture ==
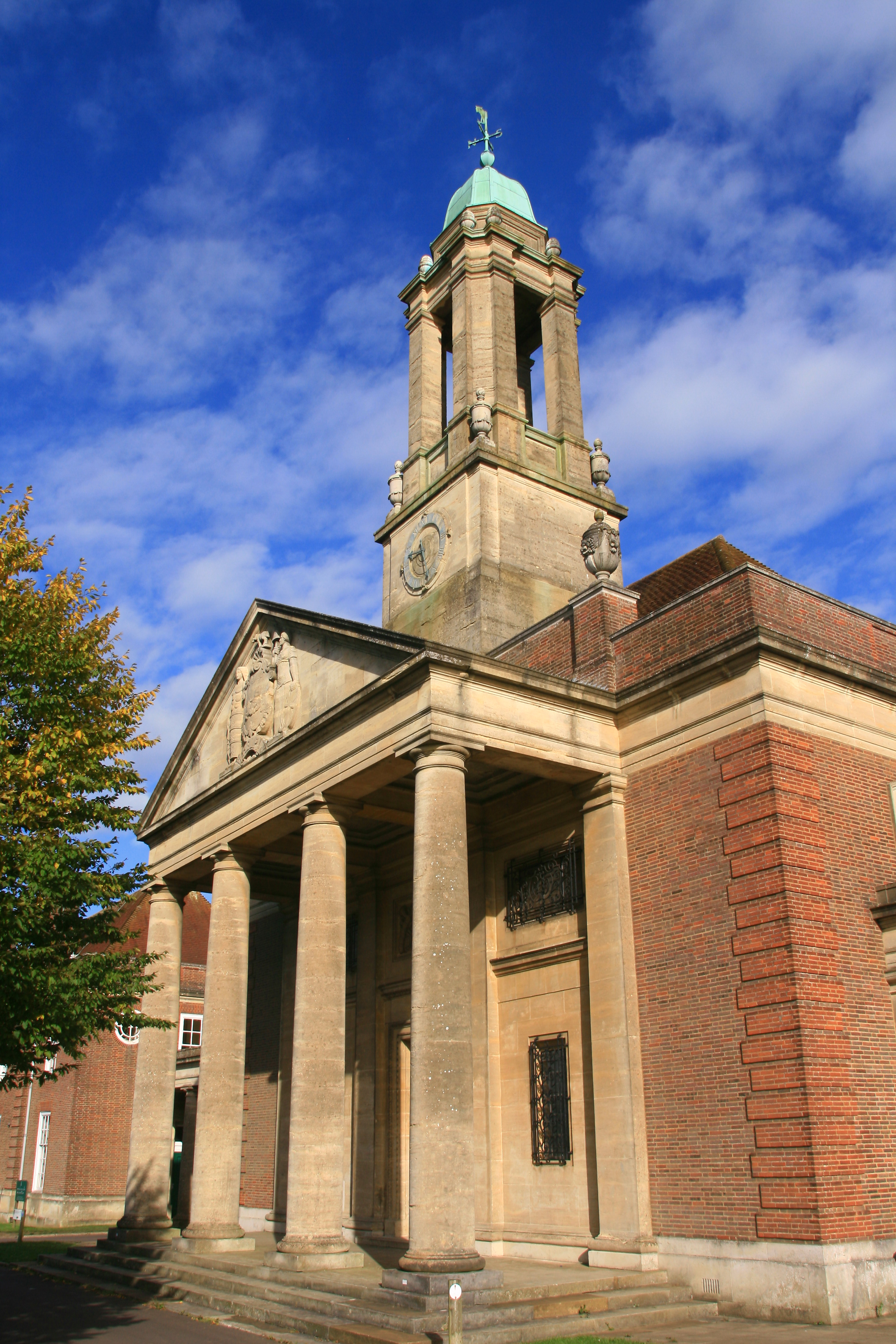
The Neoclassical portico and clock tower of Ashlyns School chapel

The school was constructed for the Foundling Hospital 1932–35 by the architect John Mortimer Sheppard. Set in extensive grounds, it is designed in a Neo-Georgian (Neoclassical) style, laid out as a symmetrical group of school buildings linked by colonnades of stone columns and organised around a courtyard. At the centre of the site, facing the entrance avenue, is the school chapel, topped with a tall cupola. The chapel is fronted by a large stone portico; four Doric columns support a large pediment which is emblazoned with the school coat of arms, consisting of an escutcheon depicting a baby and the moon and stars, and topped by crest of a lamb. It is flanked by a pair female supporters, the allegorical figures of Britannia and the eight-breasted Artemis of Ephesus. The motto is "Help". This heraldic device is similar to the arms of the original Foundling Hospital designed by William Hogarth.

When it was opened, the chapel at Berkhamsted was fitted out with a number of fixtures and artefacts which had been transferred from the original Foundling Hospital Chapel in London, including a bust of the composer George Frederick Handel; the original 18th-century wooden pews, including the "Governors' pews"; several stained glass windows; the ornate iron communion rail; a baptismal font dating from 1804; a mid-nineteenth-century pulpit; and a number of 18th and 19th-century memorials, many of which made reference to burials in St George's, Bloomsbury, the parish church that stood next to the old Foundling Hospital. The chapel organ, which had been personally donated to the Foundling Hospital by George Frederick Handel in the 1750s, was also installed in the Berkhamsted chapel. It is thought that the organ casing was designed by the original Hospital architect, Theodore Jacobsen. The bodily remains of the founder, Thomas Coram, were placed in a tomb in a memorial crypt. Nikolaus Pevsner also mentions the statue of Thomas Coram by the sculptor William Calder Marshall, which had once stood at the entrance gates of the Bloomsbury Hospital grounds.

Prior to the sale of the school to Hertfordshire County Council in 1955, there was some debate about the original Foundling Hospital fixtures that had been brought to Berkhamsted. While some items were left in place in Ashlyns, many other items were removed. The remains of Thomas Coram were exhumed and moved to the Church of St Andrew, Holborn in London. The chapel organ was also dismantled and re-installed in St Andrew's Holborn along with the font and pulpit.

Since 2003, Ashlyns School building and its chapel have been a Grade II listed building.

=== Chapel fittings ===
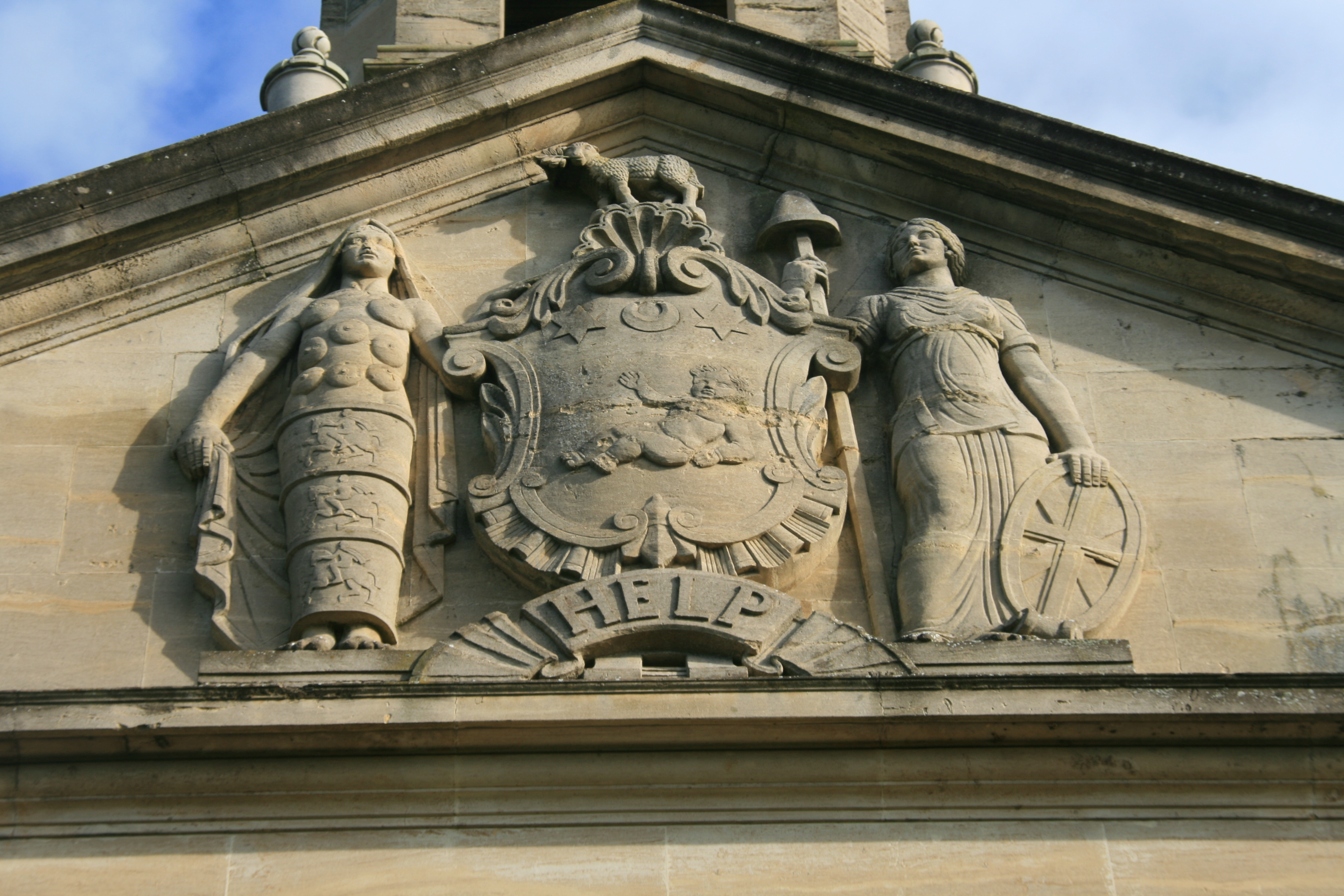
The Foundling Hospital coat of arms

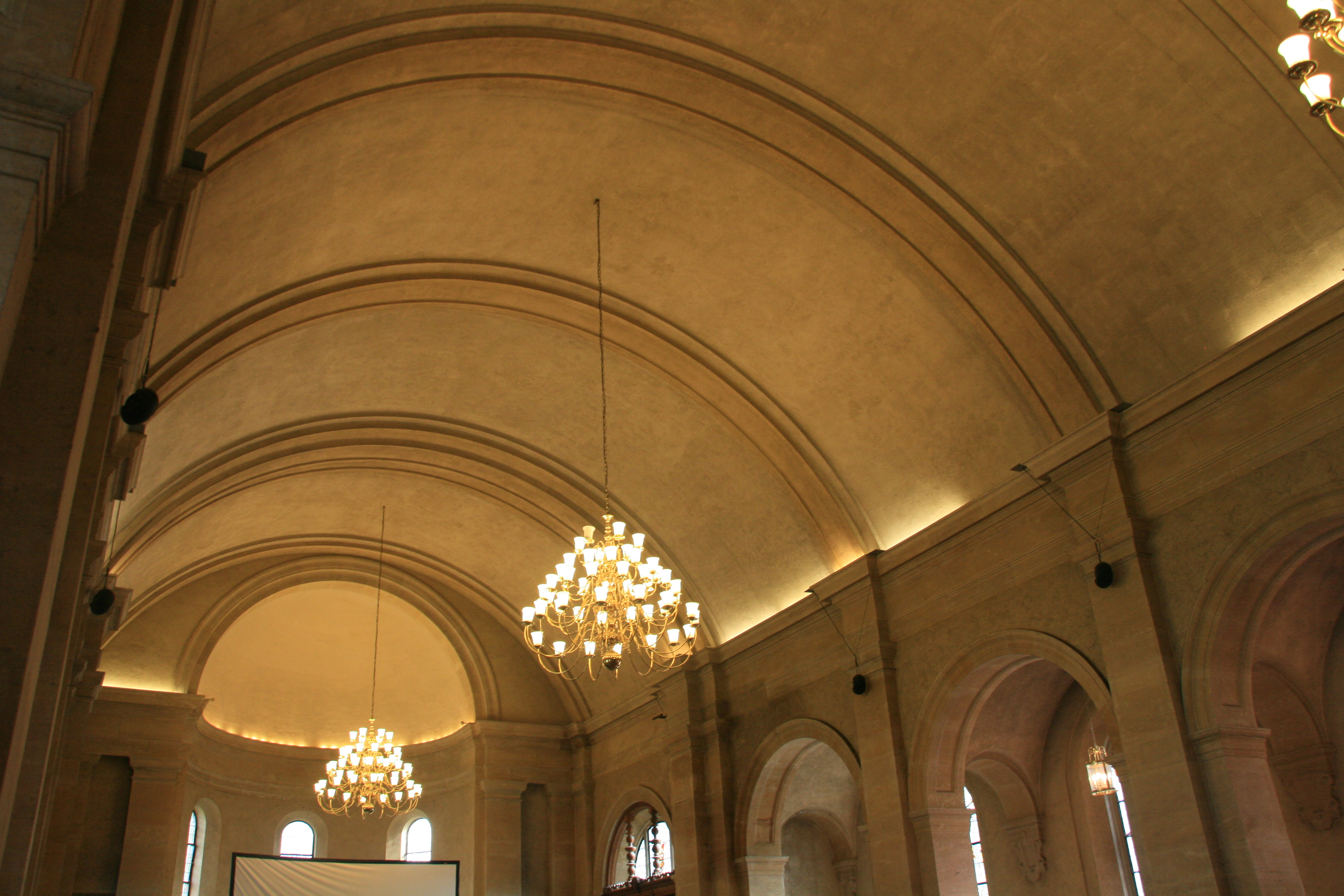
The school chapel nave

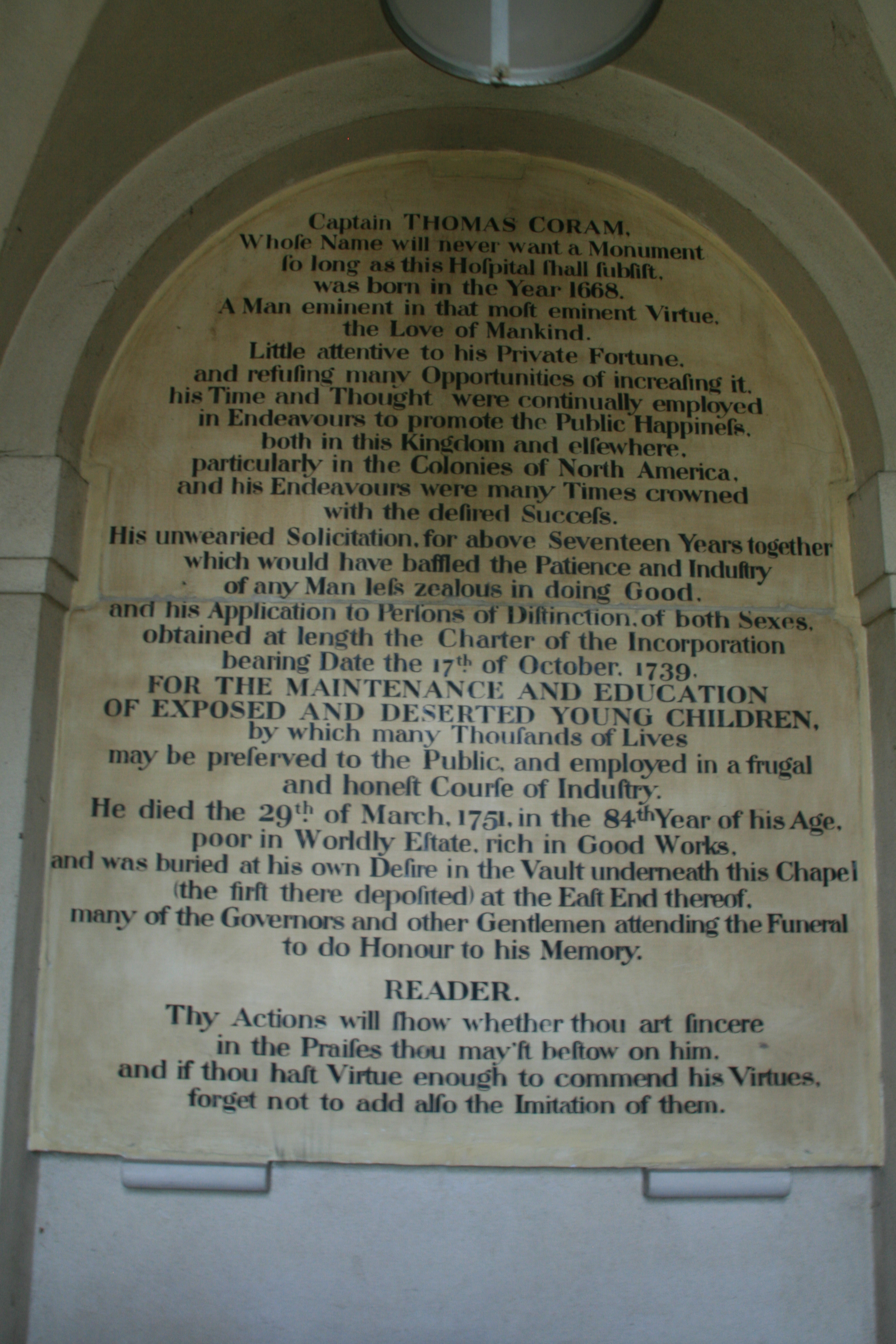
Thomas Coram memorial

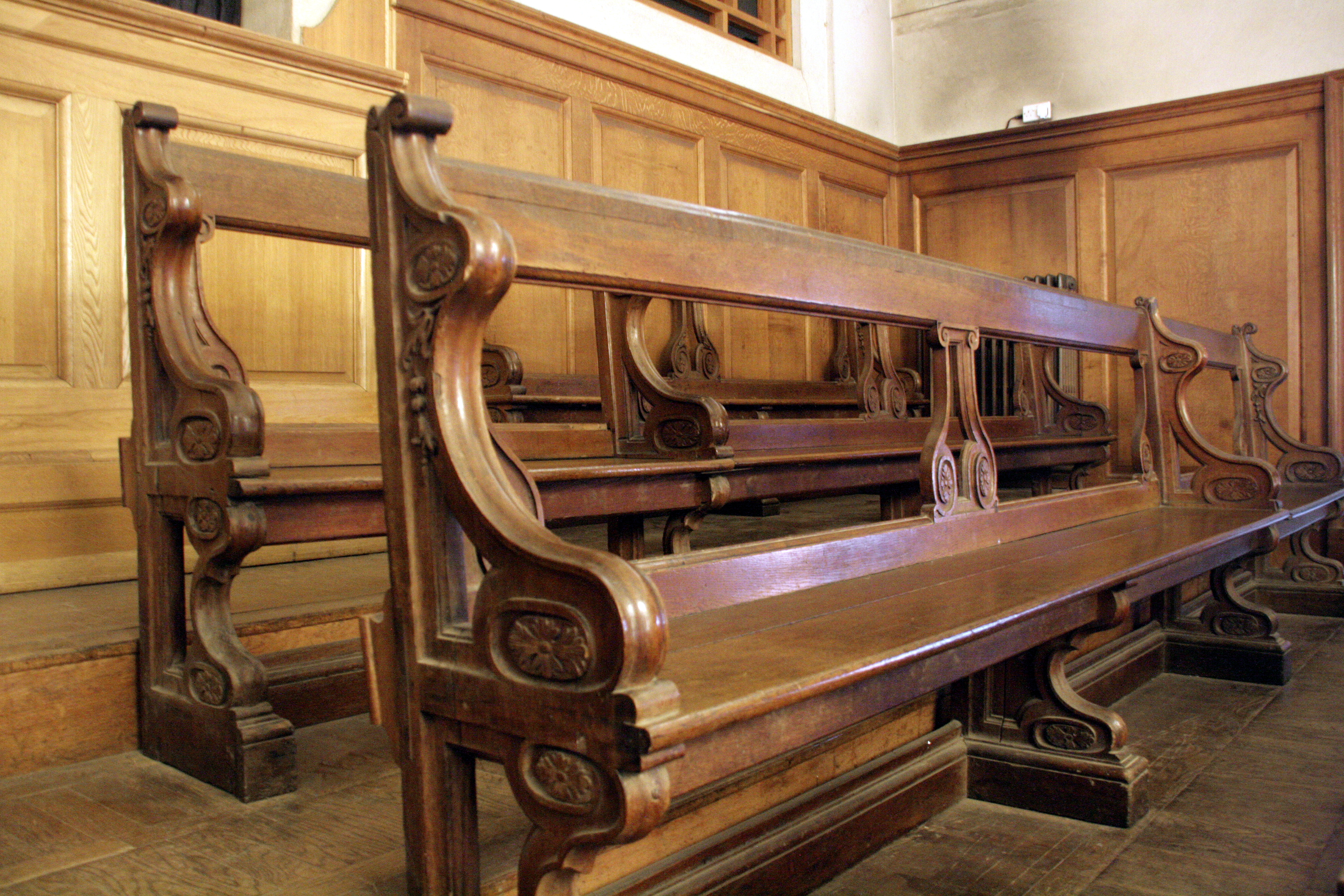
Original Foundling Hospital chapel benches

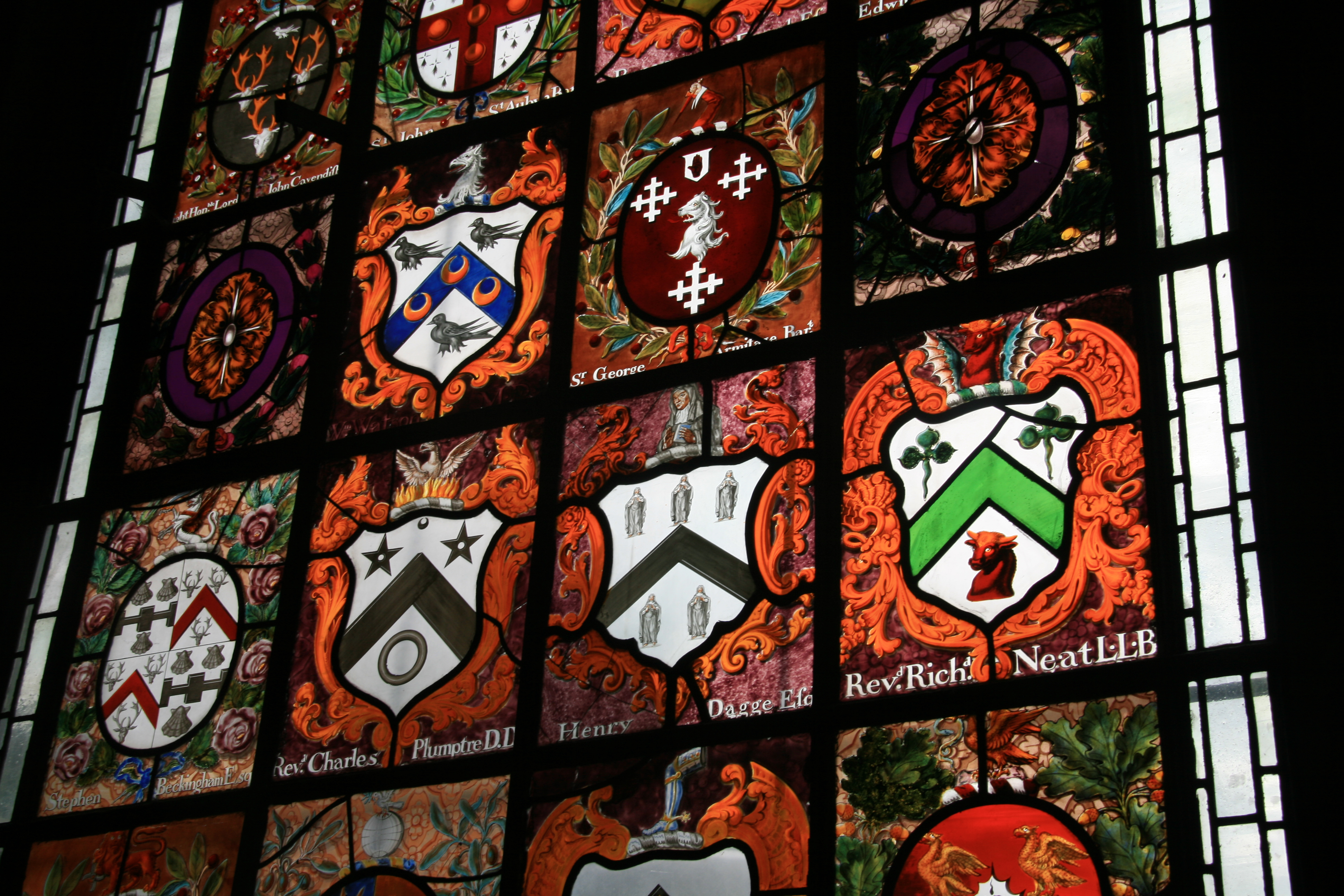
Stained glass in the chapel

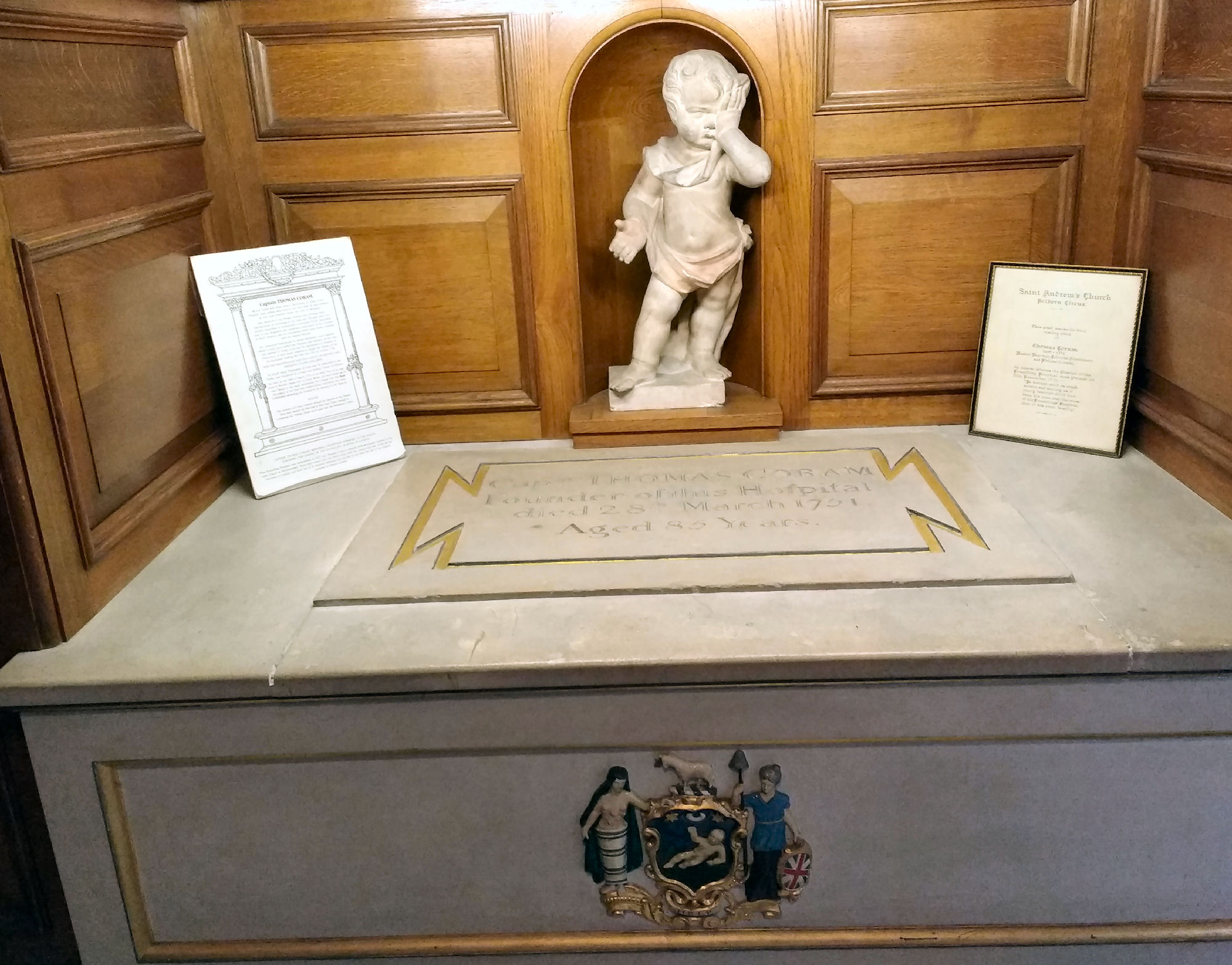
Thomas Coram's tomb (removed 1955)

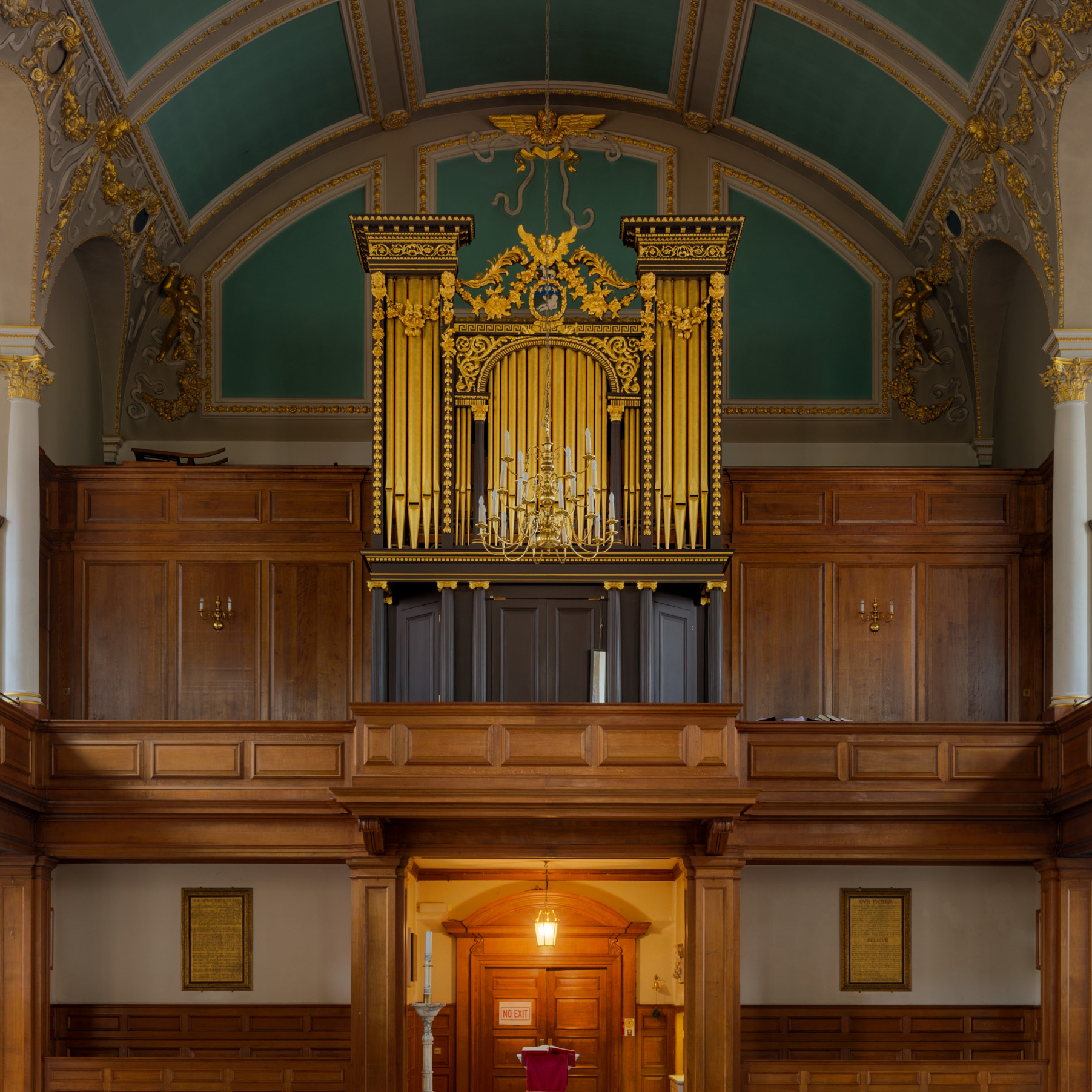
The Foundling Hospital organ (removed 1955)

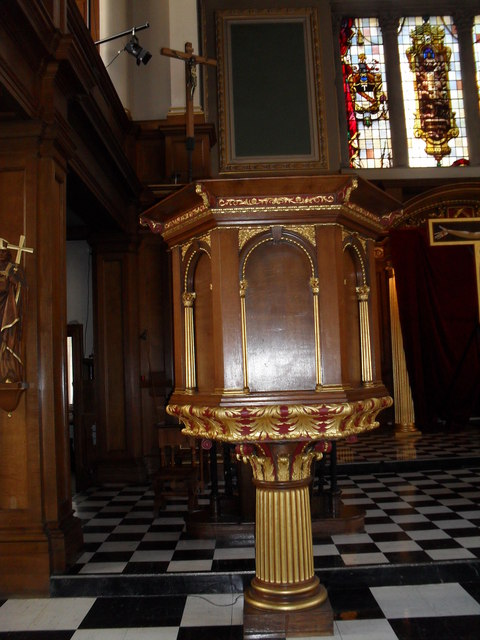
The Foundling Hospital Chapel pulpit (removed 1955)

== Notable teachers and alumni ==
- John Babington, former headmaster
- Derek Beaven, novelist
- Candice Brown, winner of the Great British Bake Off, PE teacher at the school during filming
- Derek Fowlds, actor
- Ben Champniss - EastEnders Actor (Shrimpy)
