= Derek Beaven =

British novelist

Derek Beaven (born 1947) is a British novelist. His first novel, Newton's Niece, won the Commonwealth Writers Prize for best first book, Europe and South Asia. His second book, Acts of Mutiny was shortlisted for the Guardian Fiction Prize and the Encore Award.

Beaven was born in South London. He studied at Ashlyns School, Hertfordshire. He read English at Oxford University. He lives in Maidenhead, Berkshire, England.

== Works ==
- Newton′s Niece, Faber and Faber, 1994, ISBN 978-0-571-17136-1
- Acts of Mutiny, Fourth Estate, 1998, ISBN 978-1-85702-641-2
- If the Invader Comes, Fourth Estate, 2001, ISBN 978-1-84115-591-3
- His Coldest Winter, Fourth Estate, 2005; HarperCollins, 2006, ISBN 978-0-00-715110-3
- The Icon Painter, CreateSpace Independent Publishing Platform, 2014, ISBN 1-508-57558-4
- Pharmakon, CreateSpace Independent Publishing Platform, 2015, ISBN 1-508-84338-4
- Remake, Derek Beaven, 2024, ISBN 1-068-78191-2

== Reviews ==
- Julie Myerson (8 September 2001). "Emotional invasions". The Guardian.
- DJ Taylor (27 September 2001). "If the Invader Comes by Derek Beaven". The Independent.
- Hugo Barnacle (27 March 2005). "Fiction: His Coldest Winter by Derek Beaven". The Sunday Times.
- Alfred Hickling (19 March 2005). "Cold war, lukewarm plot". The Guardian.
- "Acts of Muniny", The New York Times, Mark Schone, 19 March 2000
