= Bernard de Neumann =

British mathematician (1943–2018)

Frederick Bernard de Neumann (known in Austria and Germany as Bernhard von Neumann; (15 December 1943 – 18 April 2018) was a British mathematician, computer scientist, inventor, and naval historian.

He was educated at the Royal Hospital School and Birmingham University, and was Professor of Mathematics at The City University.

He was a descendant of Johann Andreas von Neumann, nobleman of the Holy Roman Empire, Vienna, 29 March 1797, and of Johann Heinrich von Neumann, nobleman of the Kingdom of Bavaria, Munich, 20 January 1824.
