= John Babington (Royal Navy officer) =

John Herbert Babington
- Born: 6 February 1911; Tai Chow Foo, China
- Died: 25 March 1992 (aged 81); West Oxfordshire, Oxfordshire
- Military career
- Allegiance: United Kingdom
- Branch: Royal Naval Volunteer Reserve
- Rank: Lieutenant Commander
- Unit: HMS President
- Conflicts: World War II: The Blitz
- Awards: George Cross; Officer of the Order of the British Empire
- Other work: Headmaster at the Royal Hospital School

John Herbert Babington, GC, OBE (6 February 1911 – 25 March 1992) was a British teacher and Royal Navy officer who was awarded the George Cross for "great gallantry and undaunted devotion to duty" in defusing bombs during World War II.

== George Cross ==
Following a Luftwaffe air raid on the Royal Navy shore establishment at Chatham Dockyard (HMS Pembroke) Babington defused a bomb which had fallen that was fitted with an anti-withdrawal device. Babington was attached to HMS President in London.

=== Citation ===
Notice of Babington's George Cross appeared in the London Gazette on 27 December 1940.

The King has been graciously pleased to approve the award of the George Cross for great gallantry and undaunted devotion to duty to: Probationary Temporary Sub-Lieutenant (Sp) John Herbert Babington R.N.V.R.

— London Gazette

== Later war career ==
He was later appointed an officer of the Order of the British Empire for gallantry in 1944.

== Postwar career ==
Babington became the Headmaster at the Royal Hospital School and the Ashlyns School, Berkhamsted, the first co-educational bilateral school in Hertfordshire. He was headmaster of Diss Grammar School in Norfolk, England, from 1947 to 1951.
