= Charles Anthony Deane =

English diving engineer and inventor of a surface supplied diving helmet

- Born: 1796
- Died: 1848 (aged 51–52)

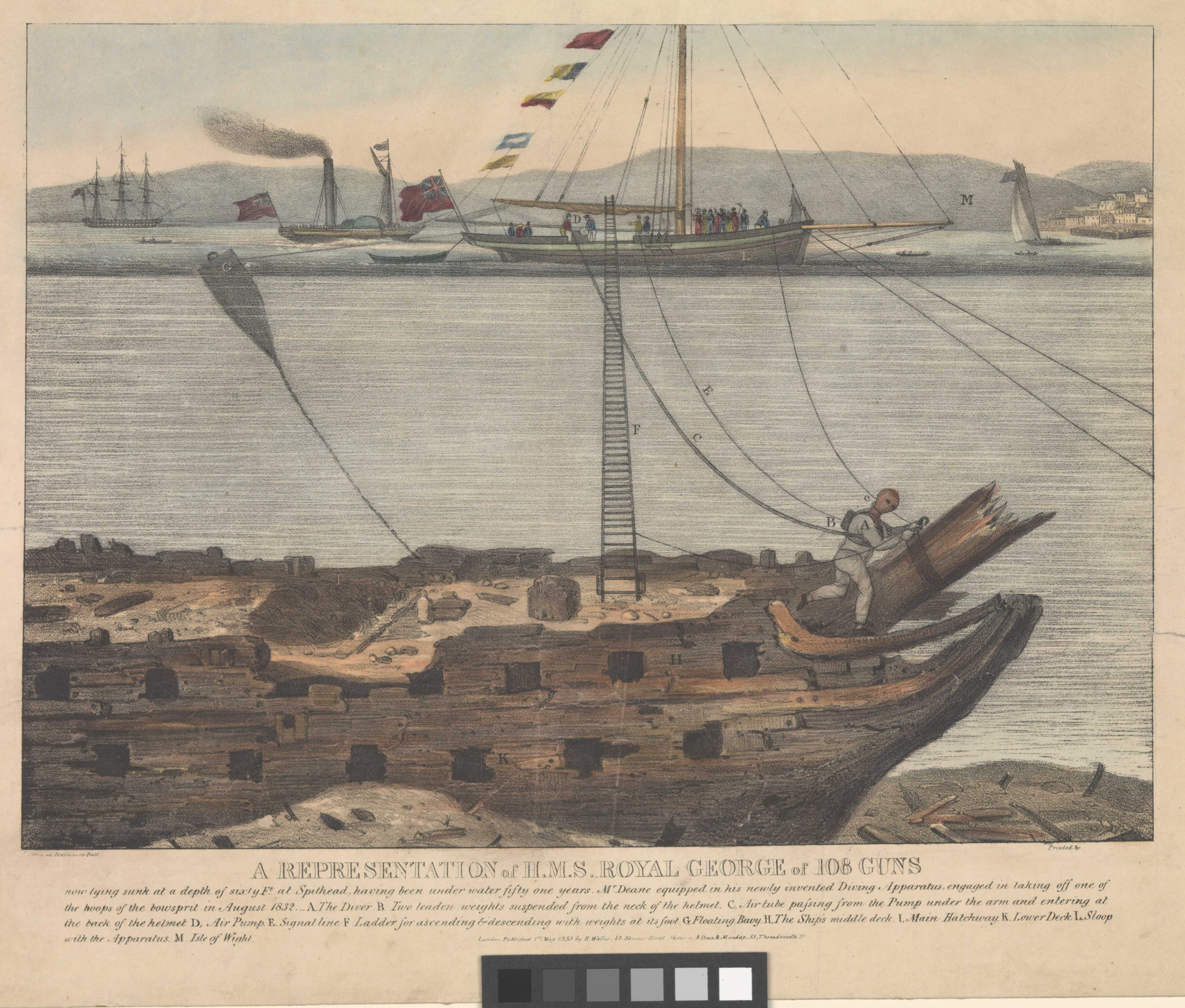
Illustration of Deane exploring the wreck of HMS Royal George in 1832

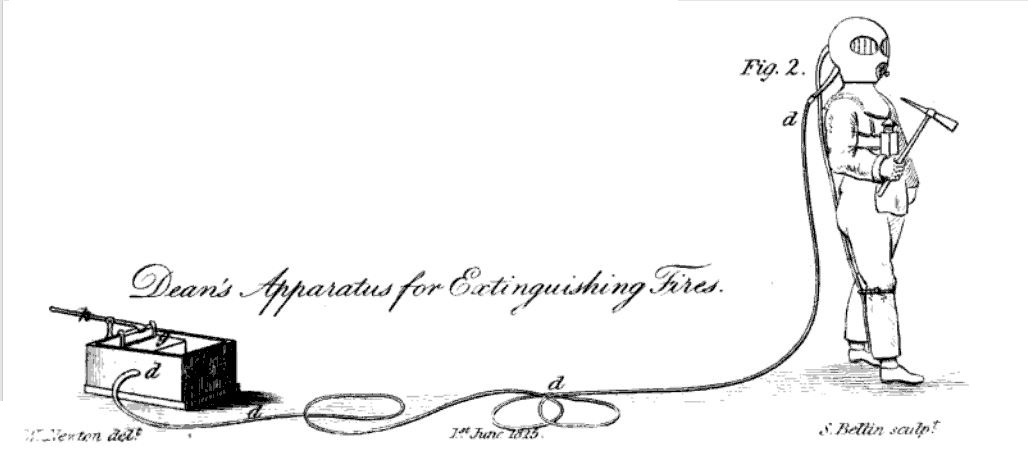
Charles Dean's Apparatus for Extinguishing Fires, 1825.

Charles Anthony Deane (1796 – 1848) was an English diving engineer and the inventor of the diving helmet.

== Life ==
Born in Deptford, Charles and his brother John studied at the Greenwich Hospital School for Boys (the former buildings of which are now the National Maritime Museum) to become merchant seamen, going to sea at the age of 14 for a period of 7 years before returning to Deptford.

Charles Deane then took up employment as a caulker at Barnard's Shipyard. During this time he realised the problem of fighting fires within the holds of ships.

In the 1820s John Deane was present in England when horses were trapped by fire in a stable. To get through the smoke and fire fumes he put on a medieval knight-in-armor helmet air-pumped by hose from a fire brigade water pump, and rescued all the horses. In 1823 he patented a "Smoke Helmet" to be used by firemen in smoke-filled areas; the full title is given as "Apparatus or Machines to be worn by Persons entering Rooms or other places filled with Smoke of other Vapour, for the purpose of extinguishing Fire, or extricating Persons or Property therein". The apparatus comprised a copper helmet with an attached flexible collar and garment. A long leather hose attached to the rear of the helmet was to be used to supply air, the original concept being that it would be pumped using a double bellows. A short pipe allowed breathed air to escape. The garment was to be constructed from leather or airtight cloth, secured by straps.

Charles had insufficient funds to build the equipment himself, so sold his patent to his employer, Edward Barnard. It was not until 1827 that the first smoke helmets were built, by Augustus Siebe. Charles Deane had little success marketing the apparatus as a smoke helmet, so in 1828 he and his brother decided to find another application for it and converted it into a diving helmet and marketed the helmet with a loosely attached "diving suit" so that a diver could perform salvage work but only in a full vertical position, otherwise water entered the suit.

In 1829 the Deane brothers sailed from Whitstable for trials of their new underwater apparatus, establishing the diving industry in the town.

In 1834 Charles used his diving helmet and suit in a successful attempt upon the wreck of Royal George at Spithead, during which he recovered 28 of the ship's cannon.

By 1836 the Deane brothers had produced the world's first diving manual, Method of Using Deane's Patent Diving Apparatus which explained in detail the workings of the apparatus and pump, plus safety precautions.

== Sources ==
- Newton, William; Partington, Charles Frederick (1825), "Charles Anthony Deane - 1823 patent", Newton's London Journal of Arts and Sciences, 9, W. Newton: 341
- Bevan, J (1996). The Infernal Diver. London: Submex. ISBN 0-9508242-1-6.
