= Royal Hospital School =

Public school in Holbrook, Suffolk, England

The Royal Hospital School, Holbrook

Location
- Holbrook, Suffolk, IP9 2RX; England; 51°58′20″N 1°08′59″E

Information
- School type: Public School; Independent boarding and day Royal Foundation Royal Navy Heritage
- Mottoes: 'Celebrating Britain's seafaring heritage through educating for the future' "The Cradle of the Navy" "Fear God and Honour the King" "Otia Tuta" - motto of Greenwich Hospital (Latin: Ease after Toil)
- Religious affiliation: Christian
- Established: 1694 royal charter 1712 Greenwich; 1933 Holbrook
- Founders: William III and Mary II
- Sister school: College of William and Mary
- Local authority: Suffolk
- Trust: Greenwich Hospital
- Department for Education URN: 124889 Tables
- Chair: Chair of Governors; Mr. Trevor Rowell
- Director: Director of Greenwich Hospital; Mrs. Deirdre Mills
- Headmaster: Steven Dixon
- Chaplain: Rev. K Page
- Staff: 72
- Gender: Coeducational
- Age: 11 to 18
- Enrolment: c. 670
- Campus type: Rural
- Houses: 11 Houses: Anson (M); Blake (Junior House); Collingwood (M); Hawke (M); Hood (F); Howe (F); St. Vincent (M); Raleigh (Day House); Cornwallis (Day House); Drake (Day House); Nelson (Upper Sixth)
Colour
School Scarf
- Slogan: Navigating success
- Song: Eternal Father, Strong to Save - Royal Navy Hymn
- Sports: Athletics, Cricket, Hockey, Rugby, Netball, Basketball, Climbing, Cross Country, Fitness, Golf, Football, Horse Riding, Kickboxing, Sailing, Swimming, Tennis.
- Publication: "The Magazine" "The Gidge" - Alumni Magazine
- Feeder to: Historically: Royal Navy; British Army; Royal Air Force; Royal Military Academy Sandhurst; Britannia Royal Naval College
- Affiliation: HMC (The Heads' Conference)
- Alumni: Royal Hospital School Association
- Charitable Association: Greenwich Hospital
- Website: http://www.royalhospitalschool.org

The Royal Hospital School (also known as "RHS" and historically nicknamed "The Cradle of the Navy") is a British co-educational fee-charging international boarding and day school with naval traditions. The school admits pupils aged 11 to 18 (years 7 to 13) through Common Entrance or its own examination. The school is regulated by an act of Parliament, the Greenwich Hospital Act 1865 (28 & 29 Vict. c. 89).

The school is located in the village of Holbrook, near Ipswich, Suffolk, England. The school's campus is in the Queen Anne style and set on 200 acres (0.81 km^{2}) of countryside. It overlooks the River Stour, Suffolk on the Shotley Peninsula in an area known as Constable Country.

The Royal Hospital School was established by a royal charter in 1712. It was originally located at Greenwich Hospital, but then moved in 1933 to East Anglia.

During World War One, 1,000 former RHS pupils served on Royal Navy ships at the Battle of Jutland (31 May – 1 June 1916). At least 101 former RHS pupils died in that battle.

The school is the only United Kingdom independent boarding school to be continuously granted the Queen's Banner. It also flies its own Admiralty-approved Royal Hospital School Blue Ensign. It is one of only two UK schools whose students have the privilege of wearing Royal Navy uniforms, the other being Pangbourne College in Berkshire. The school is affiliated to the Headmasters' and Headmistresses' Conference (HMC).

In 2025, the school was sold to Inspired Learning Group(ILG), joining its portfolio of 31 schools and nurseries.This marks the first time in the school's history that it is no longer under control of Greenwich Hospital.

== Overview ==
Seafaring traditions are important and integral elements of school life, and Royal Navy uniforms (sailor suits) are issued to all pupils and used for ceremonial and formal events. The school is owned by the Crown naval charity, Greenwich Hospital, providing a number of means-tested bursaries for families with a seafaring background.

The school also emphasizes leadership development. The Combined Cadet Force along with the Duke of Edinburgh's Award Scheme are the most popular co-curricular activities at the Royal Hospital School. The Combined Cadet Force also includes a Royal Electrical and Mechanical Engineers Section. The aircraft carrier Illustrious was affiliated with the Royal Navy CCF. The Army Section is affiliated with the Army Air Corps.

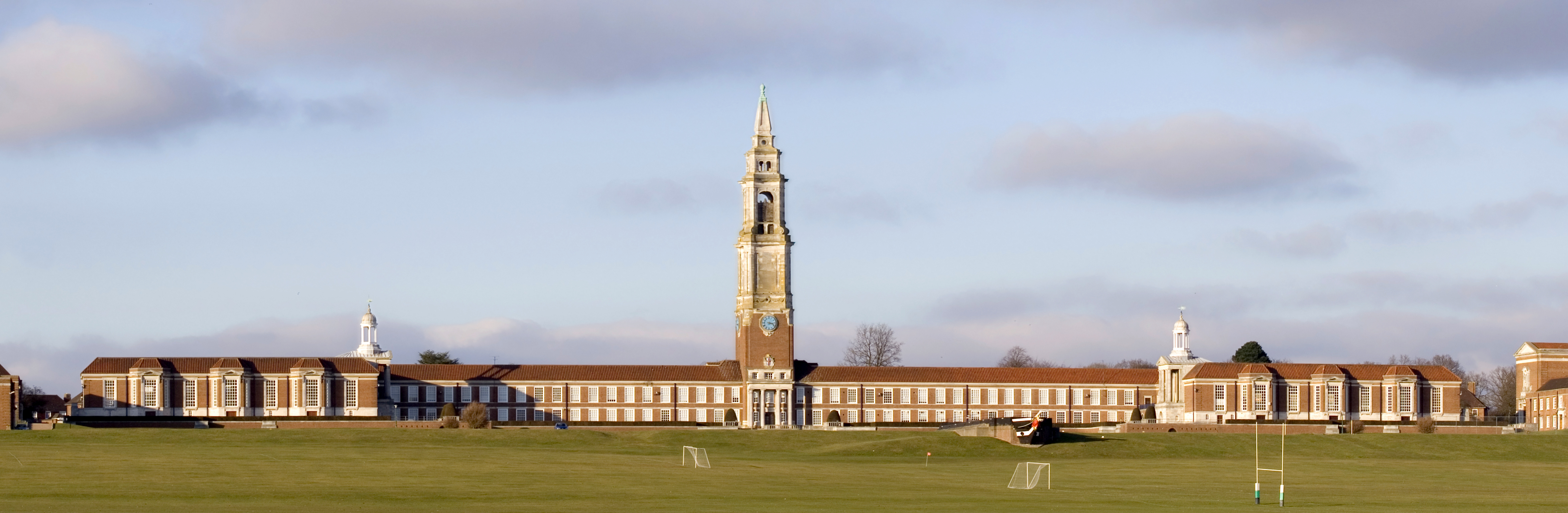
The front of the main building, overlooking the sports pitches

The Royal Hospital School has a partnership with The College of William and Mary in Virginia.

The Royal Hospital School is a boarding and day school with weekly boarding, three-night boarding, and 'flexi' or ad hoc boarding options.

== Pupils ==
As of May 2025, around 670 pupils are enrolled at the school. Approximately 360 students board on a full-time, weekly or 3-night basis. There are around 100 international students from 28 countries. The school has specialist staff for international students and provides English as an Additional Language.

== Curriculum ==
The school uses the National Curriculum Key Stages 3 (Years 7–9), 4 (Years 10–11), and 5 (Years 12–13), and provides a large choice of subjects for study.

Subjects Offered
Subject Name	Years taken	Qualification Type
Compass	Y7 - Y9	N/A
PSHE	Y7 - Y13	N/A
English Language	Y7 - Y11 (Compulsory) Y12 - Y13	GCSE, A-level
English Literature	Y7 - Y11 (Compulsory) Y12 - Y13	GCSE, A-level
Mathematics	Y7 - Y11 (Compulsory) Y12 - Y13	GCSE, A-level
Further Mathematics	Y12 - Y13	A-level
French	Y7 - Y9 (Compulsory OR Spanish) Y10 - Y13	GCSE, A-level
Spanish	Y7 - Y9 (Compulsory OR French) Y10 - Y13	GCSE, A-level
Science (Combined)	Y7 - Y9 (Compulsory) Y10 - 11 (Combined Science)	GCSE
Geography	Y7 - Y9 (Compulsory) Y10 - Y13	GCSE, A-level
History	Y7 - Y9 (Compulsory) Y10 - Y13	GCSE, A-level
Design Technology	Y7 - Y8 (Compulsory) Y9 - Y13	GCSE, A-level
Art	Y7 - Y8 (Compulsory) Y9 - Y13	GCSE, A-level
Music	Y7 - Y8 (Compulsory) Y9 - Y13	GCSE, A-level
Drama	Y7 - Y8 (Compulsory) Y9 - Y13	GCSE, A-level
Computing	Y7 - Y9 (Compulsory) Y10 - Y13	GCSE, A-level
Religious Studies	Y7 - Y9 (Compulsory) Y10 - Y13	GCSE, A-level
Latin	Y7 - Y8 (Compulsory) Y9 - Y13	GCSE, A-level
Biology	Y10 - Y11 (Separate Science) Y12 - Y13	GCSE, A-level
Chemistry	Y10 - Y11 (Separate Science) Y12 - Y13	GCSE, A-level
Physics	Y10 - Y11 (Separate Science) Y12 - Y13	GCSE, A-level
Enterprise and Entrepreneurship	Y12 - Y13	BTEC
Business Studies	Y10 - Y13	GCSE, A-level
Media Studies	Y10 - Y13	GCSE, BTEC
Physical Studies	Y10 - Y13	GCSE, BTEC
Psychology	Y12 - Y13	A-level
Politics	Y12 - Y13	A-level

== Co-Curricular ==
=== CCF ===
When a student reaches year 9, they are given the option to in the Combined Cadet Force (CCF). As part of CCF, pupils can participate in a wide range of activities including: first aid, navigation, shooting, field craft, and self-reliance; with opportunities for students to participate in section competitions against other schools/cadets. There are also opportunities for sailing, flying, rock-climbing, coasteering, power-boating and many other outdoor pursuits. Alongside air-rifle, small bore and Cadet GP Rifle shooting in the school's own shooting range.

=== DofE ===
Similarly to CCF, all year 9 pupils are given the option to sign up the "Duke of Edinburgh's Award Scheme" as part of the Co-Curricular scheme, run by the school. Expeditions for Bronze, Silver and Gold take place annually; with Bronze taking place locally, Silver taking place in the Peak District and with Gold taking place in Scotland (usually Rannoch Moor).

== History ==
The school was originally located at Greenwich Hospital, in what is now the National Maritime Museum in Greenwich, London. The Hospital was founded in 1694, and the school in 1712, both by royal charter. In the 1820s, the Royal Naval Asylum school was incorporated into the school. The original purpose of the school was to provide assistance and education to the orphans of seafarers in the Royal and Merchant Navies, and it was once the largest school for navigation and seamanship in the country.

The school relocated to Holbrook in 1933. The Holbrook campus was designed by the Birmingham-based arts and crafts architect Herbert Tudor Buckland and built by J. Gerrard & Sons Ltd of Swinton. Most of the buildings are now Grade II listed, with the chapel also being Grade II*.

Historically, the Royal Hospital School exclusively admitted children or grandchildren of seafarers. This policy was in place until the mid-20th century. During this period, up until the 1950s, it was also mandatory for boys attending the school to pursue careers in the Royal or Merchant Navies. Consequently, the curriculum was heavily centred around maritime subjects. Although these requirements have been discontinued for several decades, the school continues to uphold certain naval traditions. These include wearing naval uniforms, conducting divisions (formal parades and march-pasts typical in the armed forces), and incorporating marching as part of the school's activities.

In 1991 the school became coeducational, with the girls first being introduced into Hood house, followed by Cornwallis, Howe and Blake (now co-educational) and Anson. Girls initially had a different naval uniform from boys, but this was changed to match the boys' uniform, and subsequently followed the changes in dress as seen in the Royal Navy. The first female Head of School was appointed in 1992 to work alongside the male Head of School.

In 1994 the entire school was bussed to Greenwich Hospital to parade in front of Queen Elizabeth II, in celebration of the tercentenary of the Hospital. The parade took place on the parade ground in front of the Queen's House. In 2012 the school marked three hundred years since its foundation with the opening of a Heritage Centre and publication of a commemorative book.

In 2005 RHS was one of 50 of the country's leading independent schools which were found guilty of running an illegal price-fixing cartel which had allowed them to drive up fees for thousands of parents. Each school was required to pay a nominal penalty of £10,000, and all agreed to make ex-gratia payments totaling £3 million into a trust designed to benefit pupils who attended the schools during the period in which fee information was shared.

In mid-November 2025 RHS was bought from Greenwich Hospital by the Inspired Learning Group (ILG). This led changes to the way the school is run, including Greenwich removing the school's right to the Greenwich naval jack for flag ceremonies.

== Greenwich Hospital ==
Greenwich Pensioner, 1845

The school was founded by royal charter and is maintained by Greenwich Hospital. The hospital provides bursaries to a number of pupils. The school also awards academic, sports, music and sailing scholarships, as well as bursaries and discounts to the children of seafarers in the Royal Navy, Royal Marines or Merchant Navy.

== Traditions ==
Boys of The Royal Hospital School, Greenwich c.1900

Many of the modern-day Royal Hospital School traditions are associated with the Royal Navy or seafaring. For example, key naval events are celebrated, as the school has provision for sailing, and has a ceremonial guard and marching band.

=== Naval uniforms ===
As well as standard school uniform, both boys and girls wear Naval uniforms for ceremonial occasions such as "Divisions." This is a ceremony in which each house forms two squads, Junior and Senior, and performs a march on the parade square, with music played by the marching band and the Guard of Honour holds a key role. All house petty officers (POs) wear a chevron on their left arm. The school's chiefs, approximately 20 Upper 6th Formers, wear chief petty officer ranks and uniform, including canes. The deputy heads of school (two boy and two girl prefects) carry the rank of warrant officer (second class). The heads of school (one boy and one girl prefect) carry the rank of warrant officer (first class).

The Royal Hospital School
The Royal Hospital School	Head of school	Deputy head of school	School Chief	House; Petty officer

=== Music ===
The Royal Hospital School has a distinctive musical tradition, with all pupils required to attend weekly congregation practice. The £3.6 million Reade Music School opened in 2008.

The Royal Hospital School marching band is a perennial part of school life. The band is managed by a former member of the Royal Marines Band Service, and the band's style is modelled on the Royal Marines. When the school forms up in divisions on the parade square, the band forms a separate division, larger than the others. It has travelled abroad for tours including to Sri Lanka and the USA. Some of the marches played include Heart of Oak, A Life on the Ocean Wave, "Holbrook March" and Royal Salute.

Band members were part of the orchestra for the premier performance of Benjamin Britten's Noye's Fludde on 18 June 1958 in Orford Church, Suffolk, as part of the Aldeburgh Festival, with the English Opera Group and a local cast.

The grand organ, a four-manual instrument, by William Hill & Son & Norman & Beard Ltd. was installed in the chapel in 1933.

=== School songs ===
- "Go Forth With God" by Martin Shaw to the tune of Toc H.
- "Eternal Father, Strong to Save"
- "Holbrook" composed for the school by lifelong supporter Benjamin Britten
- ”Holbrook March” composed for the school by former Principal Director of Music Royal Marines, Lt Col Sir Vivian Dunn KCVO OBE FRSA Royal Marines
- "Jerusalem"

=== Events ===
- Burns Night
- House Shout
- School Plays and Musicals
- Music Recitals and Concerts
- Christmas Dinner
- Alumni Reunion including Sporting Events
- Trafalgar Dinner
- Speech Day
- Remembrance Sunday
- Leavers Ball

=== School slang ===
RHS has developed a number of small traditions and practices over its 300 years of existence, with many still in use today. Many of these slang phrases have roots in the navy, but many are also unique to RHS and its traditions

- "Divis" or "Divvies" short for Divisions
- "DH" short for Dining Hall
- "Civvies" slang for civilian clothing
- "Chiefs" slang for school prefects
- "Congo" short for congregational practice
- "Mess" naval slang for a meal
- "Stand easy" slang for break time

== Chapel ==
The chapel is central to RHS life. It is compulsory for pupils to attend a short service every Tuesday and Thursday morning. Congregational practice is also held within the chapel every Saturday morning. A service is held most Sundays, compulsory for any boarders on site. As part of the chapel service, it is common for a musician (usually a music scholar) to play a small piece as part of the service during the week. The mosaics in the apse are by Eric Newton, later to become art critic to The Guardian. The chapel is a Grade II* listed building.

== Royal Foundation ==
The Royal Hospital School has connections with the British royal family. These connections are principally The royal charter, School Visitor, and King's & Queen's Banners. The school's political breadth is shown by both its acknowledgement of its royal connections and its honouring the great republican hero, Robert Blake (admiral), after whom a House is named.

Many members of the royal family have involved themselves with the development of the school. Mary II's involvement with the Royal Hospital School is noted as "the darling object of her life".

- William III and Mary II – First Benefactors.
- Queen Anne – Donated confiscated properties of Captain Kidd.
- George II – presented assets from confiscated properties of the Earl of Derwentwater.
- George VI – Laid the foundation stone at Holbrook on 26 October 1928 (as the Duke of York).
- Queen Elizabeth The Queen Mother – presented the Royal Banner to the Royal Hospital School.

== Sports ==
The school has inter-house sporting events and there are opportunities to enter inter-school competitions. Some school alumni have also gone on to be professional athletes.

The main sports at the school are as follows:

- Michaelmas Term: Boys – rugby union and sailing, Girls – hockey and sailing
- Lent Term: Boys – hockey, cross country, rugby 7s and sailing, Girls – netball, cross country and sailing
- Summer Term: Boys – cricket, athletics, tennis and sailing, Girls – cricket, tennis, athletics and sailing

The school has 96 acres of sports fields, an all-weather pitch, tennis and netball courts, squash courts, a sports hall, fitness suite, strength and conditioning room, martial arts studio, climbing wall, indoor pool, golf course, nearby equestrian facilities (Bylam Livery Stables) and the majority of the sailing programme is delivered at Alton Water that neighbours the school.

Sailing is available to students all year round and the school takes pride in its rank as one of the best sailing schools in the country, with many students representing their nations at world sailing events. As well as the possibility to sail in school, a biennial sailing trip is offered to the school's sailors – the most recent trip having been Australia in 2017 and Greece in 2015.

== Royal Hospital School Association ==
The Royal Hospital School Association (RHSA) is a collective of alumni and former staff from the Royal Hospital School. Initially established in 1925 as the Greenwich Royal Hospital School Old Boys Association, it adopted its current name in 1992 to inclusively represent both male and female former students. The association regularly connects its members and keeps them informed about recent developments and events through its newsletter, Otia Tuta, which is published on an irregular basis.

The association holds an annual reunion at the school in June.

== Notable former pupils ==
- Sir Gilbert Thomas Carter (1848–1927), Administrator and Governor in Africa and the Caribbean
- Malcolm Cooper (1947–2001) – British marksman who won Olympic gold medals at Los Angeles and Seoul and beat or equalled 15 world records
- Professor Bernard de Neumann (1943–2018) – Mathematician
- John Deane (1800–1884) and Charles Deane – inventors of the diving helmet, and discoverers of the wreck of the Mary Rose in 1839, whilst clearing the wreck of the Royal George.
- Admiral Sir Philip King Enright, KBE, CB (1894–1960)
- Ernest Joyce, AM (1875–1940) – Antarctic Explorer, hero of the Ross Sea Party of Shackleton's ill-fated Imperial Trans-Antarctic Expedition.
- Rear-Admiral Stanley McArdle, GM (1922–2007)
- Admiral Arthur Phillip (1738–1814) – founder of Sydney, Australia and the Governor of the first European colony on the continent (New South Wales)
- Commander Harry Pursey MP (1891–1980) – Member of Parliament for Kingston upon Hull East 1945–70
- Peter Richards (1978–) – Rugby player for England, Gloucester and London Irish.
- Duncan Scott-Ford (1921–1942) attended 1933–37. Youngest person to be executed under the Treachery Act 1940.
- Captain Thomas Henry Tizard (1839–1924) – Oceanographer, Hydrographic surveyor and Navigator
- Don Topley (1964–)- Essex CCC and coach of Zimbabwe.
- Reece Topley (1994–), England cricketer
- Admiral Sir Henry Felix Woods, Pasha, (1843–1929) – Admiral in the Turkish Navy
- Hannah Stodel, (1985–), Paralympian

== Notable staff ==
- Edward Riddle, FRAS (1786–1854), astronomer, mathematician and teacher of navigation. Highly esteemed teacher; senior mathematics master in the Upper School (1821–1840); headmaster of the Upper School (1840–1841); and then of the Nautical School (1841–1851). Author of an authoritative book Treatise on Navigation and Nautical Astronomy that was used throughout the world and ran to eight editions (1st edition 1821).
- The Revd George Fisher, FRS, FRAS (1794–1873) Astronomer, Arctic explorer. Chaplain (1834–1863); Headmaster of the Upper School (1834–1840); Principal of the schools (1860–1863). Noted for his pioneering work in numerical educational attainment assessment.
- T/Sub-Lieut.John Herbert Babington, GC, OBE, Royal Naval Volunteer Reserve. Awarded George Cross for bomb disposal work 27 December 1940. Headmaster 1951–1955.
- Andrew Doyle, Comedian and contributor to GB News. English teacher and tutor in Collingwood House
- Simon Warr, television and radio presenter. French and Latin master, also managed the school plays and Football and Rugby teams

== See also ==
- Christ's Hospital
- Pangbourne College
- Welbeck College
- Eton College
