= Martin Waghorn =

Captain Martin Waghorn
- Died: 17 December 1787
- Military career
- Allegiance: Great Britain
- Branch: Royal Navy
- Service years: – 1787
- Rank: Post-Captain
- Commands: HMS Fly; HMS Royal George; HMS Trusty
- Conflicts: Seven Years' War; American War of Independence

Martin Waghorn (died 17 December 1787) was an officer of the Royal Navy. He served during the Seven Years' War and the American War of Independence, but is chiefly remembered for being commanding officer of HMS Royal George when she suddenly sank at Spithead in 1782, with heavy loss of life.

== Career ==
Little is known about Waghorn's early life, but he was promoted on 16 December 1762 by Vice-admiral Sir Samuel Cornish to be lieutenant of the Manila, one of the prizes taken at the Battle of Manila, which, though then commissioned, was not put on the list of the navy. In the following August he was appointed, also by Cornish, to the frigate HMS Liverpool, and in her he returned to England. In November 1764 he was put on half-pay, and so remained for nearly fourteen years. It is possible that during this time he was at sea in merchant ships. It does not appear that he was a man of property, and the half- pay of 2s., a day was clearly not sufficient to maintain him in idleness.

On 18 March 1778 he was appointed to the 100-gun HMS Victory, then fitting for the flag of Admiral Augustus Keppel. He seems to have continued in the Victory for upwards of three years, under the flag of Sir Charles Hardy and then Sir Francis Geary, during the greater part of which time Richard Kempenfelt, who had probably known something of Waghorn in the East Indies, was captain of the fleet. On 15 August 1781 Waghorn was promoted to be commander of the sloop HMS Fly, and on 6 April 1782 to be captain of the 100-gun HMS Royal George, in which Kempenfelt, now a rear-admiral, hoisted his flag. He was still captain of the Royal George when she sank at Spithead on 29 August 1782. Waghorn was thrown into the water, and, though much bruised, was able to keep afloat till he was picked up. At the court-martial held on 9 September on Waghorn and the other survivors the circumstances of the accident were fully inquired into, and the decision of the court, in acquitting Waghorn and the others of all blame, was 'that the ship was not overheeled; that the captain, officers, and ship's company used every exertion to right the ship as soon as the alarm was given of her settling;' and it expressed the distinct opinion, 'from the short space of time between the alarm being given and the sinking of the ship, that some material part of her frame gave way, which can only be accounted for by the general state of the decay of her timbers.'

This is so contrary to the opinion noised abroad at the time, and impressed on popular memory by a poem by William Cowper, that it may be well to add that the court was composed of the full number of officers—thirteen—all capable men, many of them of very high distinction—Samuel Barrington, Mark Milbanke, Alexander Hood, William Hotham, John Leveson Gower, Sir John Jervis, Adam Duncan. On his acquittal Waghorn was put on half-pay; in September 1783 he was appointed to the 50-gun HMS Trusty, as flag-captain to Commodore Sir John Lindsay in the Mediterranean. The ship was paid off in July 1785, and Waghorn was again put on half-pay.

== Personal life ==
Waghorn died on 17 December 1787.
