= John Deane (inventor) =

Joint inventor of the diving helmet

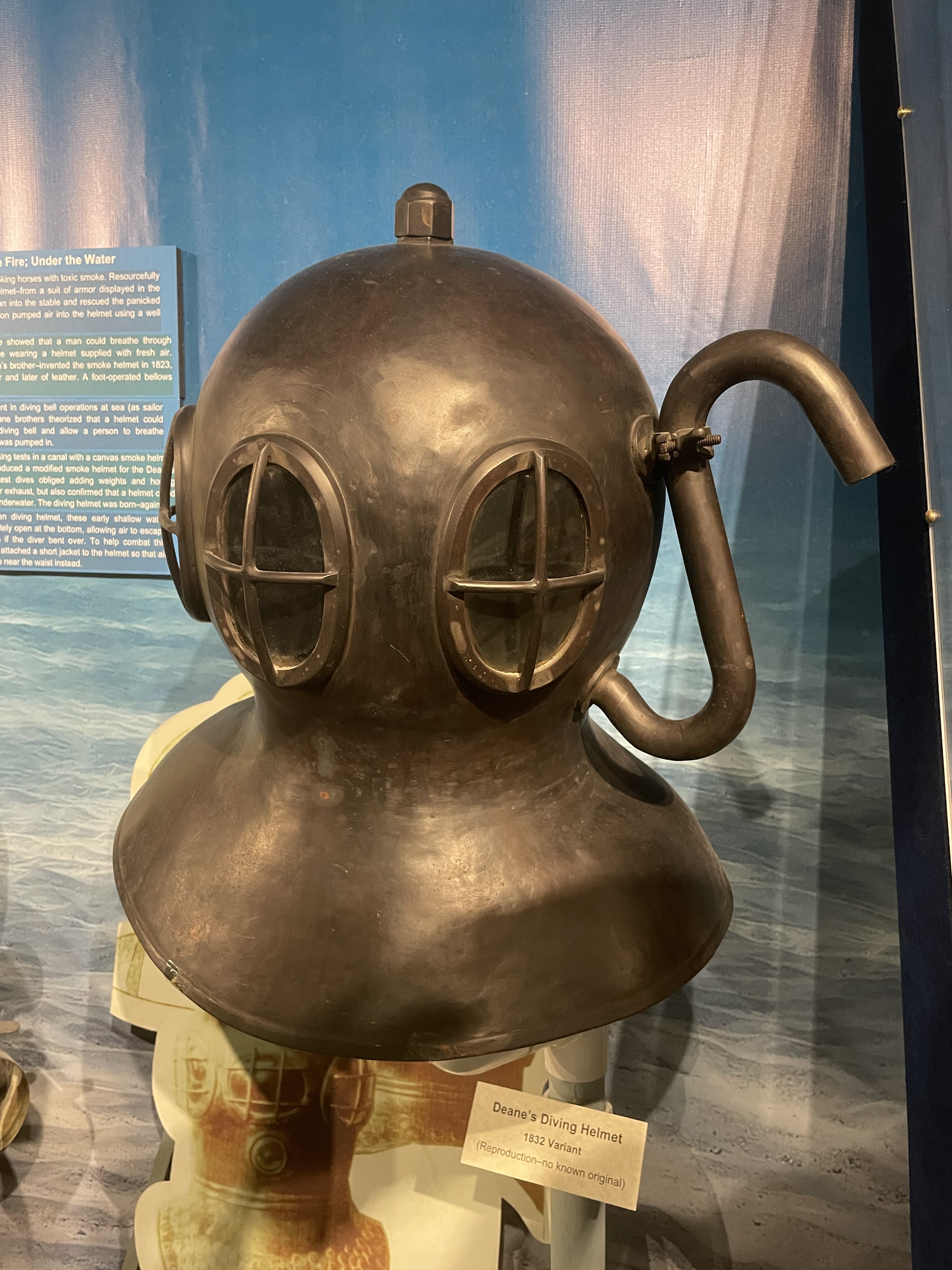
Deane Brothers diving helmet, replica

John Deane (1800–1884; known as The Infernal Diver), with his brother Charles, invented the diving helmet and performed diving operations at the wreck of the Mary Rose. They received their education at The Royal Hospital School, Greenwich and were both in attendance in 1812. When he was 14, John joined the East India Company and sailed for seven years.

In the 1820s, John was present in England when horses were trapped by fire in a stable. To get through the smoke and fire fumes he put on a medieval knight-in-armour helmet air-pumped by hose from a fire brigade water pump and rescued all the horses. In 1823, he patented a "Smoke Helmet" to be used by firemen in smoke-filled areas; the full title is given as "Apparatus or Machines to be worn by Persons entering Rooms or other places filled with Smoke of other Vapour, for the purpose of extinguishing Fire, or extricating Persons or Property therein". The apparatus comprised a copper helmet with an attached flexible collar and garment. A long leather hose attached to the rear of the helmet was to be used to supply air, the original concept being that it would be pumped using a double bellows. A short pipe allowed breathed air to escape. The garment was to be constructed from leather or airtight cloth, secured by straps.

Later, it was developed into a diving apparatus. After several private trials in the Thames they were having difficulty bringing the invention to the serious attention of the admiralty until they approached the Governor of the Greenwich Hospital, Admiral Sir Richard Goodwin Keats. Following that interview they were able to write to the Admiralty they would be proud to make a descent in their presence, now having a convenient vessel lying off the steps of the Royal Hospital Greenwich near the Admiral's residence, which vessel with the Governor's consent would be allowed to remain to await their Lordships' pleasure. The Admiralty had little option but to attend, and shortly thereafter official trials were undertaken at the Sheerness dockyard, and patents were obtained. The Deanes became full time divers.

In 1829, the Deane brothers sailed from Whitstable for trials of their new underwater apparatus, establishing the diving industry in the town.

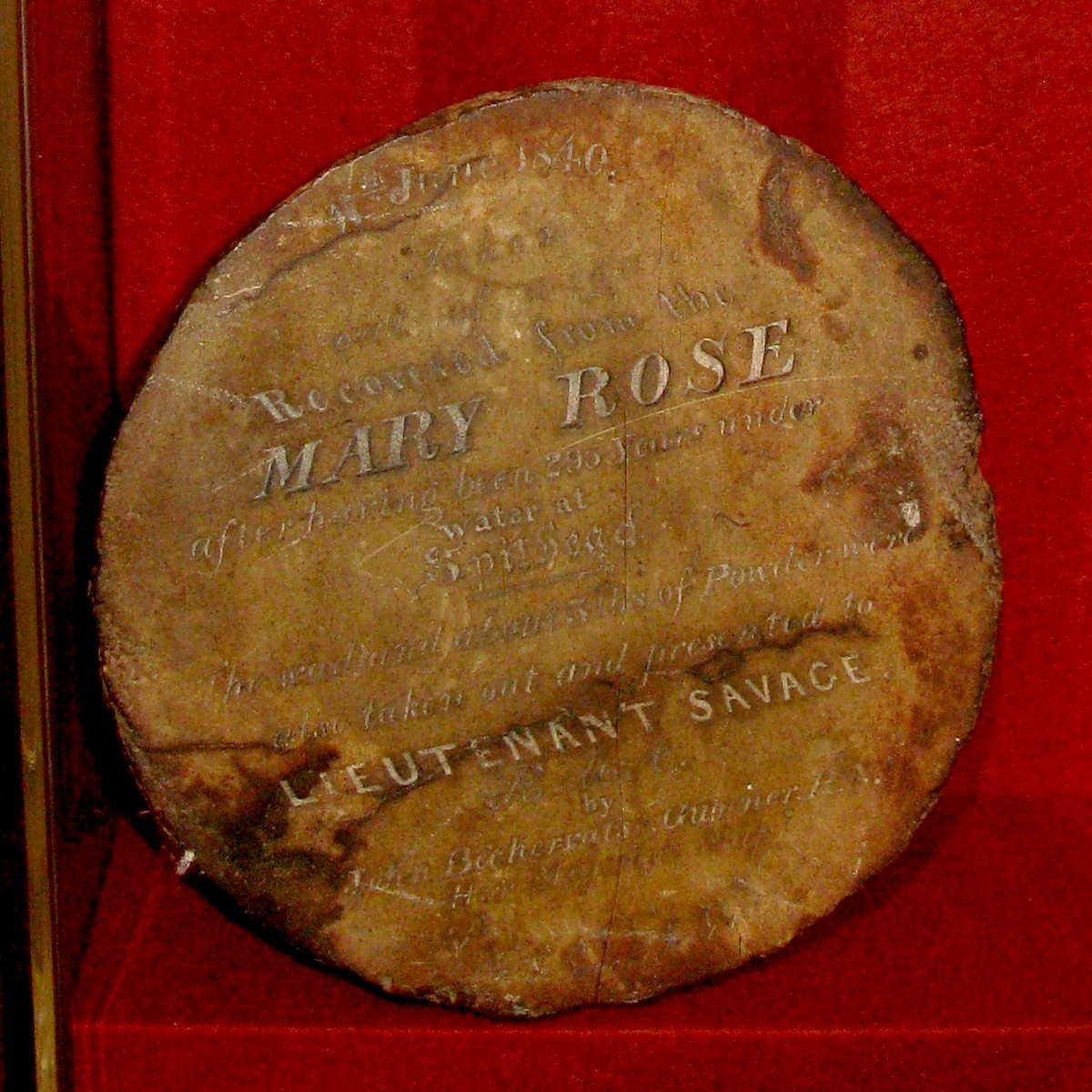
A cannonball that John Deane recovered from the wreck of the Mary Rose

In 1830 John and his diving partner, George Bell, salvaged the cannons from the wreck of the Guernsey Lily. Seven of these cannon are now located at Quex Park, Birchington.

On 16 June 1836, the Mary Rose shipwreck was discovered when a fishing net caught on the wreck. John and his partner William Edwards, recovered timbers, guns, longbows, and other items from the shipwreck. The location of the shipwreck was forgotten after Deane stopped work on the site of the shipwreck in 1840.

William Edwards was his partner between 1834 and 1855. Edwards died in the Crimean War (1854–1856).

George Hall was the bell diver who collaborated with the Deanes in the development of their diving apparatus. He is credited with first teaching the Royal Sappers & Miners and Royal Engineers to dive during the salvage of the Royal George, 1839–40.

Deane is known to have given a series of lectures in 1847 on "diving and submarine operations" at the Assembly Rooms in Whitstable. Charles and John Deane exhibited their invention in the Great Exhibition of 1851.

John, working for the Admiralty, cleared the Russian wrecks from Sevastopol harbour during the Crimean War. Sarah Ann Browning managed Deane's business affairs when he was working in Crimea between 1854 and 1856.

He married Sarah Ann Browning at St Alphege Church, Whitstable, in October 1856 on his return from the Crimean War. Sarah Deane, John Deane's second wife, is buried at Millstroode Cemetery, Whitstable.

He died in 1884 and was buried in Ramsgate.
