= History of underwater diving =

Developments over time in the human activity

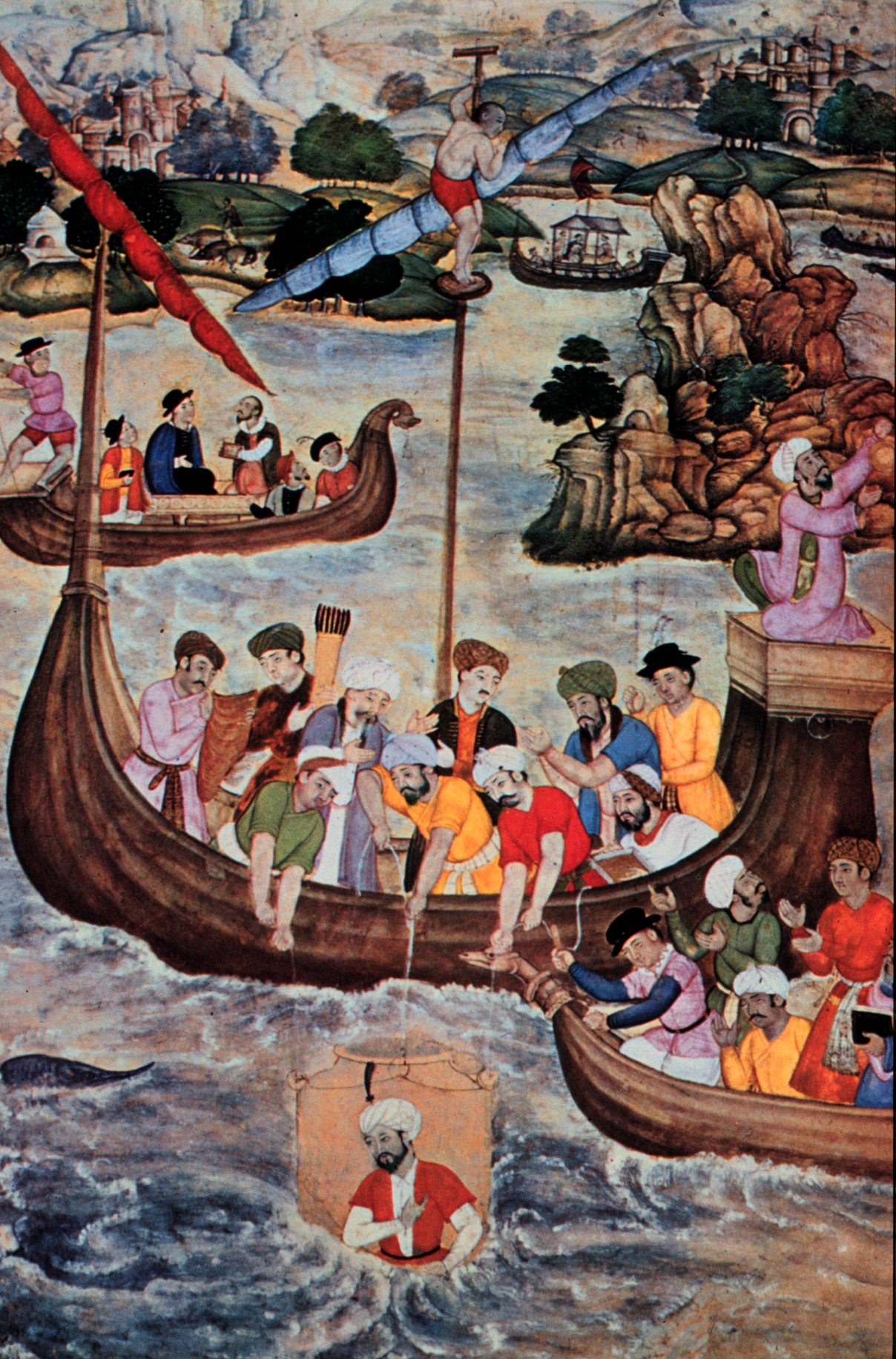
16th century Islamic painting of Alexander the Great lowered in a glass diving bell

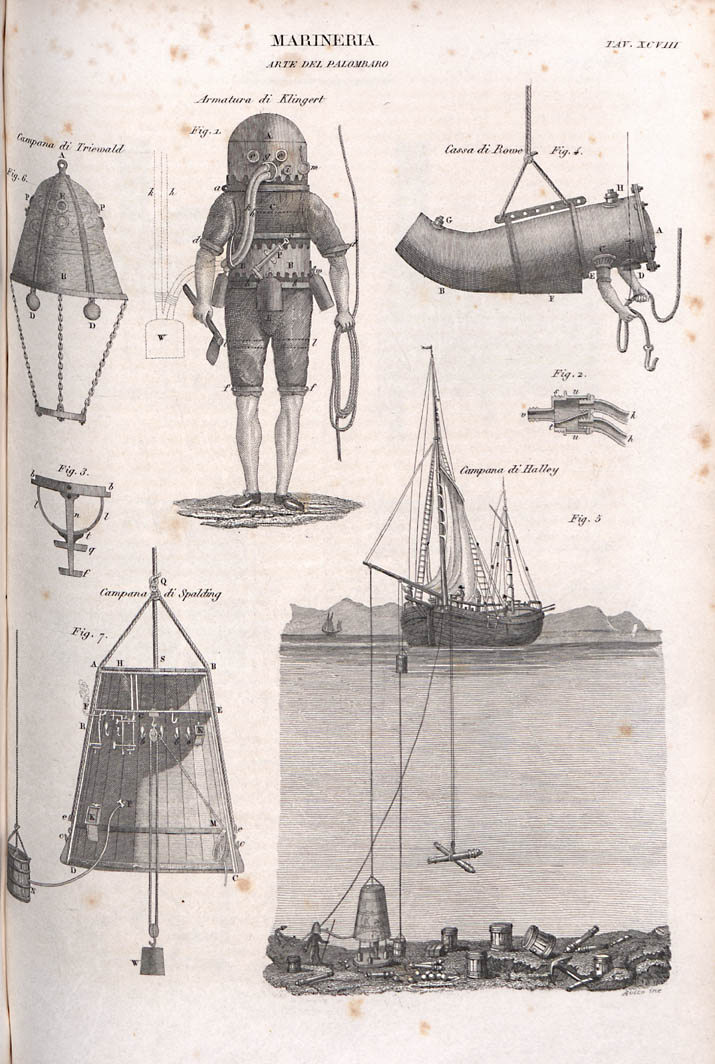
1849 illustration of various diving equipment

The history of underwater diving starts with freediving as a widespread means of hunting and gathering, both for food and other valuable resources such as pearls and coral. By classical Greek and Roman times commercial applications such as sponge diving and marine salvage were established. Military diving also has a long history, going back at least as far as the Peloponnesian War, with recreational and sporting applications being a recent development. Technological development in ambient pressure diving started with stone weights (skandalopetra) for fast descent. In the 16th and 17th centuries diving bells became functionally useful when a renewable supply of air could be provided to the diver at depth, and progressed to surface-supplied diving helmets—in effect miniature diving bells covering the diver's head and supplied with compressed air by manually operated pumps—which were improved by attaching a waterproof suit to the helmet and in the early 19th century became the standard diving dress.

Limitations in the mobility of the surface-supplied systems encouraged the development of both open circuit and closed circuit scuba in the 20th century, which allow the diver a much greater autonomy. These also became popular during World War II for clandestine military operations, and post-war for scientific, search and rescue, media diving, recreational and technical diving. The heavy free-flow surface-supplied copper helmets evolved into lightweight demand helmets, which are more economical with breathing gas, which is particularly important for deeper dives and expensive helium based breathing mixtures, and saturation diving reduced the risks of decompression sickness for deep and long exposures.

An alternative approach was the development of the "single atmosphere" or armoured suit, which isolates the diver from the pressure at depth, at the cost of great mechanical complexity and limited dexterity. The technology first became practicable in the middle 20th century. Isolation of the diver from the environment was taken further by the development of remotely operated underwater vehicles in the late 20th century, where the operator controls the ROV from the surface, and autonomous underwater vehicles, which dispense with an operator altogether. All of these modes are still in use and each has a range of applications where it has advantages over the others, though diving bells have largely been relegated to a means of transport for surface-supplied divers. In some cases, combinations are particularly effective, such as the simultaneous use of surface orientated or saturation surface-supplied diving equipment and work or observation class remotely operated vehicles.

Although the pathophysiology of decompression sickness is not yet fully understood, decompression practice has reached a stage where the risk is fairly low, and most incidences are successfully treated by therapeutic recompression and hyperbaric oxygen therapy. Mixed breathing gases are routinely used to reduce the effects of the hyperbaric environment on ambient pressure divers.

The history of underwater diving can also be understood as a history of changing forms of access to the underwater environment. Technological developments progressively extended human capabilities from brief direct immersion to prolonged, autonomous and remotely mediated forms of underwater exploration. This perspective forms part of the concept of "Sub-Oceanic History", proposed by Michael W. Jung, which examines the historical relationship between access, knowledge production and control in the exploration and use of the ocean interior.

== Freediving ==
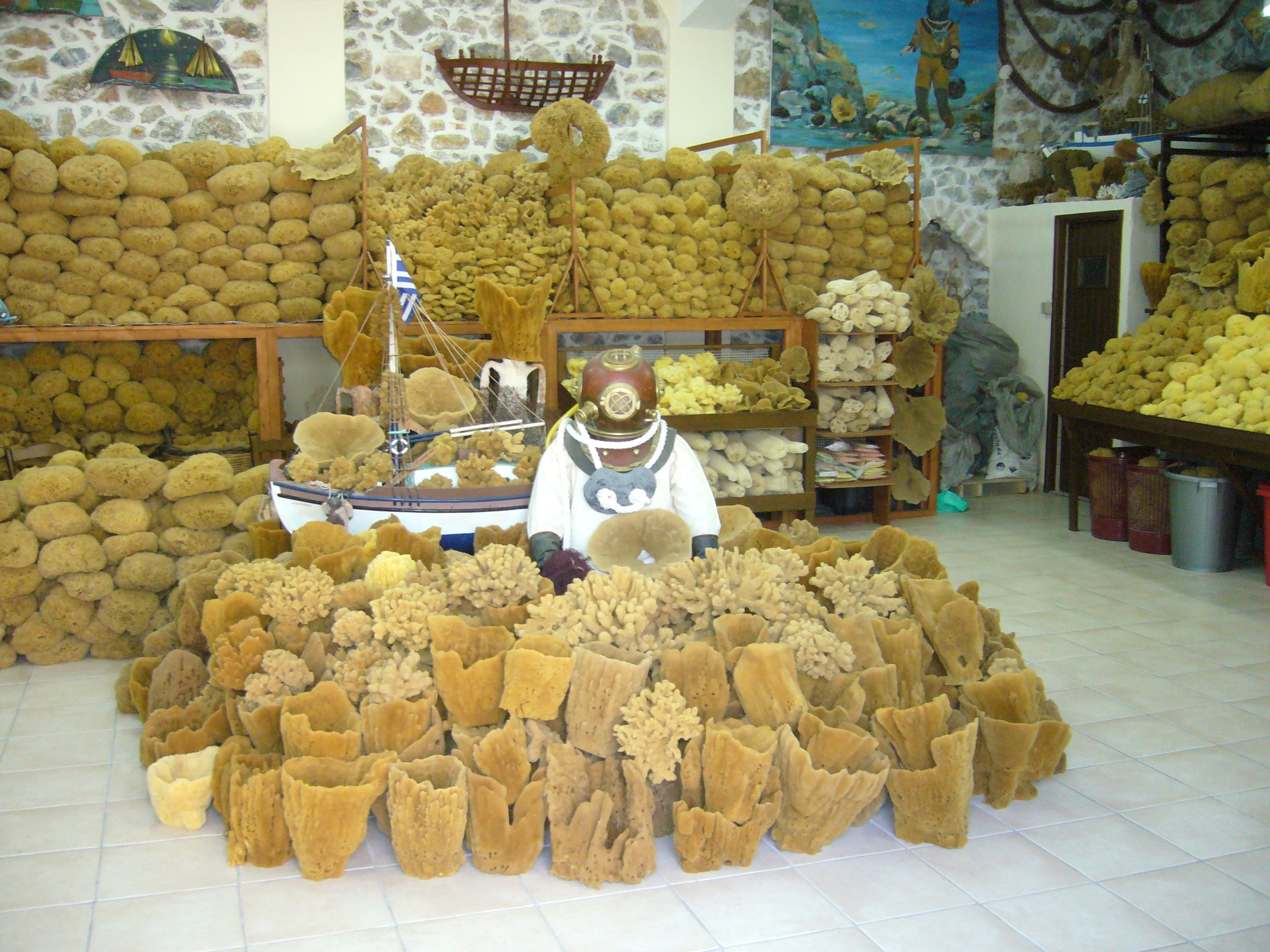
Natural sponges have been harvested by free divers near the Greek island of Kalymnos since at least the time of Plato.

Underwater diving was practiced in ancient cultures to gather food and other valuable resources such as pearls and precious coral, and later to reclaim sunken valuables, and to help aid military campaigns. Breathhold diving was the only method available, occasionally using reed snorkels in shallow water, and stone weights for deeper dives.

Underwater diving for commercial purposes began in Ancient Greece (500 BC), since both Plato and Homer mention the sponge as being used for bathing. The island of Kalymnos was a main centre of diving for sponges. By using weights (skandalopetra) of as much as 15 kilograms (33 lb) to speed the descent, breath-holding divers would descend to depths up to 30 metres (98 ft) for as much as five minutes to collect sponges. Sponges were not the only valuable harvest to be found on the sea floor; the harvesting of red coral was also quite popular. A variety of valuable shells or fish could be harvested in this way, creating a demand for divers to harvest the treasures of the sea, which could also include the sunken riches of other seafarers.

The Mediterranean Sea had large amounts of sea trade. As a result, there were many shipwrecks, so divers were often hired to salvage whatever they could from the seabed. Divers would swim down to the wreck and choose the pieces to salvage.

Divers were also used in warfare. They could be used for underwater reconnaissance when ships were approaching an enemy harbor, and if underwater defenses were found, the divers would disassemble them if possible. During the Peloponnesian War, divers were used to get past enemy blockades to relay messages and provide supplies to allies or troops that were cut off by the blockade. These divers and swimmers were occasionally used as saboteurs, drilling holes in enemy hulls, cutting ships rigging and mooring lines.

In Japan, the Ama divers began to collect pearls about 2,000 years ago. Free-diving was the primary source of income for many Persian Gulf nationals such as Qataris, Emiratis, Bahrainis, and Kuwaitis. As a result, Qatari, Emirati, and Bahraini heritage promoters have popularized recreational and serious events associated with freediving, underwater equipment, and related activities such as snorkeling.

== Diving bells ==
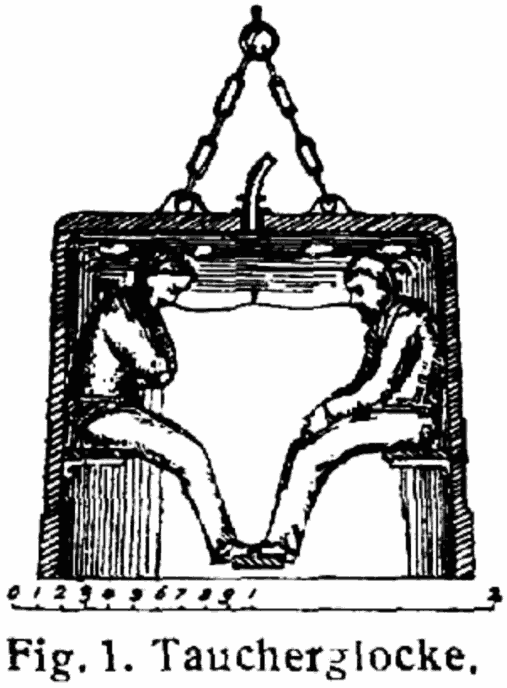
Illustration of an occupied diving bell.

The diving bell is one of the earliest types of equipment for underwater work and exploration. Its use was first described by Aristotle in the 4th century BC: "...they enable the divers to respire equally well by letting down a cauldron, for this does not fill with water, but retains the air, for it is forced straight down into the water." According to Roger Bacon, Alexander the Great explored the Mediterranean on the authority of Ethicus the astronomer.

Diving bells were developed in the 16th and 17th century as the first significant mechanical aid to underwater diving. They were rigid open-bottomed chambers lowered into the water and ballasted to remain upright and to sink even when full of air.

The first reliably recorded use of a diving bell was by Guglielmo de Lorena in 1535 to explore Caligula's barges in Lake Nemi. In 1616, Franz Kessler built an improved diving bell.

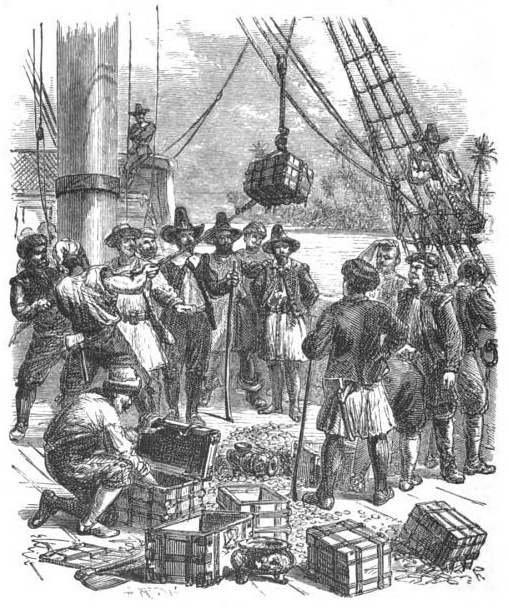
Sir William Phipps used a diving bell to salvage tremendous wealth from a sunken Spanish treasure ship.

In 1658, Albrecht von Treileben was contracted by King Gustavus Adolphus of Sweden to salvage the warship Vasa, which sank outside Stockholm harbor in about 32 metres (105 ft) of water on its maiden voyage in 1628. Between 1663 and 1665 von Treileben's divers were successful in raising most of the cannon, working from a diving bell with an estimated free air capacity of about 530 litres (120 imp gal; 140 US gal) for periods of about 15 minutes at a time in dark water with a temperature of about 4 °C (39 °F). In late 1686, Sir William Phipps convinced investors to fund an expedition to what is now Haiti and the Dominican Republic to find sunken treasure, despite the location of the shipwreck being based entirely on rumor and speculation. In January 1687, Phipps found the wreck of the Spanish galleon Nuestra Señora de la Concepción off the coast of Santo Domingo. Some sources say they used an inverted container as a diving bell for the salvage operation while others say the crew was assisted by Indian divers in the shallow waters. The operation lasted from February to April 1687 during which time they salvaged jewels, some gold, and 30 tons of silver which, at the time, was worth over £200,000.

In 1691, Edmond Halley completed plans for a greatly improved diving bell, capable of remaining submerged for extended periods of time, and fitted with a window for the purpose of undersea exploration. The atmosphere was replenished by way of weighted barrels of air sent down from the surface. In a demonstration, Halley and five companions dived to 60 feet (18 m) in the River Thames, and remained there for over an hour and a half. Improvements made to it over time extended his underwater exposure time to over four hours.

In 1775, Charles Spalding, an Edinburgh confectioner, improved on Edmond Halley's design by adding a system of balance-weights to ease the raising and lowering of the bell, along with a series of ropes for signaling to the surface crew. Spalding and his nephew, Ebenezer Watson, later suffocated off the coast of Dublin in 1783 doing salvage work in a diving bell of Spalding's design.

In 1689, Denis Papin had suggested that the pressure and fresh air inside a diving bell could be maintained by a force pump or bellows. His idea was implemented exactly 100 years later by the engineer John Smeaton, who built the first workable diving air pump in 1789.

== Surface-supplied diving equipment ==
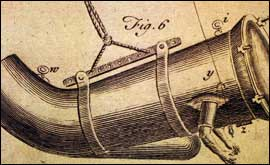
Jacob Rowe diving dress built in the 1710s.

In 1602, the Spanish military engineer Jerónimo de Ayanz y Beaumont developed the first documented diving dress. It was tested the same year in the Pisuerga river (Valladolid, Spain). King Philip the Third attended the demonstration.

In the early 18th century, the Englishman Andrew Becker made a leather-covered diving suit with a windowed helmet. The suit used a system of tubes for inhaling and exhaling, and Becker demonstrated his suit in the River Thames at London, during which he remained submerged for an hour. These suits were of limited use as there was still no practical system for replenishing the air supply during the dive.

=== Open diving dress ===
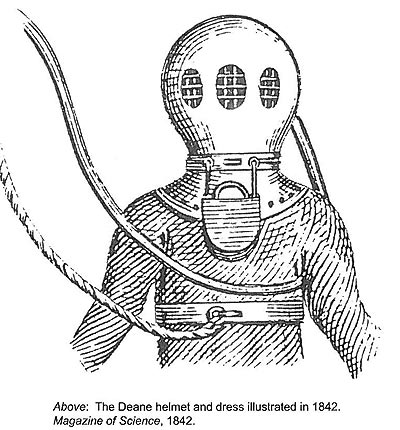
1842 sketch of the Deane brothers' diving helmet

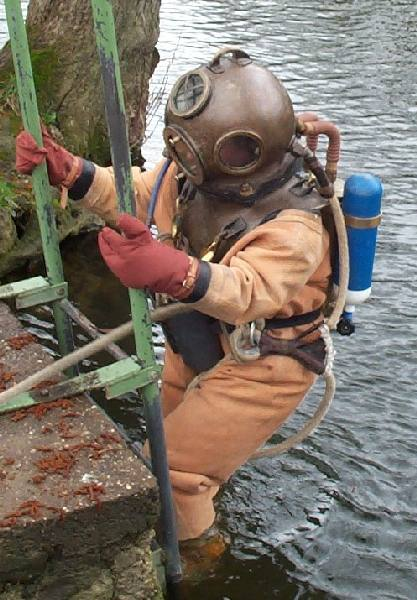
Standard diving dress with Dräger DM-40 semi-closed circuit nitrox rebreather set

In 1405, Konrad Kyeser described a diving dress made of a leather jacket and metal helmet with two glass windows. The jacket and helmet were lined by sponge to "retain the air" and a leather pipe was connected to a bag of air. A diving suit design was illustrated in a book by Vegetius in 1511. Borelli designed diving equipment that consisted of a metal helmet, a pipe to "regenerate" air, a leather suit, and a means of controlling the diver's buoyancy. In 1690, Thames Divers, a short-lived London diving company, gave public demonstrations of a Vegetius type shallow water diving dress. Karl Heinrich Klingert designed a full diving dress in 1797. This design consisted of a large metal helmet and a similarly large metal belt connected by a leather jacket and pants. This apparatus was successfully demonstrated in the river Oder, but was handicapped by not having a reliable air supply system.

In 1800, Peter Kreeft presented his diving apparatus to the Swedish king, and used it successfully.

In 1819, Augustus Siebe invented an open diving suit which only covered the top portion of the body. The suit included a metal helmet which was riveted to a waterproof jacket that ended below the diver's waist. The suit worked like a diving bell—air pumped into the suit escaped at the bottom edge. The diver was extremely limited in range of motion and had to move about in a more or less upright position. It wasn't until 1837 that Siebe changed the design to a closed system with only the hands left out of the suit with air-tight seals around the wrists.

The first widely successful diving helmets were produced by the brothers Charles and John Deane in the 1820s. Inspired by a fire accident he witnessed in a stable in England, he designed and patented a "Smoke Helmet" to be used by firemen in smoke-filled areas in 1823. The apparatus comprised a copper helmet with an attached flexible collar and garment. A long leather hose attached to the rear of the helmet was to be used to supply air – the original concept being that it would be pumped using a double bellows. A short pipe allowed excess air to escape. The garment was constructed from leather or airtight cloth, secured by straps.

The brothers had insufficient funds to build the equipment themselves so they sold the patent to their employer Edward Barnard. It was not until 1827 that the first smoke helmets were built by German-born British engineer Augustus Siebe. In 1828 they decided to find another application for their device and converted it into a diving helmet. They marketed the helmet with a loosely attached "diving suit" so that a diver could perform salvage work but only in a full vertical position, otherwise water entered the suit.

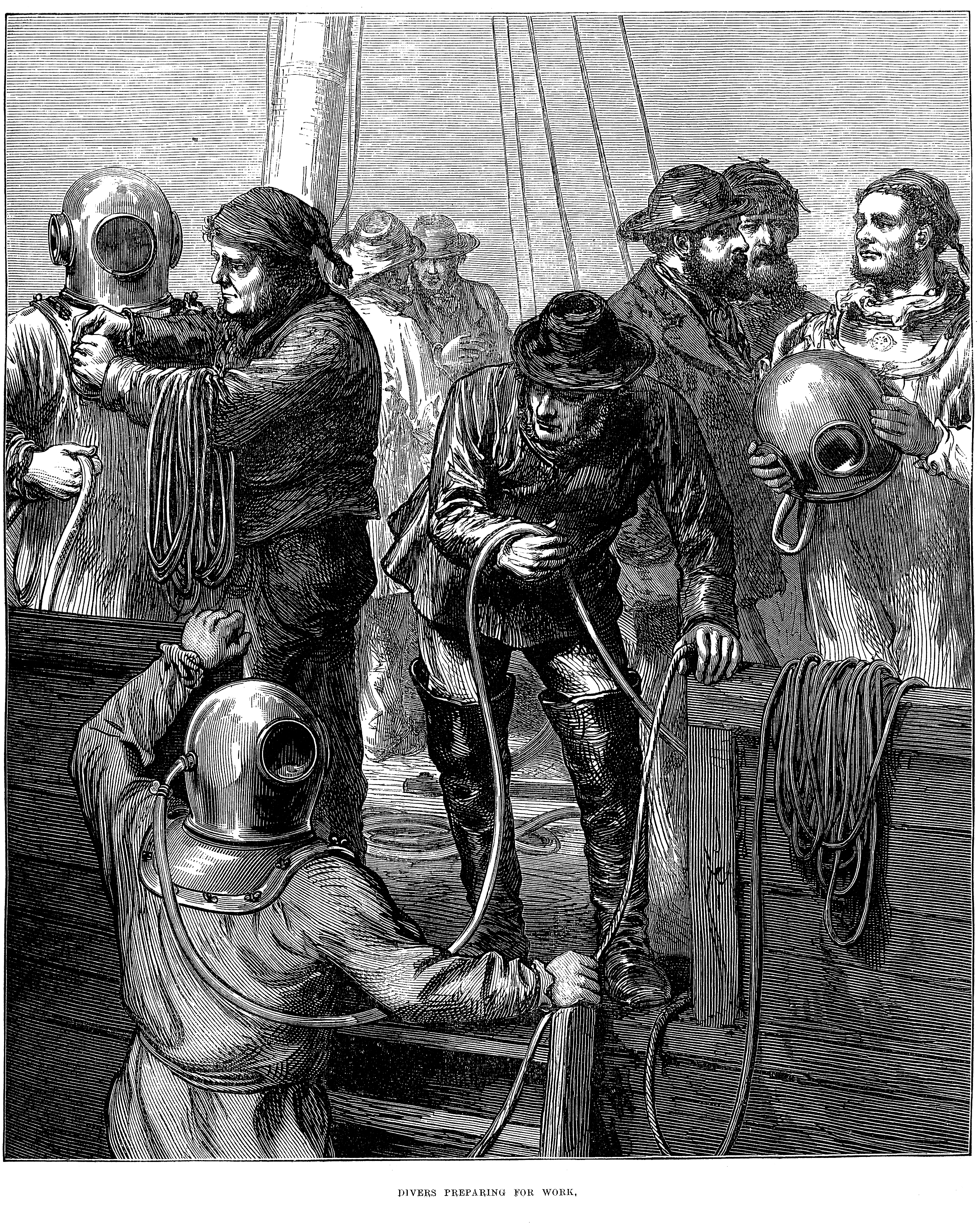
Siebe's improved design in 1873.

In 1829, the Deane brothers sailed from Whitstable for trials of their new underwater apparatus, establishing the diving industry in the town. In 1834, Charles used his diving helmet and suit in a successful attempt on the wreck of HMS Royal George at Spithead, during which he recovered 28 of the ship's cannon. In 1836, John Deane recovered from the Mary Rose shipwreck timbers, guns, longbows, and other items. By 1836, the Deane brothers had produced the world's first diving manual Method of Using Deane's Patent Diving Apparatus which explained in detail the workings of the apparatus and pump, as well as safety precautions.

=== Standard diving dress ===
In the 1830s, the Deane brothers asked Augustus Siebe to improve their underwater helmet design. Expanding on improvements already made by another engineer, George Edwards, Siebe produced his own design; a helmet fitted to a full-length watertight canvas diving suit. Siebe introduced various modifications on his diving dress design to accommodate the requirements of the salvage team on the wreck of Royal George, including making the bonnet of the helmet detachable from the corselet. His improved design gave rise to the typical standard diving dress which revolutionised underwater civil engineering, underwater salvage, commercial diving and naval diving. The watertight suit allowed divers to wear layers of dry clothing underneath to suit the water temperature. These generally included heavy stockings, guernseys, and the iconic woolen cap that is still occasionally worn by divers.

=== Early diving work ===
In the early years of the diving suit, divers were often employed for cleaning and maintenance of seagoing vessels which could require the efforts of multiple divers. Ships that did not have diving suits available would commission diving companies to do underwater maintenance of ships' hulls, as a clean hull would increase the speed of the vessel. The average time spent diving for these purposes was between four and seven hours.

The Office of the Admiralty and Marine Affairs adopted the diving suit in the 1860s. Divers duties included underwater repair of vessels, maintenance, and cleaning of propellers, retrieval of lost anchors and chains, and removing seaweed and other fouling from the hull that could hinder movement.

=== Development of salvage diving operations ===
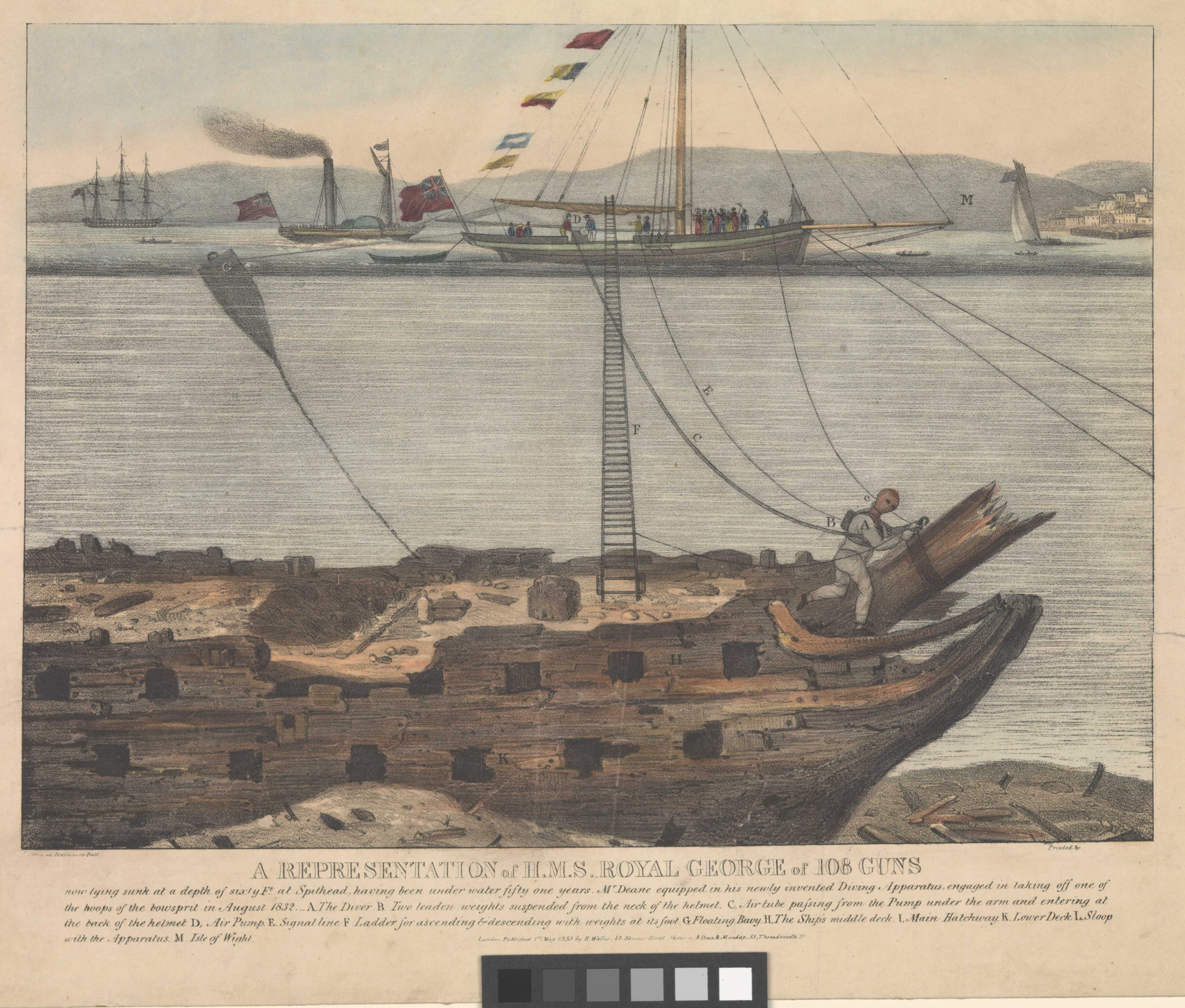
Illustration of Charles Anthony Deane exploring the wreck of HMS Royal George in 1832

HMS Royal George, a 100-gun ship of the line of the Royal Navy, sank undergoing routine maintenance work in 1782. Charles Spalding used a diving bell to recover six iron 12-pounder guns and nine brass 12-pounders in the same year. In 1839, Major-General Charles Pasley, at the time a colonel of the Royal Engineers, commenced operations. He had previously destroyed some old wrecks in the Thames and intended to break up Royal George with gunpowder charges and then salvage as much as possible using divers. The Deane brothers were commissioned to perform salvage work on the wreck. Using their new air-pumped diving helmets, they managed to recover about two dozen cannon.

Pasley's diving salvage operation set many diving milestones, including the first recorded use of the buddy system in diving, when he gave instructions to his divers to operate in pairs. In addition, the first emergency swimming ascent was made by a diver after his air line became tangled and he had to cut it free. A less fortunate milestone was the first medical account of a diving barotrauma. The early diving helmets had no non-return valves, so if a hose was severed near the surface, the ambient pressure air around the diver's head rapidly drained from the helmet to the lower pressure at the break, leaving a pressure difference between the inside and outside of the helmet that could cause injurious and sometimes life-threatening effects. At the British Association for the Advancement of Science meeting in 1842, Sir John Richardson described the diving apparatus and treatment of diver Roderick Cameron following an injury that occurred on 14 October 1841 during the salvage operations.

Pasley recovered 12 more guns in 1839, 11 more in 1840, and 6 in 1841. In 1842 he recovered only one iron 12-pounder because he ordered the divers to concentrate on removing the hull timbers rather than search for guns. Other items recovered, in 1840, included the surgeon's brass instruments, silk garments of satin weave "of which the silk was perfect", and pieces of leather; but no woolen clothing. By 1843 the whole of the keel and the bottom timbers had been raised and the site was declared clear.

=== British underwater intelligence operation during World War I ===
During World War I, the Royal Navy conducted intelligence operation targeting sunken German submarines. Pioneered by an elite group of divers colloquially known as the "Tin Openers" (attached to the Admiralty Salvage Section), these operations provided Room 40 (Britain's naval cryptographic department) with the codebooks needed to decipher German naval wireless traffic.

=== Gas extenders ===
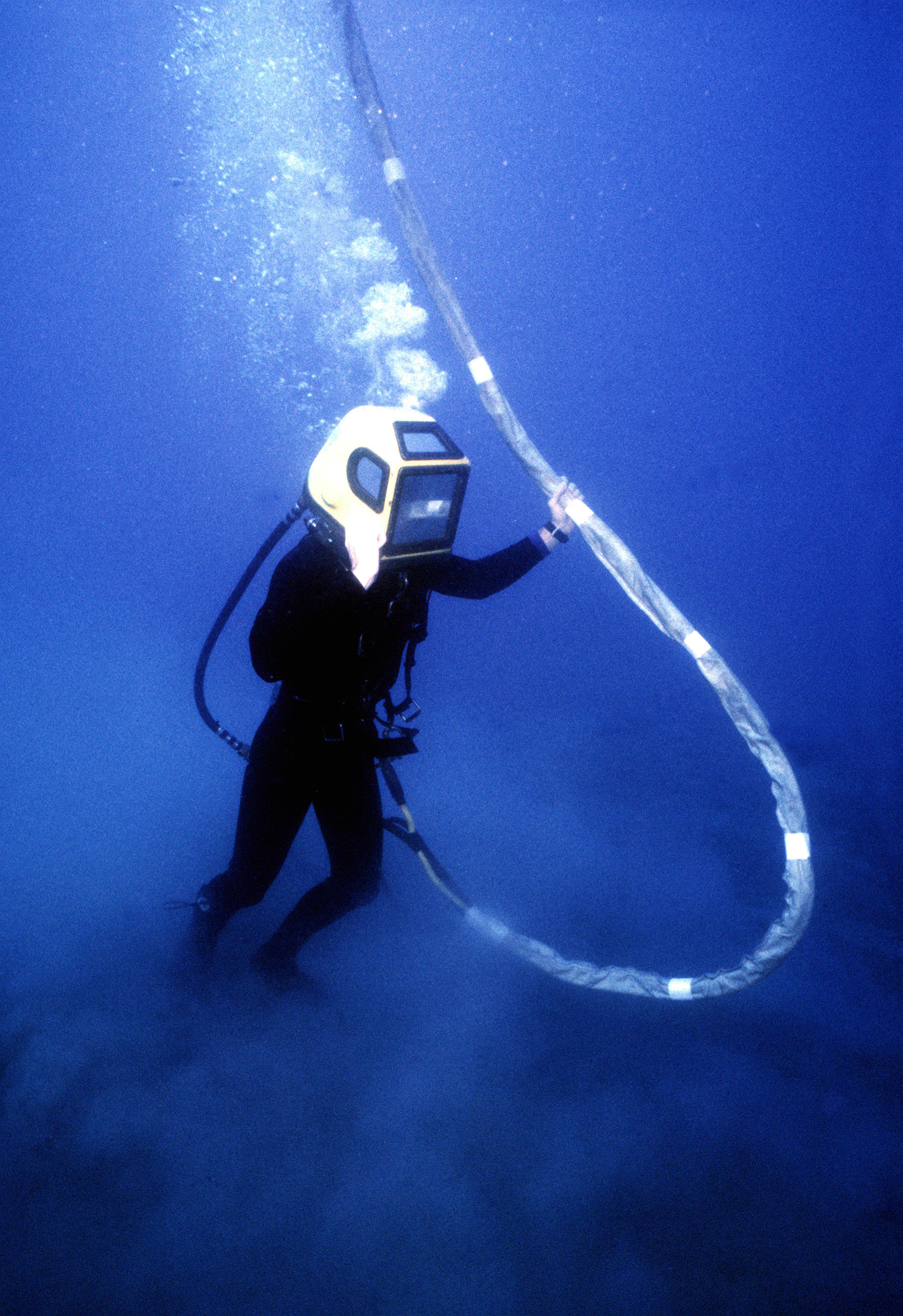
Mark 12 diving gear in use during a training exercise

The US Navy developed a variant of the Mark V system for heliox diving. These were successfully used during the rescue of the crew and salvage of the USS Squalus in 1939. The US Navy Mark V Mod 1 heliox mixed gas helmet is based on the standard Mark V Helmet, with a scrubber canister mounted on the back of the helmet and an inlet gas injection system which recirculates the breathing gas through the scrubber to remove carbon dioxide and thereby conserve helium.

The US Navy replaced the Mark V helmet in 1980 with the Morse Engineering Mark 12 deep water helmet which has a fibreglass shell with a distinctive large rectangular front faceplate for a better field of vision for work. It also has side and top viewports for peripheral vision. This helmet can also be used for mixed gas either for open circuit or as part of a modular semi-closed circuit system, which uses a back mounted recirculating scrubber unit connected to the lower back of the helmet by flexible breathing hoses. The helmet uses a neck dam or can be connected directly to a dry suit, and uses a jocking harness to keep the helmet in position, but is ballasted to provide neutral buoyancy and a centre of gravity at the centre of buoyancy for stability. Airflow is directed over the faceplate to prevent fogging. Both the Mk V and the Mk 12 were in use in 1981. The Mk 12 was phased out in 1993.

=== Lightweight demand helmets ===
The application of the neck dam concept, a development of the dry suit neck seal, to the diving helmet by Joe Savoie in 1964, allowed the helmet to turn with the diver's head, so it could be made a much closer fit. This allowed the helmet to be made much smaller and lighter. Savoie made several helmets based on motorcycle crash helmets, starting with free-flow versions, then adapting them to use demand valves. The Kirby-Morgan band mask was adapted to use a glass-fibre reinforced resin helmet and a neck dam with a yoke fitting to counteract forces which might otherwise lift it from the diver's head, to become the KMB17 Superlite range, one of the most common lightweight demand helmets in the industry. The neck dam has become an industry standard in lightweight diving helmets.

== Self-contained air supply equipment ==
A drawback to the equipment pioneered by Deane and Siebe was the requirement for a constant supply of air pumped from the surface. This restricted the movements and range of the diver and was also potentially hazardous as the supply could get cut off for a number of reasons. Early attempts at creating systems that would allow divers to carry a portable breathing gas source did not succeed, as the compression and storage technology was not advanced enough to allow compressed air to be stored in containers at sufficiently high pressures. By the end of the nineteenth century, two basic templates for scuba, (self-contained underwater breathing apparatus), had emerged: open-circuit scuba where the diver's exhaust is vented directly into the water, and closed-circuit scuba where the diver's unused oxygen is filtered from the carbon dioxide and recirculated. A scuba set is characterized by full independence from the surface during use, by providing breathing gas carried by the diver. Early attempts to reach this autonomy from the surface were made in the 18th century by the Englishman John Lethbridge, who invented and successfully built his own underwater diving machine in 1715. The air inside the suit allowed a short period of diving before it had to be surfaced for replenishment.

=== Standard diving dress rebreathers ===
In 1912 the German firm Drägerwerk of Lübeck introduced a version of standard diving dress using a gas supply from an oxygen rebreather and no surface supply. The system used a copper diving helmet and standard heavy diving suit with a back-mounted set of cylinders and scrubber. The breathing gas was circulated by using an injector system in the loop powered by the added gas. This was developed further with the Modell 1915 "Bubikopf" helmet and the DM20 oxygen rebreather system for depths up to 20 m, and the DM40 mixed gas rebreather which used an oxygen cylinder and an air cylinder for the gas supply, producing a nitrox mixture, for depths up to 40 m.

These systems were semi-closed and did not monitor partial pressures of oxygen. They used an injector system to recirculate the breathing gas and did not increase work of breathing.

=== Open-circuit scuba ===
None of those inventions solved the problem of high pressure when compressed air must be supplied to the diver (as in modern regulators); they were mostly based on a constant-flow supply of the air. The compression and storage technology was not advanced enough to allow compressed air to be stored in containers at sufficiently high pressures to allow useful dive times.

An early diving dress using a compressed air reservoir was designed and built in 1771 by Sieur Fréminet of Paris who conceived an autonomous breathing machine equipped with a reservoir, dragged behind the diver or mounted on his back. Fréminet called his invention machine hydrostatergatique and used it successfully for more than ten years in the harbors of Le Havre and Brest, as stated in the explanatory text of a 1784 painting.

The Frenchman Paul Lemaire d'Augerville built and used autonomous diving equipment in 1824, as did the British William H. James in 1825. James' helmet was made of "thin copper or sole of leather" with a plate window, and the air was supplied from an iron reservoir. A similar system was used in 1831 by the American Charles Condert, who died in 1832 while testing his invention in the East River at only 20 feet (6 m) deep. After having traveled to England and discovering William James' invention, the French physician Manuel Théodore Guillaumet, from Argentan (in Normandy), patented the oldest known regulator mechanism in 1838. Guillaumet's invention was supplied with air from the surface and was never mass-produced due to problems with safety.

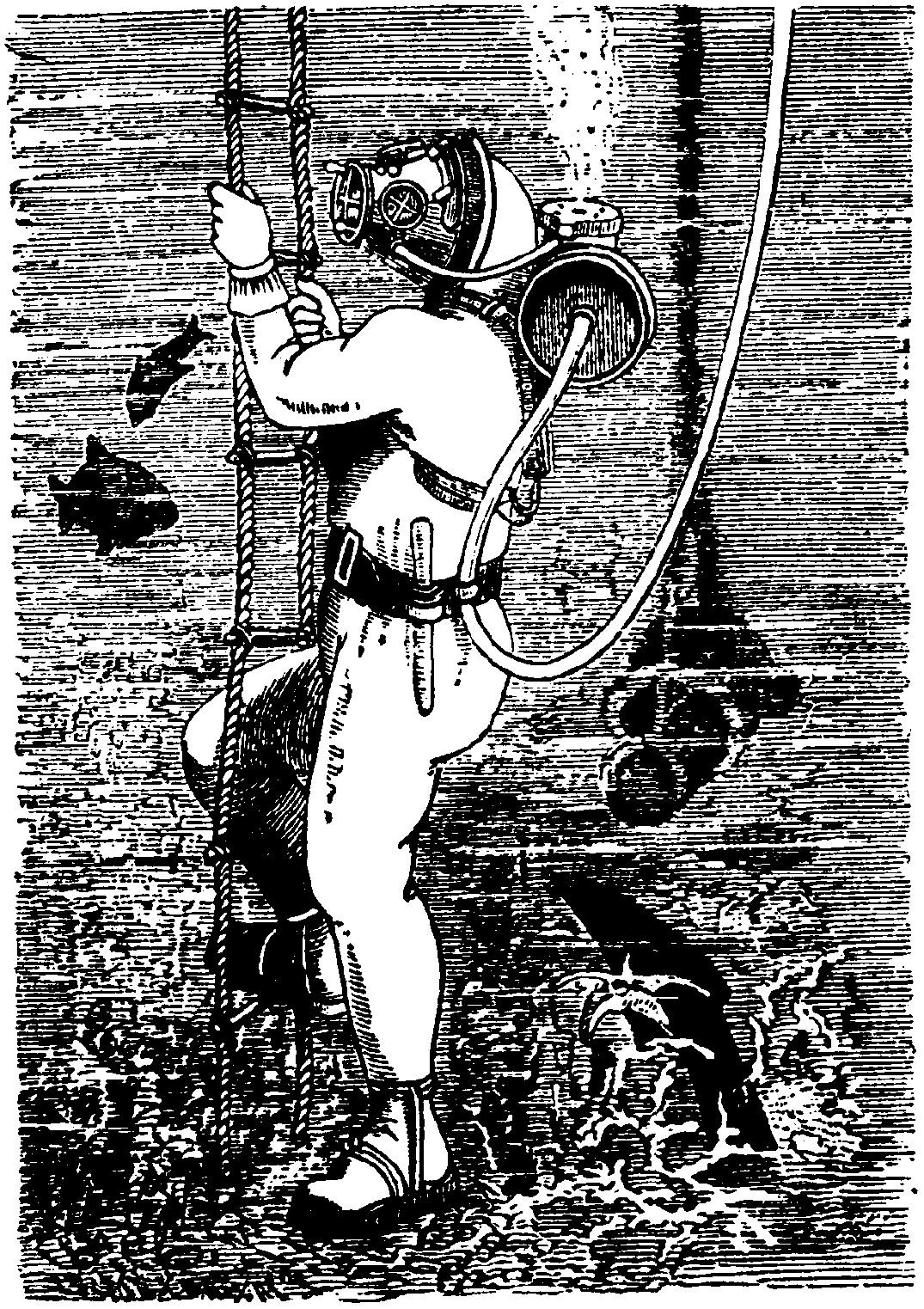
The Rouquayrol-Denayrouze apparatus was the first regulator to be mass-produced (from 1865 to 1965). In this picture the air reservoir presents its surface-supplied configuration.

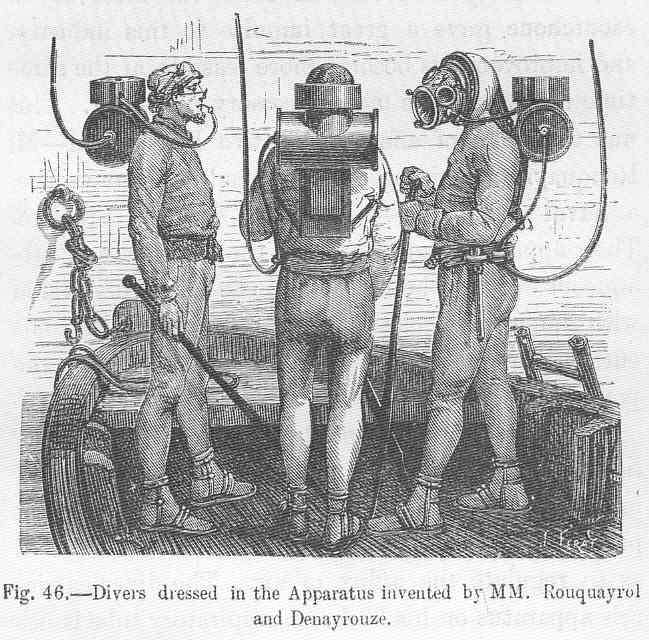
Divers dressed in the Apparatus Invented by MM Rouquayrol and Denayrouze

An important step in the development of open-circuit scuba technology was the invention of the demand regulator in 1864 by the French engineers Auguste Denayrouze and Benoît Rouquayrol. Their suit was the first to supply air to the user by adjusting the flow according to the diver's requirements. The system still had to use surface supply, as the storage cylinders of the 1860s were not able to withstand the high pressures necessary for a practical self-contained unit.

The first open-circuit scuba system was devised in 1925 by Yves Le Prieur in France. Inspired by the simple apparatus of Maurice Fernez and the freedom it allowed the diver, he conceived an idea to make it free of the tube to the surface pump by using Michelin cylinders as the air supply, containing three litres (0.66 imp gal; 0.79 US gal) of air compressed to 150 kilograms per square centimetre (2,100 psi; 150 bar). The "Fernez-Le Prieur" diving apparatus was demonstrated at the swimming pool of Tourelles in Paris in 1926. The unit consisted of a cylinder of compressed air carried on the back of the diver, connected to a pressure regulator designed by Le Prieur adjusted manually by the diver, with two gauges, one for tank pressure and one for output (supply) pressure. Air was supplied continuously to the mouthpiece and ejected through a short exhaust pipe fitted with a valve as in the Fernez design, however, the lack of a demand regulator and the consequent low endurance of the apparatus limited the practical use of Le Prieur's device.

Le Prieur's design was the first autonomous breathing device used by the first scuba diving clubs in history - Racleurs de fond founded by Glenn Orr in California in 1933, and Club des sous-l'eau founded by Le Prieur himself in Paris in 1935. Fernez had previously invented the noseclip, a mouthpiece (equipped with a one-way valve for exhalation) and diving goggles, and Yves le Prieur just joined to those three Fernez elements a hand-controlled regulator and a compressed-air cylinder. Fernez's goggles didn't allow a dive deeper than ten metres (33 ft) due to "mask squeeze", so, in 1933, Le Prieur replaced all the Fernez equipment (goggles, nose clip, and valve) by a full face mask, directly supplied with constant flow air from the cylinder.

In 1942, during the German occupation of France, Jacques-Yves Cousteau and Émile Gagnan designed the first successful and safe open-circuit scuba, known as the Aqua-Lung. Their system combined an improved demand regulator with high-pressure air tanks. Émile Gagnan, an engineer employed by the Air Liquide company, miniaturized and adapted the regulator to use with gas generators, in response to constant fuel shortage that was a consequence of German requisitioning. Gagnan's boss, Henri Melchior, knew that his son-in-law Jacques-Yves Cousteau was looking for an automatic demand regulator to increase the useful period of the underwater breathing apparatus invented by Commander le Prieur, so he introduced Cousteau to Gagnan in December 1942. On Cousteau's initiative, the Gagnan's regulator was adapted to diving, and the new Cousteau-Gagnan patent was registered some weeks later in 1943.

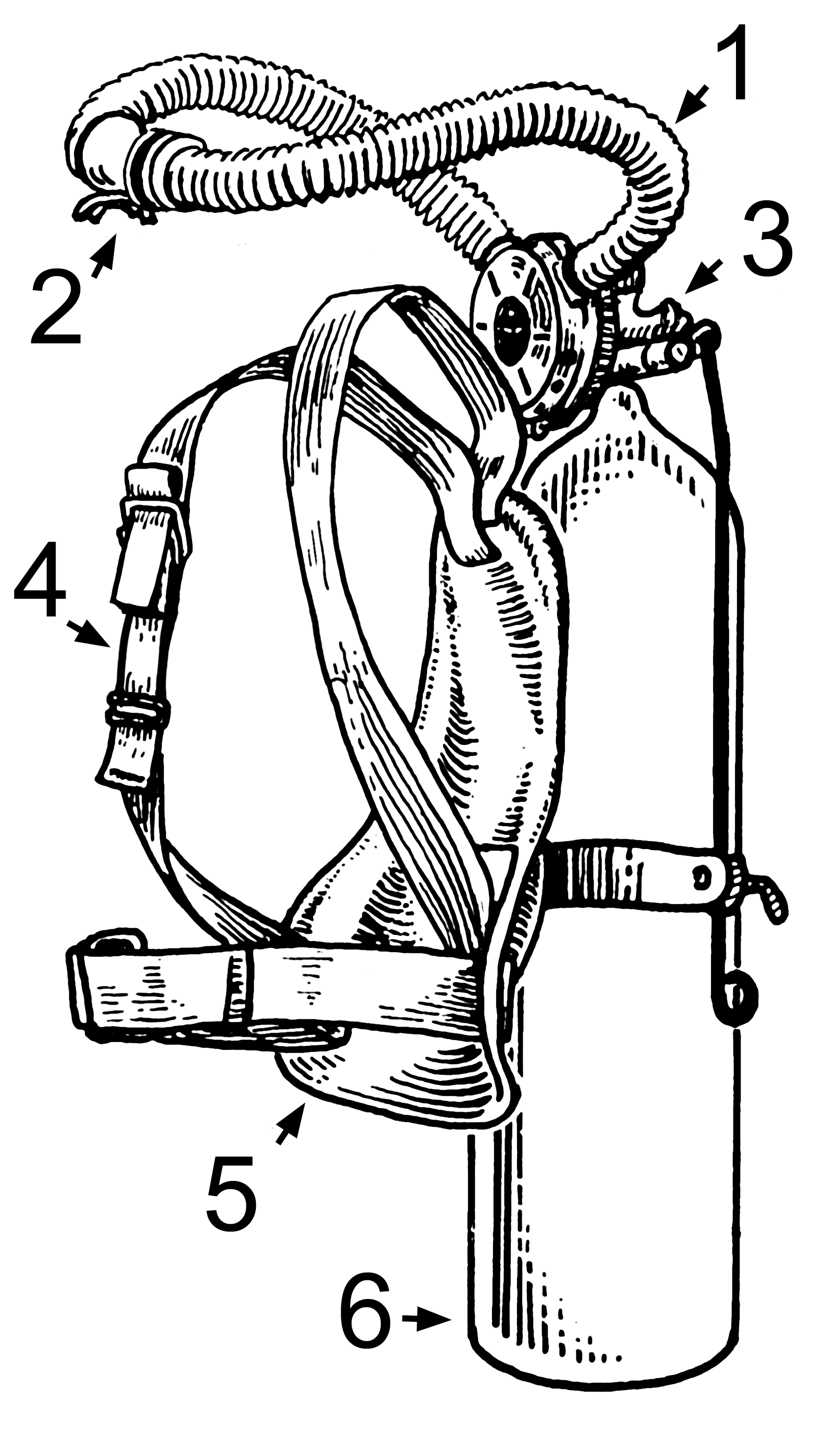
Mistral twin-hose regulator mounted on a diving cylinder. The regulator is formed by the ensemble of the mouthpiece and the regulator body, joined on each of its sides by the two hoses. The rear of the regulator is connected to the high-pressure valve of the cylinder.: 1. Hose; 2. Mouthpiece; 3. Valve; 4. Harness; 5. Backplate; 6. Cylinder

Air Liquide started selling the Cousteau-Gagnan regulator commercially as of 1946 under the name of scaphandre Cousteau-Gagnan or CG45 ("C" for Cousteau, "G" for Gagnan and 45 for the 1945 patent). The same year Air Liquide created a division called La Spirotechnique, to develop and sell regulators and other diving equipment. To sell his regulator in English-speaking countries Cousteau registered the Aqua-Lung trademark, which was first licensed to the U.S. Divers company (the American division of Air Liquide) and later sold with La Spirotechnique and U.S. Divers to finally become the name of the company, Aqua-Lung/La Spirotechnique, currently located in Carros, near Nice.

In 1948 the Cousteau-Gagnan patent was also licensed to Siebe Gorman of England, when Siebe Gorman was directed by Robert Henry Davis. Siebe Gorman was allowed to sell in Commonwealth countries but had difficulty in meeting the demand and the U.S. patent prevented others from making the product. This demand was eventually met by Ted Eldred of Melbourne, Australia, who had been developing a rebreather called the Porpoise. When a demonstration resulted in a diver passing out, he began to develop the single-hose open-circuit scuba system, which separates the first and second stages by a low-pressure hose, and releases exhaled gas at the second stage. This avoided the Cousteau-Gagnan patent, which protected the twin-hose scuba regulator. In the process, Eldred also improved the performance of the regulator. Eldred sold the first Porpoise Model CA single hose scuba early in 1952.

In 1957, Eduard Admetlla i Lázaro used a version made by Nemrod to descend to a record depth of 100 metres (330 ft).

Early scuba sets were usually provided with a plain harness of shoulder straps and waist belt. The waist belt buckles were usually quick-release, and shoulder straps sometimes had adjustable or quick-release buckles. Many harnesses did not have a backplate, and the cylinders rested directly against the diver's back. The harnesses of many diving rebreathers made by Siebe Gorman included a large back-sheet of reinforced rubber.

Early scuba divers dived without any buoyancy aid. In an emergency, they had to jettison their weights. In the 1960s, adjustable buoyancy life jackets (ABLJ) became available. One early make, since 1961, was Fenzy. The ABLJ is used for two purposes: to adjust the buoyancy of the diver to compensate for loss of buoyancy at depth, mainly due to compression of the neoprene wetsuit) and more importantly as a lifejacket that will hold an unconscious diver face-upwards at the surface, and that can be quickly inflated. It was put on before putting on the cylinder harness. The first versions were inflated with a small carbon dioxide cylinder, later with a small direct coupled air cylinder. An extra low-pressure feed from the regulator first-stage lets the lifejacket be controlled as a buoyancy aid. This invention in 1971 of the "direct system," by ScubaPro, resulted in what was called a stabilizer jacket or stab jacket, and is now increasingly known as a buoyancy compensator (device), or simply "BCD".

=== Closed-circuit scuba ===
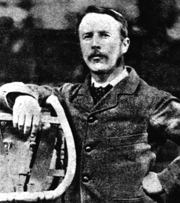
Henry Fleuss (1851-1932) improved the technology of the closed-circuit oxygen rebreather .

The alternative concept, developed in roughly the same time frame was closed-circuit scuba. The body consumes and metabolises only a part of the oxygen in the inhaled air at the surface, and an even smaller fraction when the breathing gas is compressed as it is in ambient pressure systems underwater. A rebreather recycles the used breathing gas, while constantly replenishing it from the supply so that the oxygen level does not get dangerously depleted. The apparatus also has to remove the exhaled carbon dioxide, as a buildup of CO_{2} levels would result in respiratory distress due to hypercapnia.

The earliest known oxygen rebreather was patented on 17 June 1808 by Sieur Touboulic from Brest, mechanic in Napoleon's Imperial Navy, but there is no evidence of any prototype having been manufactured. This early rebreather design worked with an oxygen reservoir, the oxygen being delivered progressively by the diver himself and circulating in a closed circuit through a sponge soaked in limewater. The earliest practical rebreather relates to the 1849 patent from the Frenchman Pierre Aimable De Saint Simon Sicard.

The first commercially practical closed-circuit scuba was designed and built by the diving engineer Henry Fleuss in 1878, while working for Siebe Gorman in London. His apparatus consisted of a rubber mask connected by a tube to a bag, with (estimated) 50–60% O_{2} supplied from a copper pressure tank and CO_{2} chemically absorbed by rope yarn in the bag soaked in a solution of caustic potash. The system allowed use for about three hours. Fleuss tested his device in 1879 by spending an hour submerged in a water tank, then one week later by diving to a depth of 5.5 metres (18 ft) in open water, upon which occasion he was slightly injured when his assistants abruptly pulled him to the surface. The Fleuss apparatus was first used under operational conditions in 1880 by the lead diver on the Severn Tunnel construction project Alexander Lambert, who was able to travel 1,000 feet (300 m) in the darkness to close several submerged sluice doors in the tunnel; this had defeated the best efforts of hard hat divers due to the danger of their air supply hoses becoming fouled on submerged debris, and the strong water currents in the workings. Fleuss continually improved his apparatus, adding a demand regulator and tanks capable of holding greater amounts of oxygen at higher pressure.

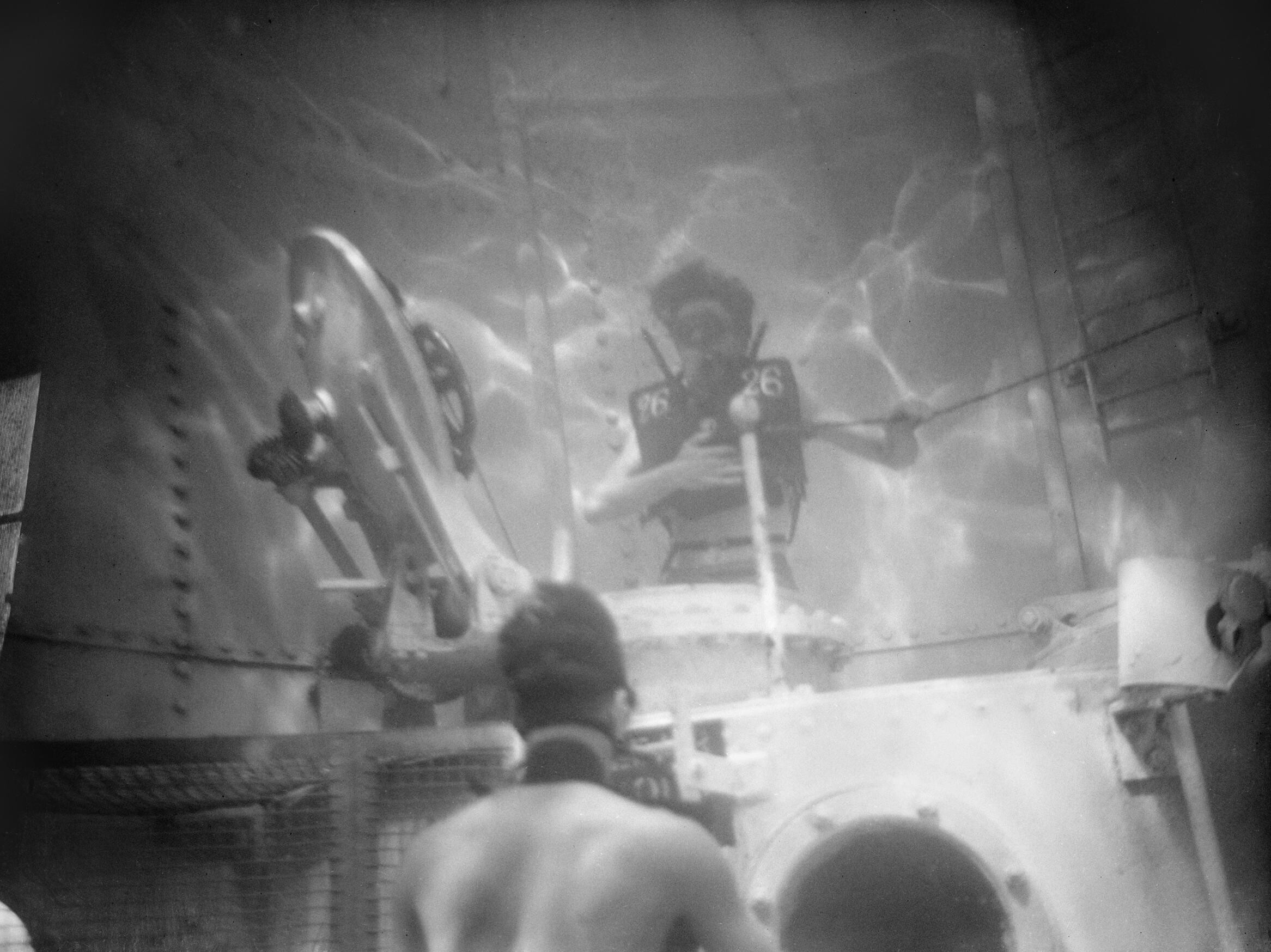
Davis Submerged Escape Apparatus being tested at the submarine escape test tank at HMS Dolphin, Gosport, 14 December 1942.

Sir Robert Davis, head of Siebe Gorman, improved the oxygen rebreather in 1910 with his invention of the Davis Submerged Escape Apparatus, the first rebreather to be made in quantity. While intended primarily as an emergency escape apparatus for submarine crews, it was soon also used for diving, being a handy shallow water diving apparatus with a thirty-minute endurance, and as an industrial breathing set. The Davis apparatus comprised a rubber breathing bag containing a canister of barium hydroxide to scrub exhaled carbon dioxide and a steel cylinder holding approximately 56 litres (2.0 cu ft) of oxygen at a pressure of 120 bars (1,700 psi), with a valve to allow the user to add oxygen to the bag. The set also included an emergency buoyancy bag on the front of to help keep the wearer afloat. The DSEA was adopted by the Royal Navy after further development by Davis in 1927.

The rig comprised a rubber breathing/buoyancy bag containing a canister of barium hydroxide to scrub exhaled CO_{2} and, in a pocket at the lower end of the bag, a steel pressure cylinder holding approximately 56 litres (2.0 cu ft) of oxygen at a pressure of 120 bars (1,700 psi). The cylinder was equipped with a control valve and was connected to the breathing bag. Opening the cylinder's valve admitted oxygen to the bag at ambient pressure. The rig also included an emergency buoyancy bag on the front to help keep the wearer afloat. The DSEA was adopted by the Royal Navy after further development by Davis in 1927.

In 1912, the German firm Drägerwerk of Lübeck introduced their own version of standard diving dress using a gas supply from an injector-circulated oxygen rebreather and no surface supply.

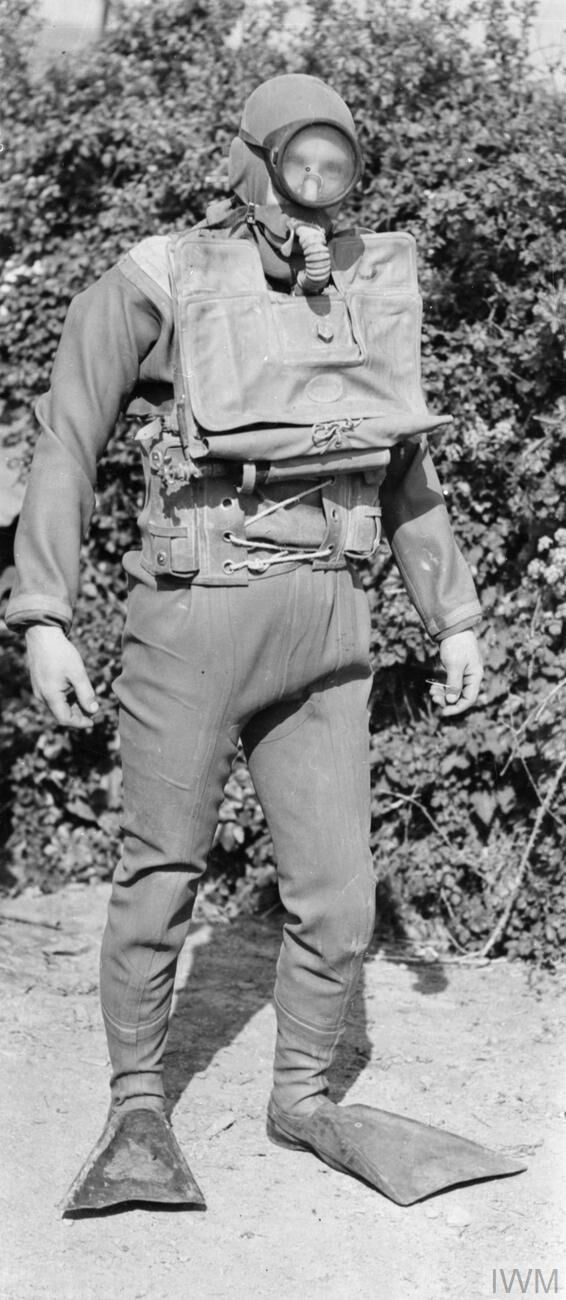
A 1945 British navy frogman with Davis apparatus.

In the 1930s, Italian sport spearfishers began to use the Davis rebreather. Italian manufacturers received a license from the English patent holders to produce it. This practice soon came to the attention of the Italian Navy, The Italians developed similar rebreathers for the combat swimmers of the Decima Flottiglia MAS, especially the Pirelli ARO which was used effectively in World War II. During the 1930s and all through World War II, the British, Italians and Germans developed and extensively used oxygen rebreathers to equip the first frogmen. The British used the Davis apparatus for submarine escape, but they soon adapted it for their frogmen during World War II. Germans used the Dräger rebreathers, which were also originally designed as submarine escape sets and only adapted for use by frogmen during World War II. During the Second World War, captured Italian frogmen's rebreathers influenced improved designs for British rebreathers. Some British armed forces divers used bulky thick diving suits called Sladen suits, one version of which had a flip-up faceplate to let the diver use binoculars when on the surface.

In 1939, Christian Lambertsen developed an oxygen rebreather he called the Lambertsen Amphibious Respirator Unit (LARU) and patented it in 1940. He later renamed it the Self Contained Underwater Breathing Apparatus, which, contracted to SCUBA, eventually became the generic term for both open circuit and rebreather autonomous underwater breathing equipment. Lambertson demonstrated the apparatus to the Office of Strategic Services (OSS) who hired him to lead the program to build up the dive element of their maritime unit. After World War II, military frogmen continued to use rebreathers since they do not make bubbles which would give away the presence of the divers.

Lambertsen later suggests that breathing gas mixtures of nitrogen or helium with oxygen greater than in air could be used in scuba to increase the depth range beyond that possible using pure oxygen rebreathers, at the same time reducing the requirement for decompression. In the early 1950s, Lambertsen developed a semiclosed-circuit scuba called the FLATUS I, which continuously added a small flow of oxygen-rich mixed gas to a rebreather circuit. The flow of fresh gas replenished the oxygen depleted by metabolic consumption, and exhaled carbon dioxide was removed in an absorbent canister. The added inert gas was not consumed by the diver, so this amount of gas mixture was exhausted from the breathing loop to maintain a constant volume and an approximately constant mixture in the loop.

== Saturation diving ==
Once saturation is achieved, the amount of time needed for decompression depends on the depth and gases breathed and is not affected by longer exposure. The first intentional saturation dive was done on 22 December 1938, by Edgar End and Max Nohl who spent 27 hours breathing air at 101 feet (30.8 m) in the County Emergency Hospital recompression facility in Milwaukee, Wisconsin. Their decompression lasted five hours leaving Nohl with a mild case of decompression sickness that resolved with recompression.

Albert R. Behnke proposed exposing divers to raised ambient pressures long enough for the tissues to saturate with inert gases in 1942. In 1957, George F. Bond began the Genesis project at the Naval Submarine Medical Research Laboratory proving that humans could withstand prolonged exposure to different breathing gases and increased environmental pressures. This was the beginning of saturation diving and the United States Navy's Man-in-the-Sea Program.

The first commercial saturation dives were performed in 1965 by Westinghouse to replace faulty trash racks at 200 feet (61 m) on the Smith Mountain Dam.

Peter B. Bennett is credited with the invention of trimix breathing gas as a method to eliminate high pressure nervous syndrome. In 1981, at the Duke University Medical Center, Bennett conducted an experiment called Atlantis III, which involved taking divers to a depth of 2,250 feet (690 m), and slowly decompressing them to the surface over a period of 31-plus days, setting an early world record for depth in the process.

After a pioneering period of offshore commercial saturation diving in the oil and gas production industry, in which a number of fatal accidents occurred, the technology and procedures of saturation diving have matured to the point where accidents are rare, and fatal accidents very rare. This has been the result of systematic investigation of accidents, analysis of the causes, and applying the results to improving the risks, often at considerable expense, by improving both procedures and equipment to remove single points of failure and opportunities for user error. The improvements in safety have been driven in part by national health and safety legislation, but also to a large extent have been industry driven through membership of organisations like IMCA.

== Atmospheric diving suits ==
The atmospheric diving suit is a small one-man submersible of anthropomorphic form with elaborate pressure joints to allow articulation while maintaining an internal pressure of one atmosphere. Although atmospheric suits were developed during the Victorian era, none of these suits were able to overcome the basic design problem of constructing a joint that would remain flexible and watertight at depth without seizing up under pressure.

=== Early designs ===
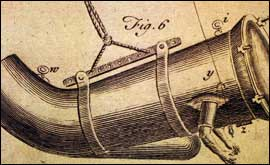
Jacob Rowe's diving engine, built in the 1710s.

Two English inventors developed diving suits in the early 18th century. In 1715, John Lethbridge constructed an enclosed "diving engine" to use in savage work. Essentially a pressure resistant air-filled wooden barrel about 6 feet (1.8 m) in length with two holes for the diver's arms sealed with leather cuffs, and a 4-inch (100 mm) viewport of thick glass. This suit was not surface supplied. Air was sealed in with the diver at the surface before the dive, and lasted up to half an hour at a push. After testing this machine in his garden pond specially built for the purpose, Lethbridge dived on a number of wrecks. It was reportedly used to dive as deep as 60 feet (18 m), and was used to salvage substantial quantities of silver from the wreck of the East Indiaman Vansittart which sank in 1718 off the Cape Verde islands. A similar suit made of copper, with a curved profile, was made by Jacob Rowe who also worked on the Vansittart.

Lethbridge became fairly wealthy as a result of his salvages. One of his better-known recoveries was on the Dutch Slot ter Hooge, which had sunk off Madeira with over three tons of silver on board. Lethbridge salvaged several Dutch East Indiamen under contract to the VOC, some at the Cape of Good Hope. Jacob Rowe moved north and worked on wrecks off the north coast of Scotland "Vansittart".

The first armored suit with real joints, designed as leather pieces with rings in the shape of a spring (also known as accordion joints), was designed by Englishman W. H. Taylor in 1838. The diver's hands and feet were covered with leather. Taylor also devised a ballast tank attached to the suit that could be filled with water to attain negative buoyancy. While it was patented, the suit was never actually produced. It is considered that its weight and bulk would have rendered it nearly immobile underwater.

Lodner D. Phillips designed the first wholly enclosed ADS in 1856. His design comprised a barrel-shaped upper torso with domed ends and included ball and socket joints in the articulated arms and legs. The arms had joints at shoulder and elbow, and the legs at knee and hip. The suit included a ballast tank, a viewing port, an entrance through a manhole cover on top, a hand-cranked propeller, and rudimentary manipulators at the ends of the arms. Air was to be supplied from the surface via a hose. There is no indication, however, Phillips' suit was ever constructed.

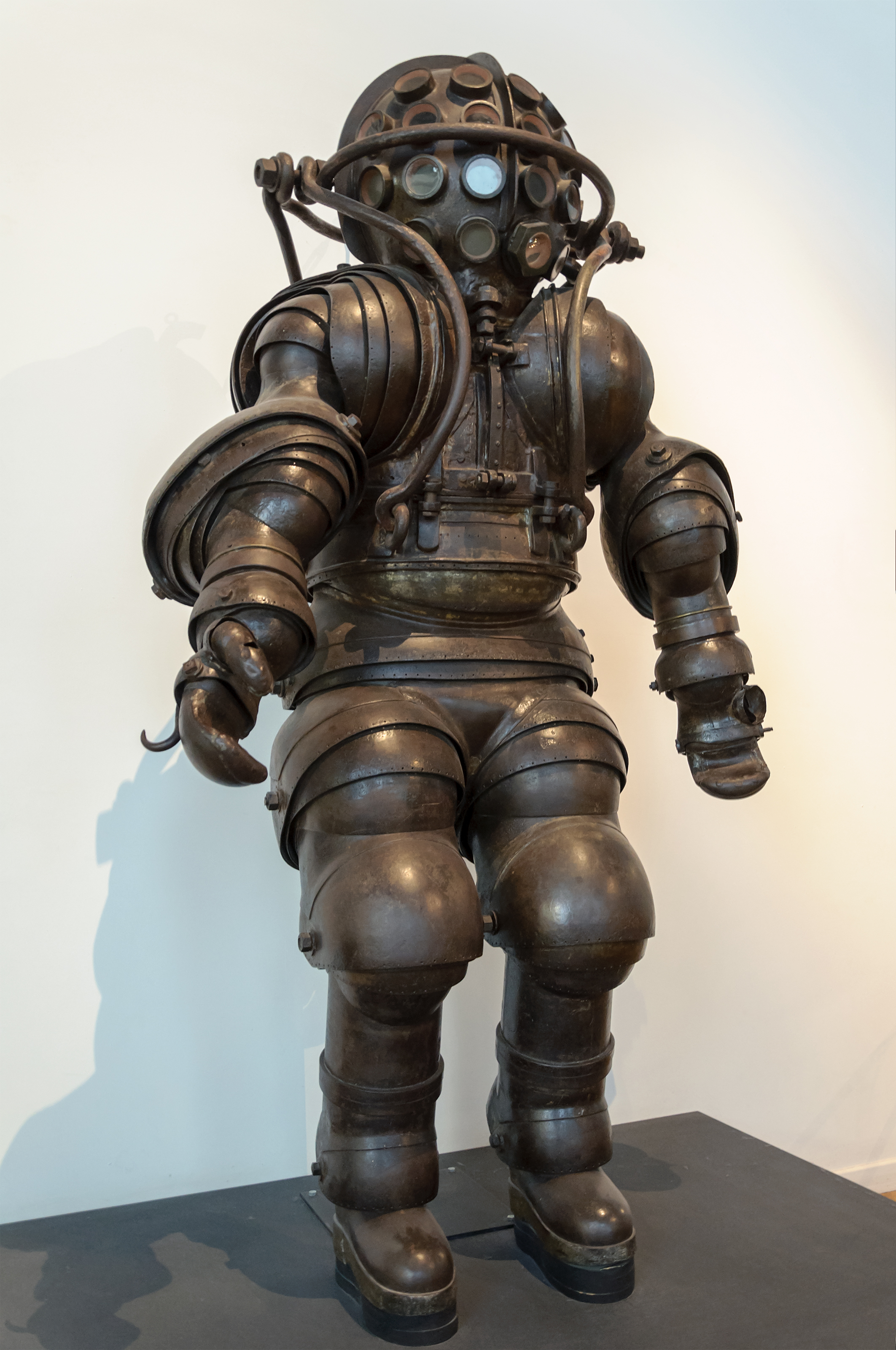
ADS, built by Carmagnolle brothers in 1882, was the first anthropomorphic design.

The first properly anthropomorphic design of ADS, built by the Carmagnolle brothers of Marseille, France in 1882, featured rolling convolute joints consisting of partial sections of concentric spheres formed to create a close fit and kept watertight with a waterproof cloth. The suit had 22 of these joints: four in each leg, six per arm, and two in the body of the suit. The helmet possessed 25 individual 2-inch (50 mm) glass viewing ports spaced at the average distance of the human eyes. Weighing 830 pounds (380 kg), the Carmagnole ADS never worked properly and its joints never were entirely waterproof. It is now on display at the French National Navy Museum in Paris.

Another design was patented in 1894 by inventors John Buchanan and Alexander Gordon from Melbourne], Australia. The construction was based on a frame of spiral wires covered with waterproof material. The design was improved by Alexander Gordon by attaching the suit to the helmet and other parts and incorporating jointed radius rods in the limbs. This resulted in a flexible suit that could withstand high pressure. The suit was manufactured by British firm Siebe Gorman and trialed in Scotland in 1898.

American designer MacDuffy constructed the first suit to use ball bearings to provide joint movement in 1914; it was tested in New York to a depth of 214 feet (65 m), but was not very successful. A year later, Harry L. Bowdoin of Bayonne, New Jersey, made an improved ADS with oil-filled rotary joints. The joints use a small duct to the interior of the joint to allow equalization of pressure. The suit was designed to have four joints in each arm and leg, and one joint in each thumb, for a total of eighteen. Four viewing ports and a chest-mounted lamp were intended to assist underwater vision. Unfortunately, there is no evidence that Bowdoin's suit was ever built or that it would have worked if it had been.

Atmospheric diving suits built by German firm Neufeldt and Kuhnke were used during the salvage of gold and silver bullion from the wreck of the British ship SS Egypt, an 8,000-ton P&O liner that sank in May 1922. The suit was relegated to duties as an observation chamber at the wreck's depth, and was successfully used to direct mechanical grabs which opened up the bullion storage. In 1917, Benjamin F. Leavitt of Traverse City, Michigan, dived on SS Pewabic which sank to a depth of 182 feet (55 m) in Lake Huron in 1865, salvaging 350 tons of copper ore. In 1923, he went on to salvage the wreck of the British schooner Cape Horn which lay in 220 feet (67 m) of water off Pichidangui, Chile, salvaging $600,000 worth of copper. Leavitt's suit was of his own design and construction. The most innovative aspect of Leavitt's suit was that it was completely self-contained and needed no umbilical, the breathing mixture being supplied from a tank mounted on the back of the suit. The breathing apparatus incorporated a scrubber and an oxygen regulator and could last for up to a full hour.

In 1924, the Reichsmarine tested the second generation of the Neufeldt and Kuhnke suit to 530 feet (160 m), but limb movement was very difficult and the joints were judged not to be fail-safe, in that if they were to fail, there was a possibility that the suit's integrity would be violated. However, these suits were used by the Germans as armored divers during World War II and were later taken by the Western Allies after the war.

In 1952, Alfred A. Mikalow constructed an ADS employing ball and socket joints, specifically for the purpose of locating and salvaging sunken treasure. The suit was reportedly capable of diving to depths of 1,000 feet (300 m) and was used successfully to dive on the sunken vessel SS City of Rio de Janeiro in 328 feet (100 m) of water near Fort Point, San Francisco. Mikalow's suit had various interchangeable instruments which could be mounted on the end of the arms in place of the usual manipulators. It carried seven 90-cubic foot high-pressure cylinders to provide breathing gas and control buoyancy. The ballast compartment covered the gas cylinders. For communication, the suit used hydrophones.

=== Peress' Tritonia ===
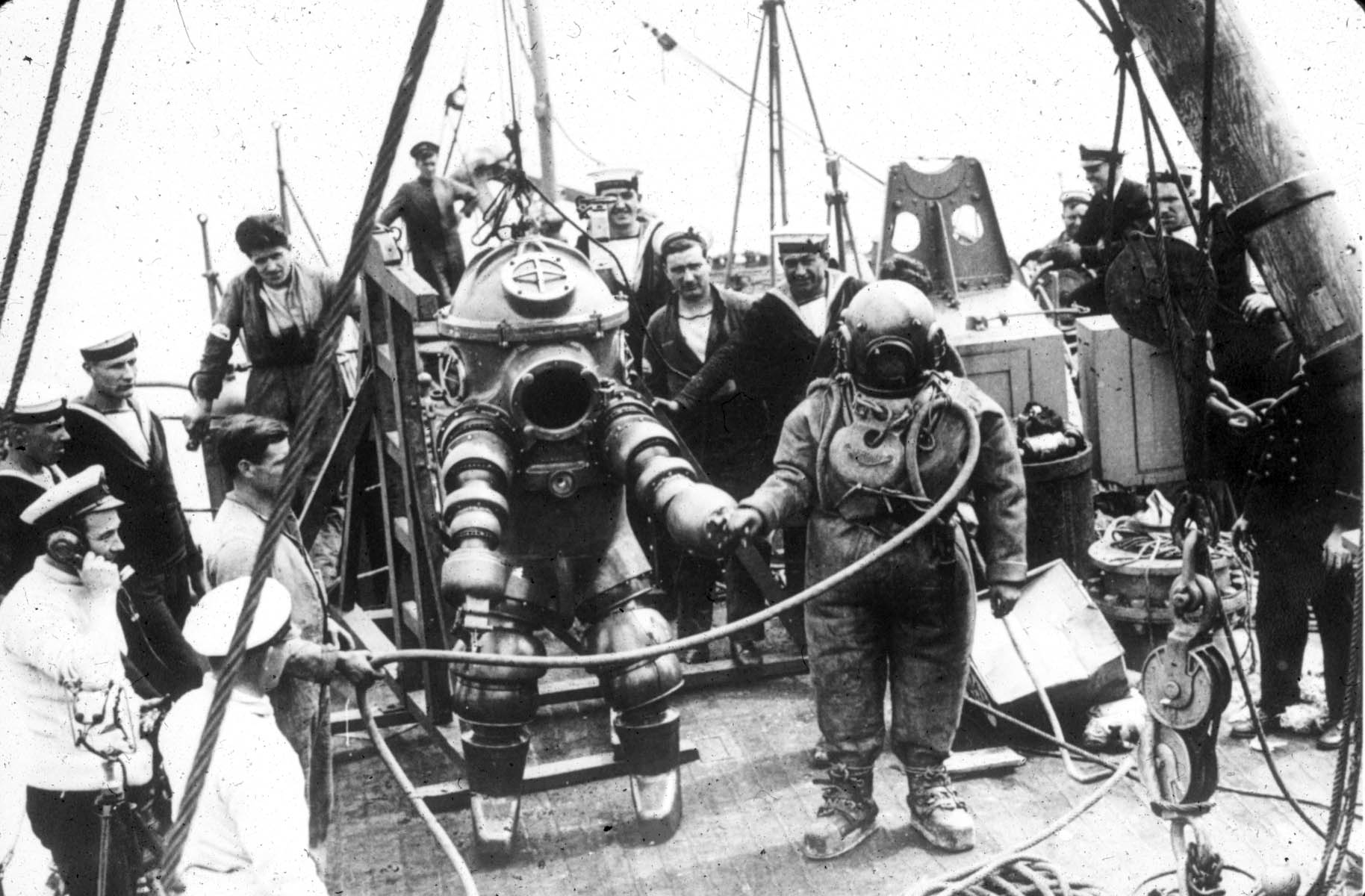
Two divers, one wearing the "Tritonia" ADS and the other standard diving dress, preparing to explore the wreck of RMS Lusitania, 1935.

Although various atmospheric suits had been developed during the Victorian era, none of these suits had been able to overcome the basic design problem of constructing a joint that would remain flexible and watertight at depth without seizing up under pressure.

Pioneering British diving engineer, Joseph Salim Peress, invented the first truly usable atmospheric diving suit, the Tritonia, in 1932 and was later involved in the construction of the famous JIM suit. Having a natural talent for engineering design, he challenged himself to construct an ADS that would keep divers dry and at atmospheric pressure, even at great depth. In 1918, Peress began working for WG Tarrant at Byfleet, United Kingdom, where he was given the space and tools to develop his ideas about constructing an ADS. His first attempt was an immensely complex prototype machined from solid stainless steel.

In 1923, Peress was asked to design a suit for salvage work on the wreck of SS Egypt which had sunk in the English Channel. He declined, on the grounds that his prototype suit was too heavy for a diver to handle easily, but was encouraged by the request to begin work on a new suit using lighter materials. By 1929 he believed he had solved the weight problem, by using cast magnesium instead of steel, and had also managed to improve the design of the suit's joints by using a trapped cushion of oil to keep the surfaces moving smoothly. The oil, which was virtually non-compressible and readily displaceable, would allow the limb joints to move freely at depths of 200 fathoms (1,200 ft; 370 m), where the pressure was 520 psi (35 atm). Peress claimed that the Tritonia suit could function at 1,200 ft (370 m) although this was never proven.

In 1930, Peress revealed the Tritonia suit. By May it had completed trials and was publicly demonstrated in a tank at Byfleet. In September Peress' assistant Jim Jarret dived in the suit to a depth of 123 m (404 ft) in Loch Ness. The suit performed perfectly, the joints proving resistant to pressure and moving freely even at depth. The suit was offered to the Royal Navy which turned it down, stating that Navy divers never needed to descend below 90 m (300 ft). In October 1935, Jarret made a successful deep dive to more than 90 m (300 ft) on the wreck of RMS Lusitania off south Ireland, followed by a shallower dive to 60 metres (200 ft) in the English Channel in 1937 after which, due to lack of interest, the Tritonia suit was retired.

The development in atmospheric pressure suits stagnated in the 1940s through 1960s, as efforts were concentrated on solving the problems of deep diving by dealing with the physiological problems of ambient pressure diving instead of avoiding them by isolating the diver from the pressure. Although the advances in ambient pressure diving (in particular, with scuba gear) were significant, the limitations brought renewed interest to the development of the ADS in the late 1960s.

=== The JIM suit ===
The Tritonia suit spent about 30 years in an engineering company's warehouse in Glasgow, where it was discovered, with Peress' help, by two partners in the British firm Underwater Marine Equipment, Mike Humphrey and Mike Borrow, in the mid-1960s. UMEL would later classify Peress' suit as the "A.D.S Type I", a designation system that would be continued by the company for later models. In 1969, Peress was asked to become a consultant to the new company created to develop the JIM suit, named in honour of the diver Jim Jarret.

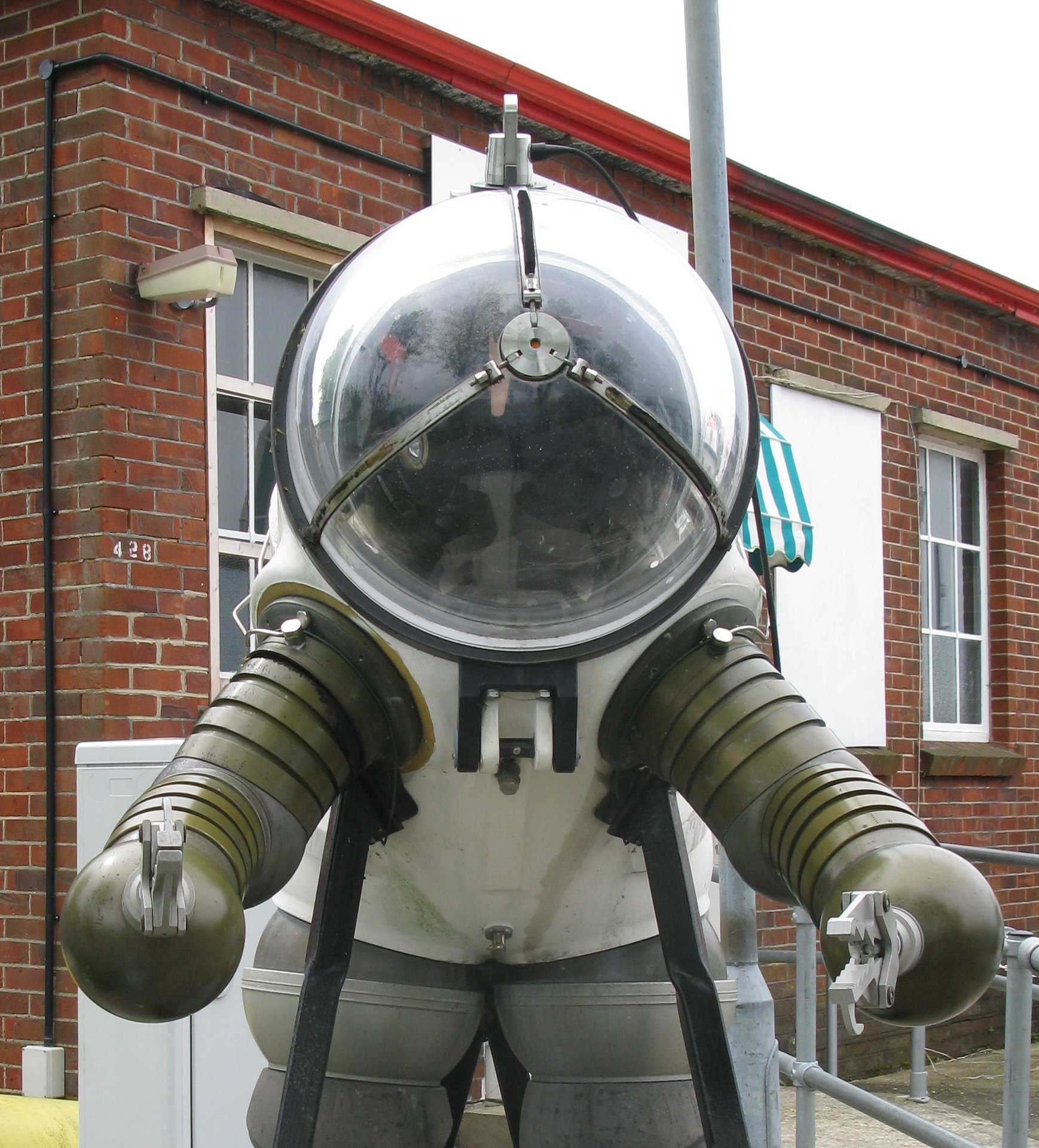
A JIM suit on display at the Royal Navy Submarine Museum, Gosport

The Tritonia suit was upgraded into the first JIM suit, completed in November 1971. This suit underwent trials aboard HMS Reclaim in early 1972, and in 1976, the JIM suit set a record for the longest working dive below 490 feet (150 m), lasting five hours and 59 minutes at a depth of 905 feet (276 m). The first JIM suits were constructed from cast magnesium for its high strength-to-weight ratio and weighed approximately 1,100 pounds (500 kg) in air including the diver. They were 6 feet 6 inches (2.0 m) in height and had a maximum operating depth of 1,500 feet (460 m). The suit had a positive buoyancy of 15 to 50 pounds (6.8 to 22.7 kg). Ballast was attached to the suit's front and could be jettisoned from within, allowing the operator to ascend to the surface at approximately 100 feet (30 m) per minute. The suit also incorporated a communication link and a jettisonable umbilical connection. The original JIM suit had eight annular oil-supported universal joints, one in each shoulder and lower arm, and one at each hip and knee. The JIM operator received air through an oral/nasal mask that attached to a lung-powered scrubber that had a life-support duration of approximately 72 hours. Operations in arctic conditions with water temperatures of -1.7 °C for over five hours were successfully carried out using woolen thermal protection and neoprene boots. In 30 °C water, the suit was reported to be uncomfortably hot during heavy work.

As technology improved and operational knowledge grew, Oceaneering upgraded its fleet of JIMs. The magnesium construction was replaced with glass-reinforced plastic (GRP) and the single joints with segmented ones, each allowing seven degrees of motion, and when added together giving the operator a very great range of motion. In addition, the four-port domed top of the suit was replaced by a transparent acrylic one that was taken from Wasp, this allowed the operator a much-improved field of vision. Trials were also carried out by the Ministry of Defence on a flying Jim suit powered from the surface through an umbilical cable. This resulted in a hybrid suit with the ability to work on the sea bed as well as mid-water.

=== Later developments ===
In addition to upgrades to the JIM design, other variations of the original suit were constructed. The first, named the SAM Suit (Designated A.D.S III), was a completely aluminium model. A smaller and lighter suit, it was more anthropomorphic than the original JIMs and was depth-rated to 1,000 feet (300 m). Attempts were made to limit corrosion by the use of a chromic anodizing coating applied to the arm and leg joints, which gave them an unusual green color. The SAM suit stood at 6 feet 3 inches (1.91 m) in height, and had a life-support duration of 20 hours. Only three SAM suits would be produced by UMEL before the design was shelved. The second, named the JAM suit (Designated A.D.S IV), was constructed of GRP and was depth-rated for around 2,000 feet (610 m).

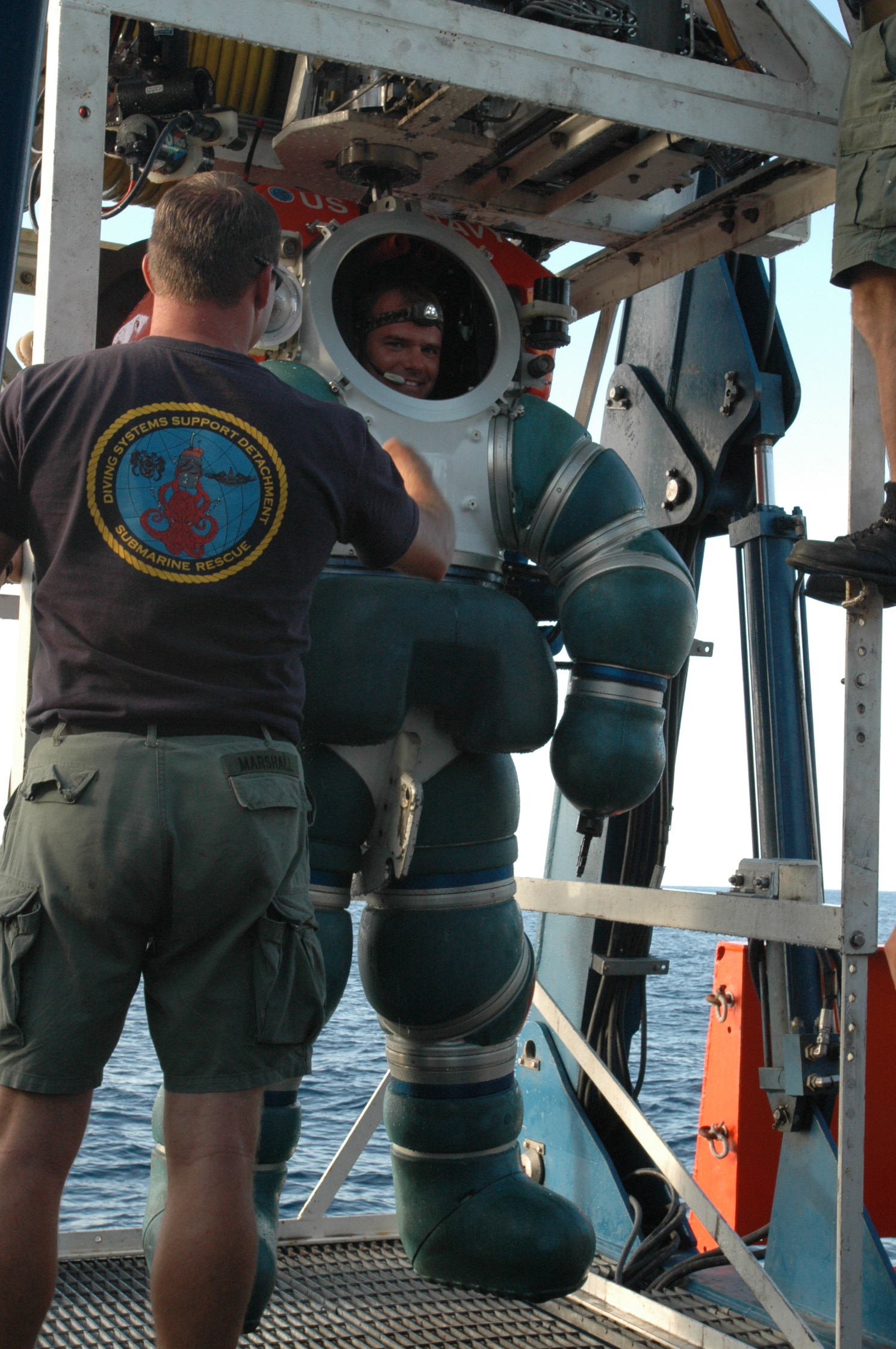
US Navy ADS 2000 on launch and recovery platform after a certification dive in August 2006.

In 1987, the "Newtsuit" was developed by the Canadian engineer Phil Nuytten. The Newtsuit is constructed to function like a "submarine you can wear", allowing the diver to work at normal atmospheric pressure even at depths of over 1,000 feet (300 m). Made of wrought aluminium, it had fully articulated joints so the diver can move more easily underwater. The life-support system provides six to eight hours of air, with an emergency backup supply of an additional 48 hours. The Newtsuit was used to salvage the bell from the wreck of SS Edmund Fitzgerald in 1995. A more recent design by Nuytten is the Exosuit, a relatively lightweight suit intended for marine research. It was first used in 2014 at the Bluewater and Antikythera underwater research expeditions.

The ADS 2000 was developed jointly with OceanWorks International and the US Navy in 1997, as an evolution of the Newtsuit to meet US Navy requirements. The ADS2000 provides increased depth capability for the US Navy's Submarine Rescue Program. Manufactured from forged T6061 aluminum alloy it uses an advanced articulating joint design based on the Newtsuit joints. Capable of operating in up to 2,000 feet (610 m) of seawater for a normal mission of up to six hours it has a self-contained, automatic life support system. Additionally, the integrated dual thruster system allows the pilot to navigate easily underwater. It became fully operational and certified by the US Navy off southern California on 1 August 2006, when a diver submerged to 2,000 feet (610 m).

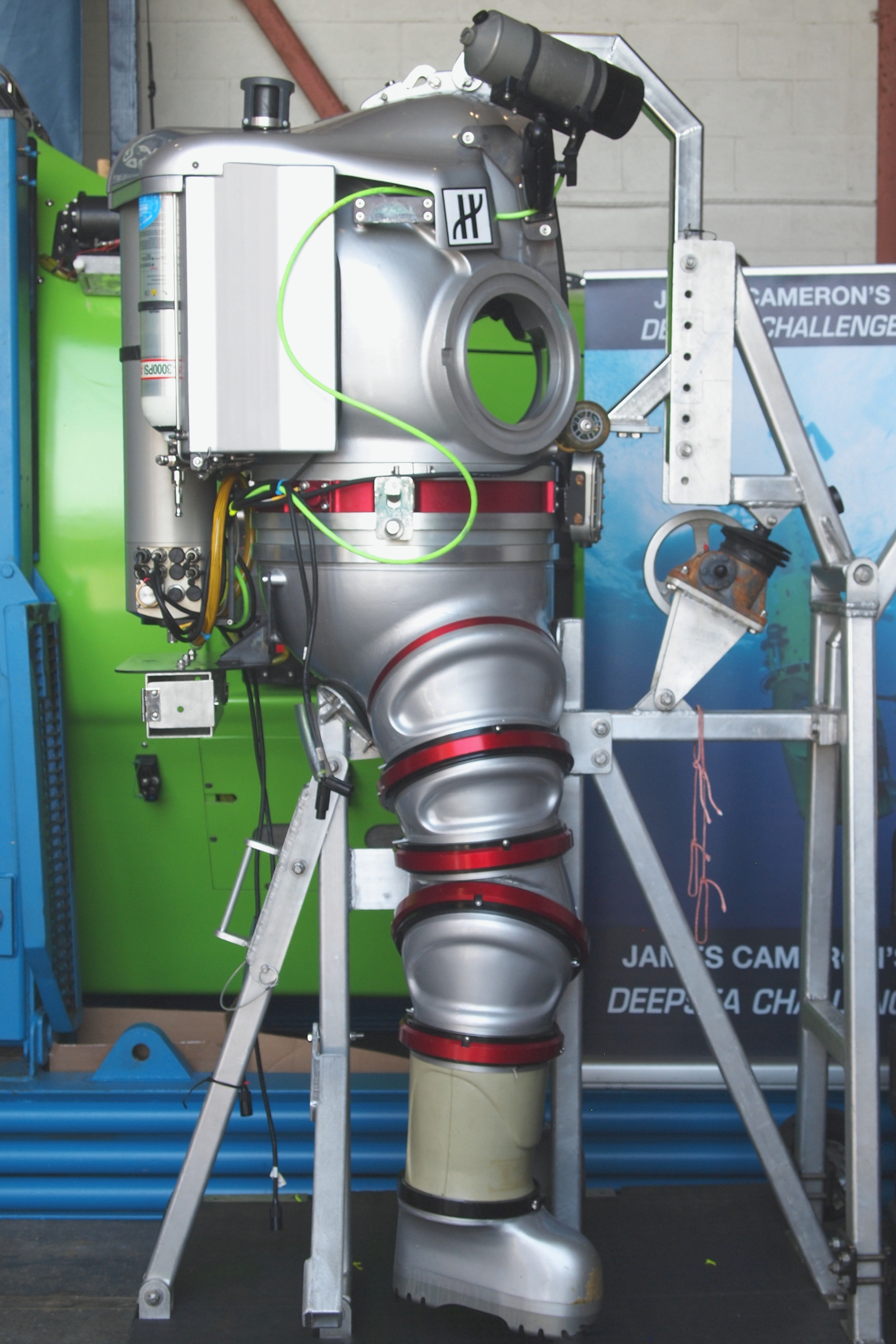
Side view of Exosuit

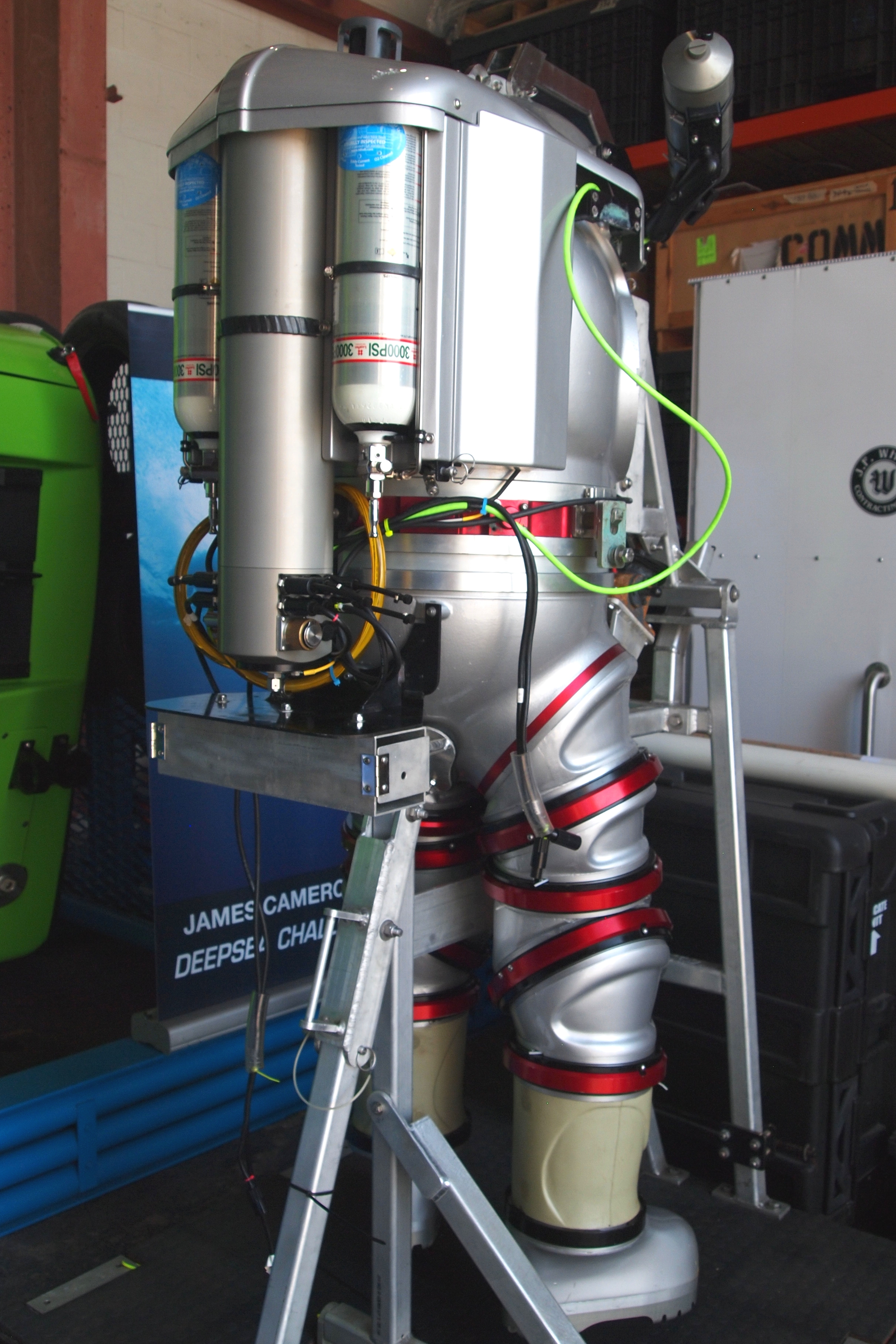
Back view of Exosuit

== Physiological discoveries ==
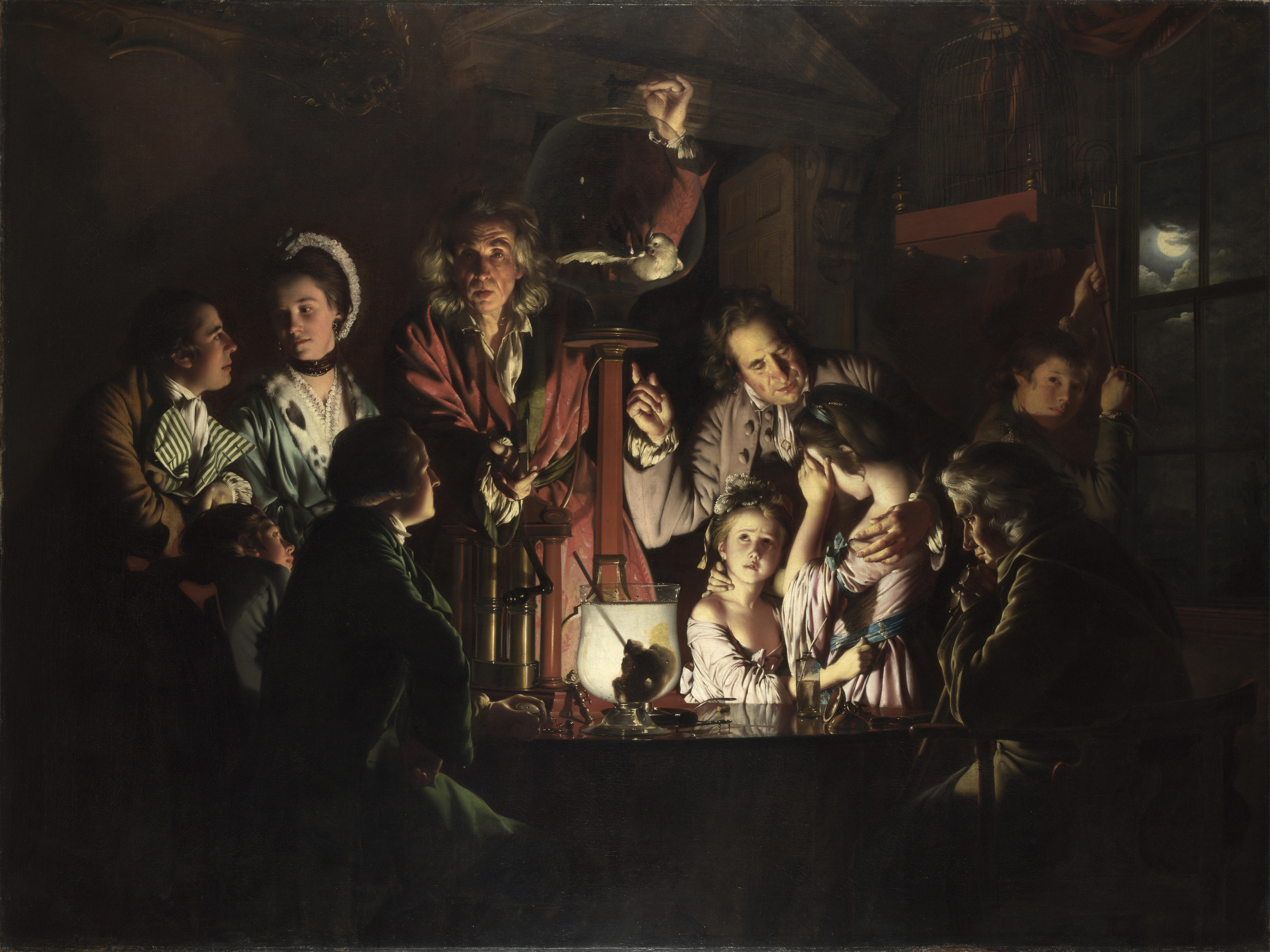
This painting, An Experiment on a Bird in the Air Pump by Joseph Wright of Derby, 1768, depicts an experiment performed by Robert Boyle in 1660.

A change in pressure may have an immediate effect on the ears and sinuses, causing pain and leading to congestion, edema, hemorrhaging, and temporary to permanent hearing impairment. These effects have been familiar to breath-hold divers since antiquity and are avoided by equalisation techniques. Reduction of ambient pressure during ascent can cause overpressure injury to internal gas spaces if not allowed to freely equalise. Health effects in divers include damage to the joints and bones similar to symptoms attributed to caisson disease in compressed air workers, which was found to be caused by too rapid a decompression to atmospheric pressure after long exposure to a pressurised environment

When a diver descends in the water column, the ambient pressure rises. Breathing gas is supplied at the same pressure as the surrounding water, and some of this gas dissolves into the diver's blood and other tissues. Inert gas continues to be taken up until the gas dissolved in the diver is in a state of equilibrium with the breathing gas in the diver's lungs, (see: "saturation diving"), or the diver moves up in the water column and reduces the ambient pressure of the breathing gas until the inert gases dissolved in the tissues are at a higher concentration than the equilibrium state, and start diffusing out again. Dissolved inert gases such as nitrogen or helium can form bubbles in the blood and tissues of the diver if the partial pressures of the dissolved gases in the diver gets too high when compared to the ambient pressure. These bubbles, and products of injury caused by the bubbles, can cause damage to tissues known as decompression sickness or the bends. The immediate goal of controlled decompression is to avoid development of symptoms of bubble formation in the tissues of the diver, and the long-term goal is to also avoid complications due to sub-clinical decompression injury.

The symptoms of decompression sickness are known to be caused by damage resulting from the formation and growth of bubbles of inert gas within the tissues and by blockage of arterial blood supply to tissues by gas bubbles and other emboli consequential to bubble formation and tissue damage. The precise mechanisms of bubble formation and the damage they cause have been the subject of medical research for a considerable time and several hypotheses have been advanced and tested. Tables and algorithms for predicting the outcome of decompression schedules for specified hyperbaric exposures have been proposed, tested, and used, and usually found to be of some use but not entirely reliable. Decompression remains a procedure with some risk, but this has been reduced and is generally considered to be acceptable for dives within the well-tested range of commercial, military and recreational diving.

The first recorded experimental work related to decompression was conducted by Robert Boyle, who subjected experimental animals to reduced ambient pressure by use of a primitive vacuum pump. In the earliest experiments, the subjects died from asphyxiation, but in later experiments, signs of what was later to become known as decompression sickness were observed. Later, when technological advances allowed the use of pressurisation of mines and caissons to exclude water ingress, miners were observed to present symptoms of what would become known as caisson disease, the bends, and decompression sickness. Once it was recognized that the symptoms were caused by gas bubbles and that recompression could relieve the symptoms, further work showed that it was possible to avoid symptoms by slow decompression, and subsequently, various theoretical models have been derived to predict low-risk decompression profiles and treatment of decompression sickness.

By the late 19th century, as salvage operations became deeper and longer, an unexplained malady began afflicting the divers; they would suffer breathing difficulties, dizziness, joint pain, and paralysis, sometimes leading to death. The problem was already well known among workers building tunnels and bridge footings operating under pressure in caissons and was initially called "caisson disease" but later the "bends" because the joint pain typically caused the sufferer to stoop. Early reports of the disease had been made at the time of Pasley's salvage operation, but scientists were still ignorant of its causes. Early treatment methods involved returning the diver to pressurised conditions by re-immersion in the water.

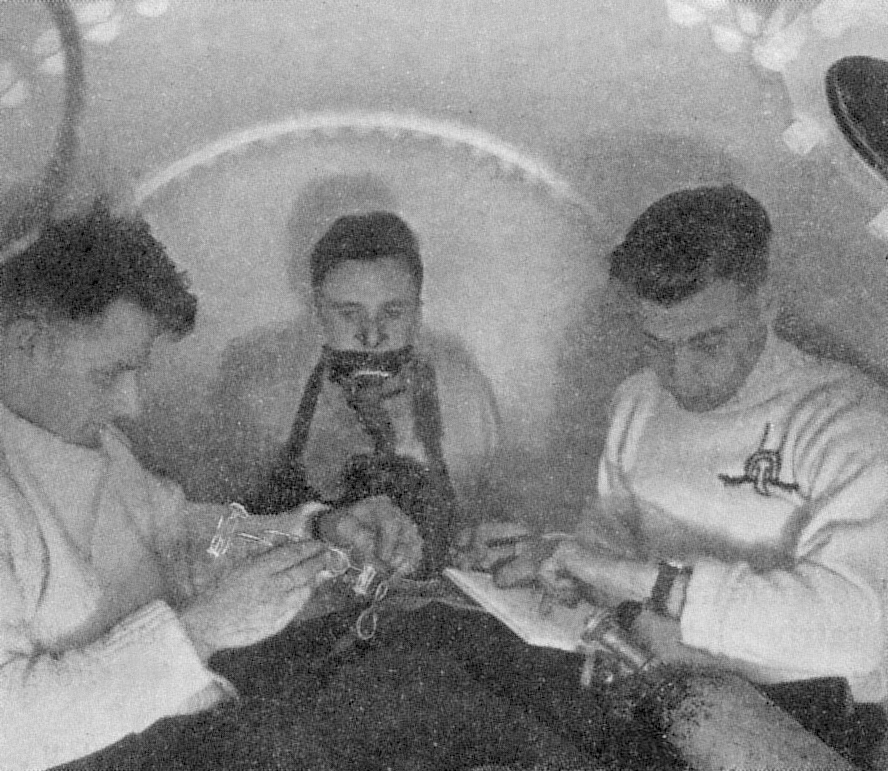
In 1942–43 the UK Government carried out extensive testing for oxygen toxicity in divers.

French physiologist Paul Bert was the first to understand it as decompression sickness. His classical work, La Pression Barometrique (1878), was a comprehensive investigation into the physiological effects of air pressure, both above and below the normal. He determined that inhaling pressurized air caused the nitrogen to dissolve into the bloodstream; rapid depressurization would then release the nitrogen into its natural gaseous state, forming bubbles that could block the blood circulation and potentially cause paralysis or death. Central nervous system oxygen toxicity was also first described in this publication and is sometimes referred to as the "Paul Bert effect".

John Scott Haldane designed a decompression chamber in 1907 to help make deep-sea divers safer and he produced the first decompression tables for the Royal Navy in 1908 after extensive experiments with animals and human subjects. These tables established a method of decompression in stages - it remains the basis for decompression methods to this day. Following Haldane's recommendation, the maximum safe operating depth for divers was extended to 200 feet (61 m).

Research on decompression was continued by the US Navy. The C&R tables were published in 1915, and a large number of experimental dives done in the 1930s, which led to the 1937 tables. Surface decompression and oxygen use were also researched in the 1930s, and the US Navy 1957 tables developed to deal with problems found in the 1937 tables.

In 1965, Hugh LeMessurier and Brian Hills published their paper, A thermodynamic approach arising from a study on Torres Strait diving techniques, which suggested that decompression by conventional models results in bubble formation which is then eliminated by re-dissolving at the decompression stops which is slower than off-gassing while still in solution. This indicates the importance of minimizing bubble phase for efficient gas elimination.

M.P. Spencer showed that doppler ultrasonic methods can detect venous bubbles in asymptomatic divers, and Andrew Pilmanis showed that safety stops reduced bubble formation. In 1981 D.E. Yount described the Varying Permeability Model, proposing a mechanism of bubble formation. Several other bubble models followed.
