= Auguste Denayrouze =

French inventor of a demand air supply regulator for underwater diving

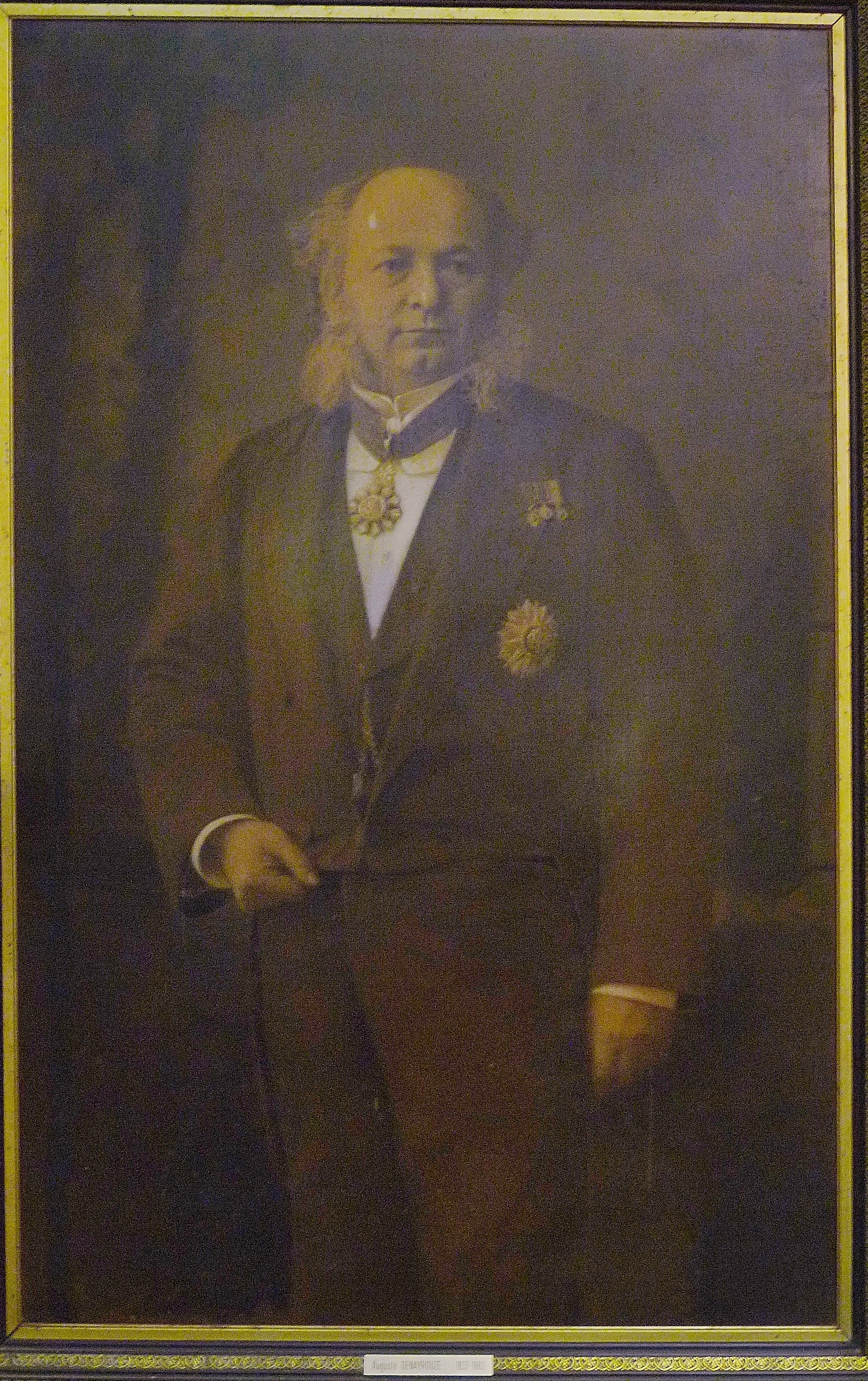
Portrait of Auguste Denayrouze

August Denayrouze (1 October 1837 – 1 January 1883) was a French engineer and inventor. He was the inventor of a demand valve for control of breathing air supply, and one of the inventors of a diving suit, along with Benoît Rouquayrol.

== Biography ==
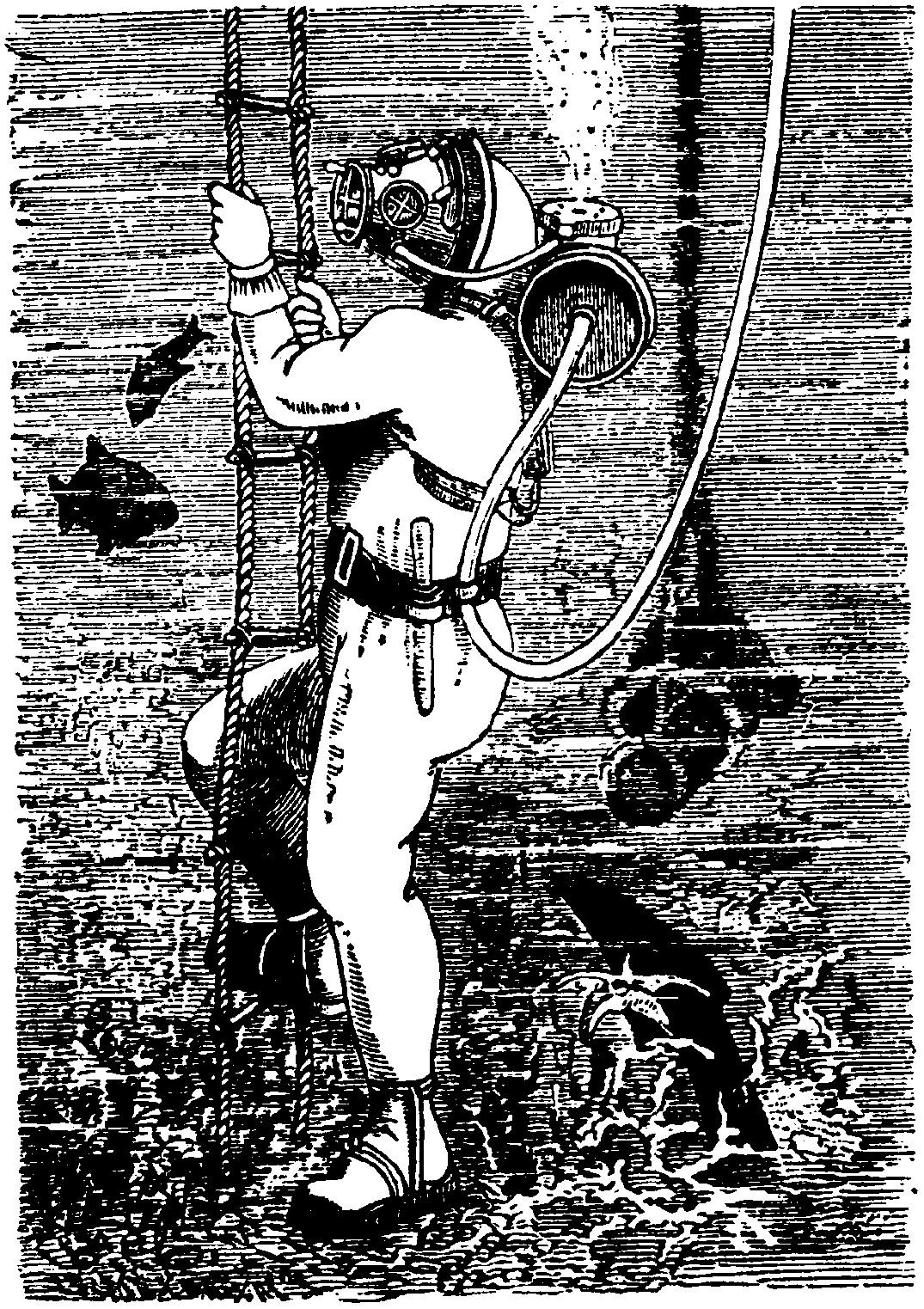
A Rouquayrol-Denayrouze diving apparatus, in which air is pumped from the surface into a barrel-shaped reservoir, and then passes through the pressure-regulator built into the helmet.

Denayrouze was born on 1 October 1837 in Montpeyroux, Aveyron, France. In 1852, at the age of fifteen, he was admitted to the Naval School. He was promoted to lieutenant de vaisseau in 1862, and embarked on an expedition to Cochinchina (present-day Vietnam). He contracted a serious illness which rendered him unfit for service at sea. While recovering in the commune of Espalion, Denayrouze met Benoît Rouquayrol, with whom he collaborated in several inventions.

Since 1860, Rouquayrol took out three patents for equipment intended for mining emergencies, to supply miners with air in case of firedamp or flooding of the mine. Denayrouze investigated the possibility of adapting the pressure regulator and developing it for underwater use. The two men thus designed and patented their "Rouquayrol-Denayrouze diving suit" in 1864. This was the first diving suit that could supply air to the diver on demand. In the same year, the Imperial French Navy created a similar device.

In February 1865, August Denayrouze created the "Rouquayrol-Denayrouze Society" to commercialize their inventions for sale to both the Navy and to private enterprises. The same year, he created the "French Society for Fish and Sponges Of The Eastern Mediterranean," based in İzmir, Turkey. Two years later, the Rouquayrol-Denayrouze diving apparatus was presented at the 1867 World's Fair and won the gold medal.

Jules Verne, who attended the exposition, discovered the invention with enthusiasm and chose it as the equipment for his fictional Captain Nemo and the crew of the Nautilus in the 1870 novel Twenty Thousand Leagues Under the Seas. Verne paid homage to the inventors by mentioning them by name.

In 1869, Denayrouze passed governance of the Society for Fish and Sponges to his brother, Louis Denayrouze, so that he could advance the commercial interests of the diving apparatus in the Eastern Mediterranean. In 1874, August Denayrouze dissolved both societies and created a single "Reunited Society for Mechanical Specialities," with his brother Louis as its director.

Denayrouze died on 1 January 1883, aged 45, of illness.

== See also ==
- Augustus Siebe – British engineer mostly known for his contributions to diving equipment
- Benoît Rouquayrol – French inventor of an early diving demand regulator
- Diving regulator – Mechanism that controls the pressure of a breathing gas supply for diving
- Charles Anthony Deane – English diving engineer and inventor of a surface supplied diving helmet
- John Deane (inventor) – Joint inventor of the diving helmet
- Standard diving dress – Copper helmet with rubberised canvas diving suit and weighted boots
- Timeline of diving technology – Chronological list of notable events in the history of underwater diving equipment
- History of underwater diving – Developments over time in the human activity
