= Benoît Rouquayrol =

French inventor of an early diving demand regulator

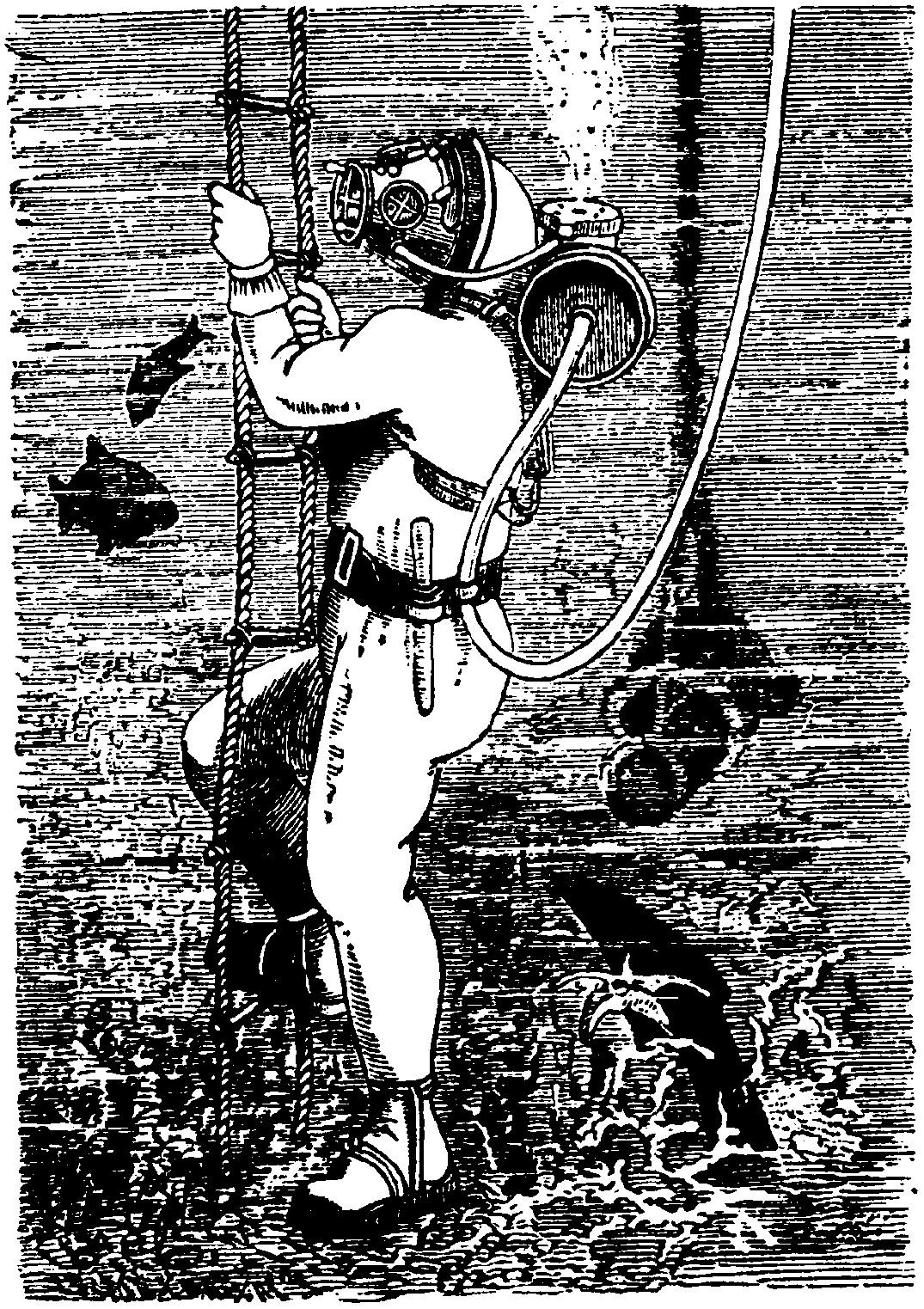
A Rouquayrol-Denayrouze diving apparatus, in which air is pumped from the surface into a barrel-shaped reservoir, and then passes through the pressure-regulator built into the helmet.

Benoît Rouquayrol (1826–1875) was a French inventor. Along with Auguste Denayrouze, Rouquayrol invented a diving suit and breathing apparatus.

== Biography ==
Benoît Rouquayrol was born on 13 June 1826 in Espalion, in the Aveyron department of Southern France. He became an engineer at the Saint-Étienne School of Mines. He became employed at a company involved in bituminous coal mining and foundries in Aveyron, and became the director of accounting by 1865.

In 1860, Rouquayrol became concerned with mine safety problems related to firedamp (flammable natural gases in coal mines). He created a rescue apparatus consisting of a pressurized gas chamber coupled to a pressure regulator that he called the "Regulator for Equalization of Compressed Gas". In 1864, with the help of the French Navy lieutenant Auguste Denayrouze (also of Aveyron), Rouquayrol created a diving suit. which won the gold medal at the 1867 World's Fair, and drew the attention of the author Jules Verne. Verne included the diving suit in his 1869-70 fictional depiction of a contemporary submarine voyage, Twenty Thousand Leagues Under the Seas.

Rouquayrol died on 14 November 1875 in Rodez, Aveyron, France.

== Chronology of patents and inventions ==
- April 14, 1860: Rouquayrol disclosed a patent for a regulator designed for a rescue-apparatus for miners who were victims of firedamp or asphyxiation
- January 16, 1862: Rouquayrol disclosed a patent for the "Rouquayrol Isolator" composed of a regulator with a diving mask fitted over the nose and mouth, using a vulcanized rubber seal affixed inside a metallic beak. This system eliminated the need for a heavy metallic diving helmet.
- August 25, 1863: a patent for a "hydraulic joint" pressurizing pump, in which the pistons were fixed and the body of the pump moved.

Additionally, Rouquayrol contributed to related inventions in co-operation with Auguste Denayrouze and others.
