= Siebe Gorman Salvus =

Industrial rescue and shallow water oxygen rebreather

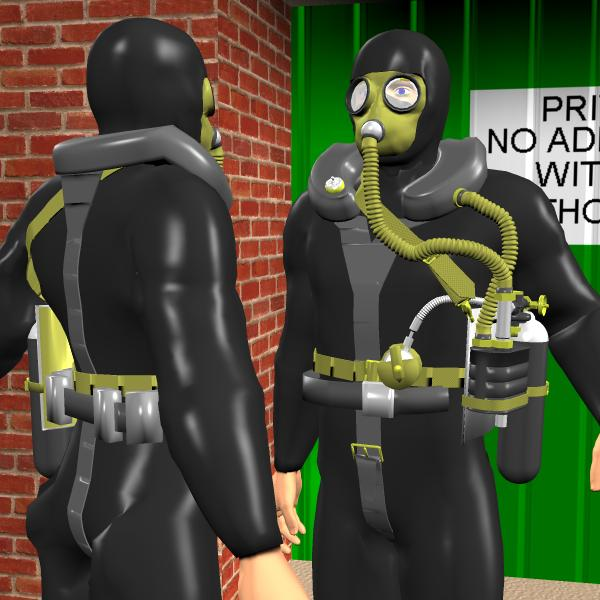
CGI image: 2 views of a diver wearing a Siebe Gorman Salvus rebreather

The Siebe Gorman Salvus is a light oxygen rebreather for industrial use (including by firemen and in coalmine rescue) or in shallow diving. Its duration on a filling is 30 to 40 minutes. It was very common in Britain during World War II and for a long time afterwards. Underwater the Salvus is very compact and can be used where a diver with a bigger breathing set cannot get in, such as inside cockpits of ditched aircraft. It was made by Siebe Gorman & Company, LTD in London, England. It was designed in the early 1900s.

== Function ==
Its arrangement can be seen from the image. It is a pendulum-type system with one breathing tube. This type is the Neck Salvus: there was another type, for use on land only, where the counterlung (= breathing bag) hung by his left hip from the cylinder and canister pack. That pack is a metal plate (probably aluminium), with a webbing sheet stuck to one side to protect its user's diving suit or overall. The absorbent canister and the cylinder are fastened to it by a strap that can be unbuckled. It has no plastic in its construction.

The mask has an inner orinasal mask to cut down on dead-space. It does not have a shutoff valve. It has a wooden plug fastened to it by a light chain; that plug fits into the breathing tube entry inside the mask to stop debris from entering, but is not a watertight seal. The mask and its tube unscrews from the canister and can be replaced by a tube ending in a mouthpiece. The mouthpiece tube has a shutoff valve at the mouthpiece. The Salvus mouthpiece also has an attached noseclip. A pair of industrial-type eyes-only goggles was included with the set when it came. That mouthpiece has an outer flap that goes outside the lips and is extended into straps fastened behind the neck.

(That makes the mouthpiece much securer against coming out or leaking. In a test when diving with an open-circuit aqualung that had that sort of strapped-in mouthpiece, the diver went limp as if unconscious, to test the mouthpiece, and as a result he rolled belly-up, and his cheeks inflated, and the mouthpiece tried to float out, but its strap and outer flap kept it in and watertight.)

The breathing bag makes the diver very stern-heavy, but that can be cured by putting 6 pounds of diver's weights (e.g. a pair of lead-shot-filled anklets) inside the wetsuit chest. The Salvus has no provision to connect to a buoyancy device; but the Salvus can be worn with a separate diver's lifejacket (not a stab jacket) which has its own small inflation cylinder.

There is a small water catchment sump and drain on the underside of the canister. Its cylinder pressure gauge is on a flexible metal tube and fits in a circular webbing pouch threaded on the waist harness strap.

The bag tube unscrews from the canister pack. The diagonal strap clips onto a corner of the side-pack. The cylinder has a constant-flow valve and a bypass. The thread on top of the cylinder is the same as on an oxy-gas torch oxygen cylinder but the opposite gender, for easy refilling by decanting.

== History ==
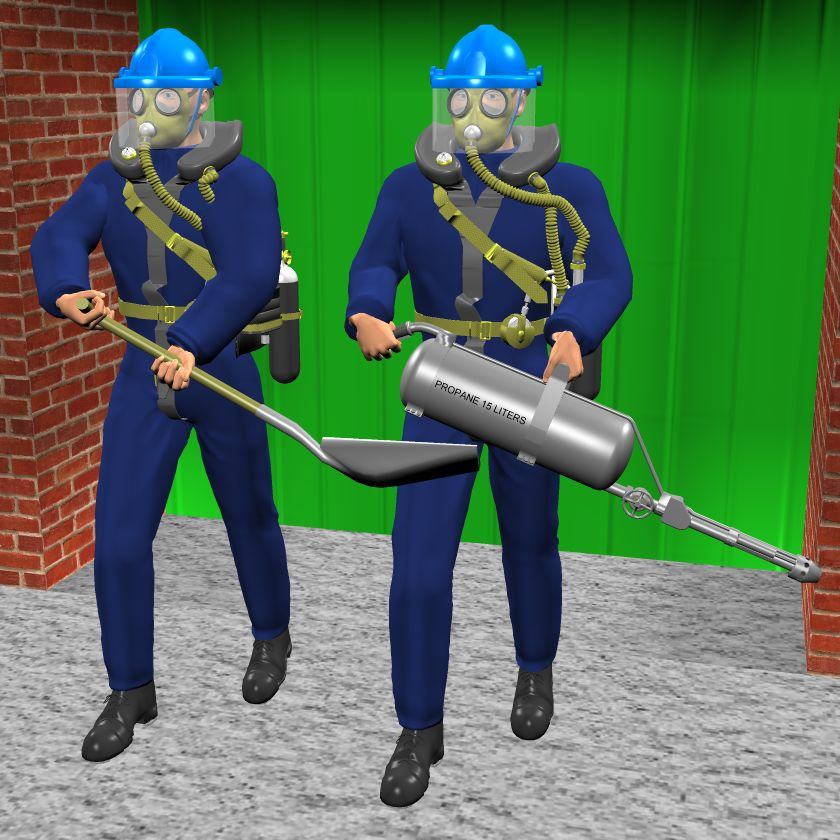
CGI image. 2 workmen with Siebe Gorman Salvus rebreathers set off to clean up a building after fumigation.

Early versions were originally designed for use in bad breathing conditions such as in underground mines and other enclosed spaces, where heavy concentrations of noxious gases could build up and affect the workers.

During World War I, Salvuses were used by machine gunner units on the Western Front (1915) as an interim protection against enemy gas weapons. During World War II the Salvus Mk.VI model was used by British troops. Mk. VI's were also used by the National Fire Service: their cooler boxes were marked with the letters 'NFS'.

War-surplus Salvuses were much used by early sport divers in Britain and Australia in the 1950s before aqualungs became readily affordably available.

At the coalmine rescue on 7–9 September 1950 at Knockshinnoch Castle Colliery near New Cumnock, Ayrshire, Scotland, 115 trapped miners were equipped with Salvuses borrowed from fire stations around to bring them out through a gas-filled mine passage.
