= Blackett's Aerophor =

Nitrox semi-closed-circuit rebreather with liquid gas storage

Distinguish from aerophor (or aerophore) (a device to assist musicians playing wind instruments) and from aerophone.

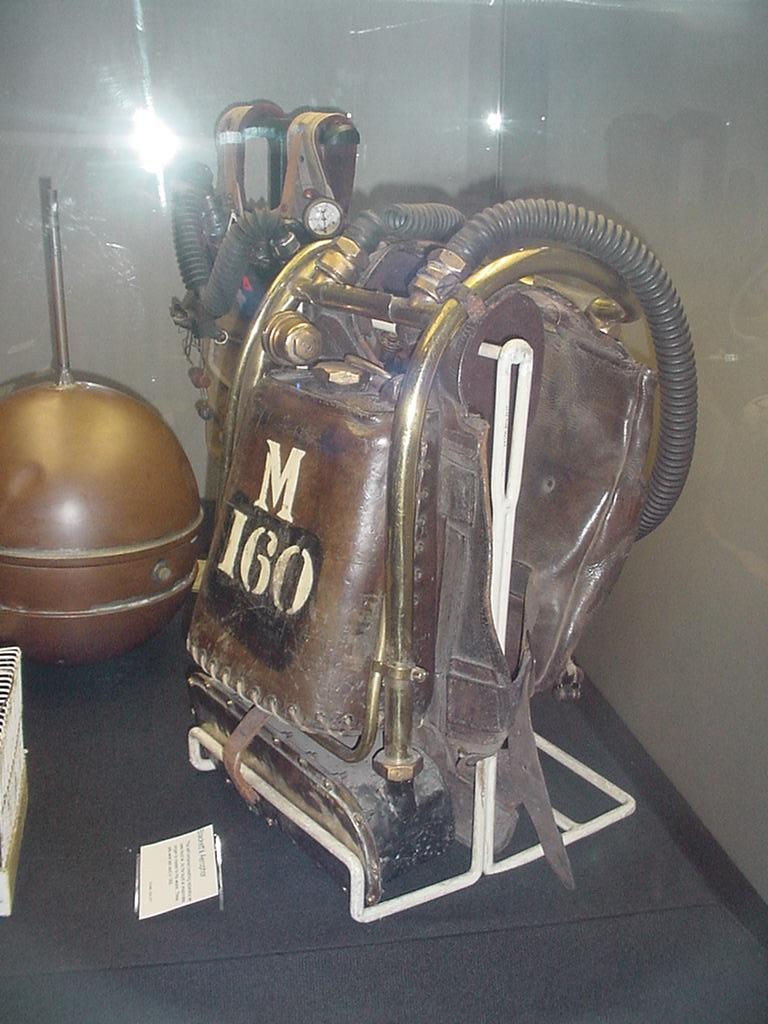
An Aerophor at the National Coal Mining Museum for England

The Blackett's Aerophor is a nitrox semi-closed-circuit rebreather with liquid gas storage made in England from 1910 onwards for use in mine rescue and other industrial uses. It was used until the 1950s. "Aerophor" is from Greek αεροφορος = "air-carrier".

Its breathing bag was on the chest, of rubber, in a strong leather case. The other parts were in a backpack. It had two corrugated breathing tubes coming out of the backpack. Its duration on a fill was 2 hours. It had:

- A heat-insulated tank containing 5½ pounds of liquid nitrox containing at least 50% of oxygen, which had to be filled immediately before use.
- At the bottom of the backpack, a large canister filled with 2 pounds of what one description called "potash" and another description "soda".

Colonel Wiliam Cuthbert Blackett, who had previously criticized rescue apparatus as being too complicated for practical use, introduced this Aerophor in the Durham area in 1910, where he was part of the Durham and Northumberland Collieries Fire and Rescue Brigade. It was improved by Messrs G.L. Brown and Frederick P. Mills. All or some of them were made by Guest and Chrimes Ltd. of Rotherham.
