= Pierre-Marie Touboulic =

French engineer, inventor and writer

Pierre-Marie Touboulic (17 June 1783, Brest, France - 8 June 1859 Paris) was a naval engineer, inventor and writer.

== Biography ==
Pierre-Marie Touboulic was born in Brest on 17 June 1783. He was the fifth of six children of master locksmith Jean-Louis Touboulic and Marie Félicité Abalain. His first wife was Hortense Auvray, married on 17 June 1818 in Brest, with whom he had a daughter Hortense Félicité Claudine, born 26 April 1819. He married a second time to Jeanne Augustine Le Donné on 16 May 1825, and a third time to Marie Guillemette Querné on 13 January 1836, both also in Brest.

He was the brother of Toussaint Touboulic, knight of the Order of Saint Louis, and captain of a frigate. The son of one of his cousins, Perrine Jeanne Adélaïde Touboulic, born 11 July 1780 in Lorient, was Louis Maurice Adolphe Linant de Bellefonds, born 23 November 1799.

He was made an Knight of the Legion of Honour in 1825, and died in Paris on 8 June 1859 at 6 rue de Castiglione in the 1st arrondissement.

== Career ==
Touboulic spent his entire working life in Brest. Appointed marine engineer in 1818, he was head of the compass workshop from 1825 to 1836, and later mechanical engineer.

He built models of the ports of Brest, Lorient and Toulon, and a relief map of Rochefort, and invented tools used by various sectors of the navy including a variation compass in 1856 (patent of invention code 26642 at the INPI), a diving bell (departmental archives of Finistère, code 4 T 5), an aerial transport system that he called a velocipost in 1808 (patent number 1BA6239 at the INPI), the ancestor of the first urban cable car, before the railways, in 1838, which was first tested from 3 to 12 October 1838 in the Bois de Bordenave in Brest. The experiment was continued in 1839 for at least three months on the ramparts of Fort Bouguen with the participation of about 800 people. The press of the time (Armoricain) suggested possible uses for transport of convicts, the sick, etc. The Brest cable car was called the Touboulic Express by the city of Brest in 2014.

Touboulic took out a patent on a rebreather, based on the absorption of carbon dioxide on 17 June 1808. It had a tank containing oxygen which was released by the diver, and circulated in a closed circuit through a sponge soaked in lime water. Touboulic called his invention Ichtioandre (Greek for "fish-man").

In 1834, he experimented with submarines on the Loire.

== Bibliography ==
- Touboulicp, P. (1817). Scolegigraphie, ou Méthode prompte, perfectionnée et économique pour l'enseignement simultané de la lecture et de l'écriture... [Scolegigraphie, or Prompt, perfected and economical method for the simultaneous teaching of reading and writing...(Notice on some inventions of M. Touboulic.) (in French). Michel. p. 26.
- Locquin, F. (1839). Véloposte, ou Chemin Touboulic (in French). p. 15.
