= Rebreather =

Portable apparatus to recycle breathing gas

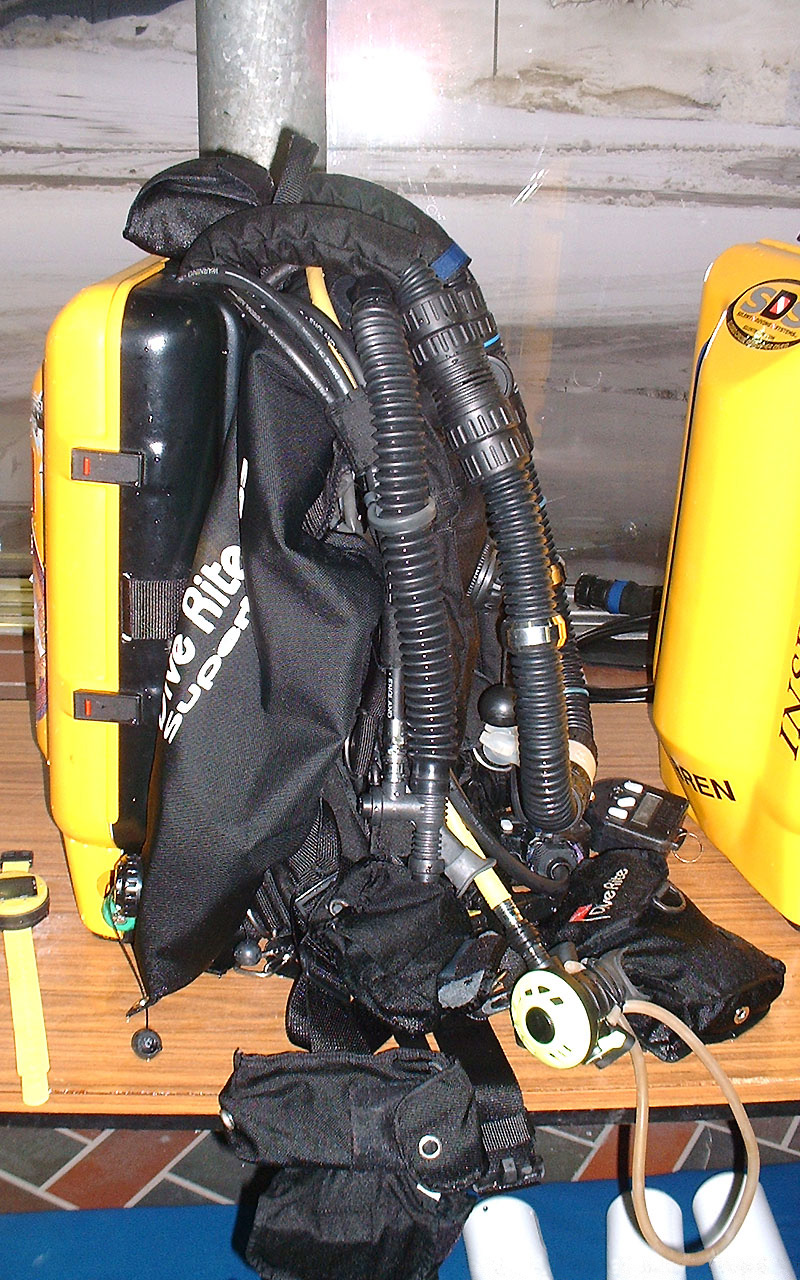
- A fully closed circuit electronic rebreather (AP Diving Inspiration)
- Acronym: CCUBA (closed circuit underwater breathing apparatus); CCR (closed circuit rebreather), SCR (semi-closed rebreather)
- Uses: Breathing set
- Related items: Davis apparatus, Self-contained breathing apparatus, Escape hood

A rebreather is a breathing apparatus that absorbs the carbon dioxide of a user's exhaled breath to permit the rebreathing (recycling) of the substantial unused oxygen content, and unused inert content when present, of each breath. Oxygen is added to replenish the amount metabolised by the user. This differs from open-circuit breathing apparatus, where the exhaled gas is discharged directly into the environment. The purpose is to extend the breathing endurance of a limited gas supply, while also eliminating the bubbles otherwise produced by an open circuit system. The latter advantage over other systems is useful for covert military operations by frogmen, as well as for undisturbed observation of underwater wildlife. A rebreather is generally understood to be a portable apparatus carried by the user. The same technology on a vehicle or non-mobile installation is more likely to be referred to as a life-support system.

Rebreather technology may be used where breathing gas supply is limited, such as underwater, in space, where the environment is toxic or hypoxic (as in firefighting), mine rescue, high-altitude operations, or where the breathing gas is specially enriched or contains expensive components, such as helium diluent or anaesthetic gases.

Rebreathers are used in many environments: underwater, diving rebreathers are a type of self-contained underwater breathing apparatus which have provisions for both a primary and emergency gas supply. On land they are used in industrial applications where poisonous gases may be present or oxygen may be absent, firefighting, where firefighters may be required to operate in an atmosphere immediately dangerous to life and health for extended periods, in hospital anaesthesia breathing systems to supply controlled concentrations of anaesthetic gases to patients without contaminating the air that the staff breathe, and at high altitude, where the partial pressure of oxygen is low, for high altitude mountaineering. In aerospace there are applications in unpressurised aircraft and for high altitude parachute drops, and above the Earth's atmosphere, in space suits for extra-vehicular activity. Similar technology is used in life-support systems in submarines, submersibles, atmospheric diving suits, underwater and surface saturation habitats, spacecraft, and space stations, and in gas reclaim systems used to recover the large volumes of helium used in saturation diving.

The recycling of breathing gas comes at the cost of technological complexity and specific hazards, some of which depend on the application and type of rebreather used. Mass and bulk may be greater or less than open circuit depending on circumstances. Electronically controlled diving rebreathers may automatically maintain a partial pressure of oxygen between programmable upper and lower limits, or set points, and be integrated with decompression computers to monitor the decompression status of the diver and record the dive profile.

== General concept ==
As a person breathes, the body consumes oxygen and produces carbon dioxide. Base metabolism requires about 0.25 L/min of oxygen from a breathing rate of about 6 L/min, and a fit person working hard may ventilate at a rate of 95 L/min but will only metabolise about 4 L/min of oxygen. The oxygen metabolised is generally about 4% to 5% of the inspired volume at normal atmospheric pressure, or about 20% of the available oxygen in the air at sea level. Exhaled air at sea level contains roughly 13.5% to 16% oxygen.

The situation is even more wasteful of oxygen when the oxygen fraction of the breathing gas is higher, and in underwater diving, the compression of breathing gas due to depth makes the recirculation of exhaled gas even more desirable, as an even larger proportion of open circuit gas is wasted. Continued rebreathing of the same gas will deplete the oxygen to a level which will no longer support consciousness, and eventually life, so gas containing oxygen must be added to the breathing gas to maintain the required concentration of oxygen.

However, if this is done without removing the carbon dioxide, it will rapidly build up in the recycled gas, resulting almost immediately in mild respiratory distress, and rapidly developing into further stages of hypercapnia, or carbon dioxide toxicity. A high ventilation rate is usually necessary to eliminate the metabolic product carbon dioxide (CO_{2}). The breathing reflex is triggered by CO_{2} concentration in the blood, not by the oxygen concentration, so even a small buildup of CO_{2} in the inhaled gas quickly becomes intolerable; if a person tries to directly rebreathe their exhaled breathing gas, they will soon feel an acute sense of suffocation, so rebreathers must remove the CO_{2} in a component known as a carbon dioxide scrubber.

By adding sufficient oxygen to compensate for the metabolic usage, removing the carbon dioxide, and rebreathing the gas, most of the volume is conserved.

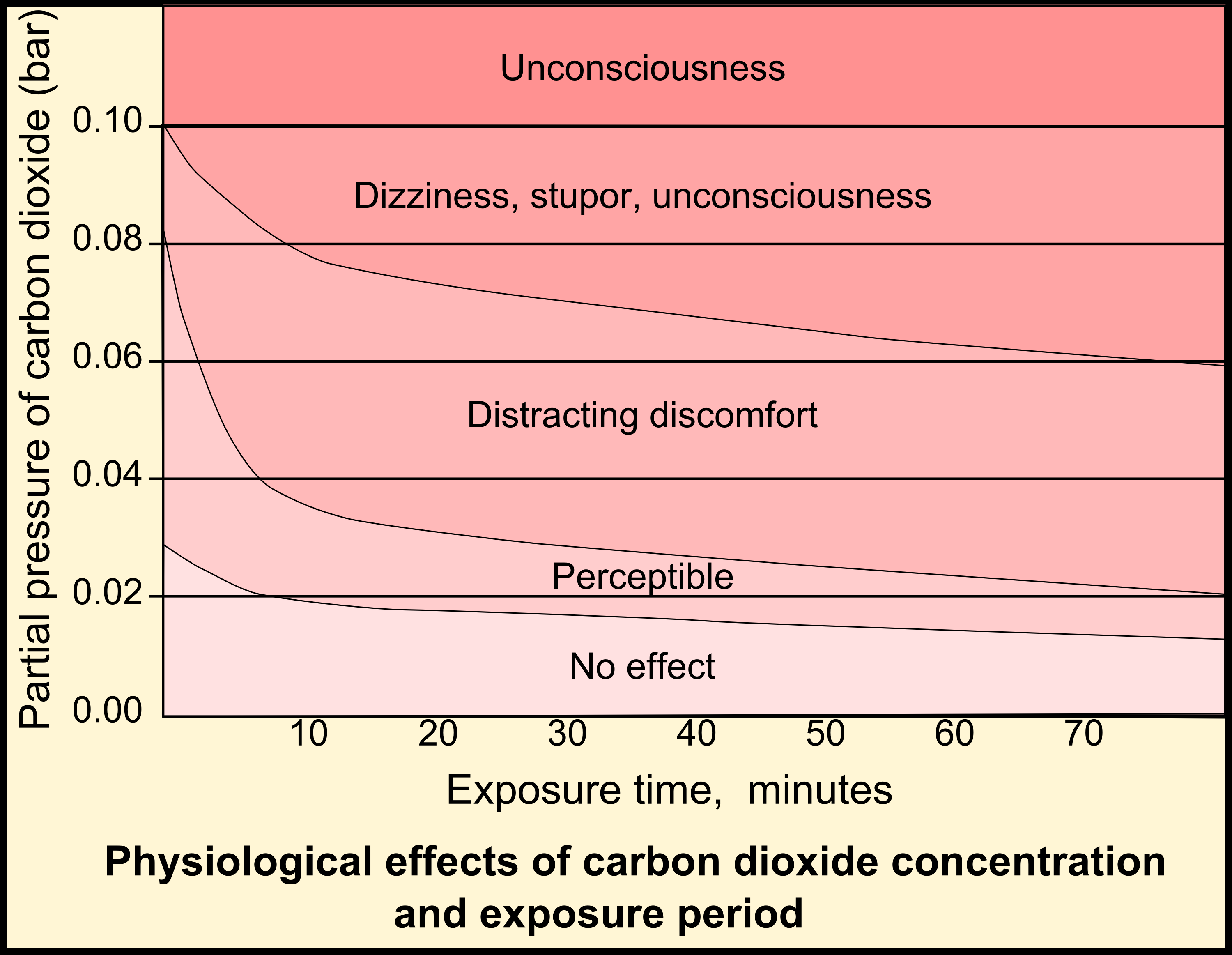
Relation of physiological effects to carbon dioxide concentration and exposure period.

Effects of different levels of oxygen partial pressure
PO_{2} (bar)	Application and effect
<0.08	Coma ultimately leading to death
0.08-0.10	Unconsciousness in most people
0.09-0.10	Serious signs/symptoms of hypoxia
0.14-0.16	Initial signs/symptoms of hypoxia (normal environment oxygen in some very high altitude areas)
0.21	Normal environment oxygen (sea level air)
0.35–0.40	Normal saturation dive PO_{2} level
0.50	Threshold for whole-body effects; maximum saturation dive exposure
1.0–1.20	Common range for recreational closed circuit set point
1.40	Recommended limit for recreational open circuit bottom sector
1.60	NOAA limit for maximum exposure for a working diver Recreational/technical limit for decompression
2.20	Commercial/military "Sur-D" chamber surface decompression on 100% O_{2} at 12 msw (meters of sea water)
2.40	40% O_{2} nitrox recompression treatment gas for use in the chamber at 50 msw
2.80	100% O_{2} recompression treatment gas for use in the chamber at 18 msw
3.00	50% O_{2} nitrox recompression treatment gas for use in the chamber at 50 msw

=== Endurance ===
The endurance of a rebreather, the duration for which it can be safely and comfortably used, is dependent on the oxygen supply at the oxygen consumption rate of the user, and the capacity of the scrubber to remove carbon dioxide at the rate it is produced by the user. These variables are closely linked, as the carbon dioxide is a product of metabolic oxygen consumption, though not the only product. This is independent of depth, except for work of breathing increase due to gas density increase.

== Architecture ==
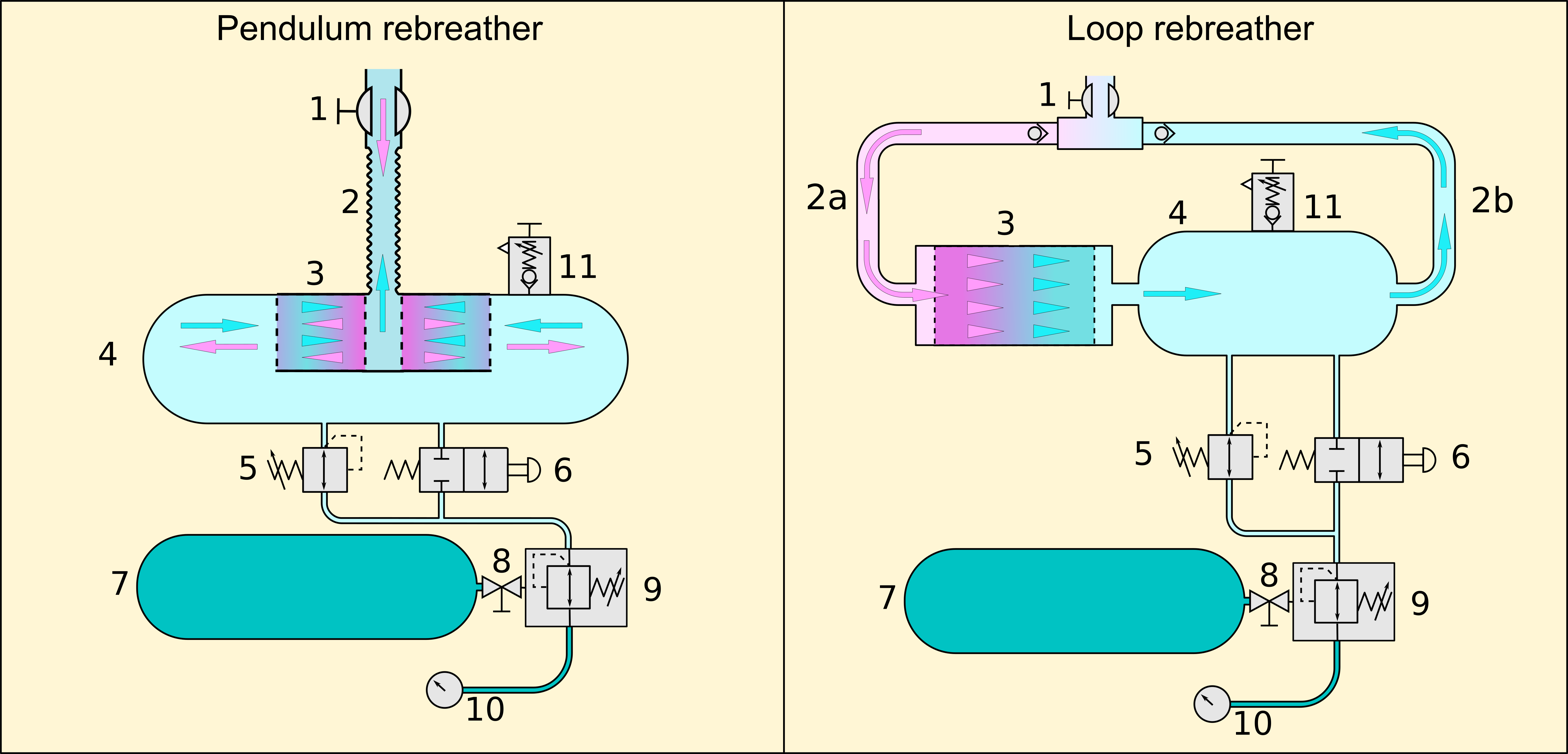
Comparison of pendulum and loop rebreather architecture: 1 Mouthpiece with dive/surface valve; 2 Two way breathing hose; 2a Exhalation hose with non-return valve; 2b Inhalation hose with non-return valve; 3 Scrubber; 4 Counterlung; 5 Automatic make-up valve; 6 Manual bypass valve; 7 Breathing gas storage cylinder; 8 Cylinder valve; 9 Regulator first stage; 10 Cylinder pressure gauge; 11 Over-pressure valve

There are two basic arrangements controlling the flow of breathing gas inside the rebreather, known as the pendulum and loop systems.

=== Pendulum ===
In the pendulum configuration, the user inhales gas from the counterlung through a breathing hose, and exhaled gas returns to the counterlung by flowing back through the same hose. The scrubber is usually between the breathing hose and the counterlung bag, and gas flow is bi-directional. All of the flow passages between the user and the active absorbent in the scrubber are dead space – volume containing gas which is rebreathed without modification by the rebreather. The dead space increases as the absorbent is depleted. Breathing hose volume must be minimised to limit dead space.

=== Loop ===
In the loop configuration, the user inhales gas through one hose, and exhales through a second hose. Exhaled gas flows into the scrubber from one side, and exits at the other side. There may be one large counterlung, on either side of the scrubber, or two smaller counterlungs, one on each side of the scrubber. Flow is in one direction, enforced by non-return valves, which are usually in the breathing hoses where they join the mouthpiece. Only the flow passage in the mouthpiece before the split between inhalation and exhalation hoses is dead space, and this is not affected by hose volume.

== Components ==
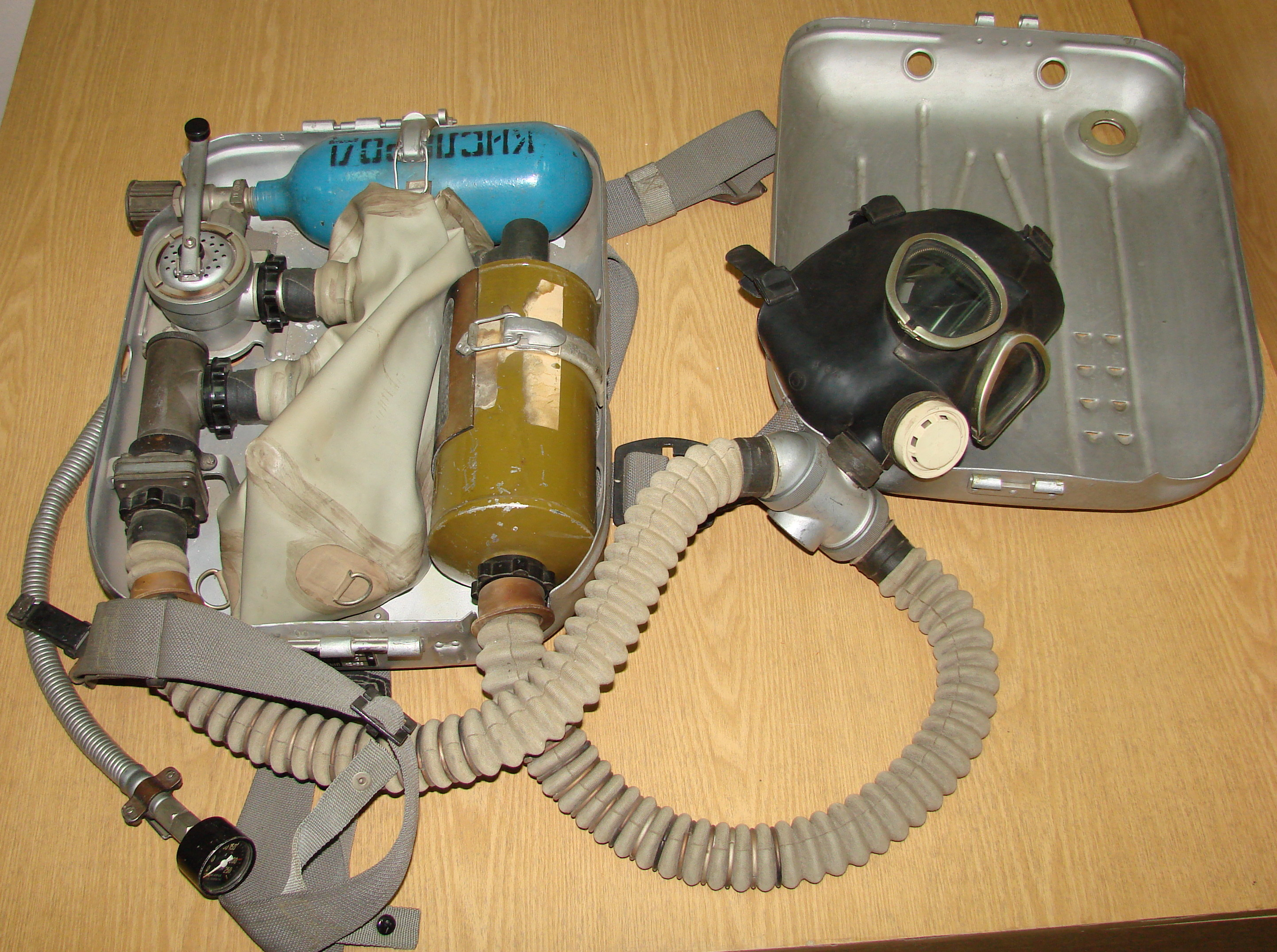
Oxygen rebreather KIP-8 interior showing the basic components

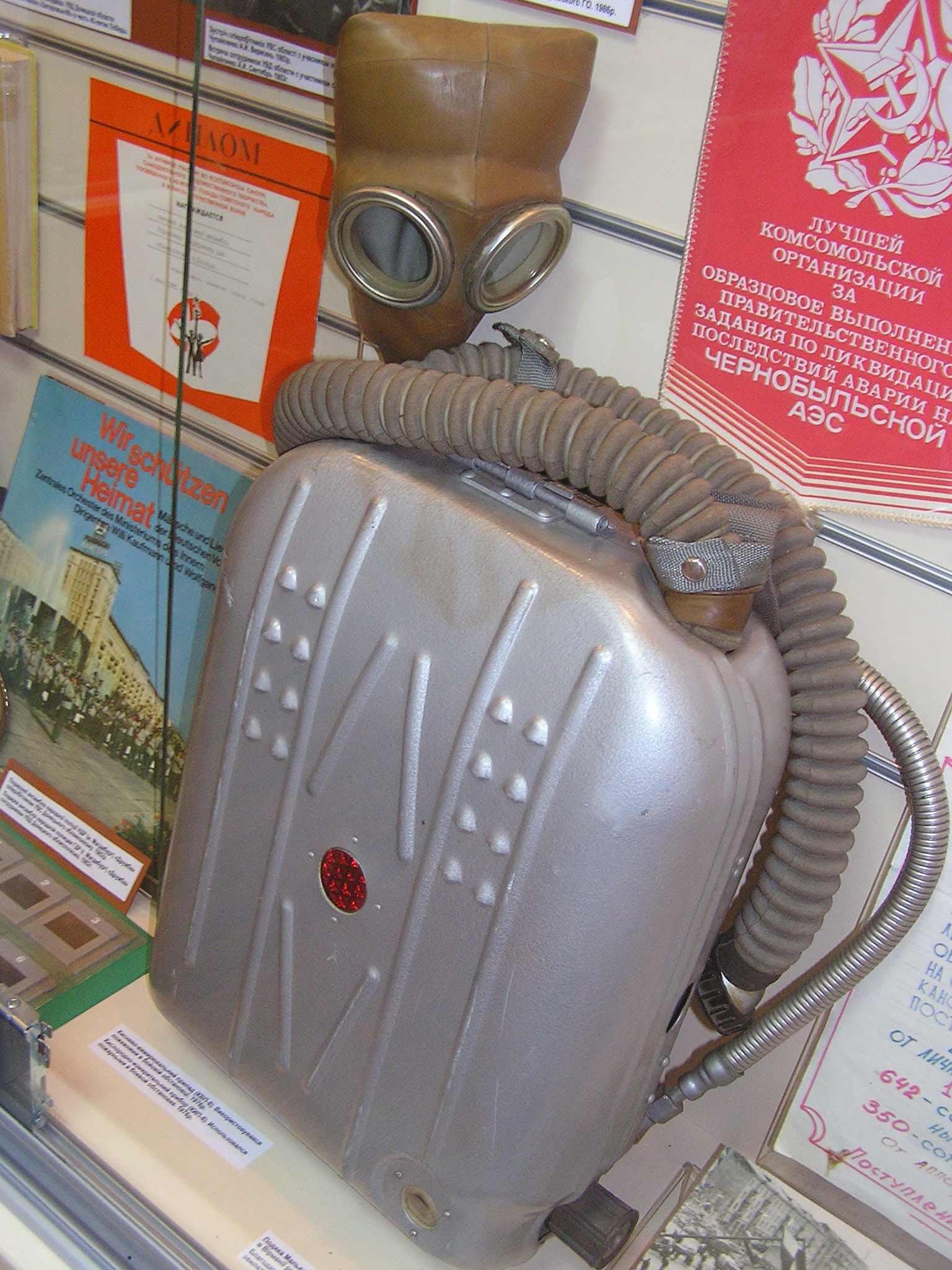
Russian firefighting rebreather KIP-8 exterior

There are some components that are common to almost all personal portable rebreathers. These include the ambient pressure breathing volume components, usually called the breathing loop in a circulating flow rebreather, and the make-up gas supply and control system.

=== Counterlung ===
The counterlung is an airtight bag of strong flexible material that holds the volume of the exhaled gas until it is inhaled again. There may be a single counterlung, or one on each side of the scrubber, which allows a more even flow rate of gas through the scrubber, which can reduce work of breathing and improve scrubber efficiency by a more consistent dwell time.

=== Scrubber ===
The scrubber is a container filled with carbon dioxide absorbent material, mostly strong bases, through which the exhaled gas passes to remove the carbon dioxide. The absorbent may be granular or in the form of a moulded cartridge. Granular absorbent may be manufactured by breaking up lumps of lime and sorting the granules by size, or by moulding granules at a consistent size and shape. Gas flow through the scrubber may be in one direction in a loop rebreather, or both ways in a pendulum rebreather. The scrubber canister generally has an inlet on one side and an outlet on the other side.

A typical absorbent is soda lime, which is made up of calcium hydroxide Ca(OH)_{2}, and sodium hydroxide NaOH. The main component of soda lime is calcium hydroxide, which is relatively cheap and easily available. Other components may be present in the absorbent. Sodium hydroxide is added to accelerate the reaction with carbon dioxide. Other chemicals may be added to prevent unwanted decomposition products when used with standard halogenated inhalation anaesthetics. An indicator may be included to show when carbon dioxide has dissolved in the water of the soda lime and formed carbonic acid, changing the pH from basic to acid, as the change of colour shows that the absorbent has reached saturation with carbon dioxide and must be changed.

The carbon dioxide combines with water or water vapor to produce a weak carbonic acid: CO_{2} + H_{2}O –> H_{2}CO_{3}. This reacts with the hydroxides to produce carbonates and water in an exothermic reaction. In the intermediate reaction, the carbonic acid reacts exothermically with sodium hydroxide to form sodium carbonate and water: H_{2}CO_{3} + 2NaOH –> Na_{2}CO_{3} + 2H_{2}O + heat. In the final reaction, the sodium carbonate reacts with the slaked lime (calcium hydroxide) to form calcium carbonate and sodium hydroxide: Na_{2}CO_{3} + Ca(OH)_{2} –> CaCO_{3} + 2NaOH. The sodium hydroxide is then available again to react with more carbonic acid. 100 grams (3.5 oz) of this absorbent can remove about 15 to 25 litres (0.53 to 0.88 cu ft) of carbon dioxide at standard atmospheric pressure. This process also heats and humidifies the air, which is desirable for diving in cold water, or climbing at high altitudes, but not for working in hot environments.

Other reactions may be used in special circumstances. Lithium hydroxide and particularly lithium peroxide may be used where low mass is important, such as in space stations and space suits. Lithium peroxide also replenishes the oxygen during the scrubbing reaction.

Another method of carbon dioxide removal occasionally used in portable rebreathers is to freeze it out, which is possible in a cryogenic rebreather which uses liquid oxygen. The liquid oxygen absorbs heat from the carbon dioxide in a heat exchanger to convert the oxygen to gas, which is sufficient to freeze the carbon dioxide. This process also chills the gas, which is sometimes, but not always, desirable.

=== Breathing hoses ===
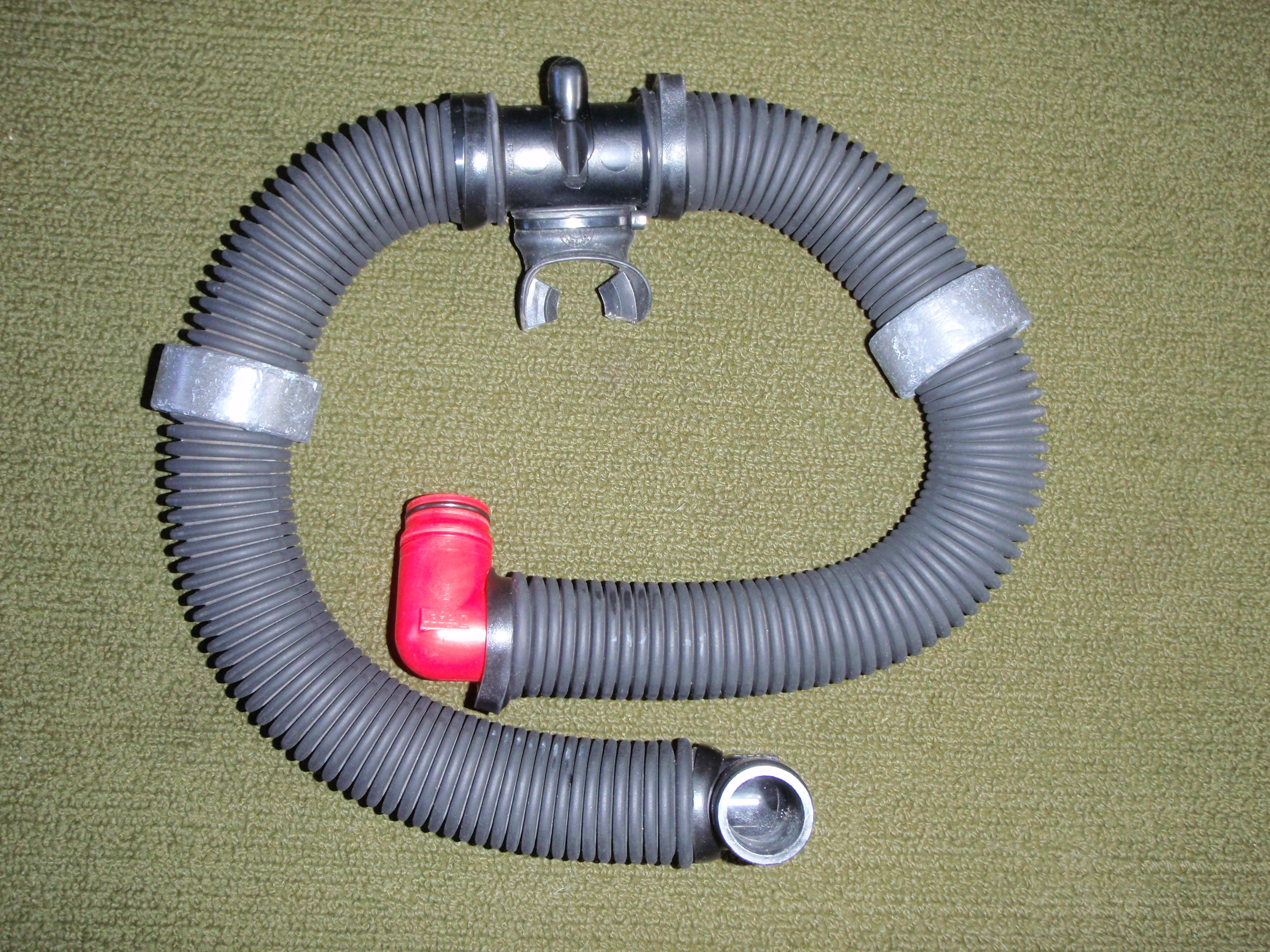
Draeger Ray dive/surface valve with bite grip scuba mouthpiece, non-return valves, and breathing hoses

A breathing hose or sometimes breathing tube on a rebreather is a flexible tube for breathing gas to pass through at ambient pressure. They are distinguished from the low-, intermediate-, and high-pressure hoses which may also be parts of rebreather apparatus. They have a wide enough bore to minimise flow resistance at the ambient pressure in the operational range for the equipment, are usually circular in cross section, and may be corrugated to let the user's head move about without the tube collapsing at kinks.

Each end has an airtight connection to the adjacent component, and they may contain a one-way valve to keep the gas circulating the right way in a loop system. Depending on the service, they may be made of a flexible polymer, an elastomer, a fibre or cloth reinforced elastomer, or elastomer covered with a woven fabric for reinforcement or abrasion resistance. If the woven layer is bonded to the outside surface it protects the rubber from damage from scrapes but makes it more difficult to wash off contaminants. Breathing hoses typically come in two types of corrugation. Annular corrugations, as depicted in the photo, benefit from easier field repair in case of a tear or hole, while helical corrugations allow efficient drainage after cleaning.

Breathing hoses are usually long enough to connect the apparatus to the user's head in all attitudes of their head, but should not be unnecessarily long, which will cause additional weight, hydrodynamic drag, risk snagging on things, or contain excess dead space in a pendulum rebreather. Breathing hoses can be tethered down to a diver's shoulders or ballasted for neutral buoyancy to minimise loads on the mouthpiece.

=== Mouthpiece or facemask ===
A mouthpiece with bite-grip, an oro-nasal mask, a full-face mask, or a sealed helmet is provided so that the user can breathe from the unit hands-free.

=== Oxygen supply ===
A store of oxygen, usually as compressed gas in a high pressure cylinder, but sometimes as liquid oxygen, that feeds gaseous oxygen into the ambient pressure breathing volume, either continuously, or when the user operates the oxygen addition valve, or via a demand valve in an oxygen rebreather, when the volume of gas in the breathing circuit becomes low and the pressure drops, or in an electronically controlled mixed gas rebreather, after a sensor has detected insufficient oxygen partial pressure, and activates a solenoid valve.

=== Valves ===
Valves are needed to control gas flow in the breathing volume, and gas feed from the storage container. They include:

- Non-return valves in the breathing loop of loop rebreathers, which enforce one-directional flow to minimise dead space,
- Dive/surface valves on diving rebreathers, which prevent water from entering the breathing volume when the mouthpiece is removed, or the user elects to breathe ambient air at the surface.
- Gas supply valves, including a cylinder valve, to allow high pressure gas to flow from the cylinder. This may be manually operated by the user to directly supply make-up gas, or may provide the gas to a pressure regulator which reduces the pressure to a few bar above ambient pressure, and supplies this intermediate pressure gas to the gas feed system, which may contain one or more of:
  - Manually operated feed valve,
  - Constant mass flow orifice or needle valve, to provide a continuous feed,
  - Demand valve which automatically adds gas when the volume of the counterlung(s) is too low, and pressure in the breathing volume drops below ambient pressure.
- Overpressure valve, to release excess gas. This is mainly used in diving rebreathers to compensate for expansion during ascent. Excess gas may also be vented past the skirt seal of a full-face mask, or through the nose when a mouthpiece is used.

=== Oxygen sensors ===
Oxygen sensors may be used to monitor partial pressure of oxygen in mixed gas rebreathers to ensure that it does not fall outside the safe limits, but are generally not used on oxygen rebreathers, as the oxygen content is fixed at 100%, and its partial pressure varies only with the ambient pressure.

== System variants ==
Rebreathers can be primarily categorised as diving rebreathers, intended for hyperbaric use, and other rebreathers used at pressures from slightly more than normal atmospheric pressure at sea level to significantly lower ambient pressure at high altitudes and in space. Diving rebreathers must often deal with the complications of avoiding hyperbaric oxygen toxicity, while normobaric and hypobaric applications can use the relatively trivially simple oxygen rebreather technology, where there is no requirement to monitor oxygen partial pressure during use providing the ambient pressure is sufficient.

Rebreathers can also be subdivided by functional principle as closed circuit and semi-closed circuit rebreathers.

- Closed circuit rebreather: A closed circuit rebreather adds oxygen to the loop gas to make up for oxygen used by metabolic processes. These processes do not use diluent gas, so none is added unless the volume of the loop is reduced for other reasons, such as intentional dumping, flushing, or an ambient pressure change. Gas is dumped from the loop when it expands during a pressure reduction, or too much is added.
- Semi-closed circuit rebreather, also known as a gas extender: A semi-closed circuit rebreather either dumps some loop gas nearly constantly or constantly adds gas to the loop, and consequently needs an inflow of both diluent and oxygen to make up the volume. Changes in ambient pressure also require changes in the number (mass) of gas in the loop to maintain the working volume.

=== Oxygen rebreathers ===
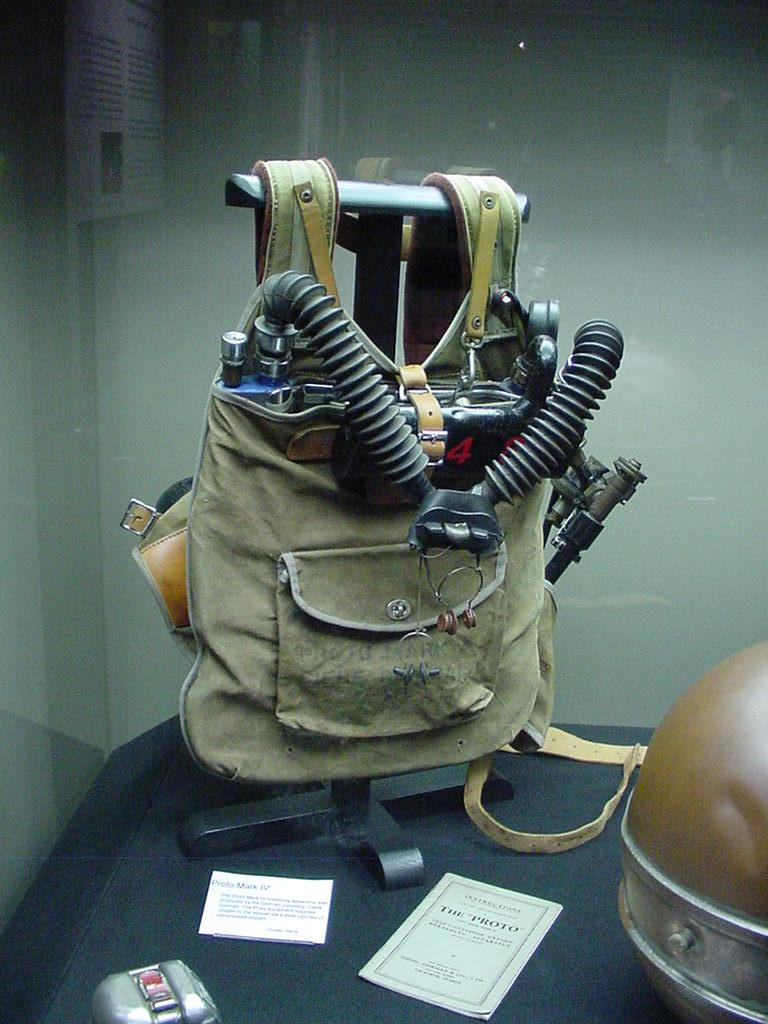
Siebe Gorman Proto 1 mine rescue rebreather, a simple oxygen rebreather.

This is the earliest type of rebreather and was commonly used by navies for submarine escape and shallow water diving work, for mine rescue, high altitude mountaineering and flight, and in industrial applications from the early twentieth century. Oxygen rebreathers can be remarkably simple and mechanically reliable, and they were invented before open-circuit scuba. They only supply oxygen, so there is no requirement to control the gas composition other than removing the carbon dioxide.

==== Oxygen feed options ====
In some rebreathers the oxygen cylinder has oxygen supply mechanisms in parallel. One is constant flow; the other is a manual on-off valve called a bypass valve; both feed into the same hose which feeds the counterlung. Others are supplied via a demand valve on the counterlung. This will add gas at any time that the counterlung is emptied and the diver continues to inhale. Oxygen can also be added manually by a button which activates the demand valve. Some simple oxygen rebreathers had no automatic supply system, but only the manual feed valve, and the diver had to operate the valve at intervals to refill the breathing bag as the volume of oxygen decreased below a comfortable level.

=== Mixed gas rebreathers ===
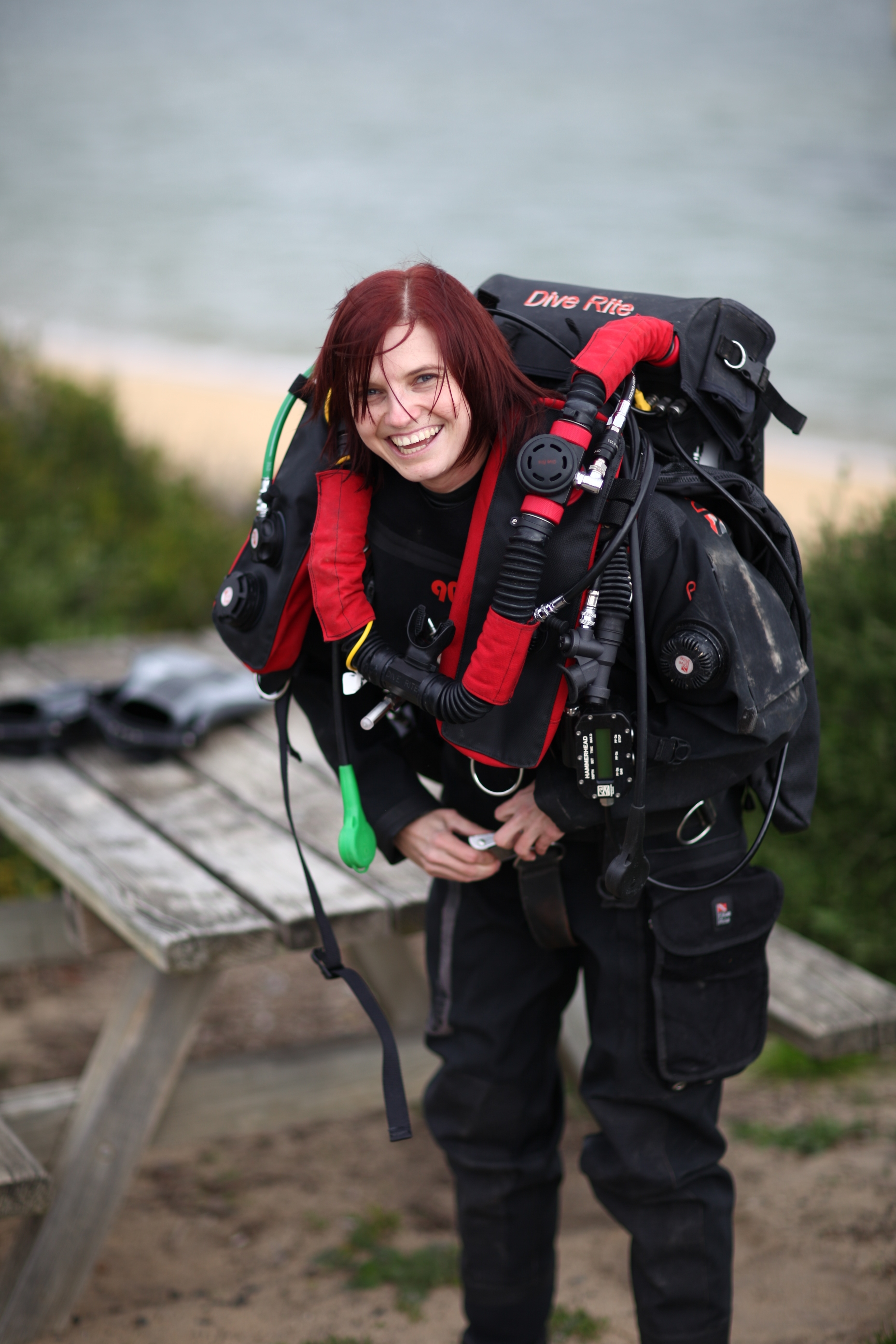
Mixed gas electronically controlled closed circuit diving rebreather

All rebreathers other than oxygen rebreathers may be considered mixed gas rebreathers, as the breathing gas is a mixture of oxygen and metabolically inactive diluent gas. These can be divided into semi-closed circuit, where the supply gas is a breathable mixture containing oxygen and inert diluents, usually nitrogen and helium, and which is replenished by adding more of the mixture as the oxygen is used up, sufficient to maintain a breathable partial pressure of oxygen in the loop, and closed circuit rebreathers, where two parallel gas supplies are used: the diluent, to provide the bulk of the gas, and which is recycled, and oxygen, which is metabolically expended. Carbon dioxide is considered a waste product, and in a correctly functioning rebreather, is effectively removed when the gas passes through the scrubber.

=== Rebreathers using an absorbent that releases oxygen ===
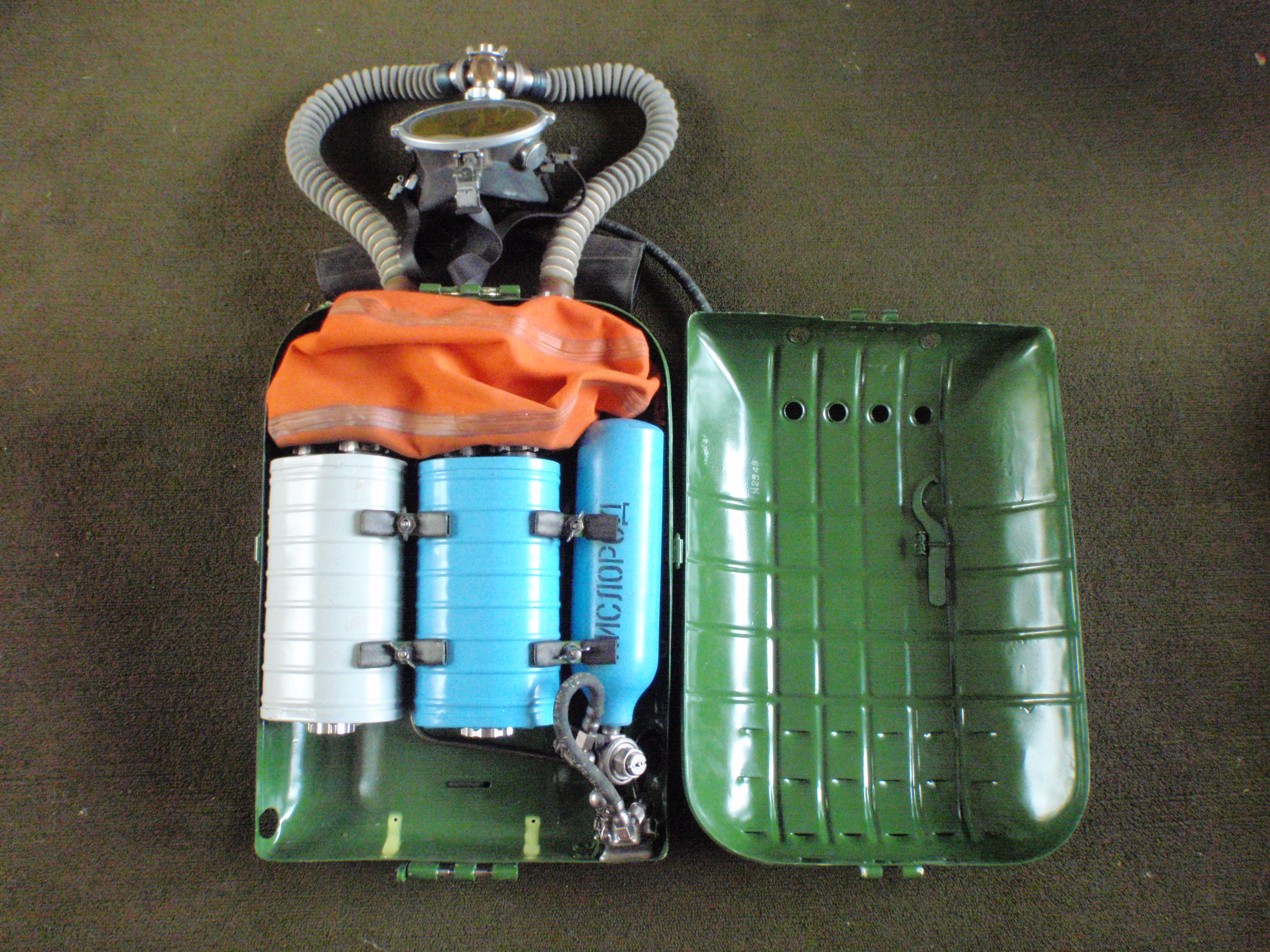
Russian multipurpose rebreather IDA-71 with lid of casing opened showing interior – one of the scrubber canisters can optionally be filled with superoxide.

There have been a few rebreather designs (e.g. the Oxylite) which use potassium superoxide, which gives off oxygen as it absorbs carbon dioxide, as the carbon dioxide absorbent: 4KO_{2} + 2CO_{2} = 2K_{2}CO_{3} + 3O_{2}. A small volume oxygen cylinder is needed to fill and purge the loop at the start of use. This technology may be applied to both oxygen and mixed gas rebreathers, and can be used for diving and other applications. Potassium superoxide reacts vigorously with liquid water, releasing considerable heat and oxygen, causing a fire hazard, so the more successful applications have been for space suits, fire-fighting, and mine rescue.

=== Rebreathers which use liquid oxygen ===
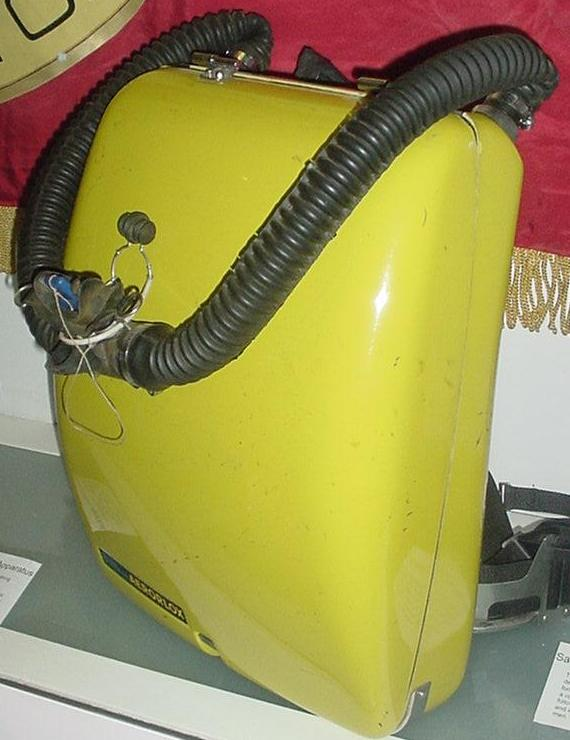
Aerorlox liquid oxygen rebreather in a coal mining museum

A liquid oxygen supply can be used for oxygen or mixed gas rebreathers. If used underwater, the liquid-oxygen container must be well insulated against heat transfer from the water. Industrial sets of this type may not be suitable for diving, and diving sets of this type may not be suitable for use out of water due to conflicting heat transfer requirements. The set's liquid oxygen tank must be filled immediately before use. Examples of the type include:

- Blackett's Aerophor
- Aerorlox

==== Cryogenic rebreather ====
A cryogenic rebreather removes the carbon dioxide by freezing it out in a "snow box" by the low temperature produced as liquid oxygen evaporates to replace the oxygen used.

== Fields of application ==
- Underwater – as a self-contained breathing apparatus, where it is sometimes known as "closed circuit scuba" as opposed to "open circuit scuba" where the diver exhales breathing gas into the surrounding water. Surface-supplied diving equipment may incorporate rebreather technology either as a gas reclaim system, where the surface-supplied breathing gas is returned and scrubbed at the surface, or as a gas extender carried by the diver. Rebreathers may also be used as self-contained diver bailout systems for either scuba or surface-supplied diving.
- Mine rescue and other industrial applications – where poisonous gases may be present or oxygen may be absent.
- Fire fighting, where personnel may be required to operate in an atmosphere immediately dangerous to life and health for longer periods than open-circuit Self-contained breathing apparatus (SCBA) can provide air.
- Crewed spacecraft and space suits – outer space is, effectively, a vacuum without oxygen to support life.
- Himalayan or high-altitude mountaineering. High altitude reduces the partial pressure of oxygen in the ambient air, which reduces the ability of the climber to function effectively. Mountaineering rebreathers are closed-circuit oxygen sets that provide a higher partial pressure of oxygen to the climber than the ambient air.
- Medical anaesthesia breathing systems – to supply controlled concentrations of anaesthetic gases to patients without contaminating the air that the staff breathe, and to conserve anaesthetic gas.
- Life-support systems of submarines, underwater habitats, and saturation diving systems use a scrubber system working on the same principles as a rebreather.

This may be compared with some applications of open-circuit breathing apparatus:

- The oxygen enrichment systems primarily used by medical patients, high altitude mountaineers and commercial aircraft emergency systems, in which the user breathes ambient air which is enriched by the addition of pure oxygen,
- Open circuit breathing apparatus used by firefighters, underwater divers and some mountaineers, which supplies fresh gas for each breath, which is then discharged into the environment.
- Gas masks and respirators which filter contaminants from ambient air which is then breathed.

=== Diving rebreathers ===
SIVA Underwater Mine Countermeasures (MCM) Diving Apparatus (oxygen rebreather)

The widest variety of rebreather types is used in diving, as the consequences of breathing under pressure complicate the requirements, and a large range of options are available depending on the specific application and available budget. A diving rebreather is safety-critical life-support equipment – some modes of failure can kill the diver without warning, others can require immediate appropriate response for survival.

==== Surface supplied diving gas reclaim systems ====
A helium reclaim system (or push-pull system) is used to recover helium based breathing gas after use by the diver when this is more economical than losing it to the environment in open circuit systems. The recovered gas is passed through a scrubber system to remove carbon dioxide, filtered to remove odours, and pressurised into storage containers, where it may be mixed with oxygen to the required composition for re-use, either immediately, or at a later date.

==== Saturation diving life-support systems ====
The life support system provides breathing gas and other services to support life for the personnel under pressure in the accommodation chambers and closed diving bell. It includes the following components:

- Breathing gas supply, distribution and recycling equipment: scrubbers, filters, boosters, compressors, mixing, monitoring, and storage facilities
- Chamber climate control system – control of temperature and humidity, and filtration of gas
- Instrumentation, control, monitoring and communications equipment
- Fire suppression systems
- Sanitation systems

The life support system for the bell provides and monitors the main supply of breathing gas, and the control station monitors the deployment and communications with the divers. Primary gas supply, power and communications to the bell are through a bell umbilical, made up from a number of hoses and electrical cables twisted together and deployed as a unit. This is extended to the divers through the diver umbilicals.

The accommodation life support system maintains the chamber environment within the acceptable range for health and comfort of the occupants. Temperature, humidity, breathing gas quality, sanitation systems, and equipment function are monitored and controlled.

=== Atmospheric diving suits ===
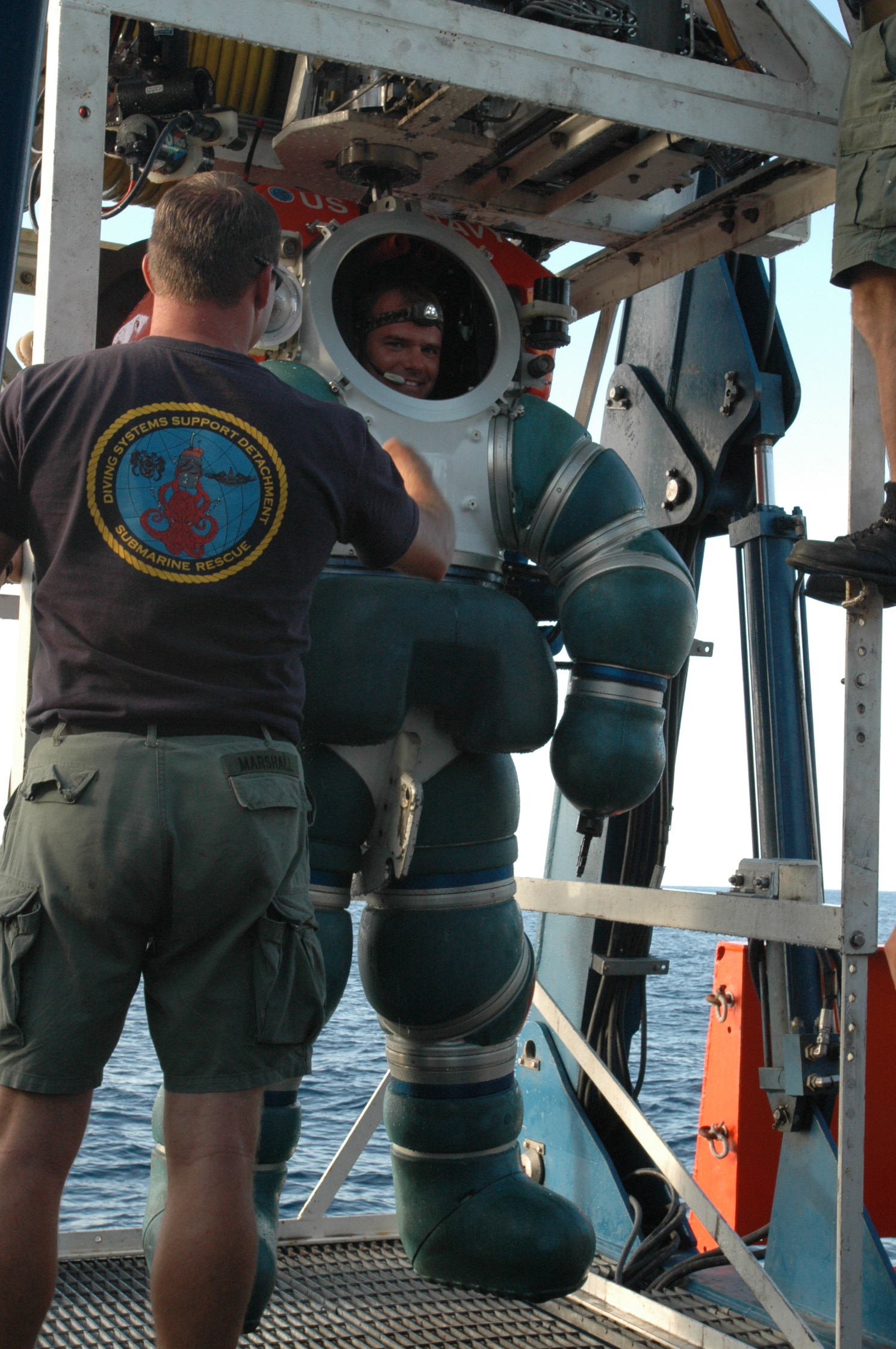
US Navy atmospheric diving suit

An atmospheric diving suit is a small one-man articulated submersible of roughly anthropomorphic form, with limb joints which allow articulation under external pressure while maintaining an internal pressure of one atmosphere. Breathing gas supply may be surface supplied by umbilical, or from a rebreather carried on the suit. An emergency gas supply rebreather may also be fitted to a suit with either surface supply or rebreather for primary breathing gas. As the internal pressure is maintained at one atmosphere, there is no risk of acute oxygen toxicity. This is an underwater diving application, but has more in common with industrial applications than with ambient pressure scuba rebreathers.

=== Industrial and rescue self-contained rebreathers ===
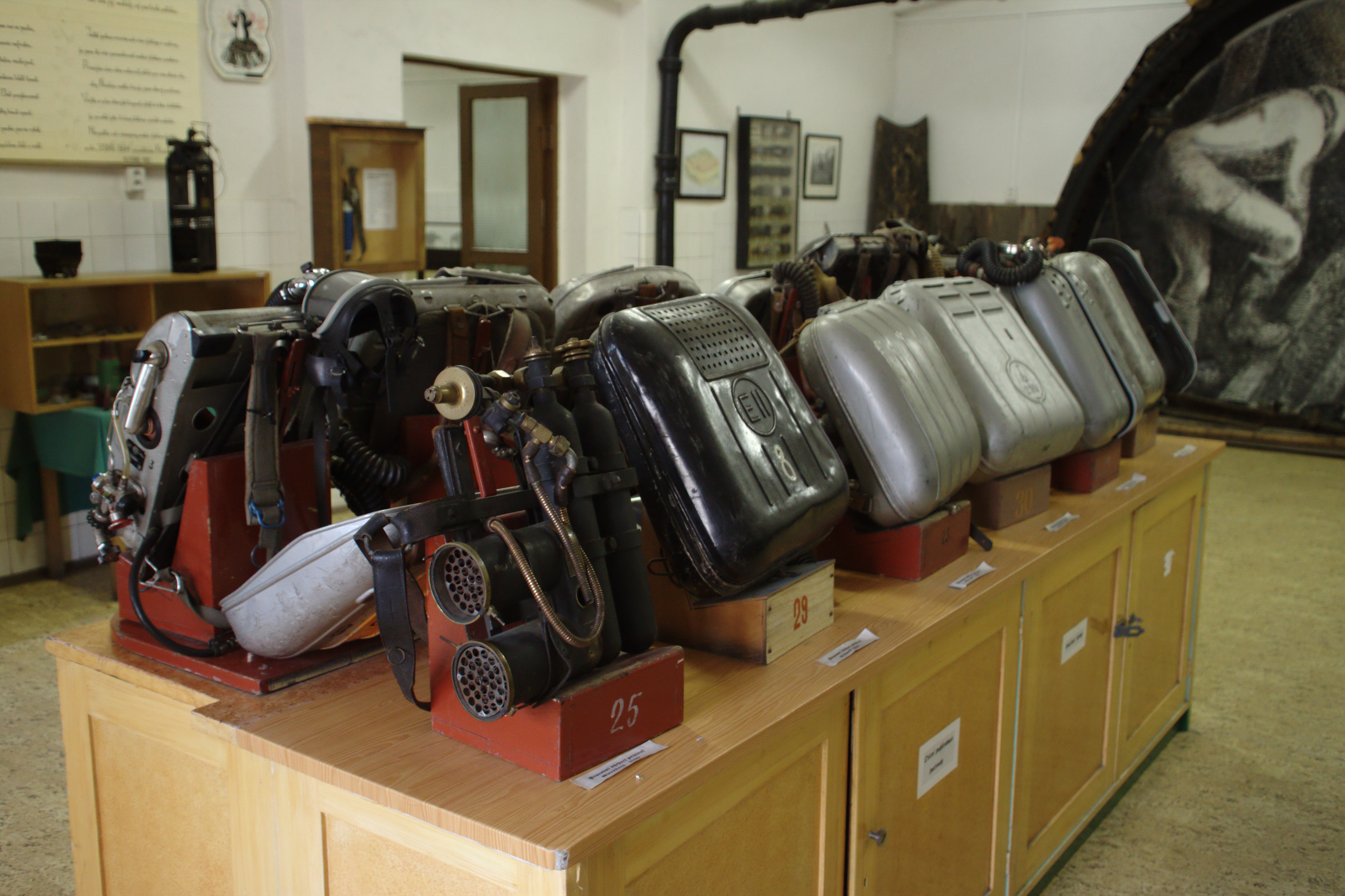
Mine rescue rebreathers in a Czech museum

Different design criteria apply to SCBA rebreathers for use only out of the water:

- There is no variation in ambient pressure on the components. The counterlung may be placed for comfort and convenience.
- Cooling of the gas in the breathing loop may be desirable, as the absorbent produces heat as it reacts with carbon dioxide, and the warming of the gas is not welcome in hot industrial situations such as firefighting and deep mines.
- Absorbent containers may in some cases rely on gravity for preventing channeling.
- If a full-face mask is used, it may have viewports designed for convenience or improved field of vision, and they do not need to be flat and parallel to prevent visual distortion as when underwater.
- In firefighting rebreathers, consideration must be given to making the set reasonably flame-proof and protecting it from heat and debris impacts.
- The need to ditch the set quickly may not arise, and harness straps may not need a quick-release.
- Buoyancy is not a consideration, but weight may be critical. Good ergonomic design for ease of carrying, comfort, and balance are important where the unit may be worn in confined spaces, while climbing and crawling through small gaps.
- A spring loaded counterlung pressurisation system may be used to provide slight positive pressure in the breathing loop, to prevent noxious gas entry if the mask seal is not perfect.
- There are no constraints due to the physiological effects of breathing under pressure. Complex gas mixtures are unnecessary. Oxygen rebreathers can usually be used, which makes the design considerably simpler, and the mechanism more reliable.
- A system allowing the user to access drinking water from a bag may be fitted, A bite operated valve van be used to control flow.
- Radio voice communications may be fitted.
- A constant mass flow system may be used to ensure a minimum fresh gas supply, with a demand valve to add gas if the loop is emptied.
- Gas supply and absorbent duration would usually be matched for efficiency
- Insulation may be needed for the breathing loop for use in sub-zero temperatures where freezing of the absorbent would reduce its effectiveness.
- A water trap may be provided to collect condensed water from the absorbent reaction and from metabolic product.
- Monitoring functions may include:
  - Cylinder pressure (analog and digital)
  - Estimated remaining duration of use until residual low pressure warning is activated
  - Temperature indication
  - Automatic recording of warning signals
- Optical and/or acoustic warning signals may be provided for:
  - Low gas pressure in the cylinder
  - Alarm triggered by lack of user movement
  - Manually triggered alarm.

=== Mountaineering rebreathers ===
Mountaineering rebreathers provide oxygen at a higher concentration than available from atmospheric air in a naturally hypoxic environment. They need to be lightweight and to be reliable in severe cold including not getting choked with deposited frost. A high rate of system failures due to extreme cold has not been solved. Breathing pure oxygen results in an elevated partial pressure of oxygen in the blood: a climber breathing pure oxygen at the summit of Mount Everest has a greater oxygen partial pressure than breathing air at sea level. This results in being able to exert greater physical effort at altitude. The exothermic reaction helps keep the scrubber contents from freezing, and helps reduce heat loss from the user.

Both chemical and compressed gas oxygen have been used in experimental closed-circuit oxygen systems – the first on Mount Everest in 1938. The 1953 expedition used closed-circuit oxygen equipment developed by Tom Bourdillon and his father for the first assault team of Bourdillon and Evans; with one "dural" 800l compressed oxygen cylinder and soda lime canister (the second (successful) assault team of Hillary and Tenzing used open-circuit equipment).

=== Rebreathers for unpressurised aircraft and high altitude parachuting ===
Similar requirement and working environment to mountaineering, but weight is less of a problem. The Soviet IDA71 rebreather was also manufactured in a high altitude version, which was operated as an oxygen rebreather.

=== Anaesthesia systems ===
Anaesthetic machines can be configured as rebreathers to provide oxygen and anaesthetic gases to a patient during surgery or other procedures that require sedation. An absorbent is present in the machine to remove the carbon dioxide from the loop.

Both semi-closed and fully closed circuit systems may be used for anaesthetic machines, and both push-pull (pendulum) two directional flow and one directional loop systems are used. The breathing circuit of a loop configured machine has two unidirectional valves so that only scrubbed gas flows to the patient while expired gas goes back to the machine.

The anaesthetic machine can also provide gas to ventilated patients who cannot breathe on their own. A waste gas scavenging system removes any gasses from the operating room to avoid environmental contamination.

=== Space suits ===
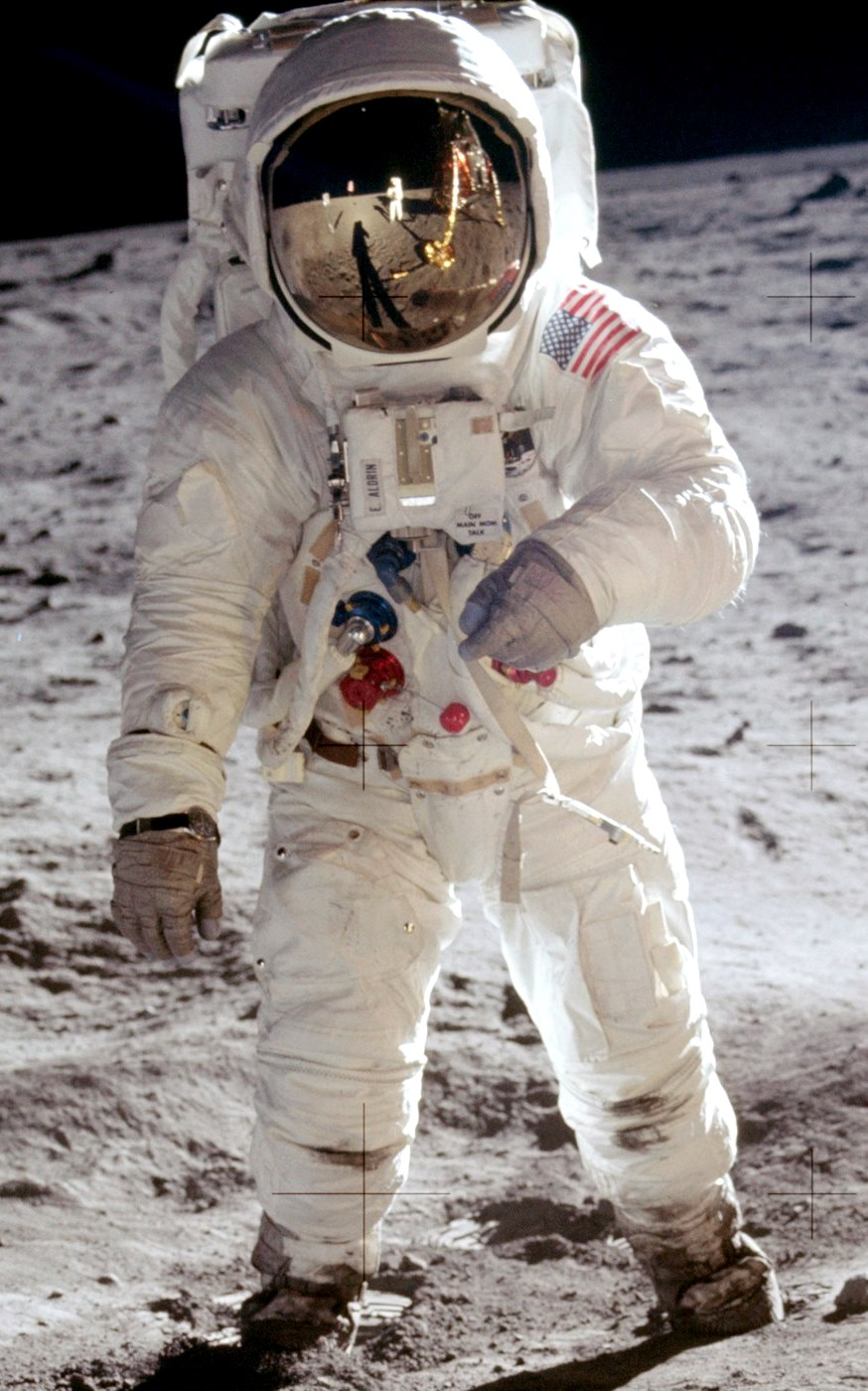
Buzz Aldrin on the Moon on the 1969 Apollo 11 mission, showing the portable life support system.

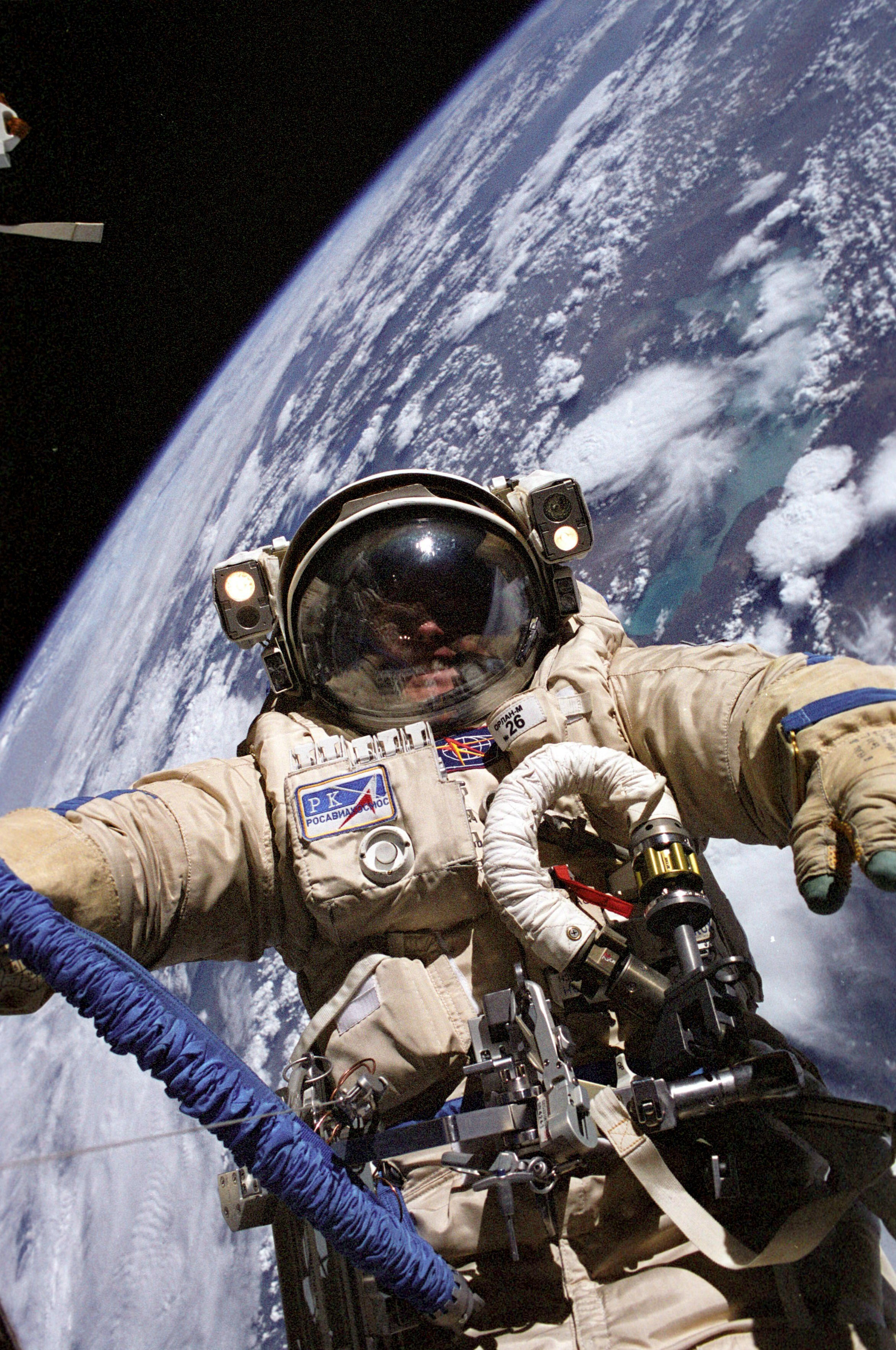
Orlan space suit on an EVA from the International Space Station, with the life-support umbilical in view.

One of the functions of a space suit is to provide the wearer with breathing gas. This can be done via an umbilical from the life-support systems of the spacecraft or habitat, or from a primary life support system carried on the suit. Both of these systems involve rebreather technology as they both remove carbon dioxide from the breathing gas and add oxygen to compensate for oxygen used by the wearer. Space suits usually use oxygen rebreathers as this allows a lower pressure in the suit which gives the wearer better freedom of movement.

=== Habitat life-support systems ===
Submarines, underwater habitats, bomb shelters, space stations, and other living spaces occupied by several people over medium to long periods on a limited gas supply, are equivalent to closed circuit rebreathers in principle, but generally rely on mechanical circulation of breathing gas through the scrubbers.

== Safety ==
There are several safety issues with rebreather equipment, and these tend to be more severe in diving rebreathers.

=== Hazards ===
Some of the hazards are due to the way the equipment works, while others are related to the environment in which the equipment is used, as rebreathers are usually used where no breathable ambient atmosphere is available.

==== Hypoxia ====
Hypoxia can occur in any rebreather which contains enough inert gas to allow breathing without triggering automatic gas addition.

In an oxygen rebreather this can occur if the loop is not sufficiently purged at the start of use. Purging is the replacement of the original gas content by fresh gas, and may have to be repeated to completely remove inert gas. Purging should be done while breathing off the unit so that the inert gas in the user's lungs and body tissues that finds its way into the loop is also removed from the system.

==== Carbon dioxide buildup ====
Carbon dioxide buildup will occur if the scrubber medium is absent, badly packed, inadequate or exhausted. The normal human body is fairly sensitive to carbon dioxide partial pressure, and a buildup will be noticed by the user. However, there is not often much that can be done to rectify the problem except changing to another breathing gas supply until the scrubber can be repacked. Continued use of a rebreather with an ineffective scrubber is not possible for very long, as the levels will become toxic and the user will experience extreme respiratory distress, ultimately leading to loss of consciousness and death. The rate at which these problems develop depends on the volume of the circuit and the metabolic rate of the user at the time.

Carbon dioxide buildup can also occur when a combination of exertion and work of breathing exceeds the capacity of the user. If this occurs where the user cannot reduce exertion sufficiently, it may be impossible to correct. This problem is more likely to occur with diving rebreathers at depths where the density of the breathing gas is severely elevated. The only recourse is to vent the expelled breath outside the closed system, therefore not reusing the oxygen, and thereby increasing use of the gas mixture, but this is not an option in every field of application.

==== Leakage of toxic gases into the breathing loop ====
Industrial rebreathers are often used where the ambient air is contaminated and may be toxic. Parts of the loop will be at a slightly lower than external ambient pressure during inhalation, and if the circuit is not airtight external gases may leak in. This is a particular issue around the edge of a full-face mask, where the rubber mask skirt must seal against the user's face.

==== Fire hazards of high concentration of oxygen ====
High partial pressures of oxygen greatly increase fire hazard, and many materials which are self-extinguishing in atmospheric air will burn continuously in a high oxygen concentration. This is more of a hazard for terrestrial applications such as rescue and firefighting than for diving, where the ignition risk is relatively low.

==== Caustic cocktail ====
Caused by a loop flood reaching the absorbent canister, so only applicable in immersed applications.

=== Failure modes ===
==== Scrubber failure ====
The term "break-through" means the failure of the scrubber to continue removing sufficient carbon dioxide from the gas circulating in the loop. This will inevitably happen if the scrubber is used too long, but can happen prematurely in some circumstances. There are several ways that the scrubber may fail or become less efficient:

- Complete consumption of the active ingredient in a "general break through". Depending on scrubber design and user workload, this may be gradual, allowing the user to become aware of the problem in time to make a controlled exit or bailout to open circuit, or relatively sudden, triggering an urgent or emergency response.
- Bypassing the absorbent. The absorbent granules must be packed closely so that all exhaled gas comes into contact with the surface of soda lime and the canister is designed to avoid any large spaces or gaps between the absorbent granules or between the granules and the canister walls that would let gas bypass contact with the absorbent. If any of the seals, such as O-rings, or spacers that prevent bypassing of the scrubber, are not present or not fitted properly, or if the scrubber canister has been incorrectly packed or fitted, it may allow the exhaled gas to bypass the absorbent, and the scrubber will be less effective. This failure mode is also called "tunneling" when absorbent settles to form void spaces inside the canister. Bypass will cause an unexpected early break-through.
- When the gas mix is under pressure at depth, the gas molecules are more densely packed, and the carbon dioxide molecules' mean path between collisions is shorter, so they are not so free to move around to reach the absorbent surface, and require a longer dwell time. Because of this effect, the scrubber must be bigger for deep diving than is needed for a shallow-water, industrial or high altitude rebreather.
- Carbon dioxide absorbent can be caustic and can cause burns to the eyes, mucous membranes and skin. A mixture of water and absorbent occurs when the scrubber floods and depending on the chemicals used, can produce a chalky taste or a burning sensation if the contaminated water reaches the mouthpiece, which should prompt the diver to switch to an alternative source of breathing gas and rinse their mouth out with water. This is known to rebreather divers as a caustic cocktail. The excessive wetting of the absorbent also reduces the rate of carbon dioxide removal and can cause premature break-through even if no caustic liquid reaches the diver. Work of breathing may also increase. Many modern diving rebreather absorbents are designed not to produce this caustic fluid if they get wet.
- In below-freezing operation (primarily mountain climbing), wet scrubber chemicals can freeze when oxygen bottles are changed, while there is a pause in the exothermic reaction of taking up the carbon dioxide, thus preventing carbon dioxide from reaching the scrubber material, and slowing the reaction when used again.

==== Other failure modes ====
- Flooding of the ambient pressure volume can occur in diving rebreathers.
- Gas leakage to or from the ambient pressure volume can occur. Since the volume of gas lost or gained is likely to be very small, it is most relevant when the surroundings contain toxic gases or fumes.
- Oxygen monitoring failure can lead to incorrect partial pressure of oxygen in the breathing gas. This is only relevant in mixed gas rebreathers used for diving.
- Gas injection system failure is also mainly a problem of mixed gas diving rebreathers. Oxygen rebreathers gas injection systems are generally robust and reliable and can be manually overridden if they fail, and this form of failure is identifiable by an inappropriate volume of gas in the ambient pressure volume of the rebreather.

== History ==
=== Early history ===
Around 1620, Cornelis Drebbel discovered that heating saltpetre (potassium nitrate) would generate oxygen.

The first basic rebreather based on carbon dioxide absorption was patented in France in 1808 by Pierre-Marie Touboulic from Brest, a mechanic in Napoleon's Imperial Navy. This early rebreather design worked with an oxygen reservoir, the oxygen being delivered progressively by the diver and circulating in a closed circuit through a sponge soaked in limewater, a solution of calcium hydroxide in water. Touboulic called his invention Ichtioandre (Greek for 'fish-man'). There is no evidence of a prototype having been manufactured.

A prototype rebreather was built in 1849 by Pierre Aimable De Saint Simon Sicard,

In 1853 Professor T. Schwann presented a rebreather at the Belgian Academy of Science. It had a large back mounted oxygen tank with working pressure of about 13.3 bar, and two scrubbers containing sponges soaked in a caustic soda solution.

=== Working rebreathers ===
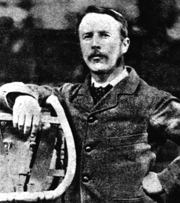
Henry Fleuss, inventor of the rebreather

The first commercially practical closed-circuit scuba was designed and built by the diving engineer Henry Fleuss in 1878, while working for Siebe Gorman in London. His self-contained breathing apparatus consisted of a rubber mask connected to a breathing bag, with (estimated) 50–60% O_{2} supplied from a copper tank and CO_{2} scrubbed by rope yarn soaked in a solution of caustic potash; the system giving a duration of about three hours. Fleuss tested his device in 1879 by spending an hour submerged in a water tank, then one week later by diving to a depth of 5.5 m in open water, upon which occasion he was slightly injured when his assistants abruptly pulled him to the surface.

His apparatus was first used under operational conditions in 1880 by Alexander Lambert, the lead diver on the Severn Tunnel construction project, who was able to travel 1000 feet in the darkness to close several submerged sluice doors in the tunnel; this had defeated his best efforts with standard diving dress due to the danger of the air supply hose becoming fouled on submerged debris, and the strong water currents in the workings. In 1880 Fleuss used a rebreather to inspect Seaham Colliery in the UK after a gas explosion.

Fleuss and Siebe Gorban developed the Proto breathing apparatus for mine rescue in 1911.

Fleuss continually improved his apparatus, adding a demand regulator and tanks capable of holding greater amounts of oxygen at higher pressure. Sir Robert Davis, head of Siebe Gorman, improved the oxygen rebreather in 1910 with his invention of the Davis Submerged Escape Apparatus, the first practical rebreather to be made in quantity. While intended primarily as an emergency escape apparatus for submarine crews, it was soon also used for diving, being a handy shallow water diving apparatus with a thirty-minute endurance, and as an industrial breathing set.

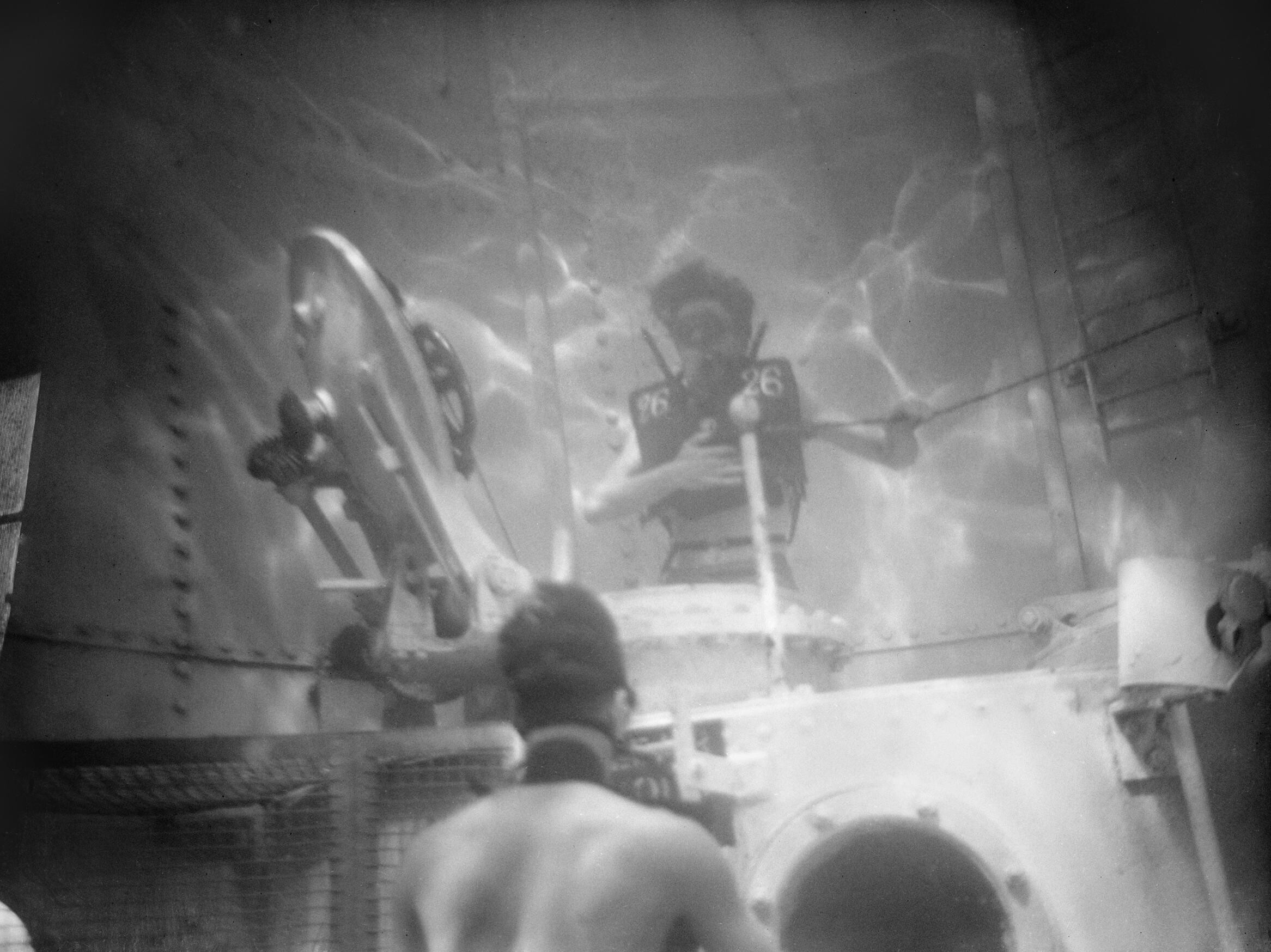
Davis Submerged Escape Apparatus being tested at the submarine escape test tank at HMS Dolphin, Gosport, 14 December 1942

The rig comprised a rubber breathing/buoyancy bag containing a canister of barium hydroxide to scrub exhaled CO_{2} and, in a pocket at the lower end of the bag, a steel pressure cylinder holding approximately 56 litres of oxygen at a pressure of 120 bar. The cylinder was equipped with a control valve and was connected to the breathing bag. Opening the cylinder's valve admitted oxygen to the bag and charged it to the pressure of the surrounding water. The rig also included an emergency buoyancy bag on the front of to help keep the wearer afloat. The DSEA was adopted by the Royal Navy after further development by Davis in 1927. Various industrial oxygen rebreathers such as the Siebe Gorman Salvus and the Siebe Gorman Proto, both invented in the early 1900s, were derived from it.

Professor Georges Jaubert invented the chemical compound Oxylithe in 1907. It was a form of sodium peroxide (Na_{2}O_{2}) or sodium superoxide (NaO_{2}). As it absorbs carbon dioxide in a rebreather's scrubber it emits oxygen. This compound was first incorporated into a rebreather design by Captain S.S. Hall and Dr. O. Rees of the Royal Navy in 1909. Although intended for use as a submarine escape apparatus, it was never accepted by the Royal Navy and was instead used for shallow water diving.

In 1912 the German firm Dräger began mass production of their own version of standard diving dress with the air supply from a rebreather. The apparatus had been invented some years earlier by Hermann Stelzner, an engineer at the Dräger company, for mine rescue.

In the 1930s, after some tragic accidents in the 1920s, the United States Navy began to equip Porpoise- and Salmon-class submarines with primitive rebreathers called Momsen lungs, which were in use until the 1960s.

=== Rebreathers during World War II ===
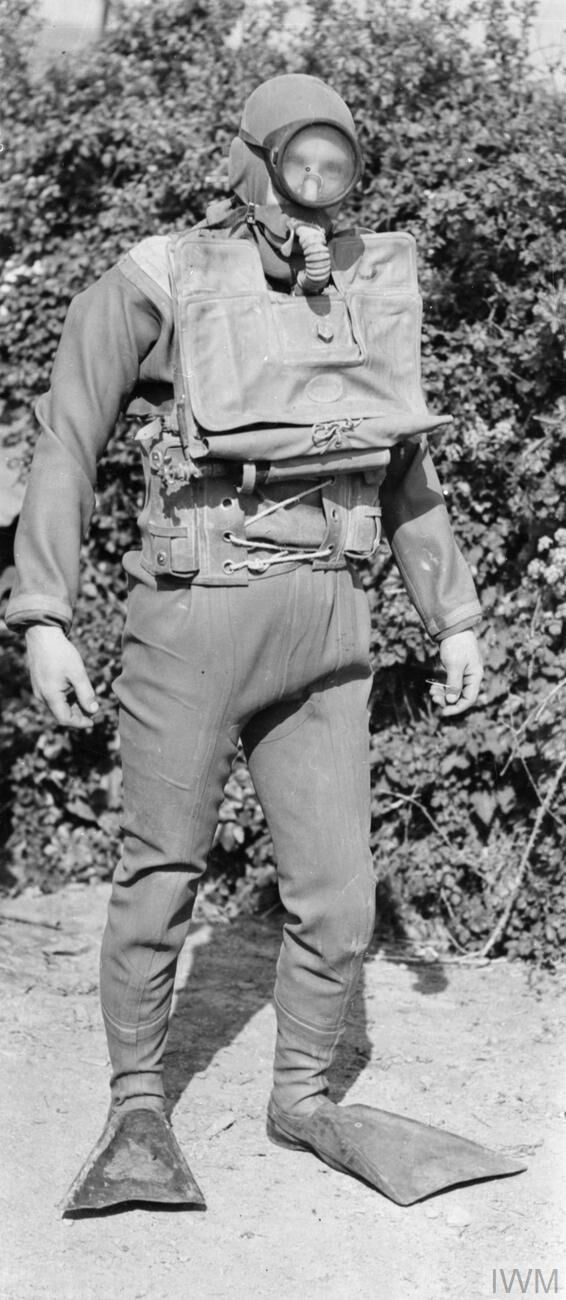
A 1945 Royal Navy frogman with Davis apparatus

In the 1930s, Italian sport spearfishers began to use the Davis rebreather; Italian manufacturers received a licence from the English patent holders to produce it. This practice soon came to the attention of the Italian Navy, which developed an extensively upgraded model designed by Teseo Tesei and Angelo Belloni that was used by its frogman unit Decima Flottiglia MAS with good results during World War II.

During the Second World War, captured Italian frogmen's rebreathers influenced improved designs for British rebreathers. Many British frogmen's breathing sets used aircrew breathing oxygen cylinders salvaged from shot-down German Luftwaffe aircraft. The earliest of these breathing sets may have been modified Davis Submerged Escape Apparatus; their fullface masks were the type intended for the Siebe Gorman Salvus, but in later operations different designs were used, leading to a fullface mask with one big face window, at first circular or oval and later rectangular (mostly flat, but the sides curved back to allow better vision sideways). Early British frogman's rebreathers had rectangular counterlungs on the chest like Italian frogman's rebreathers, but later designs had a square recess in the top of the counterlung so it could extend further up toward the shoulders. In front they had a rubber collar that was clamped around the absorbent canister. Some British armed forces divers used bulky thick diving suits called Sladen suits; one version of it had a flip-up single faceplate for both eyes to let the user get binoculars to his eyes when on the surface.

The Dräger rebreathers, especially the DM20 and DM40 model series, were used by the German helmet divers and German frogmen during World War II. Rebreathers for the US Navy were developed by Dr. Christian J. Lambertsen for underwater warfare. Lambertsen held the first closed-circuit oxygen rebreather course in the United States for the Office of Strategic Services maritime unit at the Naval Academy on 17 May 1943.

During and after WWII, needs arose in the armed forces to dive deeper than allowed by pure oxygen. That prompted, at least in Britain, design of simple constant-flow "mixture rebreather" variants of some of their diving oxygen rebreathers (= what is now called "nitrox"): SCMBA from the SCBA (Swimmer Canoeist's Breathing Apparatus), and CDMBA from the Siebe Gorman CDBA, by adding an extra gas supply cylinder. Before a dive with such a set, the diver had to know the maximum or working depth of his dive, and how fast his body used his oxygen supply, and from those to calculate what to set his rebreather's gas flow rate to.

=== Post-WWII ===
The diving pioneer Hans Hass used Dräger oxygen rebreathers in the early 1940s for underwater cinematography.

Due to the military importance of the rebreather, amply demonstrated during the naval campaigns of the Second World War, most governments were reluctant to issue the technology into the public domain. In Britain rebreather use for civilians was negligible, and the BSAC formally prohibited rebreather use by its members. The Italian firms Pirelli and Cressi-Sub at first each sold a model of sport diving rebreather, but after a while discontinued those models. Some home made rebreathers were used by cave divers to penetrate cave sumps.

Most high-altitude mountaineers use open-circuit oxygen equipment; the 1953 Everest expedition used both closed-circuit and open-circuit oxygen equipment: see bottled oxygen.

Eventually the Cold War ended, and in 1989 the Communist Bloc collapsed, and as a result the perceived risk of sabotage attacks by combat divers dwindled, and Western armed forces had less reason to requisition civilian rebreather patents, and automatic and semi-automatic recreational diving rebreathers with oxygen partial pressure sensors started to appear.

== Manufacturers and models ==
Industrial/rescue:

- Blackett's Aerophor – Nitrox semi-closed-circuit rebreather with liquid gas storage made in England from 1910 onwards for use in mine rescue and other industrial uses.
- Sabre Safety
  - SEFA (Selected Elevated Flow Apparatus) – an industrial oxygen rebreather formerly made by Sabre Safety with 2 hours duration on a filling.
- Siebe Gorman – British manufacturer of diving equipment and salvage contractor
  - The Savox was an oxygen rebreather with a use duration of 45 minutes. It had no hard casing and was worn in front of the body.
  - Siebe Gorman Salvus – Industrial rescue and shallow water oxygen rebreather
  - Siebe Gorman Proto – Industrial rescue rebreather set
- IDA71 – Russian military rebreather for underwater and high altitude use

Others:

== See also ==
- Carbon dioxide scrubber – Device which absorbs carbon dioxide from circulated gas
- Escape set – Self contained breathing apparatus providing gas to escape from a hazardous environment
- Primary life support system, also known as Portable Life Support System – Life support device for a space suit
- Self-contained breathing apparatus (SCBA) – Breathing gas supplied respirator carried by the user (surface-only (industrial) breathing sets including rebreathers)
