= Boothstown Mines Rescue Station =

- Boothstown Mines Rescue Station in 2011

General information
- Location: Boothstown, Greater Manchester,
- Coordinates: 53.505°N 2.4114°W
- Completed: 1933

Design and construction
- Architect(s): Bradshaw, Gass and Hope

Boothstown Mines Rescue Station which served the collieries of the Lancashire and Cheshire Coal Owners on the Lancashire Coalfield opened in November 1933 on a site in Boothstown, close to the East Lancashire Road. The mines rescue station is Grade II listed and at the centre of a conservation area. It replaced mines rescue stations at Howe Bridge, Denton, St Helens and Burnley.

The rescue station and its associated buildings were designed by Bradshaw, Gass and Hope of Bolton. A two-storey building which fronts onto Ellenbrook Road contained a garage, shower rooms, laboratory, oxygen and equipment storage areas and offices, A board room and aviary for the station's canaries were located on the first floor. At the rear, a single-storey section contained U-shaped training galleries representing underground workings. Observation halls overlooked the galleries so that training taking place in the galleries could be inspected. The galleries could be filled with smoke or heated to simulate the conditions that might be encountered in an emergency. A chimney exhausted the fumes and smoke after the training had concluded.

The permanent staff consisted of a superintendent, two instructors and two teams of six rescuers. They lived on site in a development of seven pairs of semi-detached houses and a superintendent's house with allotments, parking, and recreation areas. The site had underground air raid shelters.

Since its closure, the station has been converted to residential use.

== See also ==
- List of mining disasters in Lancashire
