= Howe Bridge Mines Rescue Station =

Coordinates: 53.517°N 2.5104°W

Mines rescue gear and Howe Bridge certificate

Howe Bridge Mines Rescue Station was the first mines rescue station on the Lancashire Coalfield opened in 1908 in Howe Bridge, Atherton, then in the historic county of Lancashire, England.

Before Britain's first mines rescue station opened at Tankersley in Yorkshire in 1902, pit managers and volunteers were usually the first untrained mines rescuers. They fought fires, rescued victims and recovered bodies in the collieries in which they worked. Rescue stations were recommended in a Royal Commission in 1886 but were not compulsory until after the 1911 Coal Mines Act was passed. In 1906 the Lancashire and Cheshire Coal Owners Association formed a committee which decided to provide a mines rescue station in Lovers Lane Atherton.

The first rescuers were provided with Siebe Gorman Proto breathing apparatus which was selected by competition. A team from the rescue station was tasked with training rescue teams from each colliery, and provided emergency assistance to collieries throughout the Lancashire Coalfield.

Teams from the rescue station attended disasters at the Maypole Colliery in Abram in 1908 and the Pretoria Pit Disaster in 1910.

The station closed in 1934 when Boothstown Mines Rescue Station, the central rescue station for the coalfield, became operative.

== See also ==
- List of mining disasters in Lancashire
