= Siebe Gorman Proto =

Industrial rescue rebreather set

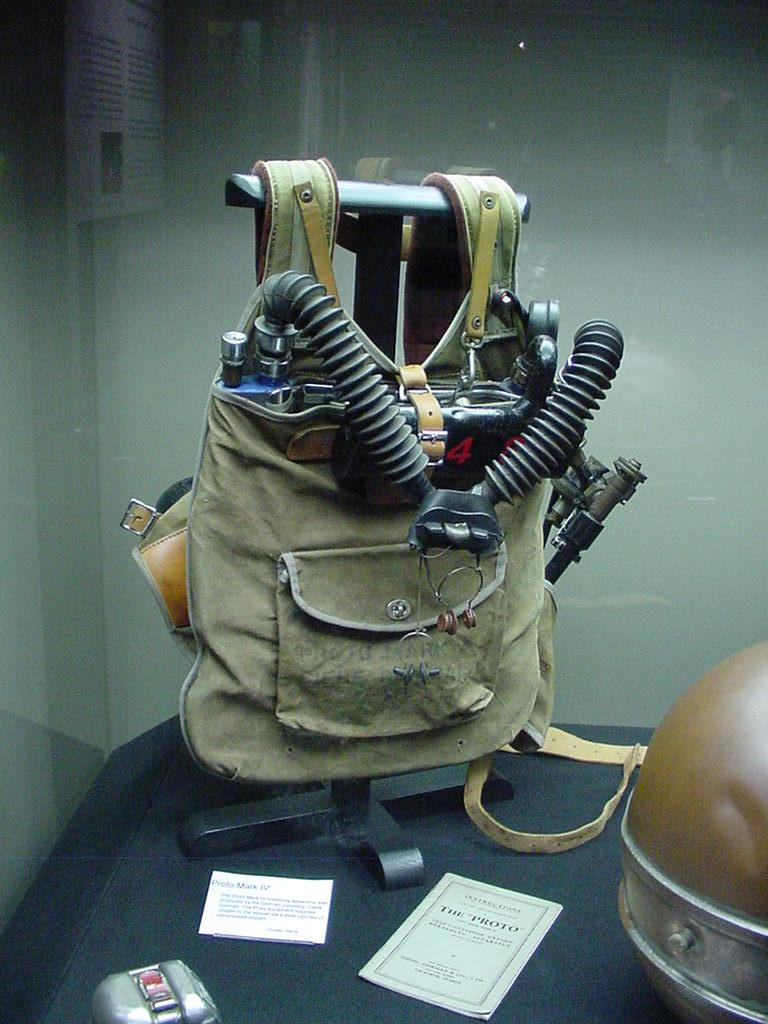
- A Siebe Gorman Proto seen from the front, at the National Coal Mining Museum for England
- Uses: Rebreather for firefighters
- Manufacturer: Siebe Gorman

The Proto is a type of rebreather that was made by Siebe Gorman. It was an industrial breathing set and not suitable for diving. It was made from 1914 or earlier to the 1960s or later. (Distinguish from "Proton", which is another sort of Siebe Gorman rebreather). Also known as proto suits.

Its breathing bag was worn on the chest. It had one or two oxygen cylinders, across the lumbar part of the back: often one, but this image shows two. Its duration in use was one or two hours, dependent on the size of oxygen cylinder fitted. Its absorbent (tradename Protosorb) was loose in the bottom of the breathing bag, restrained by a perforated cloth partition, and not in a canister. It had two wide breathing tubes running from the breathing bag to either a strapped-in mouthpiece (used with goggles) or an industrial-type fullface mask known as a Vistarama face mask, with a curved window and an inner orinasal mask. The canister seen on the front of the bag was to cool the gas in circuit, as the absorbent gets warm as it absorbs carbon dioxide, and that warming of the gas in circuit is welcome when scuba diving in cold water, but is not welcome in hot industrial situations including in deep mines.

It was used by firefighters and by rescuers in coalmines, long before open-circuit industrial breathing sets based on the aqualung became common. It appeared in news images of coalmine rescue squads. In 1908 the apparatus was chosen for use by rescuers from the newly formed Howe Bridge Mines Rescue Station.

These sets were used in the London fire brigade from the 1950s till the early to late 1970s, when these rebreathers were replaced by compressed air sets which use a cylinder strapped to the back of the firefighter and the air fed through a hose to the firefighter's full face mask: this is their current type of breathing apparatus.

Some had a whistle that automatically sounded when its oxygen cylinder pressure became low in use. This feature was introduced following the death, in January 1958, of two London firemen at the fire that occurred at the Smithfield Central Meat Market in central London.

The first version was designed by Fleuss and Davis in about 1906-1910. It had equal balance back and front of the wearer, and avoided projections on the back that could catch when crawling through holes. The more vulnerable parts were in front in sight of the wearer. The reducing valve was of the constant feed type.

== See also ==
- Mine rescue – Rescue of persons trapped after mining accidents
