= Mine rescue chamber =

Emergency shelter in underground environments

A mine rescue chamber is an emergency shelter installed in hazardous environments, typically underground. It is also known as refuge chamber, refuge bay, or refuge alternative. Refuge chambers come in multiple types and models, and are used in multiple industries including metalliferous mining, coal, tunnelling and petrochemical facilities.

In emergencies, when evacuation is no-longer safe or practical, the rescue chamber is designed to provide a safe and secure ‘go-to’ area for personnel to gather and await extraction.

Essentially, rescue chambers are sealed environments built to sustain life in an emergency or hazardous event such as a truck fire or toxic gas release. They provide a secure area with shelter, water, and breathable air, for people to remain until they are rescued or the hazard subsides.

Refuge chambers need to be sealed to prevent the ingress of toxins such as smoke contaminating the breathable air within the chamber. The sealed area has a closed circuit breathing apparatus; where carbon dioxide and other toxins are removed, oxygen is added, and temperature and humidity are maintained, all while protecting occupants from the external threat.

The capacity and duration can vary depending on the chamber build. Communication equipment is also available. The chambers are required to be located in close proximity to worker areas.

== Permanent refuge chambers ==
Permanent refuge chambers are created by sealing a concrete room that is formed in the mine. This system stands out as the most economical solution for large number of personnel underground at any one time. Permanent refuge chambers can be used for secondary purposes such as refectory, first aid room and meeting point for the personnel.

== Hard rock mining ==
Hard rock mining involves uncovering and extracting non-fuel metal and mineral deposits of solid ores or eroded deposits in stream beds. Eleven common minerals mined are copper, gold, iron ore, lead, molybdenum, phosphate rock, platinum, potash, silver, uranium, and zinc. In this mining method, refuge chambers can be moved to the required area of the mine.

Examples of refuge chamber legislation include:

- Government of Western Australia, Department of Mines and Petroleum, 2013, “Refuge Chambers In Underground Mines –Guideline”
- Biblioteca del Congreso Nacional de Chile/ BCN, 2013, “Aprueba Reglamento De Seguridad Minera”
- Workplace Safety North, Mines & Aggregates Safety & Health Association, 1998, “Guidelines for Mine Rescue Refuge Stations”
- Ministry of Labor and Social Security, 2017, Refuge Chambers Installed In Underground Mine Workplaces
- YERALTI MADEN İŞYERLERİNDE KURULACAK SIĞINMA ODALARI HAKKINDA TEBLİĞ

== Coal mining ==
The rescue chambers in a typical coal mine provide 96 hours of air, food and water.

=== Guidelines and legislation ===
Bosnia and Herzegovina

First Refuge Chambers for Underground Mining in Bosnia and Herzegovina per Adriatic Metals: QUARTERLY ACTIVITIES REPORT, For the three months ended 30 September 2023 (“Q3” or “Quarter”)

==== Mexico ====
NORMA Official Mexicana, 2012, NORMA Official Mexicana NOM-023-STPS-2012, Underground Mines and Opencast Mines – Conditions of Security and Health at Work http://www.stps.gob.mx/bp/secciones/dgsst/normatividad/normas/Nom-023.pdf

==== Peru ====
Ministry of Energy and Mines, 2010, Decreto Supremo que aprueba el Reglamento de Seguridad y Salud Ocupacional y otras medidas complementarias en minería http://www.minem.gob.pe/minem/archivos/file/Mineria/LEGISLACION/2010/AGOSTO/DS%20055-2010–EM.pdf

==== United States ====
EMERGENCY SHELTERS: SEC. 315. The Secretary or an authorized representative of the Secretary may prescribe in any coal mine that rescue chambers, properly sealed and ventilated, be erected at suitable locations in the mine to which persons may go in case of an emergency for protection against hazards. Such chambers shall be properly equipped with first aid materials, an adequate supply of air and self-contained breathing equipment, an independent communication system to the surface, and proper accommodations for the persons while awaiting rescue, and such other equipment as the Secretary may require. A plan for the erection, maintenance, and revisions of such chambers and the training of the miners in their proper use shall be submitted by the operator to the Secretary for his approval.

Mine Safety and Health Administration, 2008, 30 CFR Parts 7 and 75 Refuge Alternatives for Underground Coal Mines; Final Rule [https://www.govinfo.gov/content/pkg/FR-2013-08-08/pdf/2013-19028.pdf gpo.gov]
