= SEFA =

Industrial rescue rebreather

The SEFA is a make of backpack industrial breathing set formerly made by Sabre Safety. It is an oxygen rebreather. "SEFA" is an acronym for "selected elevated flow apparatus".

== Description ==
It is in a shiny backpack stainless steel sheet casing with rounded corners and edges, 16 inches wide, 21½ inches high, 6½ inches front to back. It has two wide corrugated breathing tubes leading to a fullface mask which has an inner orinasal mask and a front panel for talking through. Its breathing tubes are 22 inches long, and face forward as they come off the backpack casing.

Its full duration on a filling is 2 hours. It does not have a demand valve or electronic parts, and in theory this would be fewer parts to suffer from failures. It is not designed for scuba diving, but can be used for short shallow submersion such as going through short flooded sections of underground passages. Its casing, to keep grit and stones out of its working, is completely sealed, except for a large vent panel covered with metal mesh, and holes for the oxygen cylinder's on/off valve and the cylinder pressure gauge. Its oxygen flow can be set to 5 or 10 liters/minute. Its intended absorbent is a special make called SefaSorb, which is mostly calcium hydroxide.

As usual, the absorbent makes the breathing gas in circuit hot as it absorbs carbon dioxide. This would be welcome while scuba diving in cold water, but in warm air in a deep mine would be unwelcome. To try to get rid of that heat, the breathing gas is passed through a damp chamber, so the damp will absorb some heat as it evaporates, as in some air conditioning units. It is not very effective, in normal use the breathing air temperature of the SEFA will rapidly exceed 45 °C, and more under heavy work. Being made almost entirely from metal, the SEFA does dissipate its thermal load relatively easily.

The SEFA was not a spectacular success, being exported to very few countries. It was a case of "too little too late", a 2-hour duration set entering a market already mainly dominated by the German Draeger BG174 (with a 4 hour duration). The SEFA was difficult to service, most parts could only be removed with special tools, and reassembly could be problematic. Testing a SEFA often caused extra work for the operator, as several small leaks in the breathing loop would inevitably arise after servicing and need troubleshooting before the set could be put back in use. Compared to the modern day Draeger PSS BG4 sets, and the American BioPak. which can all be completely stripped and reassembled by hand without using tools, the SEFA is less convenient to maintain.

The SEFA is still in use in the mining industry in India, and up until 2006 was still being used at the Porgera Gold Mine in Papua New Guinea.

== History ==
It was being designed from 1985 onwards in response to demands from the British coal mining industry for a new make of mines rescue breathing set with longer duration for bulk than an open-circuit set. They were made from 1989 to 2004. Production ceased because of declining demand due to the decline of the British coal mining industry. They are no longer official issue because of lack of availability of spare parts. The British coal industry, when needing rebreathers, now uses a German rebreather made by Draeger.

== Images ==
When photographed these sets were being used without their internal parts during a demonstration of rescue techniques in open air without any gas hazard in the area.

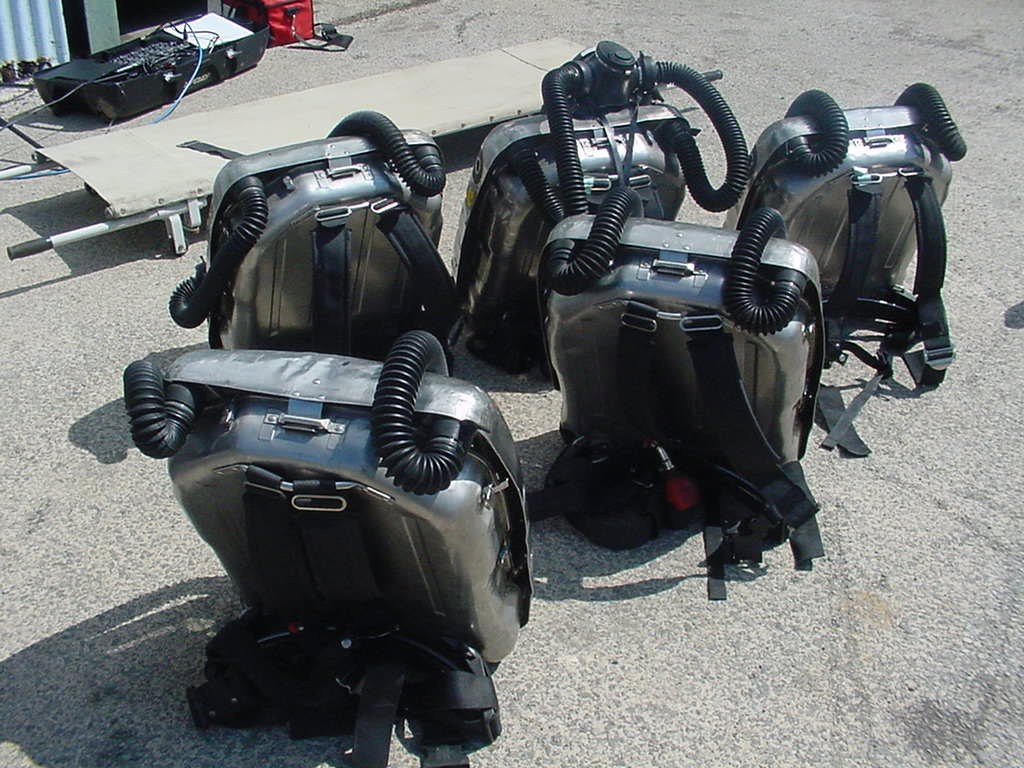
5 SEFAs seen from top and front

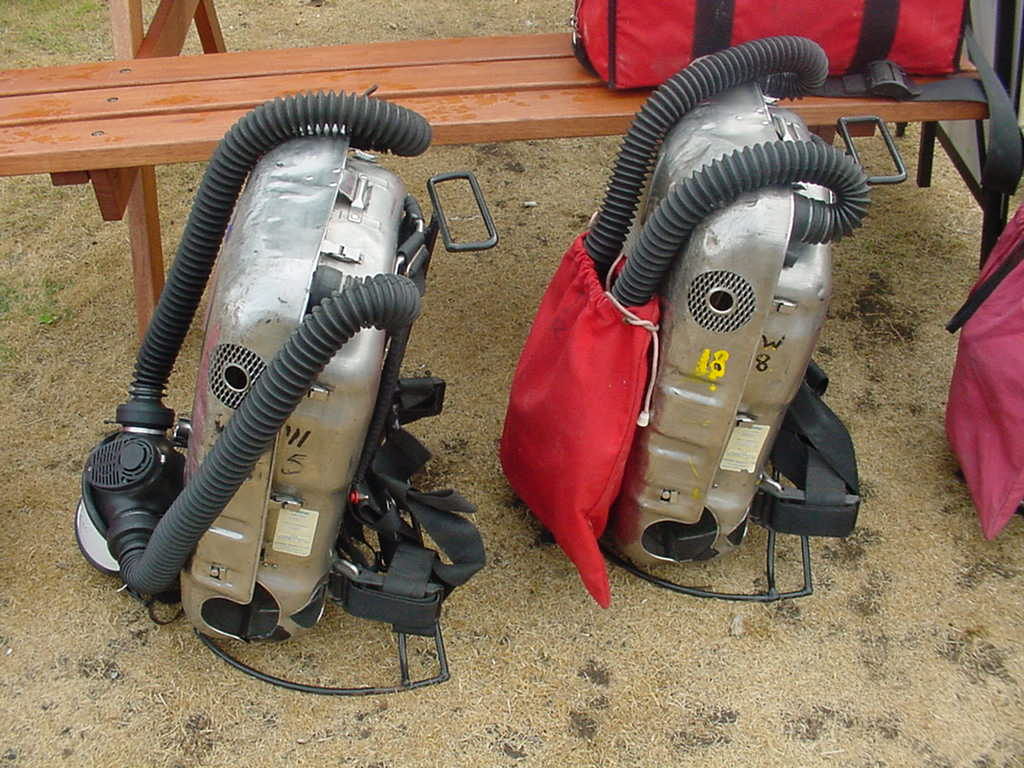
2 SEFAs seen from the right side

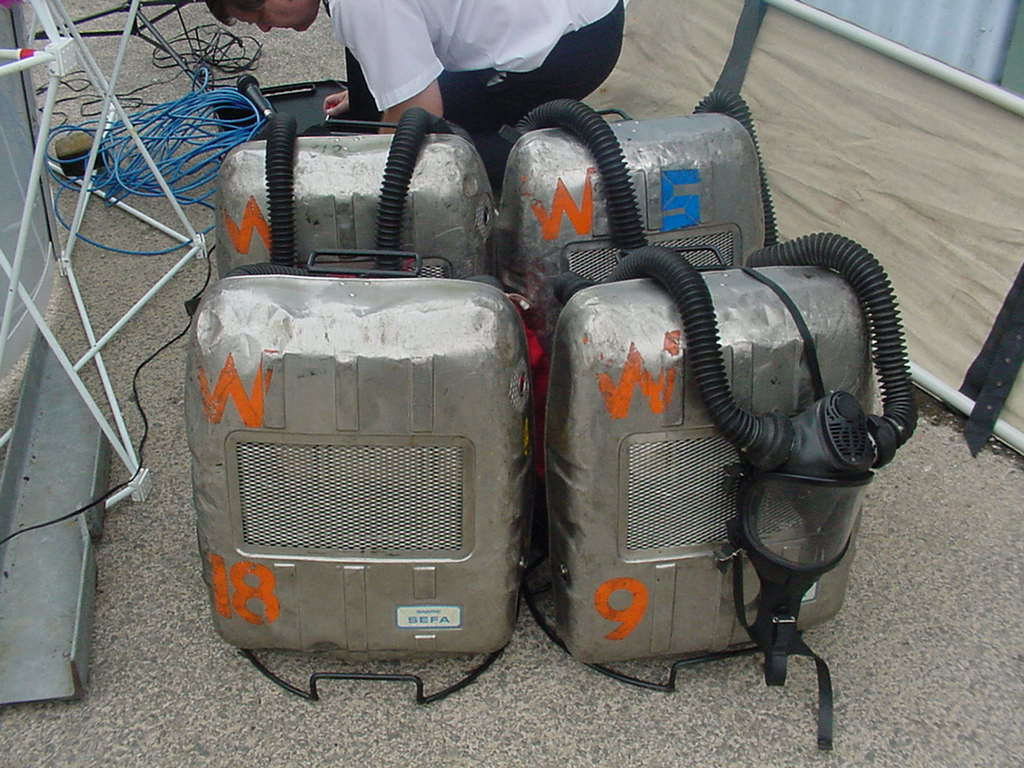
4 SEFAs seen from the back

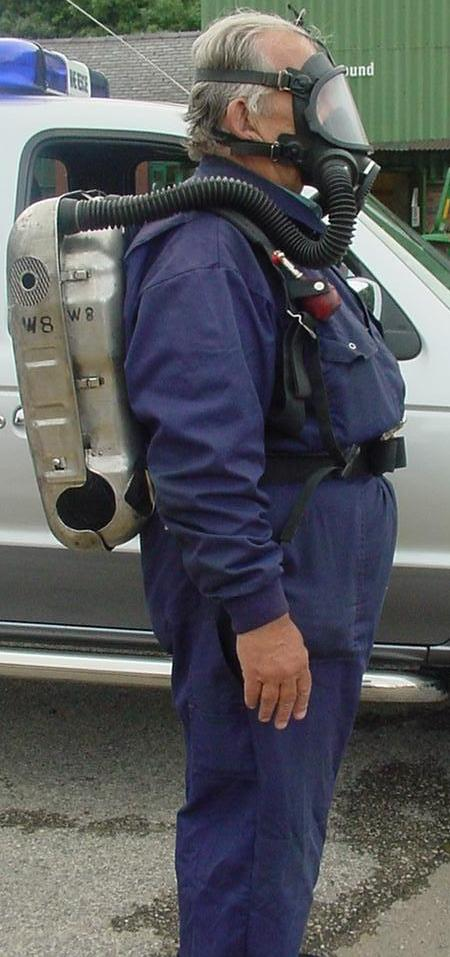
Man in boilersuit wearing a SEFA, seen from the side
