= Mine rescue =

Rescue of persons trapped after mining accidents

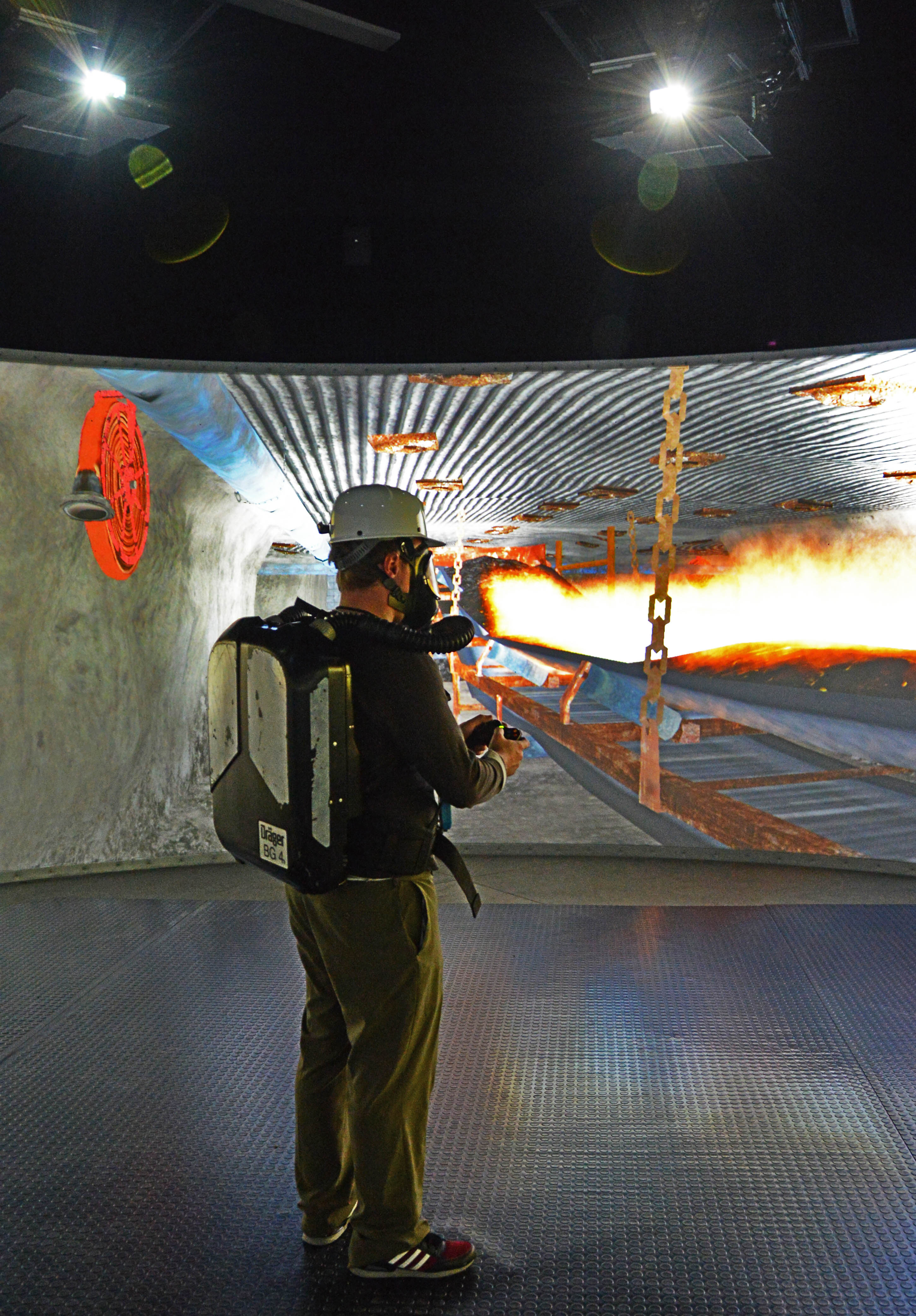
Training for mine rescuers conducted aboveground

A video describing challenges experienced by mine rescue personnel

Mine rescue or mines rescue is the specialised job of rescuing miners and others who have become trapped or injured in underground mines because of mining accidents, roof falls or floods and disasters such as explosions.

== Background ==
Mining laws in developed countries require trained, equipped mine rescue personnel to be available at all mining operations at surface and underground mining operations. Mine rescue teams must know the procedures used to rescue miners trapped by various hazards, including fire, explosions, cave-ins, toxic gas, smoke inhalation, and water entering the mine. Most mine rescue teams are composed of miners who know the mine and are familiar with the mining machinery they may encounter during the rescue, the layout of workings and geological conditions and working practices. Local and state governments may have teams on-call ready to respond to mine accidents.

== Rescuers and equipment ==
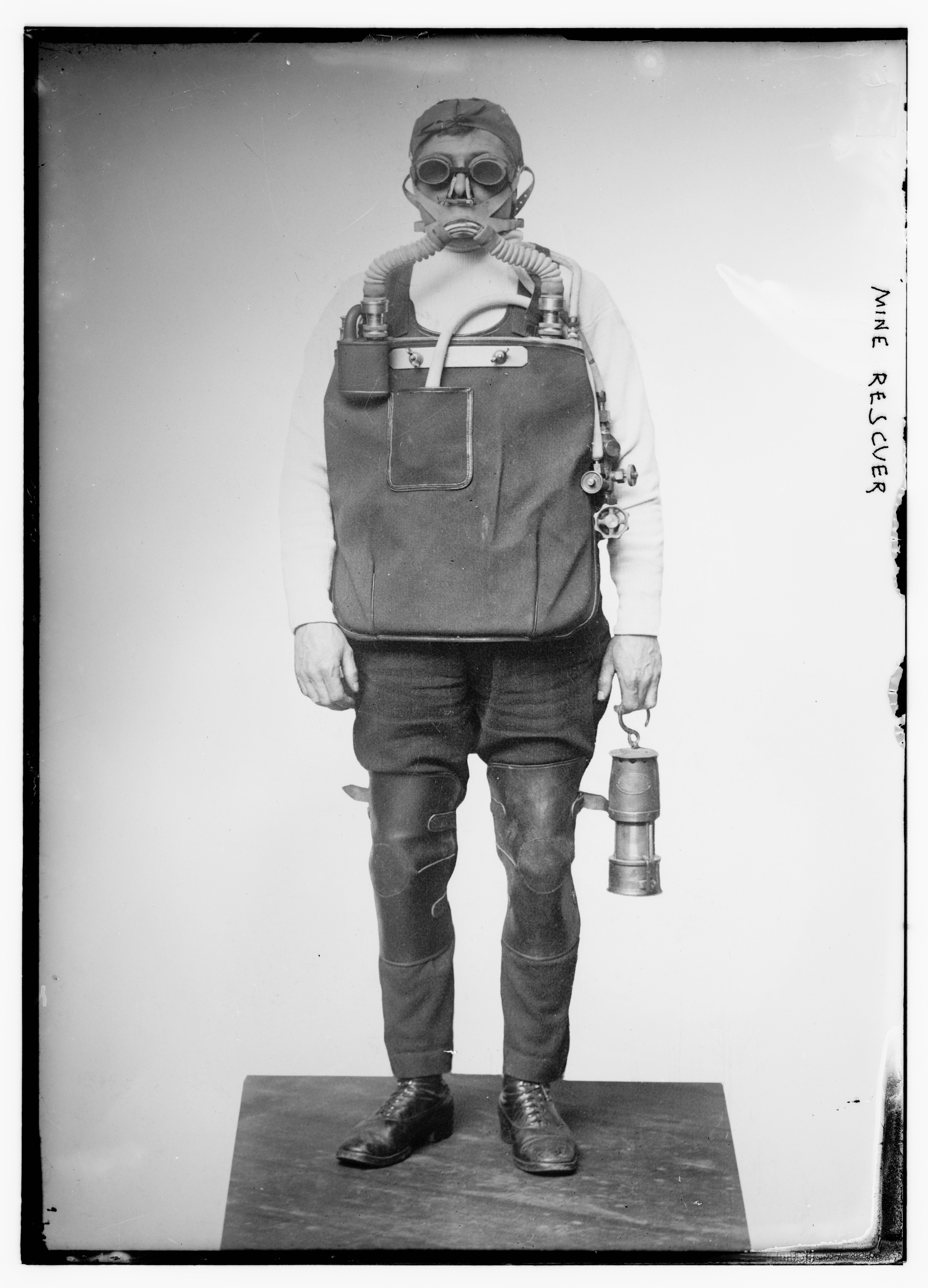
U.S. mine rescuer, c. 1912

The first mines rescuers were the colliery managers and volunteer colleagues of the victims of the explosions, roof-falls and other accidents underground. They looked for signs of life, rescued the injured, sealed off underground fires so it would be possible to reopen the pit, and recovered bodies while working in dangerous conditions sometimes at great cost to themselves. Apart from safety lamps to detect gases, they had no special equipment. Most deaths in coal mines were caused by the poisonous gases caused by explosions, particularly afterdamp or carbon monoxide. Survivors of explosions were rare and most apparatus taken underground was used to fight fires or recover bodies. Early breathing apparatus derived from under-sea diving was developed and a crude nose and mouthpiece and breathing tubes was tried in France before 1800. Gas masks of various types were tried in the early-19th century: some had chemical filters, others goat skin reservoirs or metal canisters, but none eliminated carbon dioxide rendering them of limited use. Theodore Schwann, a German professor working in Belgium, designed breathing apparatus based on the regenerative process in 1854 and it was exhibited in Paris in the 1870s but may never have been used.

Henry Fleuss developed Schwann's apparatus into a form of self-contained breathing apparatus in the 1880s and it was used after an explosion at Seaham Colliery in 1881. The apparatus was further developed by Siebe Gorman into the Proto rebreather. In 1908 the Proto apparatus was chosen in a trial of equipment from several manufacturers to select the most efficient apparatus for use underground at Howe Bridge Mines Rescue Station and became the standard in rescue stations set up after the Coal Mines Act 1911 (1 & 2 Geo. 5. c. 50). An early use of the breathing apparatus was in the aftermath of an explosion at the Maypole Colliery in Abram in August 1908. Six trained rescuers at Howe Bridge trained men at individual collieries in the use of the equipment and at the time of the Pretoria Pit Disaster in 1910 several hundred trained men participated in the operation.

Mine rescue teams are trained in first aid, the use of a variety of tools, and the operation of self-contained breathing apparatus (SCBA) to work in passages filled with mine gases such as firedamp, afterdamp, chokedamp, and sometimes shallow submersion.

From 1989 to 2004, the SEFA backpack SCBA was made. Rescuers used it and its successors the Draeger rebreather and Biomarine. Narrow spaces in mines are often too constricted for bulky open circuit sets with big compressed-air cylinders.

In 2010, an all-female mine rescue team was formed at the Colorado School of Mines.

== British mines rescue stations ==
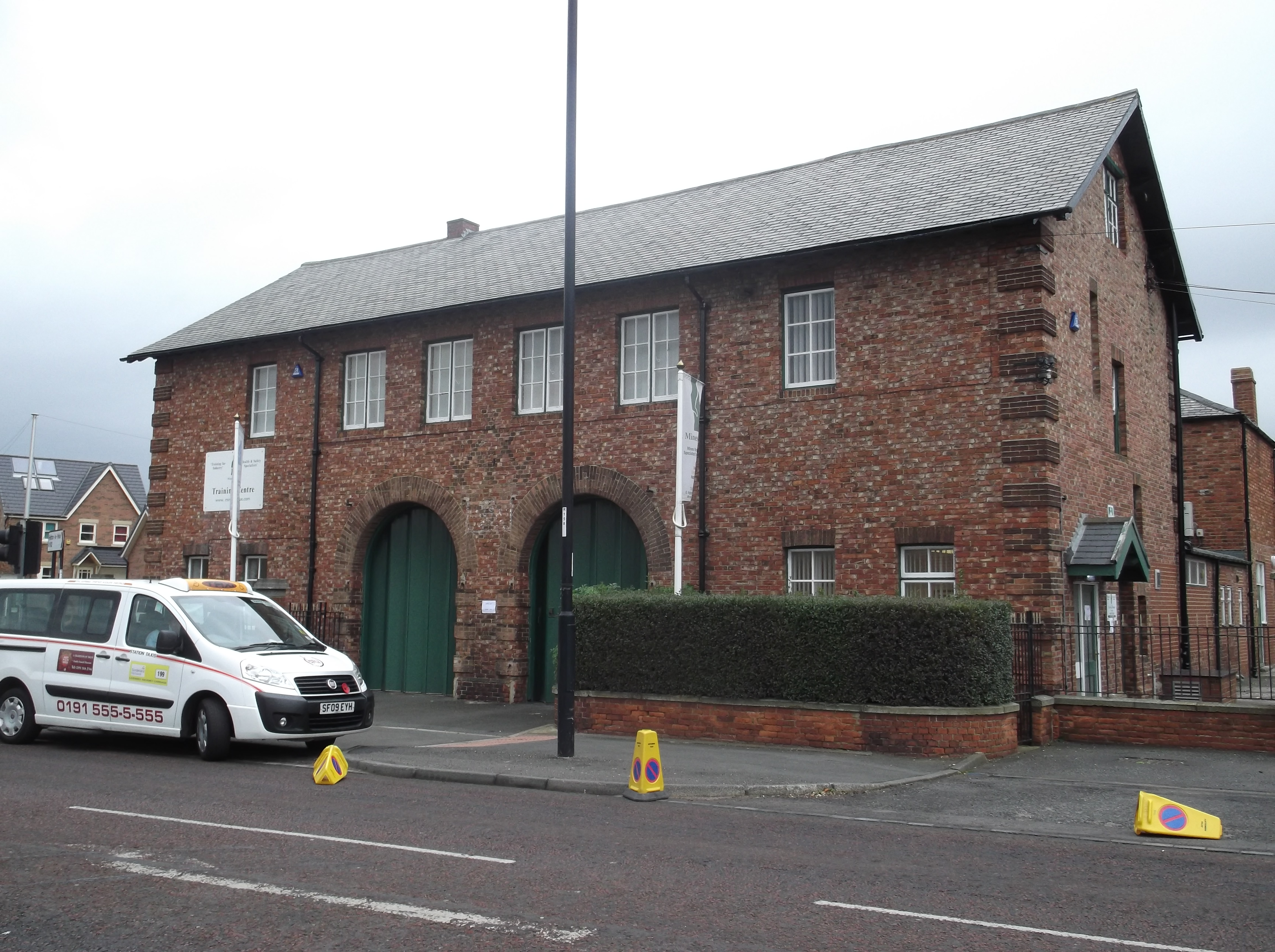
The Grade II listed building housing Houghton Le Spring Mines Rescue Station opened in 1913 and is still part of the British Mines Rescue Service.

Altofts Colliery manager, W.E. Garforth suggested using a "gallery" to test rescue apparatus and train rescuers in 1899 and one was built at his pit in Altofts West Yorkshire. It cost £13,000. He also suggested the idea of a network of rescue stations. The first British mines rescue station opened at Tankersley in 1902. It was commissioned by the West Yorkshire Coal Mine Owners Association. Its building is grade II listed.

In the United Kingdom a series of disasters in the 19th century brought about Royal Commissions which developed the idea of improving mine safety. The commissions influenced the Coal Mines Act 1911 which made the provision of rescue stations compulsory. By 1919 there were 43 stations in the UK but as the coal industry declined from the last quarter of the 20th century many were closed, leaving six as of 2013, at Crossgates in Fife, Houghton-le-Spring in Tyne and Wear, Kellingley at Beal in North Yorkshire, Rawdon in Derbyshire, Dinas at Tonypandy in Glamorgan and at Mansfield Woodhouse in Nottinghamshire. The MRS Training centre at Houghton-le-Spring opened in 1913 is one of the six surviving British rescue stations which are operated by MRS Training and Rescue. It is a Grade II listed building.

Mines rescue featured in the 1952 film The Brave Don't Cry which was a testimony to the Knockshinnoch disaster. Mine rescuers have often been recognised in Britain by the award of gallantry medals.

In Britain, mines rescue teams may be called to investigate holes in the ground that have appeared because of land surface subsidence into old mineshafts and mine workings.

== Poland ==
In Poland, there are groups of rescuers in each mine. In addition, there are three specialized emergency stations in the Bytom, Jaworzno and Wodzisław Śląski. They are operational 24/7.

== South Africa ==
In South Africa, mine rescue teams are also known as "Proto teams", a reference to the original Siebe Gorman Proto oxygen rebreather equipment they used.

== First World War ==
During World War I the British army mined underneath enemy lines in occupied France, and mine rescue training was required for the soldiers, often skilled coal-miners who undertook the work as part of the Tunnelling companies of the Royal Engineers. Much documentation on military mining activities was classified information until 1961.

== See also ==
- San José Mine mine rescue
- Drägerman
- Mine rescue chamber
- Boothstown Mines Rescue Station
- Ontario Mine Rescue
- Cave rescue

== Sources ==
- Davies, Alan (2009), Atherton Collieries, Amberley, ISBN 978-1-84868-489-8
- Preece, Geoff; Ellis, Peter (1981), Coalmining, a handbook to the History of Coalmining Gallery, Salford Museum of Mining, City of Salford Cultural Services
