= Siebe =

Siebe may refer to:

- Augustus Siebe: inventor of the standard diving dress
- Siebe Gorman Ltd: a company founded by Augustus Siebe and his son-in-law Gorman making diving helmets
- Siebe plc: a large engineering group
- Siebe Suit, or standard diving dress
