= Interlocking =

Arrangement of railway signal apparatus

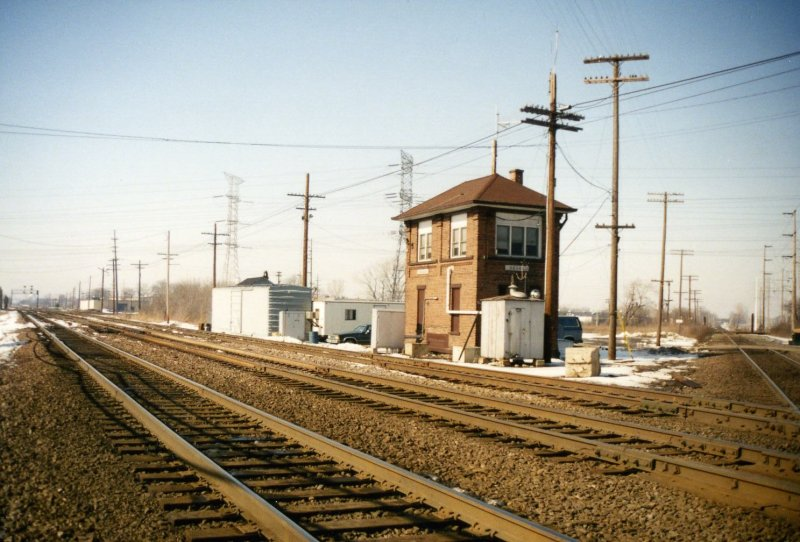
The tower and tracks at Deval interlocking, Des Plaines, Illinois, in 1993

In railway signalling, an interlocking is an arrangement of signal apparatus that prevents conflicting movements through an arrangement of tracks such as junctions or crossings. In North America, a set of signalling appliances and tracks interlocked together are sometimes collectively referred to as an interlocking plant or just as an interlocking, and the term "interlocking" is sometimes used to refer to a set of railroad switches that allows trains to move from either of two tracks to the other. An interlocking system is designed so that it is impossible to display a signal to proceed unless the route to be used is proven safe.

Interlocking is a safety measure designed to prevent signals and points (switches) from being changed in an improper sequence. For example, interlocking would prevent a signal from being changed to indicate a diverging route unless the corresponding points had been changed first. In North America, the official railroad definition of interlocking is: "An arrangement of signals and signal appliances so interconnected that their movements must succeed each other in proper sequence".

== Configuration and use ==
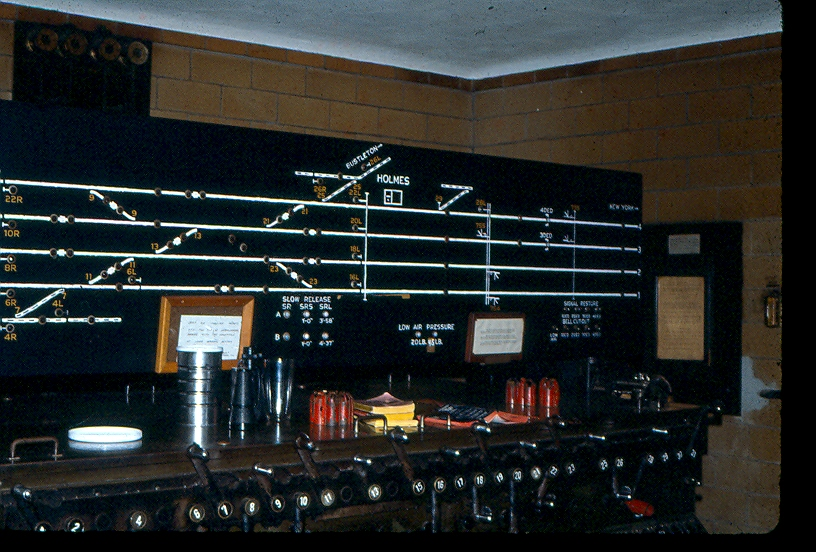
A model board and lever machine

A minimal interlocking consists of signals, but one usually includes additional appliances, such as points and facing-point locks (US: switches) and derails, and may include crossings at grade and movable bridges. Some of the fundamental principles of interlocking include:

- Signals may not be operated to permit conflicting train movements to take place at the same time on set route.
- Switches and other appliances in the route must be properly set (in position) before a signal may allow train movements to enter that route.
- Once a route is set and a train is given a signal to proceed over that route, all switches and other movable appliances in the route are locked in position until either
  - the train passes out of the portion of the route affected, or
  - the signal to proceed is withdrawn and sufficient time has passed to ensure that a train approaching the route has had opportunity to come to a stop before passing the signal.

== History ==
Railway interlocking is of British origin, where numerous patents were granted. In June 1856, John Saxby received the first patent for interlocking switches and signals. In 1868, Saxby (of Saxby & Farmer) was awarded a patent for what is known today in North America as preliminary latch locking. Preliminary latch locking became so successful that, by 1873, 13,000 mechanical locking levers were employed on the London and North Western Railway alone.

The first experiment with mechanical interlocking in the United States took place in 1875, by J. M. Toucey and William Buchanan, at Spuyten Duyvil Junction, in New York, on the New York Central and Hudson River Railroad (NYC&HRR). At the time, Toucey was General Superintendent, and Buchanan Superintendent of Machinery, of the NYC&HRR. Toucey and Buchanan formed the Toucey and Buchanan Interlocking Switch and Signal Company in Harrisburg, Pennsylvania in 1878. The first important installations of their mechanism were on the switches and signals of the Manhattan Elevated Railroad Company and the New York Elevated Railroad Company in 1877–78. Compared to Saxby's design, Toucey and Buchanans' interlocking mechanism was more cumbersome and less sophisticated, and so was not implemented very widely. Union Switch & Signal bought their company in 1882.

As technology advanced, the railway signaling industry looked to incorporate these new technologies into interlockings to increase the speed of route setting and the number of appliances controlled from a single point and to expand the distance between the controlled appliances and the point of control. The challenge facing the signal industry was achieving the same level of safety and reliability that was inherent to purely mechanical systems. An experimental hydro-pneumatic interlocking was installed at the Bound Brook, New Jersey junction of the Philadelphia and Reading Railroad and the Lehigh Valley Railroad in 1884. By 1891, there were 18 hydro-pneumatic plants, on six railroads, operating a total of 482 levers. The installations worked, but there were serious defects in the design, and little saving of labour was achieved.

The inventors of the hydro-pneumatic system moved forward to an electro-pneumatic system in 1891, and this system, best identified with the Union Switch & Signal Company, was first installed on the Chicago and Northern Pacific Railroad at its drawbridge across the Chicago River. By 1900, 54 electro-pneumatic interlocking plants, controlling a total of 1,864 interlocking levers, were in use on 13 North American railroads. This type of system would remain one of two viable competing systems into the future, although it did have the disadvantage of needing extra single-use equipment and requiring much maintenance.

Interlockings using electric motors for moving switches and signals became viable in 1894, when Siemens in Austria installed the first such interlocking at Přerov (now in the Czech Republic). Another interlocking of this type was installed in Westend near Berlin in 1896. In North America, the first installation of an interlocking plant using electric switch machines was at Eau Claire, Wisconsin on the Chicago, St. Paul, Minneapolis and Omaha Railway in 1901, by General Railway Signal Company (GRS, now a unit of Alstom, headquartered in Levallois-Perret, near Paris). By 1913, this type system had been installed on 83 railroads across 35 US states and Canadian provinces, in 440 interlocking plants using 21,370 levers.

== Interlocking types ==
Interlockings can be categorized as mechanical, electrical (electro-mechanical or relay-based), or electronic/computer-based.

=== Mechanical interlocking ===
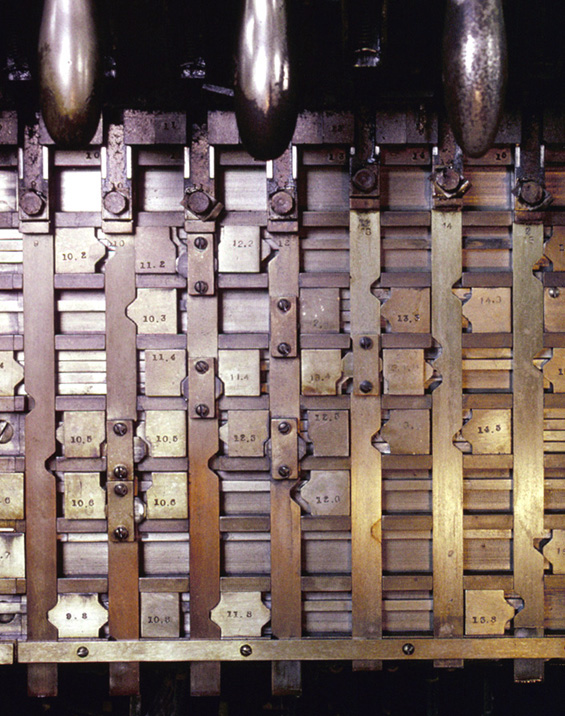
A view of the locking bed inside Deval Tower, Des Plaines, Illinois

In mechanical interlocking plants, a locking bed is constructed, consisting of steel bars forming a grid. The levers that operate switches, derails, signals or other appliances are connected to the bars running in one direction. The bars are constructed so that if the function controlled by a given lever conflicts with that controlled by another lever, mechanical interference is set up in the cross locking between the two bars, in turn preventing the conflicting lever movement from being made.

In purely mechanical plants, the levers operate the field devices, such as signals, directly via a mechanical rodding or wire connection. The levers are about shoulder height since they must supply a mechanical advantage for the operator. Cross locking of levers was effected such that the extra leverage could not defeat the locking (preliminary latch lock).

The first mechanical interlocking was installed in 1843 at Bricklayers Arms Junction, England.

=== Electro-mechanical interlocking ===
Power interlockings may also use mechanical locking to ensure the proper sequencing of levers, but the levers are considerably smaller as they themselves do not directly control the field devices. If the lever is free to move based on the locking bed, contacts on the levers actuate the switches and signals which are operated electrically or electro-pneumatically. Before a control lever may be moved into a position which would release other levers, a signal must be received from the field element that it has actually moved into the position requested. The locking bed shown is for a GRS power interlocking machine.

=== Relay interlocking ===
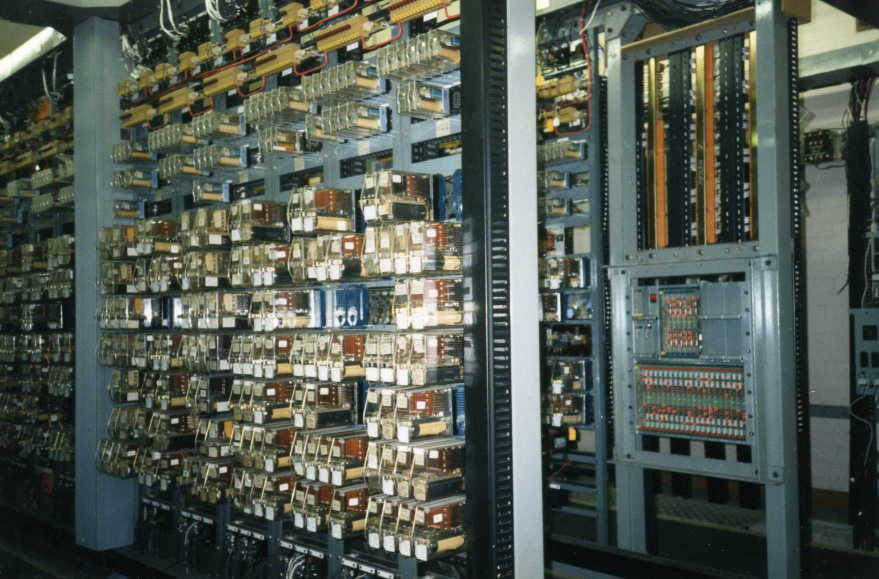
Part of a relay interlocking using miniature plug-in relays

Interlockings effected purely electrically (sometimes referred to as all-electric) consist of complex circuitry made up of relays in an arrangement of relay logic that ascertain the state or position of each signal appliance. As appliances are operated, their change of position opens some circuits that lock out other appliances that would conflict with the new position. Similarly, other circuits are closed when the appliances they control become safe to operate. Equipment used for railroad signalling tends to be expensive because of its specialized nature and fail-safe design.

Interlockings operated solely by electrical circuitry may be operated locally or remotely, with the large mechanical levers of previous systems being replaced by buttons, switches or toggles on a panel or video interface. Such an interlocking may also be designed to operate without a human operator. These arrangements are termed automatic interlockings, and the approach of a train sets its own route automatically, provided no conflicting movements are in progress.

GRS manufactured the first all-relay interlocking system in 1929. It was installed in Lincoln, Nebraska on the Chicago, Burlington and Quincy Railroad.

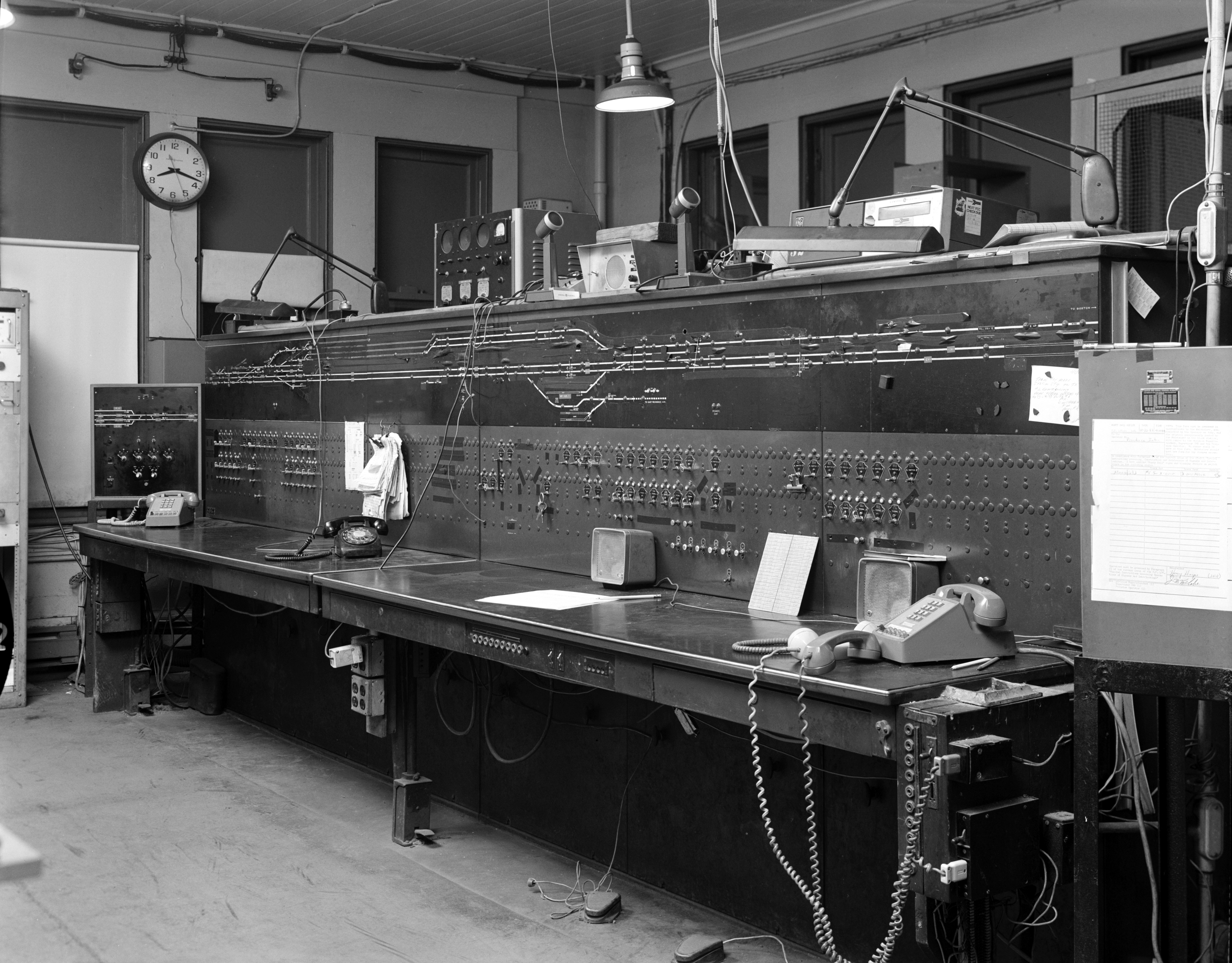
Control panel for a US&S relay interlocking

Entrance-Exit Interlocking (NX) was the original brand name of the first generation relay-based centralized traffic control (CTC) interlocking system introduced in 1936 by GRS (represented in Europe by Metropolitan-Vickers). The advent of all electric interlocking technology allowed for more automated route setting procedures as opposed to having an operator line each part of the route manually. The NX system allowed an operator looking at the diagram of a complicated junction to simply push a button on the known entrance track and another button on the desired exit track. The logic circuitry handled all the necessary actions of commanding the underlying relay interlocking to set signals and throw switches in the proper sequence, as required to provide valid route through the interlocking plant. The first NX installation was in 1937 at Brunswick on the Cheshire Lines, UK. The first US installation was on the New York Central Railroad (NYCRR) at Girard Junction, Ohio in 1937. Another NYCRR installation was on the main line between Utica, New York and Rochester, New York, and this was quickly followed up by three installations on the New York City Subway's IND Fulton Street Line in 1948.

Other NX style systems were implemented by other railroad signal providers. For example, Union Route (UR) was the brand name of their Entrance-Exit system supplied by Union Switch & Signal Co. (US&S), and introduced in 1951. NX type systems and their costly pre-solid state control logic only tended to be installed in the busier or more complicated terminal areas where it could increase capacity and reduce staffing requirements. In a move that was popular in Europe, the signalling for an entire area was condensed into a single large power signal box with a control panel in the operator's area and the equivalent of a telephone exchange in the floors below that combined the vital relay based interlocking logic and non-vital control logic in one place. Such advanced schemes would also include train describer and train tracking technologies. Away from complex terminals unit lever control systems remained popular until the 1980s when solid state interlocking and control systems began to replace the older relay plants of all types.

=== Electronic interlocking ===
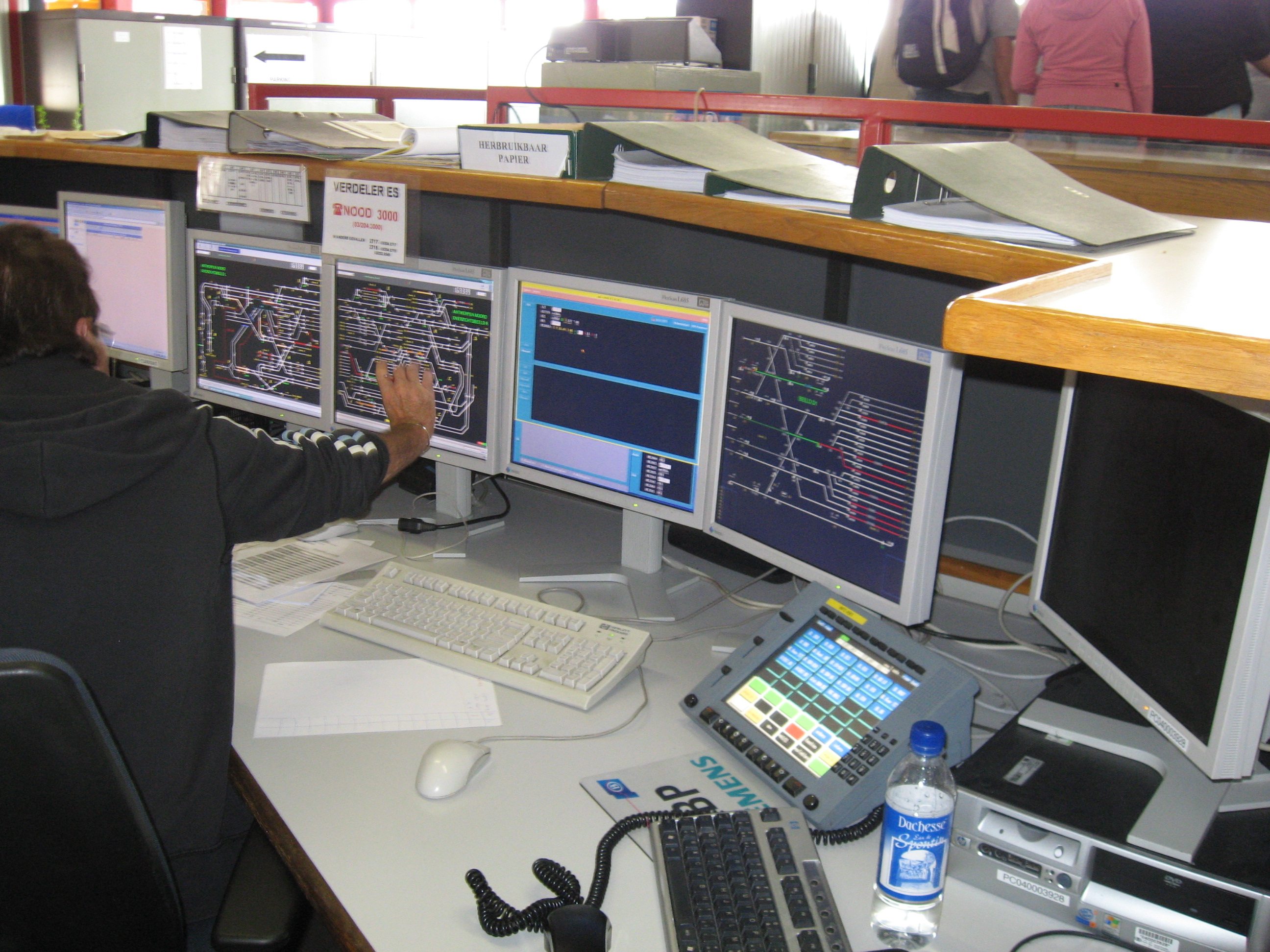
Computer-based controls for a modern electronic interlocking

Modern interlockings (those installed since the late 1980s) are generally solid state, where the wired networks of relays are replaced by software logic running on special-purpose control hardware. The fact that the logic is implemented by software rather than hard-wired circuitry greatly facilitates the ability to make modifications when needed by reprogramming rather than rewiring. In many implementations, this vital logic is stored as firmware or in ROM that cannot be easily altered to both resist unsafe modification and meet regulatory safety testing requirements. As display technology improved, the hard wired physical devices could be updated with visual display units (computer monitors), which allowed changes in field equipment be represented to the signaller without any hardware modifications.

"Solid State Interlocking" (SSI) is the brand name in trade of work of the first generation microprocessor-based interlocking developed in the 1980s by British Rail, GEC-General Signal and Westinghouse Signals Ltd in the UK. Second generation processor-based interlockings are known by the term Computer Based Interlocking (CBI), of which VPI (trademark of General Railway Signal, now Alstom), MicroLok (trademark of Union Switch & Signal, now Hitachi Rail STS), Westlock and Westrace (trademarks of Invensys Rail, now Siemens), Smartlock (trademark of Alstom), and EBI Lock (trademark of Bombardier) are examples.

== Defined forms of locking ==
Electric locking
"The combination of one or more electric locks or controlling circuits by means of which levers in an interlocking machine, or switches or other devices operated in connection with signalling and interlocking, are secured against operation under certain conditions."

Section locking
"Electric locking effective while a train occupies a given section of a route and adapted to prevent manipulation of levers that would endanger the train while it is within that section."

Route locking
"Electric locking taking effect when a train passes a signal and adapted to prevent manipulation of levers that would endanger the train while it is within the limits of the route entered."

Sectional route locking
"Route locking so arranged that a train, in clearing each section of the route, releases the locking affecting that section."

Approach locking
"Electric locking effective while a train is approaching a signal that has been set for it to proceed and adapted to prevent manipulation of levers or devices that would endanger that train."

Stick locking
"Electric locking taking effect upon the setting of a signal for a train to proceed, released by a passing train, and adapted to prevent manipulation of levers that would endanger an approaching train."

Indication locking
"Electric locking adapted to prevent any manipulation of levers that would bring about an unsafe condition in case a signal, switch, or other operated device fails to make a movement corresponding with that of the operating lever; or adapted directly to prevent the operation of one device in case another device, to be operated first, fails to make the required movement."

Check locking or traffic locking
"Electric locking that enforces cooperation between the Operators at two adjacent plants in such a manner that prevents opposing signals governing the same track from being set to proceed at the same time. In addition, after a signal has been cleared and accepted by a train, check locking prevents an opposing signal at the adjacent interlocking plant from being cleared until the train has passed through that plant."

== Complete and incomplete interlockings (U.S. terminology) ==
Interlockings allow trains to cross from one track to another using a turnout and a series of switches. Railroad terminology defines the following types of interlockings as either complete or incomplete depending on the movements available. Although timetables generally do not identify an interlocking as one or the other, and rule books do not define the terms, the terms below are generally agreed upon by system crews and rules officials.

Complete interlockings
allow continuous movements from any track on one side of the interlocking to any track on the opposite side without the use of a reverse move within the limits of the interlocking. This is true even if there are differing numbers of tracks on opposing sides, or if the interlocking has multiple sides.

Incomplete interlockings
do not allow such movements as described above. Movements in an incomplete interlocking may be limited and may even require reverse movements to achieve the desired route.

== See also ==
- Fail-safe
- Interlock (Engineering)
- Lockout-tagout
- Safety instrumented system
- Signalling control
