= Westinghouse Brake and Signal Company =

Anglo-Australian railway parts manufacturer

The Westinghouse Brake & Signal Company Ltd
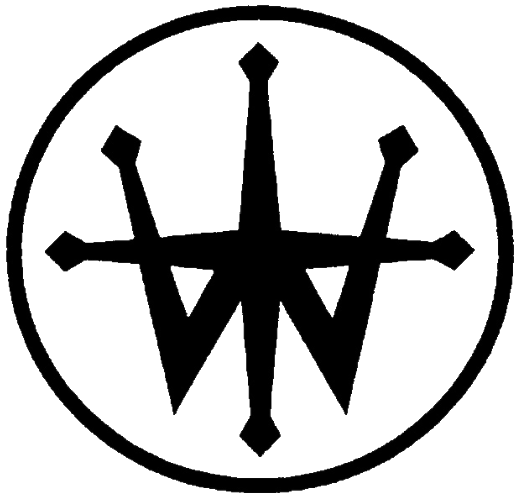
- Formerly: Westinghouse Brake Company (1881–1920); Westinghouse Brake & Saxby Signal Company (1920–35)
- Company type: Private (1881–1920); Public limited company (1920–1979); Subsidiary (1979–present)
- Industry: Transport
- Founded: 1881
- Founder: George Westinghouse (as Westinghouse Air Brake Company); Evans O'Donnell; John Saxby; John Stinson Farmer
- Defunct: 1980
- Fate: Acquired by Hawker Siddeley in 1979, then other owners, becoming a brand.
- Successors: Siemens Mobility (signalling); Knorr-Bremse (braking)
- Headquarters: Chippenham, England
- Area served: Worldwide
- Products: Railway air brakes, signalling
- Owner: Hawker Siddeley (1979–1992); BTR plc (1992–1999); Invensys (1999–2000); Knorr-Bremse (2000–present)

The Westinghouse Brake & Signal Company Ltd was a British manufacturer of railroad signs. Founded by George Westinghouse, it was registered as "Westinghouse Brake Company" in 1881. The company reorganised in 1920, associating with Evans O'Donnell, and Saxby and Farmer which merged to form the "Westinghouse Brake & Saxby Signal Company". The 'Saxby' would be dropped from their title in 1935.

For most of the 20th century, Westinghouse manufactured air brakes, signalling, mining & colliery equipment, industrial automation and power rectifier equipment in the engineering works in Chippenham, Wiltshire, England and Melbourne, Australia. There were associate companies in South Africa (Saxby & Farmer Private) and India. The company's main factory of around 35 acres was located immediately north-east of Chippenham railway station on the Great Western Railway.

== History ==
=== Beginning and development ===
The railway air brake was patented in the United States by George Westinghouse in 1869 (straight air brake) and 1872 (automatic air brake), establishing the Westinghouse Air Brake Company.

Predecessors of the British company included Evans O'Donnell Limited and Saxby and Farmer. Saxby and Farmer was started by John Saxby and John Stinson Farmer in the mid-19th century as pioneers in the manufacture of railway signalling equipment. In 1875 Saxby and Farmer had developed a mechanical linked braking system, which connected vehicles to brake simultaneously. In 1920, Saxby, Farmer and Evans O'Donnell merged to form the Westinghouse Brake & Saxby Signal Company Ltd.

=== Sale and successors ===
In 1979, the company was acquired by Hawker Siddeley. BTR plc then bought Westinghouse Brake and Signal in 1992. In 1999, BTR merged with Siebe plc to form "BTR Siebe plc", later renamed "Invensys".

Invensys quickly split the company into two divisions, Westinghouse Rail Systems and Westinghouse Brakes Ltd, selling Westinghouse Brakes to Munich-based competitor Knorr-Bremse.

Also formerly a part of The Westinghouse Brake & Signal Company is Westcode, a high-power semiconductor manufacturer, now part of the IXYS Corporation.

On 2 May 2013, the acquisition of Invensys Rail by Siemens was successfully completed. On 1 July 2013, the new company name for Invensys Rail Limited became 'Siemens Rail Automation Limited', with Westinghouse Brake & Signal Holdings becoming Siemens Rail Automation Holdings Limited. With this, the Westinghouse name disappeared from the railway signalling industry. Several years later, Siemens announced that it planned to merge its rail assets, including the former Westinghouse Signal business, with Alstom.

== Operations ==
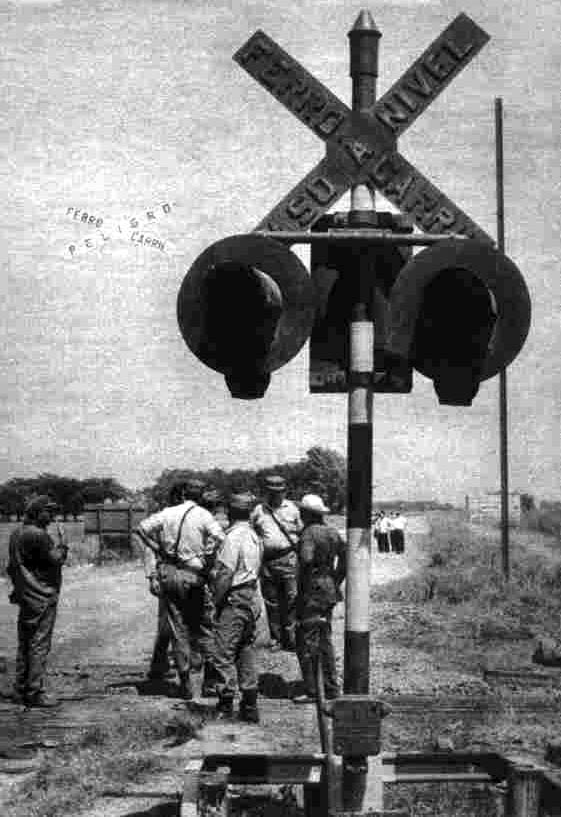
Westinghouse level crossing sign device in Santa Fe Province, Argentina, pictured in 1978

There were also factories in Kingswood, Bristol (Douglas Ltd – formerly Douglas Motorcycles then Douglas Vespa and vehicle air brake equipment), Hobbs Automatic Transmissions (epicyclic gearbox), Westcode Semiconductors (now IXYS Corporation) The main factory was east of Foundry Lane, Signal & Automation design offices as well as Brake Engineering, drawing offices and design/test laboratories on island site shared with Hugh Baird & Sons, Maltsters and the Wiltshire Bacon Company. The Rectifier Design Department was at Derriads House, some design offices opposite the main factory site, other test & development laboratories beyond the semiconductor site at Avon House, north of the main factory site.

On-site manufacturing capability covered every part of the engineering spectrum other than electron beam welding. There were acres of machine shops containing almost every variety of machine tool, extensive press shops, iron and non-ferrous foundries together with pattern shop and core shop, extensive drop-stamp forge, die-casting shops and tool room, tin-smiths' shop, copper oxide and selenium rectifier shops, electro-plating shop. The assembly and erection shops included wiring shops for signalling equipment, rectifier equipment, colliery equipment, railway signaling relays. The list is almost endless. Support activities included a well-equipped and staffed medical centre and apprentice training school and hostel. Apprentices fell into Trade, Craft, Technical, Student and Graduate categories.

The company had a works restaurant (overalls allowed), a staff restaurant (smartish dress), and a directors' restaurant, all of which were supplied from the company allotments outside the north gate (now a housing estate).

There was an immense amount of innovative work done. To name a few things, railway vacuum brakes, numerous mechanical, electrical and electronic signalling innovations. The company pioneered the use of S.G. Iron (spheroidal graphite) for crank shafts and other items (followed in this by Ford U.K.) and was the first to produce an all-electronic control & monitoring system (Westronic, in various "styles") initially for the railway market but then extending into oil, water, gas, electricity and sewage.

== Bibliography ==
The detailed history of the company from 1881 to 1981 was recorded in O. S. Nock's final book, 'A Hundred Years of Speed with Safety', not published until 2006 – many years after Nock's death. Nock, a prolific writer of railway books and magazine articles for many years, was the chief mechanical engineer for Westinghouse until his retirement in 1970. A second book, Westinghouse Brake & Signal in Photographs 1894 to 1981, was published by polunnio.co.uk in 2010, this not-for-profit project raising funds for the Chippenham Museum & Heritage Centre which holds a significant collection of documents and artefacts about the company. Other documentation is held at the Swindon & Wiltshire History Centre in the town.
