= Eurotherm =

British control and measurement instruments supplier

- Founded: 1965; 61 years ago; (as Eurotherm Controls)
- Area served: Europe and USA
- Owner: Independent (1965–98); Siebe plc (1998–99); Invensys Ltd. (1999–2014); Schneider Electric (2014-22); Watlow (2022–present)
- Website: www.eurotherm.com

Eurotherm is a supplier of control and measurement instruments to industrial and process markets. They are part of Watlow, an electricity distribution, automation management and producer of installation components for energy management company. Eurotherm manufacture at a number of locations in Europe and the USA.

On October 31, 2022, Eurotherm was bought by Watlow.

== History ==
The first Eurotherm company, Eurotherm Controls, was formed in 1965 at Worthing, West Sussex to manufacture temperature controllers. In 1970, the directors of the company set up a number of loosely related but independent companies to develop and produce other product lines. Chessell Ltd was created to manufacture data recorders, while Turnbull Control Systems (TCS) was formed to produce process control systems, and Shackleton System Drives (SSD) to produce variable speed electronic drives. All four companies marketed their offerings internationally, and in 1974 they were brought under an international holding company, Eurotherm International.

In 1978 the holding company went public and it became quoted on the London Stock Exchange in May of that year. By 1989, Eurotherm International controlled a network of subsidiaries and agents in the UK, USA, Switzerland, Germany, France, Hong Kong, Italy, Japan, Australia, Holland, Belgium, Scandinavia, Spain, Korea, India and Ireland. It was acquired by Siebe plc June 1998, later to become Invensys plc. Invensys was acquired by Schneider Electric in January 2014.

By the late 1990s, three key Eurotherm companies, Eurotherm Controls, Eurotherm Recorders (previously Chessell) and Eurotherm Process Automation (previously Turnbull Control Systems) amalgamated to form Eurotherm Limited.

In 2009 Eurotherm, along with the Invensys businesses Foxboro, IMServ Europe Ltd, Skelta, Triconex and Wonderware, formed Invensys Operations Management, a provider of automation and information technologies, systems, software, services and consulting on manufacturing and infrastructure.

In 2022, Watlow acquired Eurotherm from Schneider Electric, expanding the company’s presence in Europe and product offering in sophisticated thermal controls.

== Company overview ==
In the UK, design and assembly is carried out at the company's sites in Worthing, West Sussex. Product offerings fall into five main areas:

- Temperature and process controllers (including Industrial Indicators and using PID controllers)
- Data recorders and data acquisition systems
- Process automation
- Signal conditioning
- Power switching products manufactured by sister companies

Training and repair facilities are also provided. Eurotherm now manufacture their products in Worthing, UK; Milan, Italy and Tychy, Poland.
