= Don Freshwater =

British professor of chemical engineering

Donald Cole Freshwater (21 April 1924 – 2 August 2004), known as Don Freshwater, was a British professor of chemical engineering.

== Education ==
Freshwater was born in Brewood, where he attended the Grammar School. He gained a degree in chemistry at Birmingham University in 1944, then took a course in fuel technology at the University of Sheffield, a conversion course to chemical engineering at Loughborough College and a PhD at Birmingham in 1955.

== Career ==
Hired as a chemist he worked for the Ministry of Fuel and Power on industrial coke, which led him to take courses and convert to chemical engineering, working for APV and Midland Tar Distillers before going to Birmingham to lecture and take his PhD. In 1957, at the age of 33, he was appointed the head of the department of chemical engineering at Loughborough College of Advanced Technology, where he remained for 30 years, as the college changed to a university and his department grew in stature. Retiring from Loughborough, he took up a post at Louisiana State for ten years, receiving an Excellence in Teaching Award. He returned to the UK in 1996, and wrote a book on the history of the Institution of Chemical Engineers (IChemE).

== Life, honours and achievements ==
In 1950 he was a winner of the IChemE Junior Moulton Medal for the best paper by a member under 40 in an IChemE publication. In 1986 he was made a Fellow of the Royal Academy of Engineering and in 1990 received an honorary degree from Loughborough University, the first to one of its own staff. He served as a Parish Councillor in Mountsorrel and was Chairman of her Majesty the Queen’s Golden Jubilee Celebrations in the village. Donald Freshwater died 2 August 2004, survived by his wife, Eleanor.

== Publications ==
- D. C. Freshwater (1955) Bubble cap phenomena : a study of the mechanism of operation of bubble cap plates (PhD Thesis) University of Birmingham
- D. C. Freshwater (1997) "People, Pipes and Processes" IChemE, Rugby ISBN 0852953909
