= Davis Submerged Escape Apparatus =

Oxygen rebreather

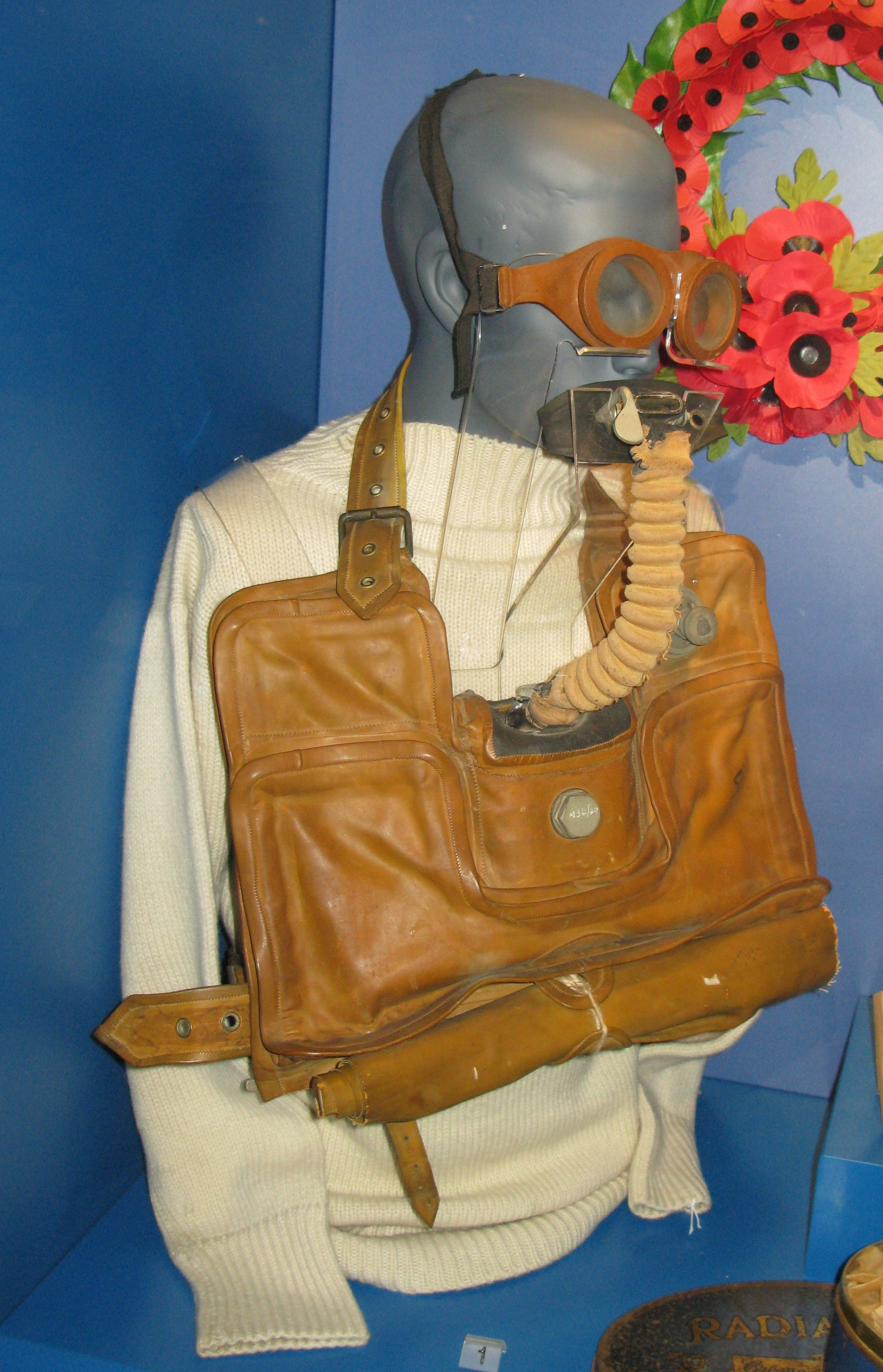
- A Davis Submerged Escape Apparatus
- Acronym: DSEA
- Uses: Oxygen rebreather for submarine emergency escape and diving
- Inventor: Sir Robert Davis, 1910
- Related items: Escape set

The Davis Submerged Escape Apparatus (also referred to as DSEA), was an early type of oxygen rebreather invented in 1910 by Sir Robert Davis, head of Siebe Gorman and Co. Ltd., inspired by the earlier Fleuss system, and adopted by the Royal Navy after further development by Davis in 1927. While intended primarily as an emergency escape apparatus for submarine crews, it was soon also used for diving, being a handy shallow water diving apparatus with a thirty-minute endurance, and as an industrial breathing set.

== Design ==
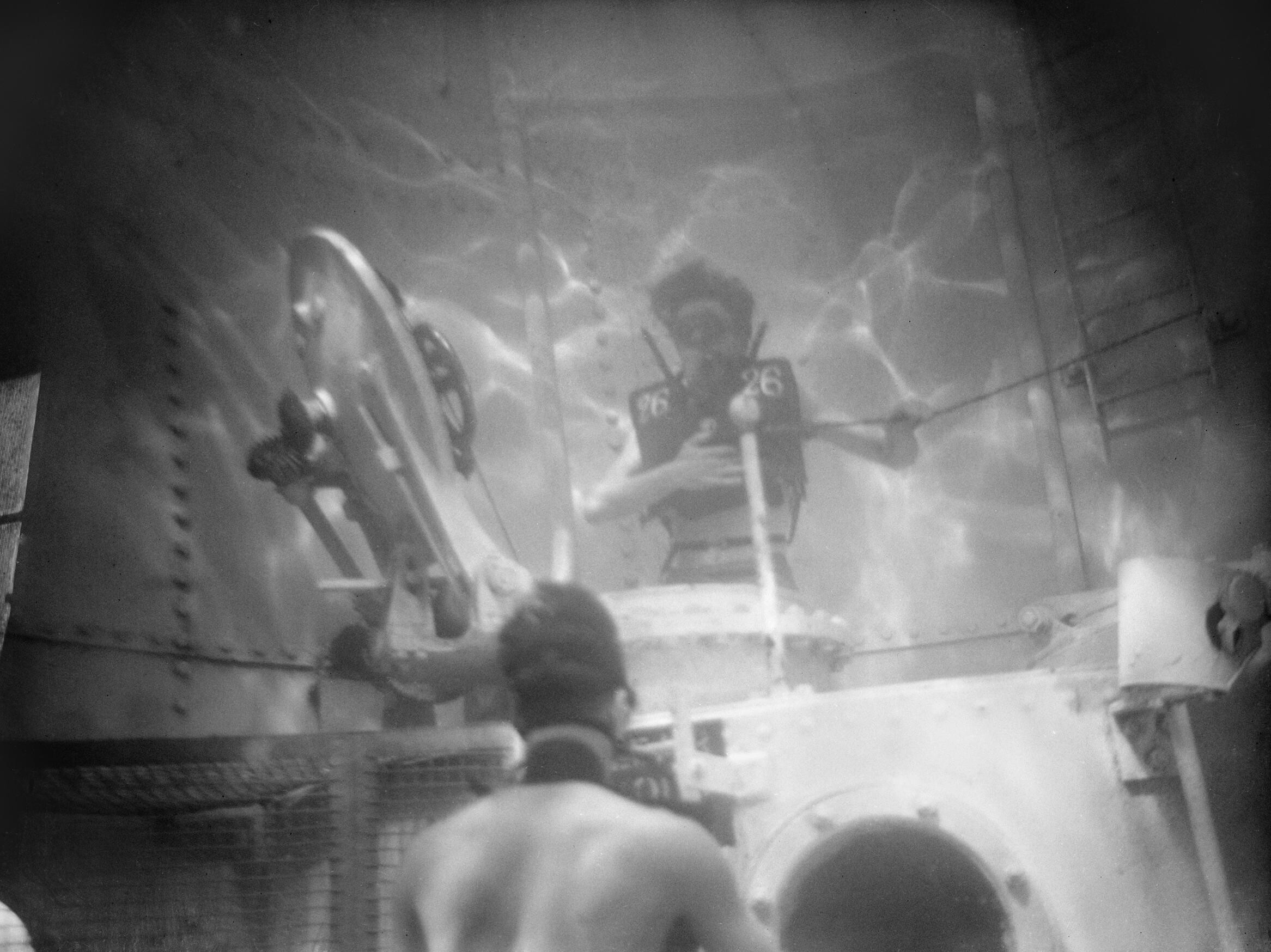
Davis breathing apparatus tested at the submarine escape test tank at HMS Dolphin, Gosport, 14 December 1942

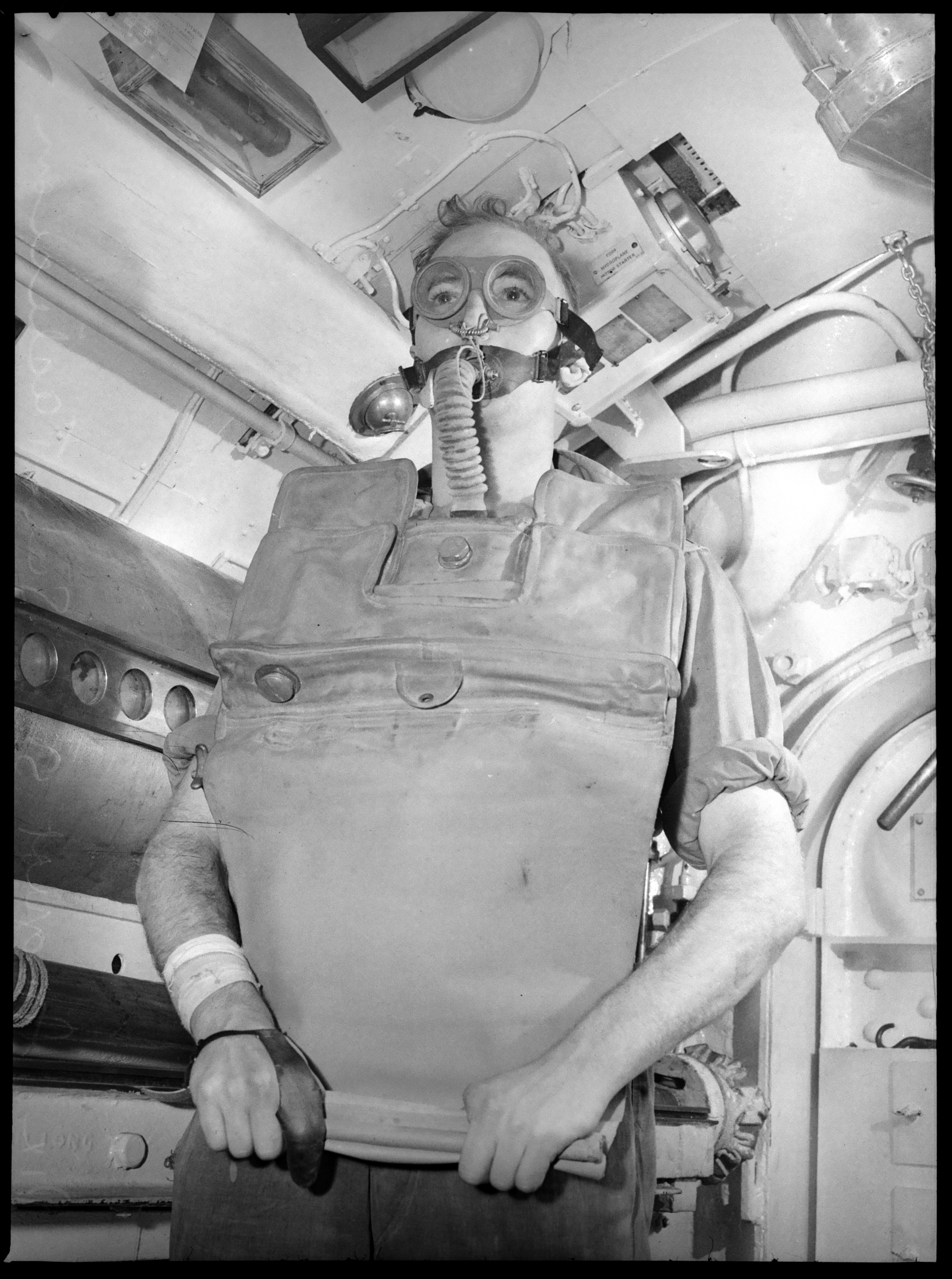
Sailor with Davis Submerged Escape Apparatus on submarine 'Tactician', 1950

The DSEA rig chiefly addressed the problem of anoxia threatening a person ascending through water, by providing oxygen; and the associated risk of lung over-pressure injury as underwater pressure reduces with reducing depth, which it addressed by managing oxygen pressures. It also provided assistance with buoyancy, both in the ascent and after reaching the surface. The risk of decompression illness due to ascending too fast could be addressed by associated equipment; any other escape requirements, such as means of summoning help once the surface was reached, were not considered.

The apparatus itself comprises a rubber breathing/buoyancy bag, which contains a canister of barium hydroxide to scrub exhaled CO_{2} and, in a pocket at the lower end of the bag, a steel pressure cylinder holding approximately 56 litres of oxygen at a pressure of 120 bar. The cylinder is equipped with a control valve and is connected to the breathing bag. Opening the cylinder's valve admits oxygen to the bag and charges it to the pressure of the surrounding water.

The canister of CO_{2} absorbent inside the breathing bag is connected to a mouthpiece by a flexible corrugated tube; breathing is through the mouth only, the nose being closed by a clip. Goggles are also provided as a standard part of the apparatus.

The breathing/buoyancy bag is fitted with a non-return release valve which allows air to escape from the bag as the user ascends towards the surface and the water pressure decreases. The wearer can close this valve on reaching the surface, the air in the breathing/buoyancy bag then serving as a life preserver. If the bag becomes deflated while the wearer is on the surface awaiting rescue, it can be refilled (for use as a lifejacket) by opening the non-return valve and blowing through the mouthpiece.

The usual Royal Navy DSEA rig also included an emergency buoyancy bag on the front of the main breathing/buoyancy bag to help keep the wearer afloat after reaching the surface even if he had exhausted the air in the breathing/buoyancy bag. This emergency bag was inflated by an "Oxylet" canister inside it - a small steel oxygen cylinder which was opened by breaking its weakened neck and wrenching sharply.

It also had a speed-retarding drogue, which was a rubber apron unrolled and held out horizontally by the wearer as he ascended, dramatically reducing his speed of ascent through water resistance to avoid decompression illness.

== Operational service ==
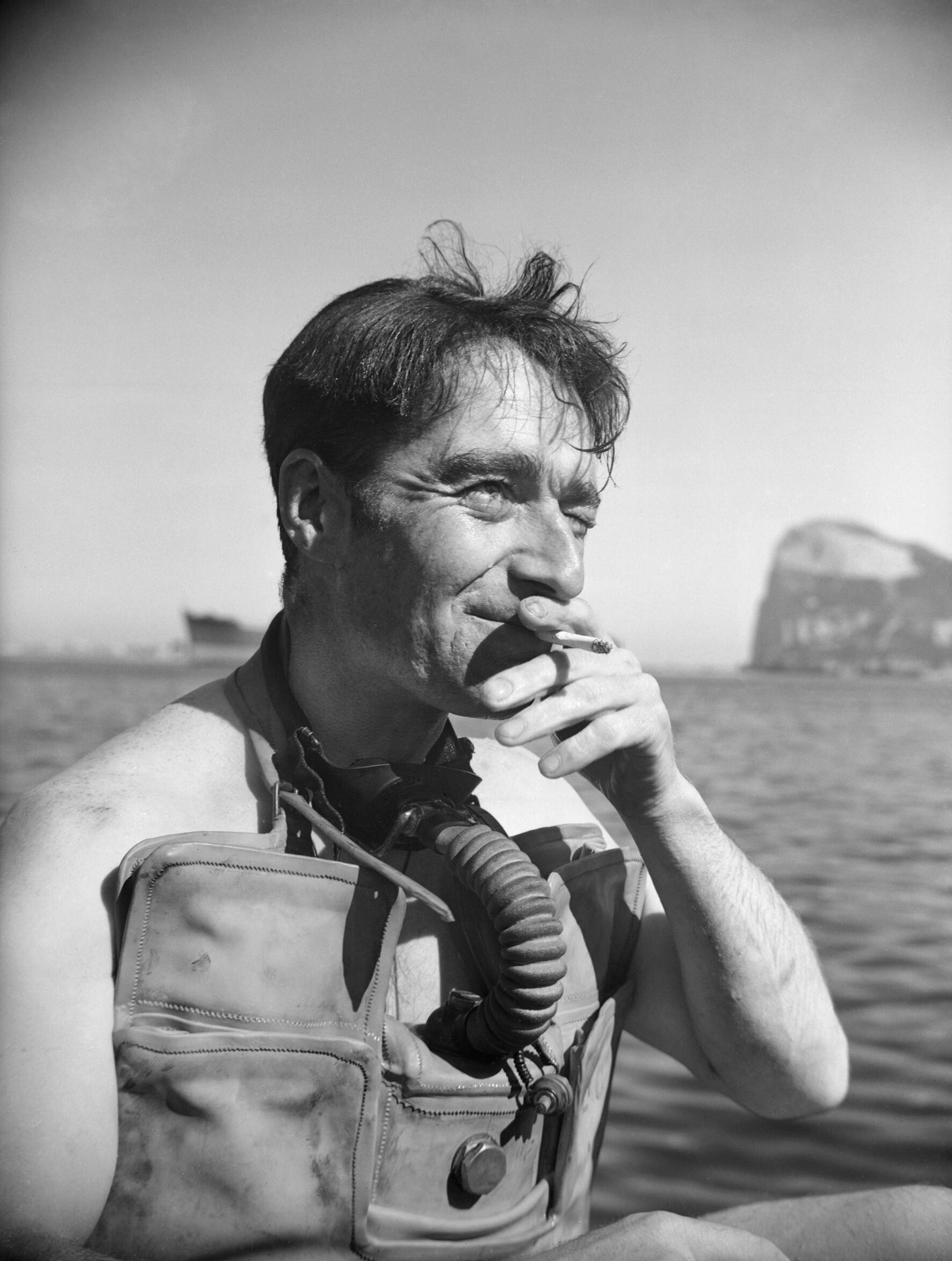
Lt. Lionel 'Buster' Crabb, RNVR, using the DSEA at Gibraltar in April 1944.

Adopted by the Royal Navy in 1929, DSEA was used with limited success to assist crew members to escape from several sunken submarines, for example HMS Poseidon in 1931, HMS Thetis in 1939 and HMS Perseus in 1941.

A small version of the DSEA, the Amphibious Tank Escape Apparatus (ATEA) was produced for use by the crews of amphibious DD tanks such as those used during the Normandy landings.

There were instances, mostly during WWII, of the DSEA being used for swimming down from the surface, i.e. for early scuba diving. In WWII it was also notably used by the Underwater Working Party at Gibraltar led by Lt. Lionel "Buster" Crabb, and worn at times by frogmen piloting 'Sleeping Beauty' Motorised Submersible Canoes.

== See also ==
- Escape set – Self contained breathing apparatus providing gas to escape from a hazardous environment
