= Safetran =

American former railroad equipment manufacture

Safetran Systems Corporation
- Type: Subsidiary
- Industry: Engineering
- Founded: 1920
- Defunct: 2013
- Fate: Acquired by Invensys Rail Group, then taken over by Siemens
- Headquarters: Louisville, Kentucky, US
- Area served: North and South America, Europe, Asia.
- Key people: J. Heimann (General Manager)
- Products: Switch machines, railway signalling, level crossing signals
- Parent: Invensys Rail Group

Safetran Systems Corporation was an American company that manufactured switch machines, railroad wayside signal systems, rail transit signaling and rail-highway level crossing active warning systems.

The company was a major supplier of freight/commuter rail and transit signal systems with projects on CSX, Norfolk Southern, Union Pacific, BNSF, Canadian National Railway, Amtrak, MBTA, Metra, Metrolink, Metropolitan Transit, New Jersey Transit, New York City Transit, SEPTA, Metropolitan Transportation Authority and others.

== History ==
Safetran was founded in 1920 when Safetran's predecessors started developing and fielding products for the growing railroad infrastructure (See Timeline of United States railway history for details about the significant development of the United States' rail infrastructure.)

Safetran previously owned Burco Services which provides warehousing, purchasing, packaging, pre-assembly and total "logistics management" for construction projects. In July 1984, Hawker Siddeley purchased a 40% shareholding.

The company was headquartered in Louisville, Kentucky. Safetran was part of Invensys Rail Systems; however, Siemens acquired the rail company officially in April 2013.

The whole Invensys company (excluding the Invensys Rail division that owned Safetran) was acquired by Schneider Electric in July 2013.

== Significant applications ==
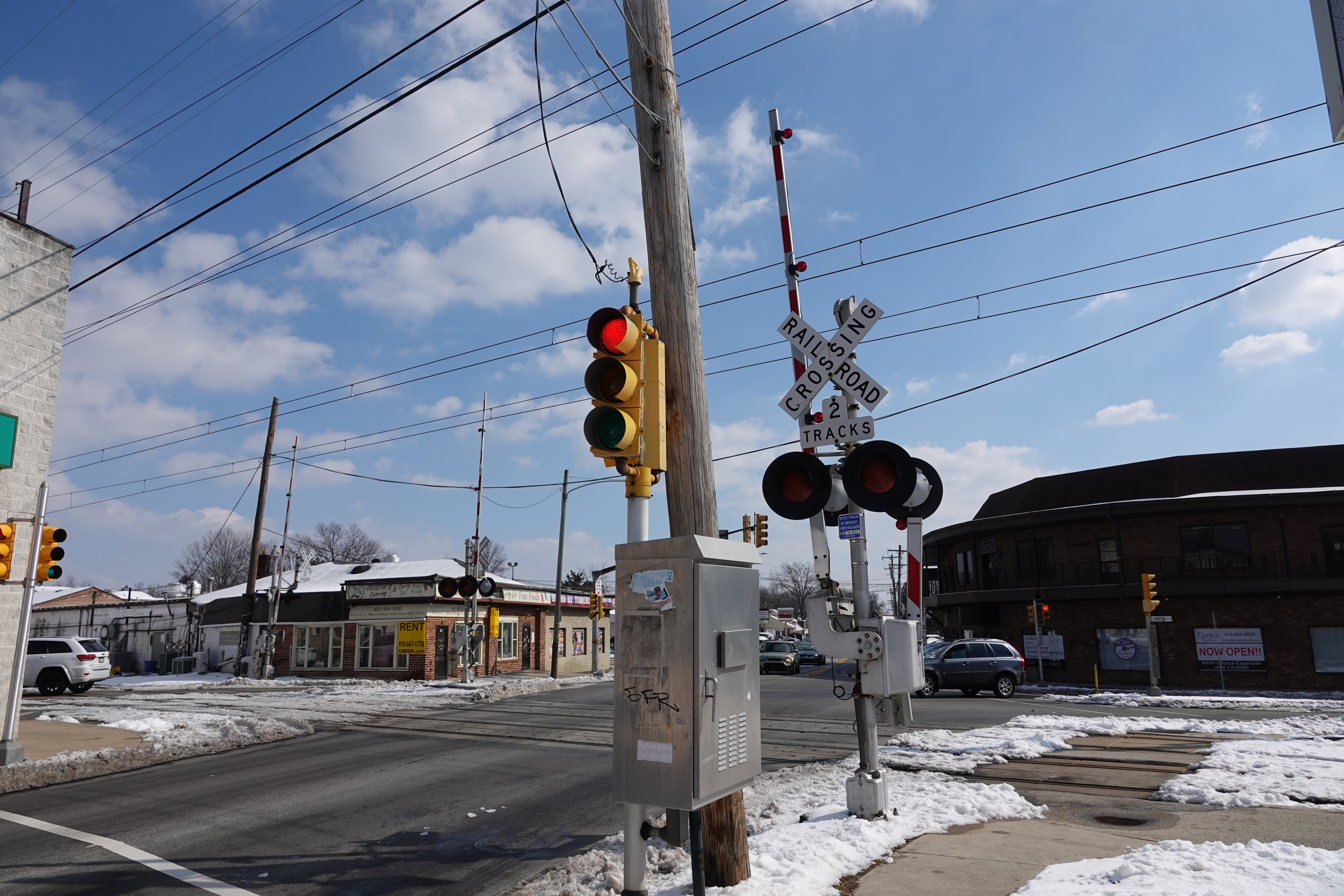
Safetran level crossing signals in Morton, Pennsylvania, 2021

- The Northeast Corridor of the United States utilizes hardware and software developed with the Alstom corporation to offer an Advanced Civil Speed Enforcement System solution for Amtrak services along the Corridor.
- The Brighton park crossing and Pershing Main interlocks utilize Safetran's Grade crossing predictor hardware and software, modernizing one of Chicago's many historic (and increasingly obsolete) crossings.
- The city of Placentia, California implemented a Quiet Zone utilizing Safetran Grade Crossing Predictors, Wayside Access Gateways, Spread Spectrum Radios, and Home/Distant Link hardware and software.
- Long Island Rail Road is implementing Safetran's Vital Interface Unit (VIUs) to implement Positive Train Control (PTC) along the two lines which span Long Island as part of a consortium upgrade of signaling headed by Bombardier Inc. and Siemens. The Metropolitan Transportation Authority is implementing Safetran's PTC as part of the need to upgrade the two largest commuter rail lines in the United States to increase locomotive speeds, provide additional train stations, and address the growing number of commuters.

== Major United States offices ==
- Marion, Kentucky
- Jacksonville, Florida
- Rancho Cucamonga, California
- Louisville, Kentucky
- Lee's Summit, Missouri

== Safetran Traffic Co ==
The Colorado company named "Safetran Traffic" shares the same company logo as Safetran the rail supplier company, however while the two companies shared a common history, Safetran Traffic split from the parent Safetran Corporation, operating independently.

Safetran Traffic is part of the Anaheim, California-based company Econolite since 2006.
