= Invensys Rail Group =

Invensys Rail Group was a division of Invensys, a UK-based multinational engineering company. It was a designer, manufacturer and integrator of railway equipment, including automation, signalling and controls. The group was headquartered in Chippenham, Wiltshire, and as of 2005, had over 2,750 employees in 14 locations internationally. It operated through four companies:

- Invensys Rail Dimetronic (Spain, Portugal and Latin America);
- Westinghouse Rail Systems (UK); and
- Invensys Rail Systems Australia incorporating Westinghouse Signals Australia and Foxboro Transportation, now known collectively as WRSA (Westinghouse Rail Systems Australia).
- Safetran Systems Corp (USA)

Westinghouse Rail Systems Ltd (WRSL) (UK) was previously known as Westinghouse Signals Ltd and before that was part of Westinghouse Brake and Signal Company, named after inventor George Westinghouse.

The other part of Westinghouse Brake and Signal Company, Westinghouse Brakes Ltd, was sold by Invensys to Knorr-Bremse, and has since left the Chippenham site to set up in the nearby town of Melksham.

On 28 November 2012, Invensys agreed to sell its rail arm to Siemens AG for £1.7bn. The sale was completed on 2 May 2013, and the group was amalgamated with the Siemens’ Rail Automation Business Unit in the Mobility and Logistics Division, which in turn a part of Infrastructure & Cities sector of Siemens.
