= Robert Davis (inventor) =

English inventor and manufacturer of underwater breathing apparatus

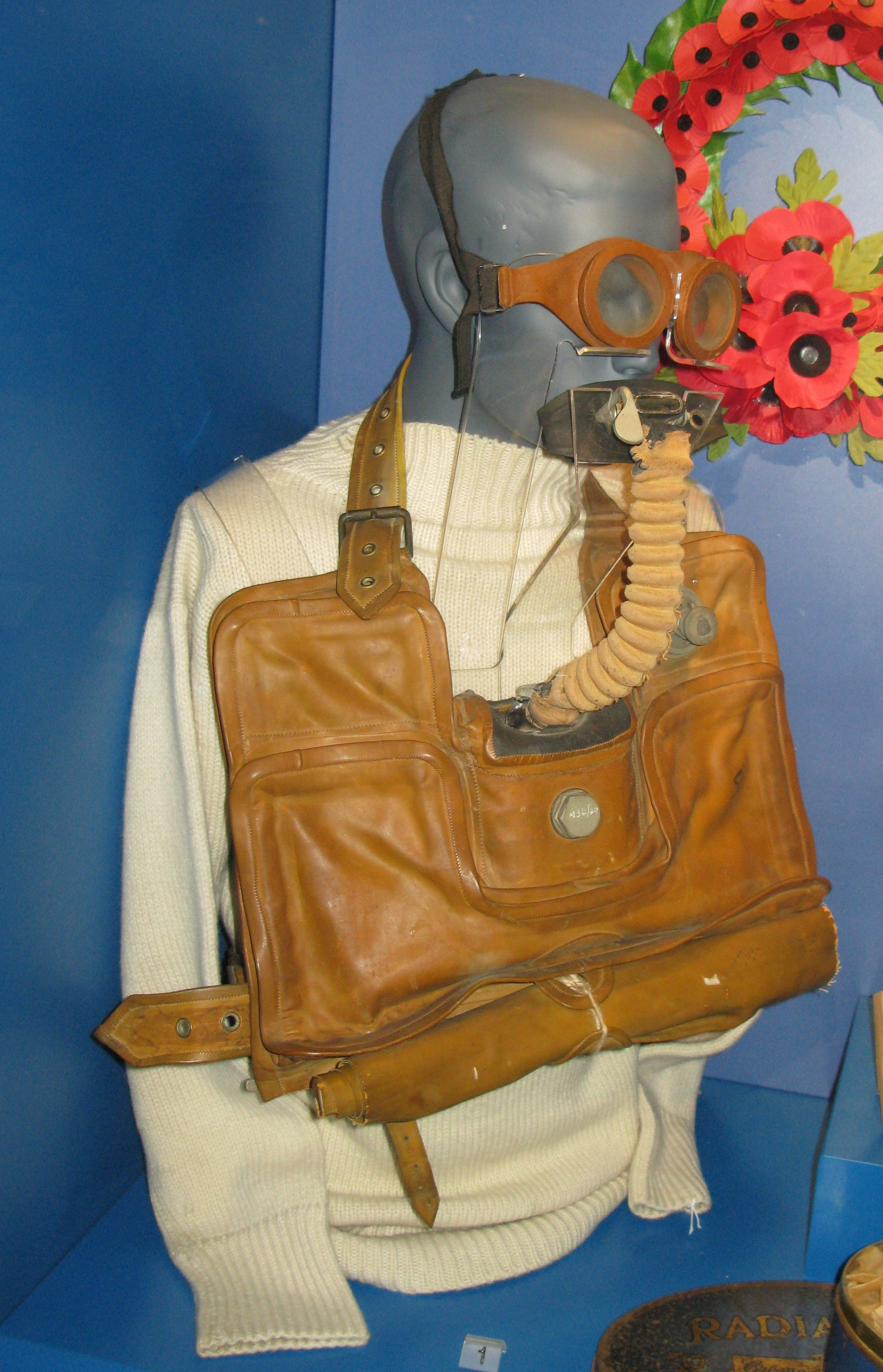
A Davis Submerged Escape Apparatus.

Sir Robert Henry Davis (1870 – 1965) was an English inventor and director of the Siebe Gorman company. His main invention was the Davis Submerged Escape Apparatus, an oxygen rebreather that Davis patented for the first time in 1910, inspired by the rebreathers that Henry Fleuss patented as of 1876. Davis breathing set was destined to allow British submarine crews to escape when their ship started to sink.

While Davis was still directing Siebe Gorman, it was the first British company to buy a licence for the Cousteau-Gagnan "Aqua-Lung" from the French company La Spirotechnique which started commercialization of scuba sets in Britain as of 1948. Siebe Gorman aqualungs ended being known under the name of "tadpole sets".

Davis Road in Chessington (where Siebe Gorman's factory was for a while) was named after him.

== Publications ==
He wrote the books:

- Diving Scientifically and Practically Considered. Being a Diving Manual and Handbook of Submarine Appliances, first edition 1909, published by Siebe, Gorman & Co., Ltd. in London.
- A Diving Manual and Handbook of Submarine Appliances, second edition 1919, published by Siebe, Gorman & Co., Ltd. in London.
- Breathing in Irrespirable Atmospheres, and in some cases, also underwater, first published 1948 by St. Catherine Press, Ltd in London. It has 376 pages, c.250 photographs, and diagrams.
- Davis, RH (1955). Deep Diving and Submarine Operations, a Manual for Deep Sea Divers and Compressed Air Workers (6th ed.). Tolworth, Surbiton, Surrey: Siebe Gorman & Company Ltd. p. 693. 4th edition, published 1935.
