= Watlow =

American manufacturing company

Watlow Electric Manufacturing Company
- Type: Private
- Founded: 1922; 104 years ago
- Headquarters: St. Louis, Missouri, United States
- Key people: Peter Desloge (Chairman and CEO), Steve Desloge (CFO)
- Products: Industrial electric heaters, sensors, and controllers
- Number of employees: 2,000 (2018)
- Website: www.watlow.com

Watlow Electric Manufacturing Co. is an American family-owned company that designs and manufactures industrial electric heaters, sensors, and controllers.

Watlow serves numerous industries, including semiconductor processing, environmental chambers, energy processes, diesel emissions, along with medical and foodservice equipment. Founded in 1922, it has nine factories and three technology centers in the United States, Mexico, Europe and Asia, and has sales offices in 16 countries.

== History ==
In 1922, Louis Desloge Sr. of the Desloge family founded Watlow in a rented corner space on the second floor of a machine shop in St. Louis, Missouri, and began manufacturing electric heating elements for the shoe industry. The name Watlow refers to the “low-watt” heaters that replaced steam heat.

During the 1930s and 1940s, Watlow began selling products outside the United States. Louis' sons Louis Jr. and George Desloge joined the company. A few years later, George invented the FIREROD cartridge heater. The first swaged cartridge heater, the patented device greatly increased heat transfer efficiency. Together, the Desloges expanded Watlow’s headquarters and St. Louis manufacturing facility to 185,000 square feet. During the mid-1970s, the company introduced the industry's first thermocouple product. Shortly after this time, Watlow grew exponentially both globally and domestically, adding facilities in Kronau, Germany, and Columbia, Missouri; and acquiring the Claud S. Gordon Company of Richmond, Illinois, the nation’s leading manufacturer of temperature measurement devices. In 1997, Watlow celebrated its 75th anniversary in the thermal products industry.

In 2000, Watlow Batavia Inc., then a subsidiary of Watlow, settled a lawsuit brought by the U.S. Equal Employment Opportunity Commission over the company's English-only policy. The company had fired eight Spanish-speaking workers. The EEOC alleged that the firings amounted to unlawful discrimination based on national origin, and that Watlow Batavia Inc.'s workplace lacked the safety-related conditions that make an English-only policy permissible. Watlow Batavia Inc. paid $192,500, the largest settlement in the four years since the EEOC had started keeping track. Officials denied any company wrongdoing and said they were settling the suit only to avoid litigation. In 2010, the company sold Watlow Batavia to LV2 Equity Partners of Midland, Michigan.

In 2014, the company said it would turn its St. Louis facility into an "advanced technology center" by adding 30,000 square feet of new construction and renovating 56,000 square feet of the existing facility. In 2015, Watlow launched their new F4T with INTUITION, a touch-screen controller that combines the functions of several devices into one process control.

In 2021, a majority stake of Watlow was acquired by private investment firm Tinicum LP. The Desloge family still has a minority share of the company.

In 2022, Watlow acquired Eurotherm from Schneider Electric, expanding the company’s presence in Europe and product offering in sophisticated thermal controls.
