= John Saxby =

English railway engineer (1821–1913)

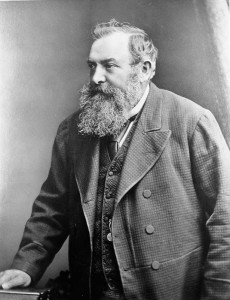
- Born: August 17, 1821; Brighton
- Died: April 22, 1913 (aged 91); Hassocks
- Occupation: Engineer
- Known for: Railway signalling
- Notable work: Interlocking system

John Saxby (17 August 1821 – 22 April 1913) was an English engineer from Brighton, noted for his work in railway signalling and the invention of the interlocking system of points and signals. He was later a partner in the firm Saxby and Farmer. He is regarded as "the father of modern signalling".

== Biography ==
Saxby was born at Brighton on 17 August 1821 and in 1834 was apprenticed at the age of thirteen to a carpenter and joiner. In 1840 he was employed as a carpenter at the Brighton railway works of the London and Brighton Railway to make oak mile-posts, and where he designed a tool to automate their production. He later became the foreman of the carpenters and joiners, sawyers, pattern makers, plumbers, gas-fitters, and labourers at the works.

== Railway signalling ==
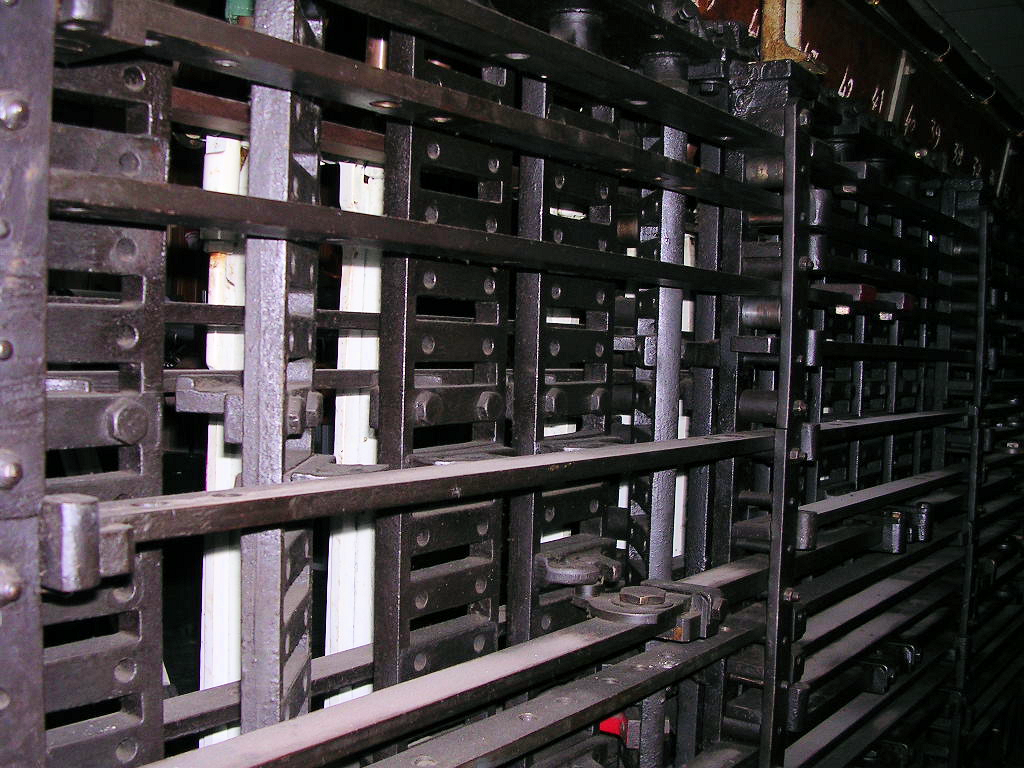
Saxby interlocking frame, preserved in France, Gare de Nîmes

Two accidents took place on the London Brighton and South Coast Railway (LBSCR) during the early 1850s due to signalling failures. Saxby became interested in railway safety and invented an improved signalling lamp, giving considerable benefits and savings on the lamps then in use. He also invented a device for interlocking points and signals.

In 1856 he was awarded a patent for this invention which was designed to act at once upon all the points and signals at a railway junction. Not only were the points and signals activated, but all the other signals in the system were locked against improper use.

The first interlocked signalling system was installed at the Bricklayers Arms junction, near the Old Kent Road in South London. It consisted of eight semaphore signals and six pairs of points controlling the routes in and out of London bridge Station and neighbouring goods yards, with linkages to a signal box.

== Saxby and Farmer ==
In 1861 Saxby left the railway employment and started his own business at Haywards Heath to manufacture signalling apparatus. The following year he was joined in partnership by John Stinson Farmer, who had previously been an assistant to the manager of the LBSCR. "Saxby and Farmer" became the leading manufacturers of railway signalling equipment and established a works at Kilburn where they eventually employed 3,000 workers. The firm also established works at Brussels.

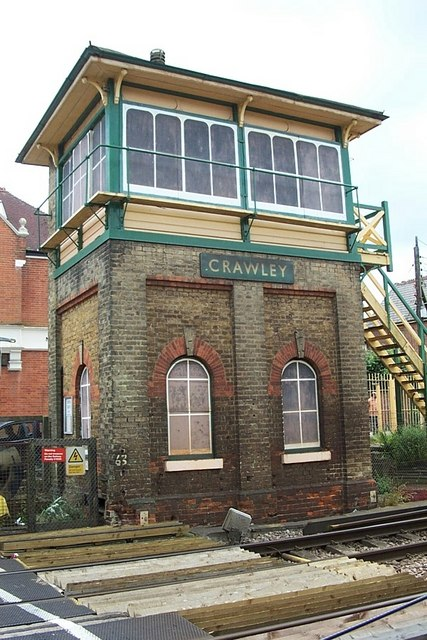
The signal box at Crawley built by Saxby and Farmer in 1877

In 1868 the company also constructed the world's first traffic signal for road traffic in London's George Street, working to the designs of the South-Eastern Railway engineer John Peake Knight.

In 1875 firm brought out its first mechanical brake, which gave more powerful braking by connecting each vehicle's brakes together. Saxby's son James established a signal works at Creil near Paris in 1878. From the 1860s to the 1880s Saxby and Farmer were the dominant force in railway signalling equipment manufacture. Much of the equipment they provided survived in use for the greater part of the twentieth century.

=== Signal boxes ===
Saxby and Farmer became the major contractor responsible for building signal boxes on behalf of railways. The Type 5 design was one of the most successful and long-lived of all contractors’ signal box designs, between 1876 and 1898 with eleven examples still in use on Network Rail and a further ten on heritage railways or otherwise preserved.

The partnership with Farmer ended in 1888 and the French works became part of John Saxby Ltd in 1889. In 1901 the British company that Saxby founded merged with several rivals to create the Westinghouse Brake and Signal Company Ltd. The French company is now part of United Technologies Corporation.

John Saxby died at Hassocks, Sussex, on 22 April 1913. He is commemorated with a modern plaque in Brighton Station.
