= Mark IV Amphibian =

British military oxygen rebreather

A Mark IV Amphibian is an early model of British naval oxygen rebreather made by Siebe Gorman. It was arranged like a UBA, but its oxygen cylinder is smaller. It was so called because it could be used for diving, or as an industrial breathing set on land.
