= Dennis Morin =

American entrepreneur and programmer (1946–2012)

- Born: Dennis Rene Morin; February 25, 1946; Saco, Maine, U.S.
- Died: December 31, 2012 (aged 66); Laguna Beach, Orange County, California, U.S.
- Occupations: Founder and CEO of Wonderware, 1987-1995
- Known for: Contributions in development of modern human machine interface (HMI) software; InTouch HMI and Wonderware

Dennis R. Morin (February 25, 1946 – December 31, 2012) was an American technology entrepreneur and programmer, based in Irvine, California. He co-founded the software firm Wonderware.

== Early life ==
Morin was born in Saco, Maine, a New England state, the oldest of six children of Alfred and Annette Morin. He spent his early childhood in Saco, and attended several colleges but never graduated. In the late 1960s, he moved to Boston where he drove a taxi for some time before finally moving to California.

== Career ==
In his early career, Morin worked as a project manager at a Georgia Pacific plant in Phoenix for a Watertown, Massachusetts-based company called Ionics. After moving to California in the late 1970s, he went on to work for many companies including Purex, Varco Oil and Tools, Hughes Aircraft and Triconex. He had no formal training in computer science or software programming; he learned everything on the job himself, with little help from his engineer colleagues. At Triconex he learned how to use the FIX and FactoryLink programs to create demos of the Tricon in action. Triconex was where Morin went deeper into the industrial automation business and his product-related ideas started taking shape.

In Morin's own words:

After using MacDraw to create all the specs for TriStation, I was appalled at how primitive and tedious it was and I had the insight that you could create an object-oriented graphics program like MacDraw where the visual properties of an object could be linked to changing data values. The Productivity implications of that were astounding compared to the approach used by the FIX and others.

After he was done with the TriStation design, Morin started working on TriView, a user interface. But, the Triconex board did not fund the project. In February 1986, during company re-organization Morin was laid off.

== Wonderware ==
After leaving Triconex, Dennis Morin worked as a consultant doing PLC programming and creating FIX applications. During this time, his exposure to FIX and its apparent limitations motivated Dennis to work on and develop something better. By early 1987, he had worked out most of the basic design concept of InTouch. He shared his idea with Phil Huber, his former colleague from Triconex, and asked him to join hands in building a software company. He also contacted other friends (Cole Chevalier, Jerry Cuckler and Bill Urone) to help him code the product. A partnership agreement was signed and Wonderware came into existence on April 1, 1987. 'Wonderware' was supposed to be temporary, but people liked the name and it stuck. It is said that Pinball Construction Set (1982) was the source of inspiration for Morin. With the release of InTouch in 1989, Wonderware revolutionized industrial automation. When Windows 3.0 was released on May 22, 1990, Wonderware introduced its HMI software, InTouch 2.0, the very same day. In fact, Wonderware was the beta tester for Windows 3.0.

InTouch was designed for Windows because Morin believed that Microsoft would eventually win the battle of operating systems. At that time, Apple’s operating system and IBM’s OS/2 were in a stronger position. Morin’s choice of betting his company’s future on the success of Windows paid off soon; Wonderware gained a significant lead over its competitors and remained almost unchallenged for five years.

== Legacy ==
In 2003, InTech, the magazine of the International Society of Automation (ISA), listed Dennis Morin as one of the 50 most influential innovators in the history of industrial automation. The organization noted that Morin ‘bet the company’ on Microsoft’s Windows software and started a major transition from dedicated, hardware-based process control to Windows-based ‘open’ technology.

Dennis Morin died on December 31, 2012, of cancer.
