= Augustus Siebe =

British engineer mostly known for his contributions to diving equipment

Christian Augustus Siebe
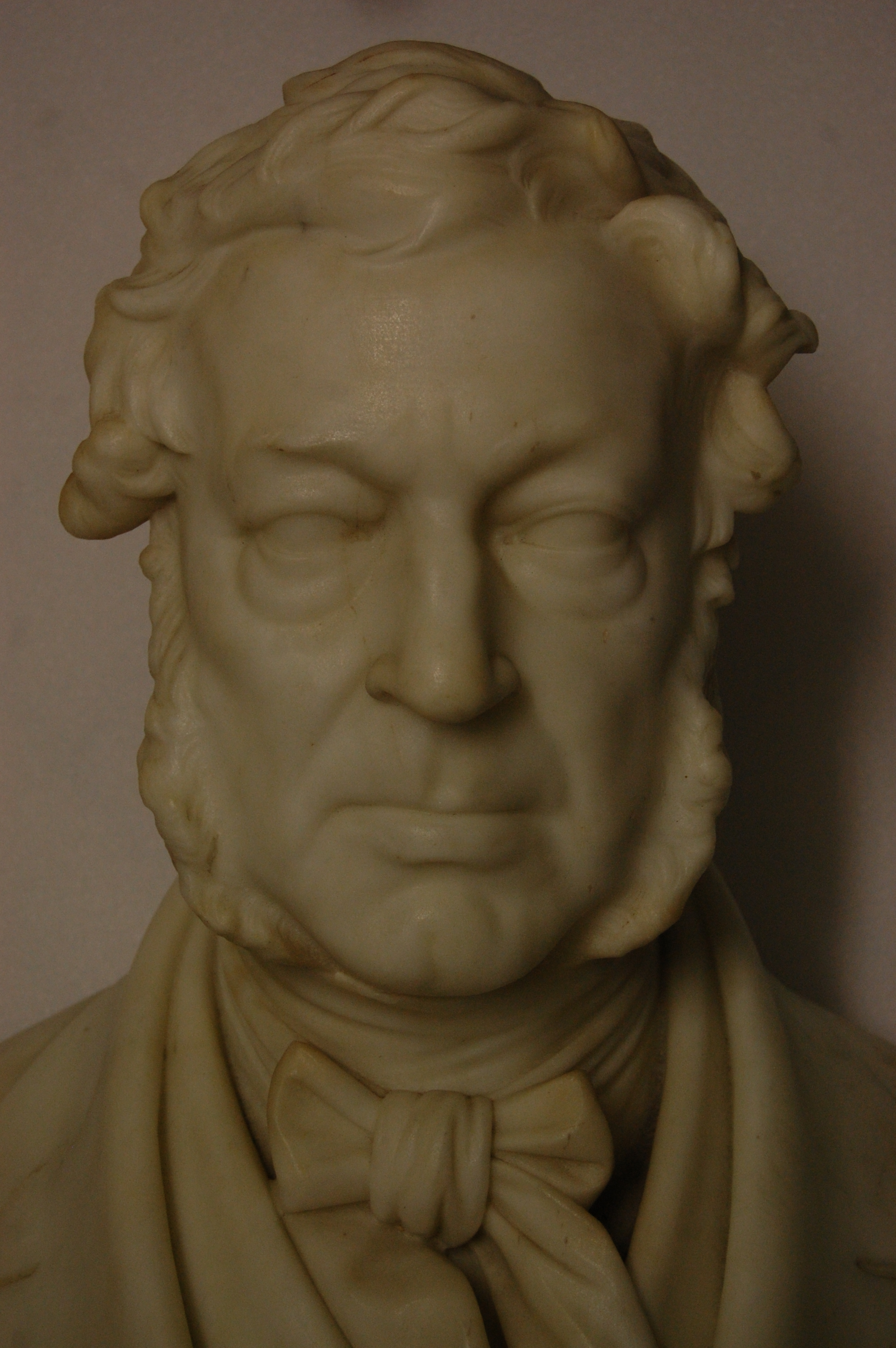
- Bust of Siebe, in the Science Museum's Blythe House store. It bears the inscription "A Siebe CE".
- Born: 1788; Saxony, Germany
- Died: 15 April 1872 (aged 83–84); At home (5, Denmark Street)
- Resting place: West Norwood Cemetery
- Organization: Siebe Gorman
- Known for: Innovations in diving apparatus
- Awards: Vulcan medal

Christian Augustus Siebe (known by his middle name; 1788 – 15 April 1872) was a British engineer chiefly known for his contributions to diving equipment.

== Contribution to diving ==
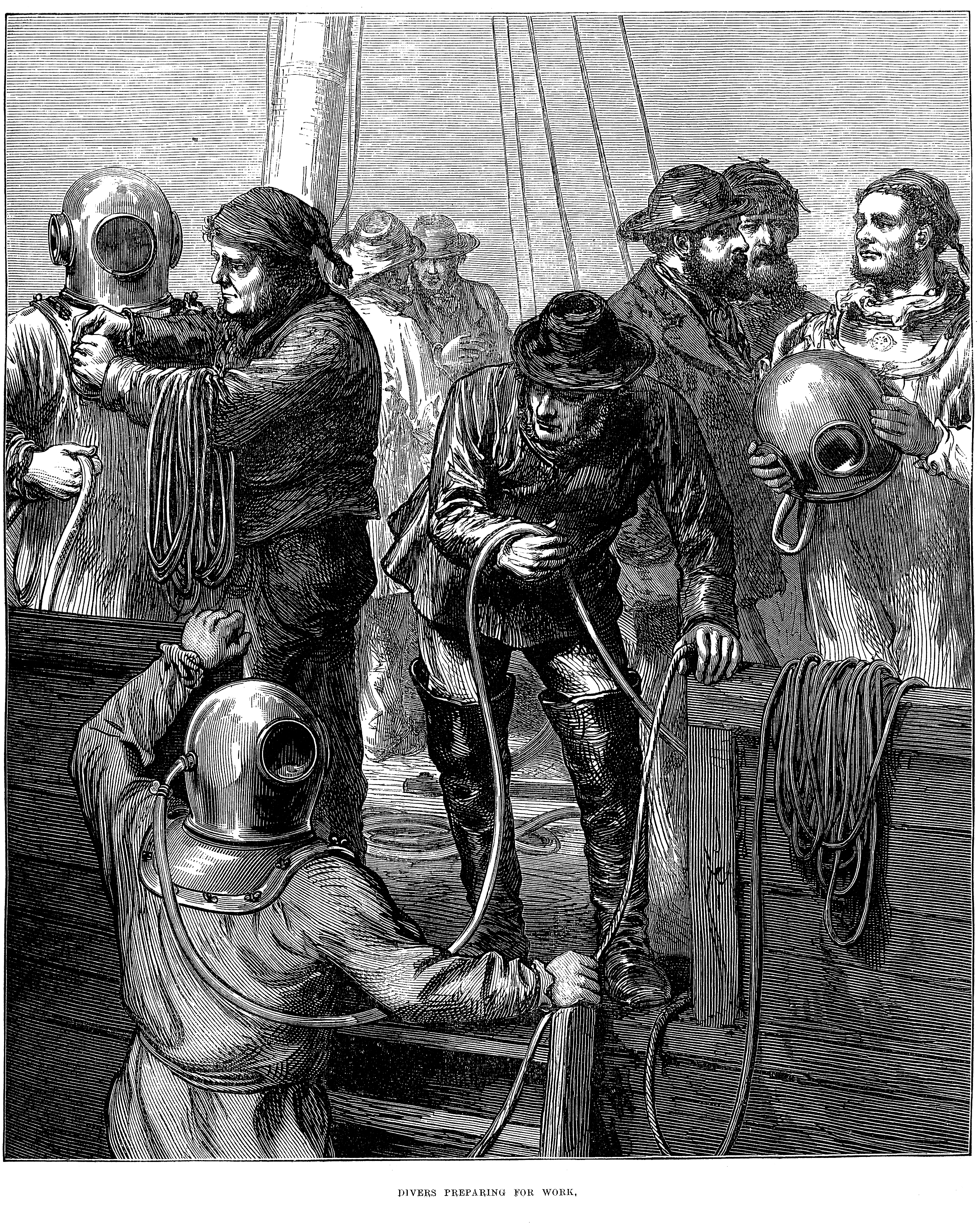
Siebe's design, as refined by 1873.

In the 1830s the Deane brothers asked Siebe to make a variation of their smoke helmet design for underwater use. Later they turned to him to produce more helmets for diving operations. Expanding on improvements already made by another engineer, George Edwards, Siebe produced his own design; a helmet fitted to a full length watertight canvas diving suit. The real success of the equipment was a valve in the helmet.

Colonel Charles Pasley, leader of the Royal Navy team that used Siebe's suit on the wreck of HMS Royal George suggested the helmet should be detachable from the corselet, giving rise to the typical standard diving dress which revolutionised underwater civil engineering, underwater salvage, commercial diving and naval diving.

The company that carried his name Siebe Gorman Ltd was founded by him and his son-in-law, Gorman.

He is commemorated by a blue plaque on his former home in Denmark Street, London.

== Other inventions ==
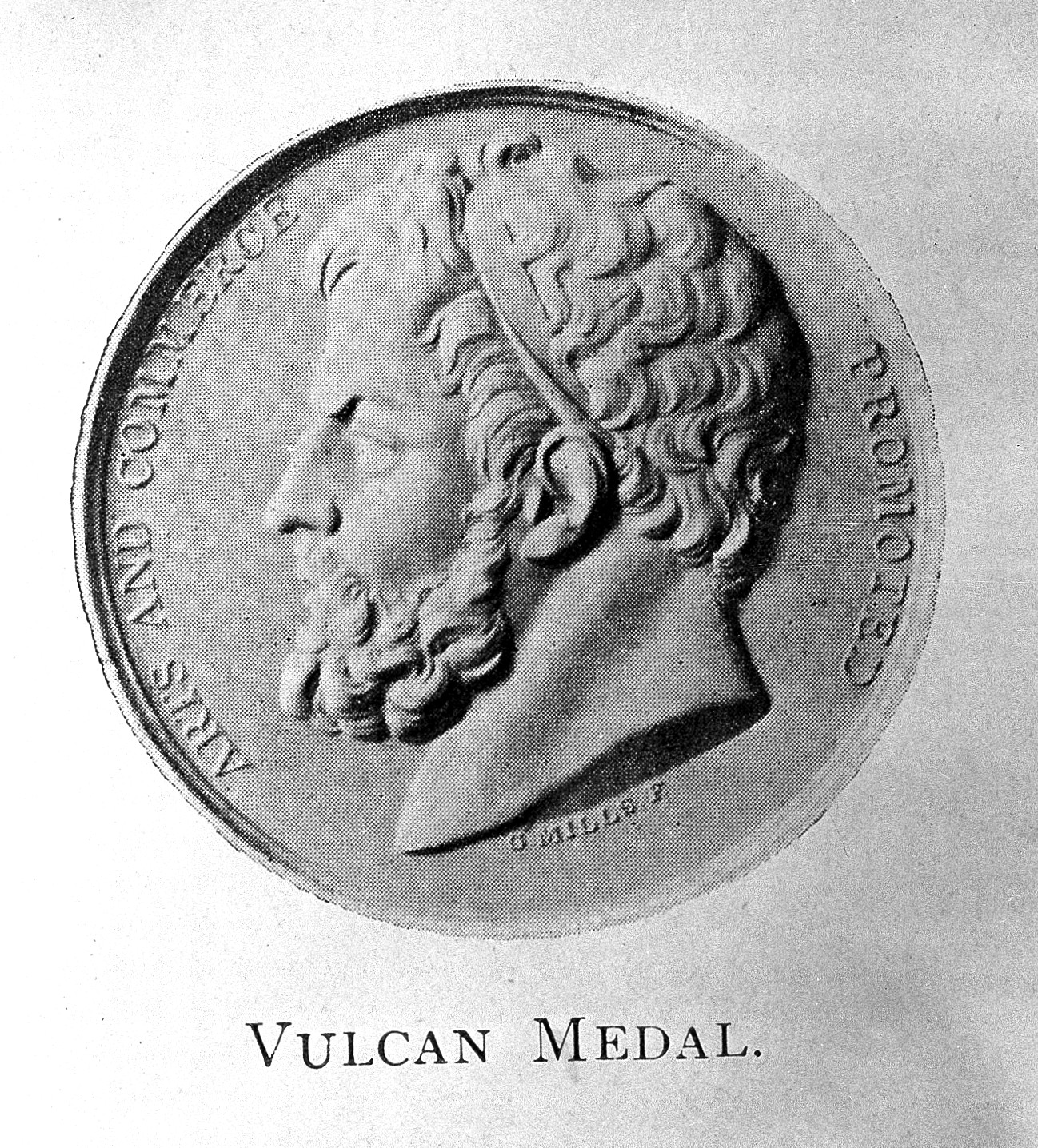
Vulcan medal from the Royal Society of Arts

Besides his contributions to diving he also invented:

- a rotating water pump patented in 1828,
- A paper making machine,
- a Dial weighing scale,
- an ice-making machine (with James Harrison).

In 1823, Siebe won the Vulcan medal from the Royal Society of Arts for an improved screw threading tool.

Siebe won many medals at the Great Exhibition in 1851 and the Paris Exhibition in 1855.

He died 15 April 1872 of chronic bronchitis, at his London home. He was buried at the West Norwood Cemetery.

== See also ==
- Siebe Gorman
