= Triconex =

Triconex is a Schneider Electric brand that supplies products, systems, and services for safety, critical control, and turbo-machinery applications. Triconex also use its name for its hardware devices that use its TriStation application software. Triconex products are based on patented Triple modular redundancy (TMR) industrial safety-shutdown technology. Today, Triconex TMR products operate globally in more than 11,500 installations.

== Company history ==
The history of Triconex was published in the book The History of a Safer World by Gary L. Wilkinson. The company was founded in September 1983 by Jon Wimer in Santa Ana, California and began operations in March 1984. The company was founded as a venture-capital funded private company. The business plan was written by Wimer and Peter Pitsker, an automation industry veteran and Stanford graduate. They presented the plan for a TMR (triple modular redundant) system named "Tricon" that would improve the safety and reliability of industrial applications. Among the customers they targeted were the petro-chemical giants, such as Exxon, Shell, Chevron, and BP.

Pitsker and Wimer presented the business plan to Los Angeles-based investor Chuck Cole, who was also a professor at USC. Cole was interested, so he contacted his personal attorney, future two-time Los Angeles Mayor Richard Riordan. Riordan agreed to invest $50,000 and Cole's venture capital team matched it, providing the seed money for Triconex. Wimer hired computer architect Ken Brody out of another computer manufacturer as Vice President of Research and Development and the number 2 employee. Ken Brody hired Wing N. Toy from Bell Labs. After two years, however, the company nearly failed due to the expense and complications of testing a new safety system. In February 1986, founder Wimer left the company and the board asked a seasoned executive, William K. Barkovitz, to become CEO; Barkovitz ended up leading the company for 9 years. At the end of his term, Triconex became the leading safety system in a market it largely created, made acquisitions, and completed an initial public offering. In January 1994, Triconex was acquired by British-based SIEBE for 90 million dollars.

The hardware architect of the company was Gary Hufton, and the software development manager was Glen Alleman. Along with Wing N. Toy (the lead engineer of the fault-tolerant ESS telephone switch), they led a small successful engineering team that built the first Tricon system, sold in June 1986. Soon after, Exxon became a customer and Honeywell agreed to distribute the Tricon. Among the software engineers who worked for Triconex were Phil Huber and Dennis Morin, who later left the company to found Wonderware.

== System ==
The Triconex system is based on the TMR patented technology that supports up to Safety Integrity Level 3 (SIL 3) and is usually used as a safety rather than a control system.

=== Operating theory ===
Fault tolerance in the Tricon is achieved by means of a Triple-Modular Redundant (TMR) architecture. The Tricon provides error-free, uninterrupted control in the presence of either hard failures of components, or transient faults from internal or external sources. The Tricon is designed with a fully triplicated architecture throughout, from the input modules through the Main Processors to the output modules. Every I/O module houses the circuitry for three independent legs. Each leg on the input modules reads the process data and passes that information to its respective Main Processor. The three Main Processors communicate with each other using a proprietary high-speed bus system called the TriBus. Once per scan, the three Main Processors synchronize and communicate with their two neighbors over the TriBus. The Tricon votes digital input data, compares output data, and sends copies of analog input data to each Main Processor. The Main Processors execute the user written application and send outputs generated by the application to the output modules. In addition to voting the input data, the TriBus votes the output data. This is done on the output modules as close to the field as possible to detect and compensate for any errors between the Tricon voting and the final output driven to the field.

=== Hardware ===
The Triconex system usually consists of the following typical modules:

- Main Processor modules (triple).
- Communication module(s) .
- Input and output modules: can be analog and/or digital and work singularly or in hot-spare (standby).
- Power supply modules (redundant).
- Backplane(s) (chassis) that can hold the previous modules.
- System cabinet(s): can compact one or more chassis in one cabinet.
- Marshalling cabinets to adapt and standardize interface connections between the field instruments and the Triconex system cabinets.
- Human machine interface (HMI) to monitor the events.
- Engineering workstation (EWS) for programming. monitoring, troubleshooting, and updating.

=== Software ===
The Triconex main processors can communicate with the so-called TriStation 1131 application software to download, update and/or monitor programs. These programs are either written in:

- Function Block Diagram language,
- Ladder diagram language, or
- Structured text (Pascal like) Language.
- Cause and Effect Matrix Programmable Language (CEMPLE).

(Function Block Diagram, Ladder diagram and Structured Text are defined in IEC1131-3)

Besides, a Sequence of Events (SOE) recorder software and Diagnostic monitor software are implemented.

=== Triton malware ===
In December 2017, it was reported that the safety systems of an unidentified power station, believed to be in Saudi Arabia were compromised when the Triconex industrial safety technology made by Schneider Electric SE was targeted in what is believed to have been a state sponsored attack. The computer security company Symantec claimed that the malware, known as "Triton", exploited a vulnerability in computers running the Microsoft Windows operating system.
