= APV plc =

APV
- Formerly: Aluminium Plant & Vessel Company
- Company type: Public company (1960s-1990s), Subsidiary from 1997
- Industry: Engineering
- Founded: 1910; 116 years ago in Wandsworth, London
- Defunct: 2007
- Fate: Acquired
- Successor: SPX Flow
- Headquarters: Crawley, United Kingdom
- Area served: United Kingdom
- Products: Food processing equipment
- Number of employees: 1,600 (1980s at peak)
- Parent: SPX Corporation

APV was a British company that manufactured industrial food processing and handling machinery.

The company was founded in 1910 and grew to be a major British manufacturer of commercial pumps, valves, heat exchangers, homogenizers, and mixing equipment for the food processing industry.

It was listed on the London Stock Exchange between the 1960s and 1990s until it was acquired by Siebe plc in 1997. The company was later renamed as APV International and split into two components with one sold off. In 2007 the company was acquired by SPX Corporation who continued the name as a brand for some of its products.

== History ==
It was founded in 1910 as the Aluminium Plant & Vessel Company Limited, fabricating equipment for breweries and vegetable oil in Wandsworth.

In 1923, Dr Richard Seligman working for the company invented the plate heat exchanger, revolutionising the methods for the indirect heating and cooling of fluids.

In the 1950s it moved to Crawley and expanded considerably, under the name A.P.V. Co. Ltd. In 1967 it acquired Kestner Evaporator and Engineering Co, another major process plant manufacturer.

Continuing expansion led to a works of 1,600 employees under the name APV International, supplying equipment services to the dairy, food and chemical industries by 1984. In addition a foundry employing 350 people named APV Paramount made high alloy steels and Vent-Axia a subsidiary company making fans, were near by.

In 1987 it merged with Baker Perkins to become APV Baker, later shortened to APV. The two manufacturing arms remained physically separate and the APV section was acquired by Siebe plc in 1997. After the merger of Siebe with BTR plc, APV was acquired by SPX Corporation in 2007 where it remains as a brand name for pumps, valves, heat exchangers, mixers and homogenizers in the process industries.

In 2026, SPXFLOW, along with the APV brand, was acquired by ITT Inc and incorporated into their newly created Flow Technology segment.
