= Henry Fleuss =

British inventor of diving equipment (1851 – 1933)

Henry Albert Fleuss
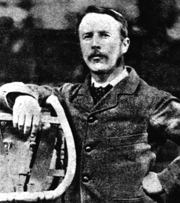
- Born: June 13, 1851
- Died: January 6, 1933 (aged 81)
- Occupations: Engineer; diver

Henry Albert Fleuss (13 June 1851 – 6 January 1933) was a pioneering diving engineer, and Master Diver for Siebe, Gorman & Co. of London.

Fleuss was born in Marlborough, Wiltshire in 1851.

In 1878 he was granted a patent which improved rebreathers. His apparatus consisted of a rubber mask connected to a breathing bag, with (estimated) 50-60% O_{2} supplied from a copper tank and CO_{2} scrubbed by rope yarn soaked in a solution of caustic potash, the system giving a duration of about three hours. Fleuss tested his device in 1879 by spending an hour submerged in a water tank, then one week later by diving to a depth of 5.5m in open water, upon which occasion he was slightly injured when his assistants abruptly pulled him to the surface.

Fleuss's apparatus was first used under operational conditions in November 1880 by Alexander Lambert, lead diver of the Severn Tunnel construction project. Trained by Fleuss, he was able to close a submerged sluice door in the tunnel which had defeated the best efforts of hard hat divers due to the danger of their air supply hoses becoming fouled on submerged debris, and the strong water currents in the workings.

The same apparatus was later used several times to rescue mine workers in flooded workings.

Some time before the First World War, the Fleuss-Davis independent breathing set for hardhat divers appeared. This device consisted of two 10-cubic-foot (280 L) tanks, one each for compressed air and oxygen. The gases were mixed in a manifold between the two tanks and the diver's mouthpiece. The manufacturer claimed success of this unit to depths of 66 feet.

Fleuss also invented the Fleuss vacuum pump, which was a double action Guericke type pump which delivers an almost constant suction. It uses a cylinder divided in halves: as one half of the cylinder is filled with air, the other half is evacuating air to the atmosphere by one stroke of the pump. The next stroke reverses this action, producing the constant flow.

He died 6 January 1933 at Thorndon Cross, Okehampton, aged 81.
