= Siebe plc =

British engineering corporation

- Company type: Public company
- Industry: Engineering
- Founded: 1 April 1920
- Defunct: 1999
- Fate: Merged with BTR plc
- Successor: Invensys
- Headquarters: London, UK
- Key people: Sir Barrie Stephens, (chairman)

Siebe plc became the name of the new conglomerate formed when Siebe Gorman began taking over other firms in the early 1970s, to distinguish it from Siebe Gorman's original breathing apparatus and diving gear core business. Siebe plc was once one of the United Kingdom's largest engineering businesses and was a constituent of the FTSE 100 Index. In 1999 it merged with BTR plc to form Invensys.

== History ==
- About 1972: Siebe plc became the name of the new conglomerate formed when Siebe Gorman began taking over other firms, to distinguish it from Siebe Gorman's original breathing apparatus and diving gear core business.
- 1972: Siebe plc acquired James North & Sons, a large safety products business, and continued to brand it as North Safety Products.
- 1985: Siebe plc acquires CompAir, a business making compressed air equipment for the mining and construction industries, divers and firefighters.
- 1987: Siebe plc acquires the Barber-Colman Company, an industrial automation and controls business.
- 1990: Siebe plc acquires the Foxboro Company, another industrial automation business.
- 1994: Siebe plc bought Triconex, a safety control business.
- 1997: Siebe plc acquired APV plc.
- 1998: Siebe plc acquired Eurotherm, Wonderware and Simulation Sciences.
- 1998: Siebe plc sold North Safety Products (and Siebe Gorman with it) to Norcross.
- 1999: Siebe plc acquired Esscor.
- 1999: Siebe plc merged with BTR plc to form Invensys.
