= Invensys =

British engineering corporation (1999–2014)

Invensys Limited
- Type: Subsidiary
- Industry: Industrial Automation, Transportation, Controls
- Predecessor: BTR; Siebe
- Founded: 1999; 27 years ago
- Defunct: 2014
- Fate: Acquired by Schneider Electric
- Headquarters: London, England
- Key people: Jean-Pascal Tricoire (chairman and CEO)
- Revenue: £1,792 million (2013)
- Operating income: £43 million (2013)
- Net income: £128 million (2013)
- Number of employees: 16,500 (2011)

Invensys Limited was a multinational engineering and information technology company headquartered in London, United Kingdom. At its height, the company had offices in more than 50 countries and its products were sold in around 180 countries.

Invensys was formed in 1999 through the merger of BTR plc and Siebe plc. It was originally founded on 1 April 1920 as Siebe Gorman & Company Ltd and continued through various name changes registered at Companies House from that date. Invensys lines of business were grouped into four segments: Software, Industrial Automation, Energy Controls and Appliance. Its brands included Avantis, Eurotherm, Foxboro, IMServ, InFusion, Triconex, SimSci, Skelta, Wonderware, Drayton, Eberle, and Eliwell.

Less than three years after its establishment, Invensys was in financial hardship, in part due to having overpaid for acquisitions such as the Baan Corporation at the height of the dotcom bubble and having accumulated a heavy debt burden. Through several divestments and a major restructuring, the company's fiscal situation had improved by 2005, allowing the pace of acquisitions to pick up. Considerable business was being obtained by its various products in the railway sector, which it opted to align under the Invensys Rail brand. Invensys Rail was ultimately sold to the German engineering conglomerate Siemens in exchange for £1.7 billion in May 2013.

Between 2011 and early 2012, the company's share price fell by nearly 50%, which was attributed to a £40 million expense from the delayed production of control and safety systems for eight Chinese nuclear reactors. In response, Invensys began openingly seeking to be acquired by a larger company, approaching the American industrial automation company Emerson Electric without any bid being made. During January 2014, Invensys was taken over by the French multinational Schneider Electric for a total consideration of $5.5 billion. Schneider opted to fully integrate the company and phased out the "Invensys" brand in favour of its own.

== History ==
Invensys was formed through the merger of BTR plc and Siebe plc in 1999. Between 1999 and 2004, it underwent a major restructuring programme involving thousands of redundancies to cut its costs amid falling sales and a sizeable debt burden that allegedly posed the possibility of the company going bankrupt. A major disposal programme combined with a £2.7bn debt restructuring during 2004 saved Invensys from collapse. It was under this strategy that The Baan Corporation, which it purchased in 2000 amid the dotcom bubble for €762 million, was sold three years later for only US$135 million. Several other elements, such as Fasco motors and Eurotherm Drives, were also divested to refinance the company.

During May 2005, following the completion of the refinancing effort, Rick Haythornthwaite resigned his position as Invensys' chief executive, his position was filled by Ulf Henriksson. In May 2006, the French multinational Schneider Electric announced that it would acquire Invensys Building Systems (IBS) operations in both North America and Asia in exchange for $296 million. During December 2007, Invensys arranged to sell its Firex Safety Division to United Technologies. That year, the company opted to expand its presence in Indonesia.

In late 2009, as part of an effort to align its various brands and names in the railway sector together, Westinghouse Rail Systems was renamed Invensys Rail. At the time, Invensys Rail was one of a handful of companies that produced equipment compatible with the new European Rail Traffic Management System (ERTMS). During 2011 alone, deals cumulatively valued at £700 million were secured by Invensys Rail from numerous organisations such as Network Rail and Obrascón Huarte Lain for its signalling products.

In March 2011, Wayne Edmunds, who had been Invensys' chief financial officer since 2009, was appointed Chief Executive, replacing Ulf Henriksson. According to The Financial Times, Henriksson, who had been Invensys's Chief Executive since 2005, had had differences with chairman Nigel Rudd over the company's management, in spite of the return to financial health under Henriksson.

During the late 2000s and early 2010s, Invensys became increasingly involved in the Chinese market across various sectors, including the rail and power generation sectors. Between 2011 and early 2012, the company's share price dropped by almost 50%, the devaluation being largely attributed to a £40 million expense associated with delays in the production of control and safety systems for eight Chinese nuclear reactors. On 2 May 2013, Invensys sold off its Wiltshire-based rail division to the German engineering conglomerate Siemens in exchange for £1.7 billion, the majority of which being used to address a deficit in its company pension scheme.

In 2012, Invensys held discussions with the American industrial automation company Emerson Electric on a prospective takeover, although Emerson never issued any firm approach. That same year, the company's management team was compelled to issue a denial of a comment made by Henriksson that he expected China Southern Rail to make a substantial offer to obtain a stake in Invensys. The two companies had previously signed licensing agreements that led to Invensys Rail Group's signalling products being locally produced in China as well as to jointly sell those products to China's expansive mass transit market.

During July 2013, it was announced that Invensys was set to be taken over by Schneider Electric, one of the firm's long term competitors, for a total consideration of £3.4 billion. The deal was noted to likely involve job losses as Schneider revealed plans to make cost savings of around €140m (£122m) per year. Reports claimed that the American engineering conglomerate General Electric was planning to issue its own £3.5 billion ($5.3 billion) counterbid for control of Invensys. The takeover was completed on 17 January 2014 and Invensys was declared to have been fully integrated by Schneider seven months later.

== Operations ==
Invensys was organised into four main segments: Software, Industrial Automation, Energy Controls and Appliance.

=== Avantis ===
Avantis Enterprise Asset Management provides maintenance repair and operations including maintenance management, spares and inventory management, condition monitoring and procurement.

=== Eurotherm ===
Eurotherm is a supplier of control measurement and data recording to industrial and process consumers.

=== Foxboro ===
Foxboro Company provides control systems addressing distributed and plant operations as well as measurement and instrument systems. Instruments include Pressure Transmitters, Coriolis Flow Meters, Valve Positioners, Buoyancy Level Transmitters and Temperature Transmitters.

=== IMServ Europe ===
IMServ Europe is a provider of energy management and data monitoring services. IMServ was previously part of Invensys Controls.

=== SimSci ===
SimSci provides applications that help improve asset performance and utilisation with integrated simulation, optimisation, training, and process control software and services.

=== Skelta BPM ===
Skelta BPM is a product for business process management.

=== Triconex ===
Triconex provides safety and critical control systems used in applications including emergency shutdown, burner management, fire and gas and turbomachinery control and protection.

=== Wonderware ===
Wonderware provides software products to address production operations, production performance, manufacturing intelligence, business process management and collaboration.

== See also ==
- List of companies based in London
