= Wonderware =

Industrial software

- Industry: Software
- Founder: Dennis Morin, Phil Huber
- Products: InTouch, Historian, System Platform, Development Studio, Manufacturing Execution System
- Owner: Aveva

Wonderware was a brand of industrial software now owned by Aveva and rebranded under the AVEVA name. Wonderware was part of Invensys plc, and Invensys plc was acquired in January 2014 by Schneider Electric. Invensys plc. was formed in 1999 by the merger of BTR plc and Siebe plc, and Wonderware was acquired by Siebe plc in 1998.

The Wonderware software now under the AVEVA name is used in various industries, including: Automotive Assembly, Facilities Management, Food and Beverage, CPG, Mining and Metals, Power, Oil and Gas, Chemicals, Energy, Water and Wastewater.

== Distribution ==
Over the decades Wonderware built up a network of distributing partners including a group of individually owned partners doing business under the Wonderware name. This network, including those Wonderware named partners, now sell and support AVEVA products. The Wonderware brand and name now only exists as a distribution name for AVEVA.

== History ==
Wonderware was co-founded by Dennis Morin and Phil Huber. Both were former employees of another local startup located in Irvine, California.

Wonderware was sold to British-based SIEBE in 1998 for nearly 400 million dollars. By that time, all the founding members had left the company. Co-Founder Phil Huber remains active in startups. Morin died on the last day of 2012. Wonderware became part of Paris-based Schneider-Electric in 2014.

Wonderware was formed as a partnership in 1987 and incorporated in California in 1988 as Wonderware Software Development Corporation. The company reincorporated in Delaware in 1993. At the time, there were other software companies making programs to automate production processes, but Wonderware was the first to introduce a program designed to be used with the Microsoft Windows operating system.

== Mergers and acquisitions ==
The original Wonderware Corporation was acquired by Siebe plc in 1998. In 1999, Siebe plc merged with BTR plc to form Invensys plc; in January 2014, Schneider Electric acquired Invensys plc; then in March 2018, AVEVA merged with Schneider Electric Software.
