= Westinghouse Rail Systems =

Former British company

Westinghouse Rail Systems Ltd
- Formerly: Westinghouse Signals
- Company type: Subsidiary
- Industry: Transport
- Founded: 1900
- Defunct: 2013
- Fate: Acquired by Siemens
- Successor: Siemens Mobility
- Headquarters: Chippenham, England
- Products: Railway signalling
- Owner: Invensys

Westinghouse Rail Systems Ltd (formerly Westinghouse Signals Ltd) was a British supplier of railway signalling and control equipment to the rail industry worldwide. Its head office was in Chippenham, Wiltshire, where it manufactured a variety of mechanical and electrical/electronic railway signalling equipment. It had six other UK offices in Croydon, York, Birmingham, Crawley, Swanley and Glasgow. It also had a number of overseas offices, particularly in the Far East, including Melbourne.

Westinghouse was the largest signalling design and control engineering company within the UK. Its largest contract was awarded in 2004: a ten-year £850m re-signalling of eight London Underground lines for the Metronet Public-Private Partnership.

The company was owned by Invensys plc before being sold to Siemens in 2013. It is now part of Siemens Mobility, the Westinghouse name having been dropped.

== History ==
Westinghouse Rail Systems' origin is in the signals division of Westinghouse Brake and Signal Company, which was founded as Westinghouse Brake & Saxby Signal Company in 1920. Hawker Siddeley purchased that company in 1979 and sold it to BTR plc in 1992. In 1999, BTR merged with Siebe to form Invensys.

Invensys split the business into two companies, Westinghouse Signals and Westinghouse Brakes, then sold Westinghouse Brakes to Knorr-Bremse in April 2000. Westinghouse Signals (invensys) is now part of Siemens Mobility.

== Products ==
Westinghouse produces a variety of signalling and railway control equipment, including:

- Style 63 point machine
- Solid State Interlocking
- Westlock Interlocking
- WESTRACE
- WESTEX
- WESTCAD
