= Looser =

Looser is the surname of the following notable people:

- Devoney Looser (born 1967), American literary critic
- Gualterio Looser (1898–1982), Chilean botanist and engineer
- Hubert Looser (born 1938), Swiss businessman, philanthropist and art collector
- Vera Looser (born 1993), Namibian road cyclist and mountain biker

== See also ==
- Loser (disambiguation)
- Loose (disambiguation)
- Loss (disambiguation)
