= Looze =

Looze may refer to:

- Looze, Yonne, France

== People ==
- Bram De Looze (born 1991), Belgian jazz pianist
- Dennis Looze (born 1972), Dutch athlete
- Pieter de Looze (1811–1881), Dutch publisher
- Ray Looze, American swimming coach
- Tracy Looze (born 1973), Dutch athlete

== See also ==
- Lose (disambiguation)
- Loose (disambiguation)
