= Loose =

Loose may refer to:

== Places ==
- Loose, Germany
- Loose, Kent, a parish and village in southeast England

== People ==
- Loose (surname)

== Arts, entertainment, and media ==
=== Music ===
==== Albums ====
- Loose (B'z album), 1995
- Loose (Crazy Horse album), 1972
- Loose (Nelly Furtado album), 2006
  - Loose Mini DVD, a 2007 DVD by Nelly Furtado
  - Loose: The Concert, a 2007 live DVD by Nelly Furtado
  - Get Loose Tour, a concert tour by Nelly Furtado
- Loose (Victoria Williams album), 1994
- Loose..., by Willis Jackson, 1963
- Loose, mixtape by Jack Harlow, 2018

==== Songs ====
- "Loose" (S1mba song), 2020
- "Loose" (Therapy? song), 1995
- "Loose", by Daniel Caesar from Freudian, 2017
- "Loose", by Enhypen from Desire: Unleash, 2025
- "Loose", by Primer 55 from Introduction to Mayhem, 1999
- "Loose", by the Stooges from Fun House, 1970
- "Loose!", by Prince from Come, 1994

== Slang ==
- Loose, slang for inebriated or high on drugs, as in "get loose"
- Loose, slang antonym for anxious ("uptight"), as in "loosen up"
- Loose woman, a promiscuous female
  - Loose morals, especially sexual morals, not much concerned with prevailing ethics
- Loose steering, vehicle oversteering
- "Loose lips sink ships", an American English idiom meaning "beware of unguarded talk"

== Computing and technology ==
- Loose (framework), a meta object system for Lua, based on Perl's Moose
- Loose coupling, in computing and systems design
  - See also, Loose coupling (disambiguation)

== See also ==
- Bustin' Loose (disambiguation)
- Lose (disambiguation)
- Loss (disambiguation)
- Luce (disambiguation)
