= Promiscuous (disambiguation) =

Promiscuous may refer to behavior that is indiscriminate. In a social context it usually refers to sexual behavior but it may also be used for any indiscriminate action:

- "Promiscuous" (song), a 2006 song by Nelly Furtado featuring Timbaland (also known as both "Promiscuous Girl" and/or "Promiscuous Boy")
- Enzyme promiscuity, the catalysis of more than one reaction by an enzyme
- Promiscuity, promiscuous sexual behaviour
- Promiscuous mode, a network interface controller mode that eavesdrops on messages intended for others

== See also ==
- Loose (disambiguation)
