= Losing =

Losing may refer to:

== Music ==
- Losing (album)
- "Losing" (Tenth Avenue North song), a 2012 song by Tenth Avenue North
- "Losing" (Takida song), a 2006 song by Takida

== People ==
- Sabine Lösing (born 1955), German politician
- Losing Watan (樂信·瓦旦), Atayal opinion leader; see Uyongʉ Yata'uyungana

== See also ==
- Losing It (disambiguation)
- Losing You (disambiguation)
- Lose (disambiguation)
- Loss (disambiguation)
