= Losin =

Losin may refer to:

- Ko Losin (Losin Island), small rocky islet in Pattani, Thailand
- "Losin'", song by Yuna Ito

== See also ==
- Losing (disambiguation)
- All Wikipedia pages beginning with Losin
