= Lose It =

Lose It can refer to:

- "Lose It", song by Supergrass from the album I Should Coco
- "Lose It", song by Flume from Skin (Flume album)
- "Lose It", song by Quavo from the album Quavo Huncho
- "Lose It", song by Austra from the album Feel It Break
- "Lose It (In the End)", song by Mark Ronson from Record Collection (album)
- "Lose It" (Kane Brown song)
- "Lose It" (Cartel song)
- "Lose It", song by Paolo Nutini from the album Last Night in the Bittersweet

== See also ==
- Lose (disambiguation)
- Losing It (disambiguation)
- Love It (disambiguation)
