= The Losers =

The Losers may refer to:

- The Losers (comics), a war comic book feature published by DC Comics starting in 1970
- The Losers (Vertigo), a comic published by DC Comics' Vertigo imprint, inspired by the original comic series
- The Losers (2010 film), an action film based on the Vertigo comic
- The Losers (1970 film), an American biker war film
- The Losers (TV series), an ITV sitcom from 1978 starring Leonard Rossiter
- The Losers (Howard Stern), a band made up of The Howard Stern Show cast members
- The Losers, a novel written by David Eddings and published in 1992

== See also ==
- The Loser (novel), a novel by Thomas Bernhard and originally published in German in 1983
- Loser (disambiguation)
