= Just Because (The Belle Brigade album) =

2014 studio album by the Belle Brigade

Studio album by The Belle Brigade
- Released: March 25, 2014
- Length: 35:44
- Label: ATO

The Belle Brigade chronology
The Belle Brigade (2011)	Just Because (2014)

Just Because is the second full-length album by American band The Belle Brigade, whose members are siblings Bobby and Ethan Gruska. It was recorded with engineer and co-producer Shawn Everett and mastered by Bob Ludwig. The album was released on March 25, 2014.

The Belle Brigade's first album had received wide critical praise, but on their second album, the Gruskas wanted to pursue a less slickly produced and more individual sound. Their record company, Reprise Records, expressed dissatisfaction with the results, and ultimately the band took the record to independent ATO Records.

== Reception ==
Professional ratings
Aggregate scores
Source	Rating
Metacritic	78/100
Review scores
Source	Rating
AllMusic	4/5 stars
Filter	79%
Paste	7.5/10
PopMatters	7/10

Critical reception has been mainly positive. Time praised the first single, "How I See It", as an "easygoing, exuberant song" that made a "perfect introduction to a California-dreaming band on the brink of making it big." In a four-star review, AllMusic said the album "doesn't break down any walls" but was a timeless-sounding collection of songs with contemporary tools" and "finesse". PopMatters rated the record 7/10, noting its "slightly darker indie edge" and finding the release to be "a clear step forward". Paste similarly noted the album's greater use of "modern synths and samples" but found it "just a little surprising that such a sad record can sound so blissfully blasé."

== Track listing ==
No.	Title	Length
1.	"Ashes"	3:45
2.	"When Everything Was What It Was"	3:32
3.	"Likely to Use Something"	4:09
4.	"Be Like Him"	2:46
5.	"Miss You in My Life"	3:56
6.	"How I See It"	3:15
7.	"Not the One"	3:09
8.	"Metropolis"	3:16
9.	"Everything for a Stone"	3:29
10.	"Back Where You Began"	4:27

== Charts ==
Chart (2014)	Peak position
US Heatseekers Albums (Billboard)	34

== Release history ==
Region	Date
United States	March 25, 2014
