= Faulty Superheroes =

Studio album by Robert Pollard
- Released: May 26, 2015
- Label: Guided by Voices Inc. (US); Fire (UK)
- Producer: Todd Tobias

Robert Pollard chronology
Blazing Gentlemen (2013)	Faulty Superheroes (2015)	Of Course You Are (2016)

Professional ratings
Aggregate scores
Source	Rating
Metacritic	77/100
Review scores
Source	Rating
AllMusic	3.5/5 stars

Faulty Superheroes is the 21st studio album by singer-songwriter Robert Pollard. It was released May 26, 2015, on Guided by Voices Inc.

== Track listing ==
1. "What a Man"
2. "Cafe of Elimination"
3. "Faulty Superheroes"
4. "Faster the Great"
5. "The Real Wilderness"
6. "Photo-Enforced Human Highway"
7. "Take Me to Yolita"
8. "Up Up and Up"
9. "You Only Need One"
10. "Bizarro's Last Quest"
11. "Mozart's Throne"
12. "Parakeet Vista"
