= The Belle Brigade =

American musical duo

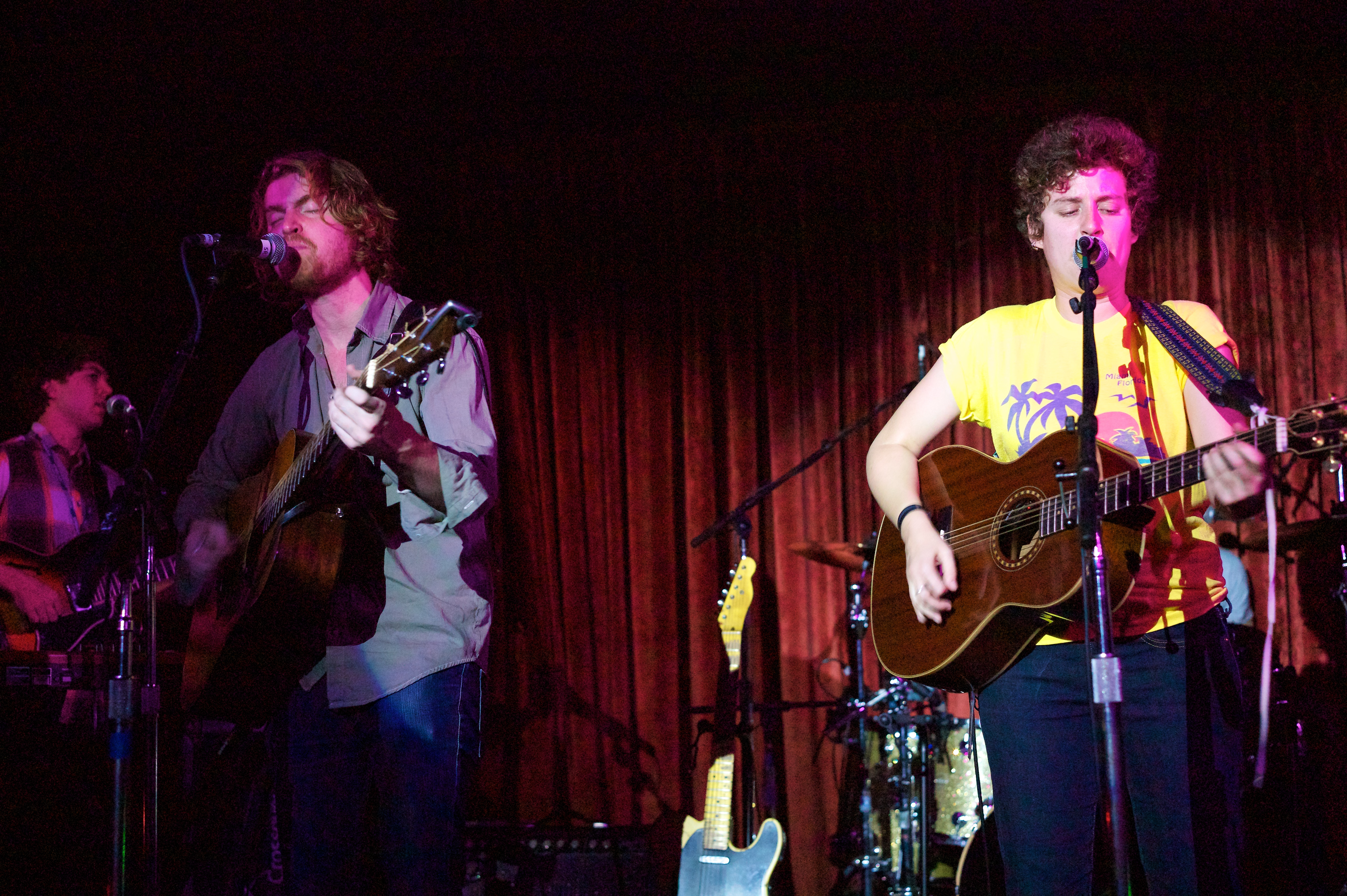
- The Belle Brigade in 2012

Background information
- Origin: Los Angeles, California, US
- Genre: Folk rock
- Years active: 2008–2016
- Labels: Reprise; ATO
- Past members: Bobby Gruska; Ethan Gruska

The Belle Brigade was an American vocal and instrumental duo from Los Angeles, California, consisting of siblings Bobby Gruska (born c. 1983) (formerly Barbara) on guitar, drums, and vocals, and Ethan Gruska (born c. 1989) on guitar, piano, and vocals. The duo released its first album, The Belle Brigade, in 2011.

== Biography ==
The Gruskas come from a musical family. Their father, Jay Gruska, is a movie and television composer, and their grandfather is multiple-Oscar-winning composer John Williams. Their great-grandfather was Raymond Scott Quintet drummer Johnny Williams, and other relatives also worked as professional drummers. Bobby Gruska studied jazz drumming at Oberlin College and CalArts and drummed for performers such as Fiona Apple, Chrissie Hynde, Ray Lamontagne, K.D. Lang, Neko Case, Jenny Lewis, Benji Hughes and Inara George. Ethan also studied at CalArts. While giving birth to Ethan, their mother, Jenny Williams Gruska, suffered a stroke; she recovered, and her story became the basis for a 1994 NBC television film titled A Time to Heal (for which their father wrote the music) and later for their song "Lucky Guy".

Bobby and Ethan began a band together in 2008. Their first album, The Belle Brigade, was co-produced by Bobby, Ethan and Matthew Wilder and released on Reprise Records in April 2011. The duo has toured with such acts as Grace Potter and the Nocturnals, G. Love & Special Sauce, k.d. lang, Dawes, and Blitzen Trapper.

They also feature a song on the Twilight Saga Breaking Dawn Part 1 soundtrack, "I Didn't Mean It", and performed Bob Dylan's "No Time to Think" on the Amnesty International benefit album Chimes of Freedom.

The band's second full-length album, Just Because, was released in March 2014. The Gruskas wanted to pursue a more individual sound on the follow-up, and after the record company expressed its dissatisfaction, the band took the record to independent ATO Records.

Starting in May 2014, Belle Brigade toured as the opening act and part of the backup band for Ray LaMontagne's North American tour.

== Critical response ==
The Belle Brigade's music, marked by harmonies reminiscent of The Everly Brothers and Simon & Garfunkel, has been described as having roots in the classic California pop rock and country sounds of groups like Fleetwood Mac and The Flying Burrito Brothers as well as The Beatles. Ethan Gruska has said that their strongest influence is Paul Simon's solo work.

Their debut album has received critical attention and praise. Los Angeles Times music writer Randall Roberts described their album as "a dozen California pop gems" and said of their first single, "Losers": "A defiant, classically structured song about being sick of social games, pretense and irony, "Losers" feels like one of those works of alienation that's existed forever, one that would ring true just as clearly had it been released in 1957 or 1974." L.A. Times record reviewer Mikael Wood called the album "the sound of a record nerd’s dream come to messy, muscular life." Newsday critic Glenn Gamboa referred to their "doe-eyed innocence . . . that makes their sun-kissed '70s SoCal sound even more appealing." Paste reviewer Alexandra Fletcher listed their song "Where Not to Look for Freedom" as one of her "10 New Songs For The 2011 Summer". And El Paso Times reviewer Doug Pullen called the album "charming, compelling, timeless and inspiring—and worthy of repeated listening" and said it was his "favorite album this year."

== Discography ==
Albums

- The Belle Brigade (2011)
- Just Because (2014)

Compilation appearances

- Chimes of Freedom: The Songs of Bob Dylan (2012): cover of Bob Dylan's "No Time to Think" from Street-Legal.
