= Full-face diving mask =

Diving mask that covers the mouth as well as the eyes and nose

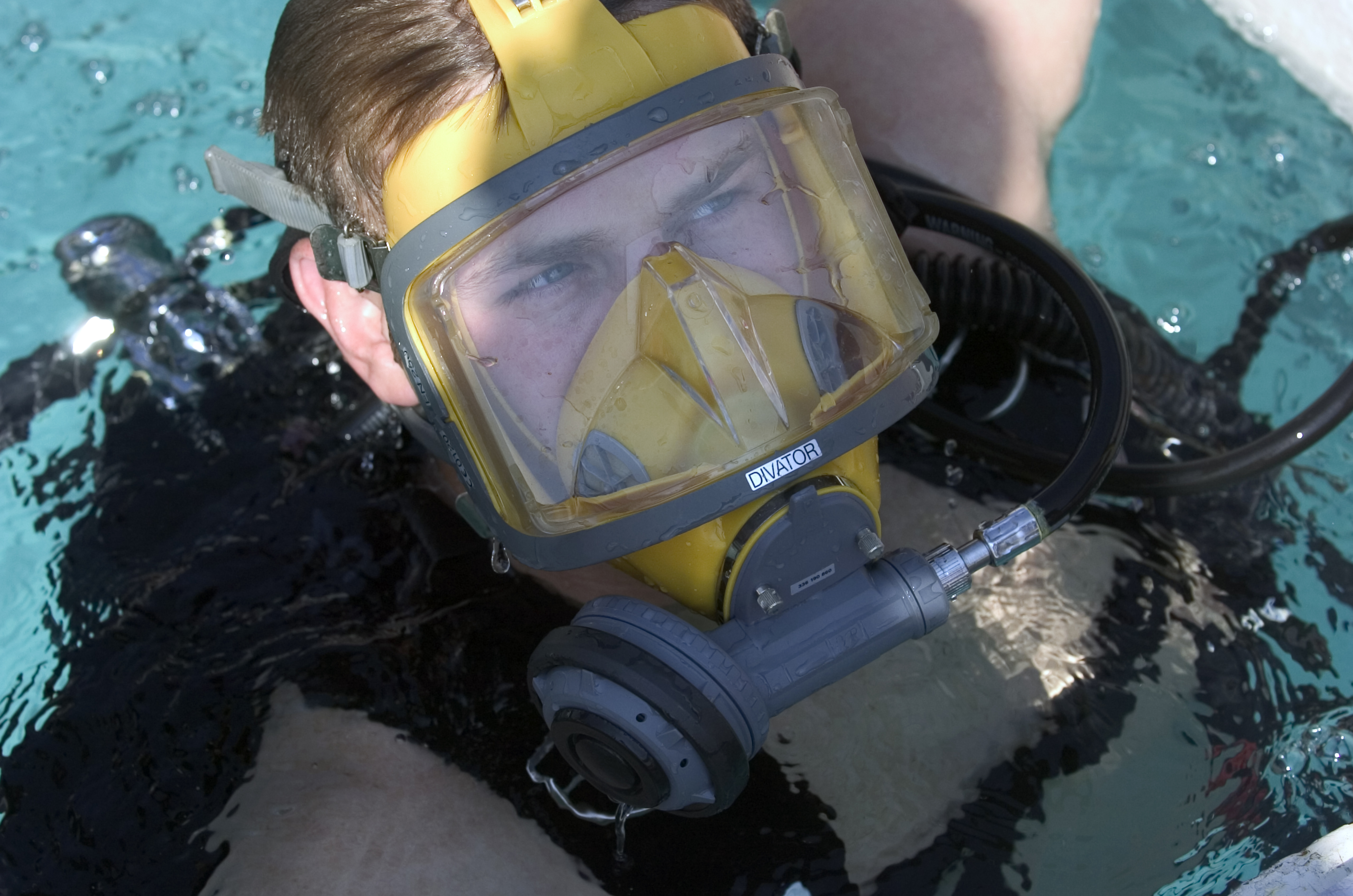
- The AGA Divator full-face diving mask is used by military and civilian divers
- Other names: Full face diving mask Full face mask Band-mask
- Uses: Provision of breathing gas, underwater vision, and sometimes communications for underwater divers
- Inventor: Yves le Prieur
- Related items: Diving helmet, Diving regulator, Diver communications, Diving mask

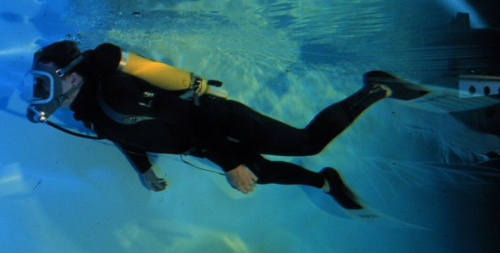
A diver in a pool wearing an AGA full face mask

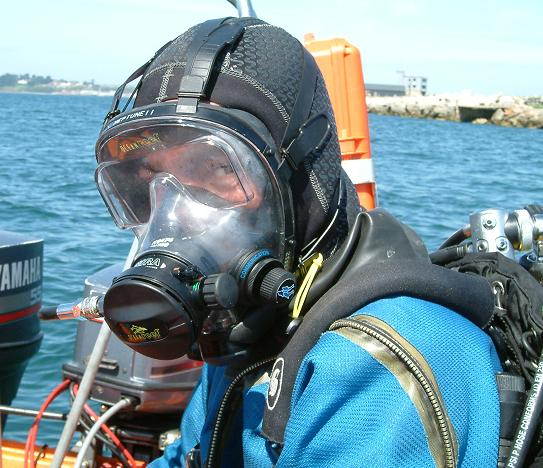
A diver wearing an Ocean Reef full face mask

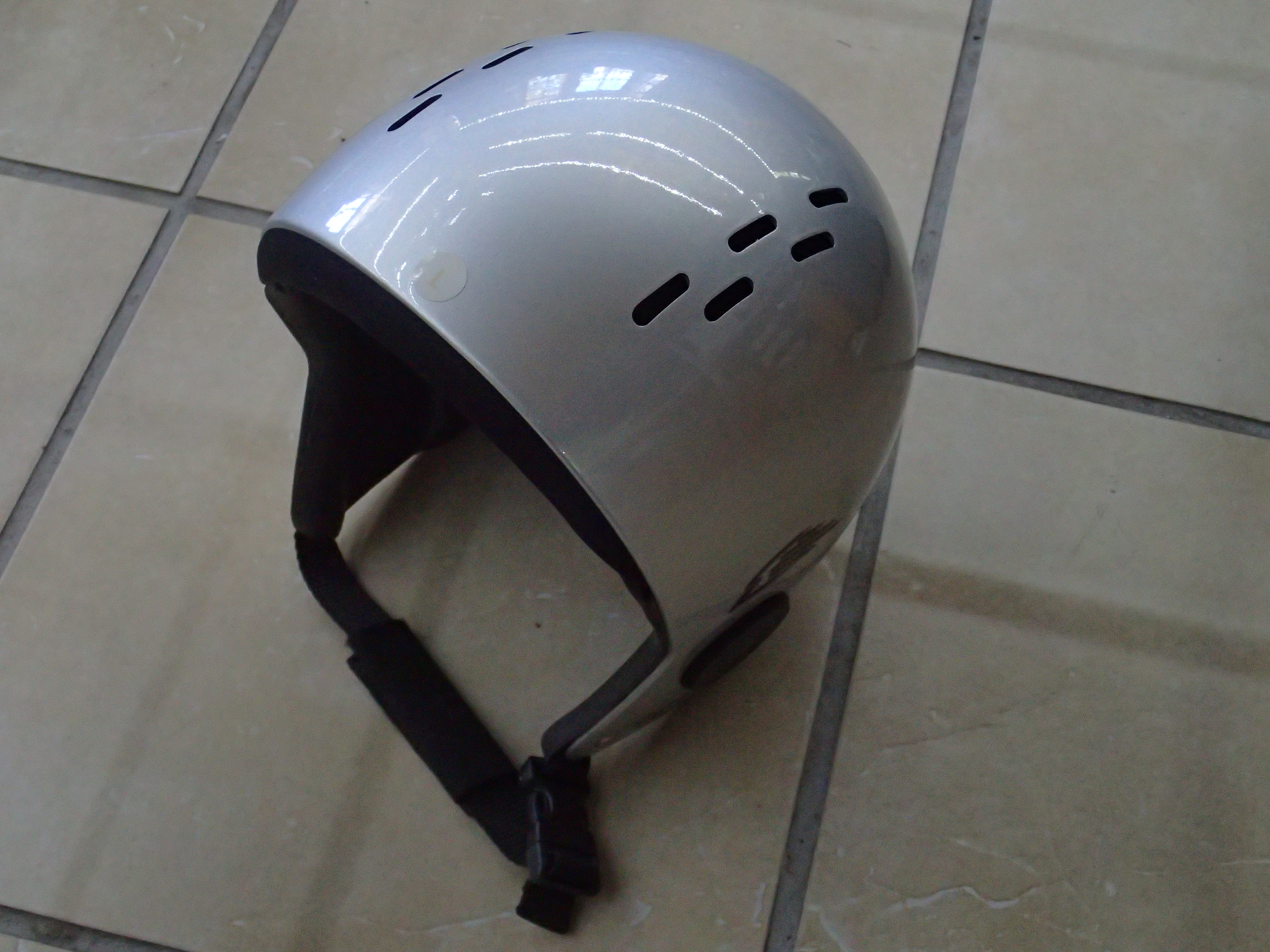
Head protection helmet for use with Ocean Reef full face diving mask

A full-face diving mask is a type of diving mask that seals the whole of the diver's face from the water and contains a mouthpiece, demand valve or constant flow gas supply that provides the diver with breathing gas. The full face mask has several functions: it lets the diver see clearly underwater, it provides the diver's face with some protection from cold and polluted water and from stings, such as from jellyfish or coral. It increases breathing security and provides a space for equipment that lets the diver communicate with the surface support team.

Full-face masks can be more secure than breathing from an independent mouthpiece; if the diver becomes unconscious or suffers an oxygen toxicity convulsion, the diver can continue to breathe from the mask, unlike a scuba mouthpiece which is normally gripped between the teeth.

Full-face diving masks are often used in professional diving. They are relatively rarely used in recreational diving.

== Function ==
The full-face mask provides breathing gas to the diver, and an air space to facilitate underwater vision. There is usually one air space for both breathing and vision, and this is automatically equalised by the breathing gas during descent. However, some models have a mouthpiece isolating the breathing gas supply from the rest of the interior of the mask, or have a divided interior, and the main air space must then be equalised during descent by exhaling through the nose.

Most full-face masks have an open circuit demand gas supply, but free-flow and closed circuit applications also exist and models used in commercial diving may be normally demand supplied, but with a free-flow option selectable by the diver.

=== Positive pressure ===
For some applications it is desirable for the gas inside the mask or helmet to remain at a pressure slightly above ambient at all times while in the water, as this will prevent any contamination from leaking into the gas space during inhalation if the face or neck seal, or the exhaust valve system, does not seal perfectly. In clean water such a leak is a minor problem, but leaks of contaminated water can be a hazard to health, and even life-threatening. A positive pressure inside a free-flow helmet is easily achieved by slightly increasing the opening pressure of the exhaust valve, provided it is adjustable, but for a demand system the cracking pressure of the demand valve must also be adjusted, so that it delivers gas before the internal pressure drops below external ambient pressure. This is not difficult, as a slight adjustment to second stage valve spring pressure is all that is required. The problem is that when the mask or helmet is off the diver, and the gas supply is pressurised, the demand valve will leak continuously, and a large amount of gas can be lost. The Interspiro Divator Mk II mask has a second stage regulator which has a manual lock on the demand valve to prevent free-flow when the mask is not in use, which unlocks when a breath is taken, and must be reset when the mask is taken off.

== Construction ==
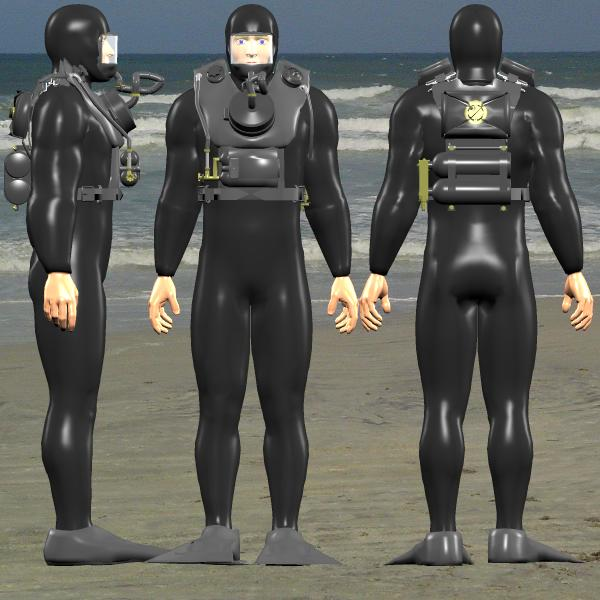
The older Royal Navy Clearance Diver's and British SBS frogman's Admiralty Pattern full-face mask with a big front window and a mouthpiece inside made by Siebe Gorman

A full-face mask consists of a transparent faceplate (lenses, or window) through which the diver can see, a connection to a source of breathing gas, a means of removing any water which may get inside, some facility for the diver to block the nose to equalise the ears, a means of sealing these components to the diver's face and preventing ingress of water and a means of securing the assembly to the diver's head. Additional components may include communications equipment, lights, alternative breathing gas connections, and a means to defog the interior surface of the faceplate.

Two basic configurations are in common use: Those with a soft elastomer skirt which seals around the periphery of the face, and those with a rigid frame supporting the other components, which is sealed to the face by a soft foam ring which is clamped to the frame by a metal band, to which the straps are secured (band mask)

=== Faceplate or lenses ===
The faceplate, viewport, or lens is a transparent window, usually flat, which encloses an air space in front of the diver's eyes and allows the eyes to focus correctly underwater. Several shapes have been used for faceplates and lenses:

- Circular, as in WWII Italian frogman's rebreathers and in some early British frogman's rebreathers.
- Oval, in some early British frogman's rebreathers.
- Triangular with rounded corners, in some Siebe Gorman fullface masks intended for use with an aqualung set, and in the "Jack Browne" band masks made by DESCO for rebreather, open circuit demand, and free-flow applications.
- Some of DESCO's fullface mask windows were egg-shaped (wider above).
- Rectangular with the ends of the sides bent back for better sideways visibility, as in the Admiralty Pattern full-face mask made by Siebe Gorman and used on the Siebe Gorman CDBA.
- In some older masks, small separate lenses, like some gasmasks.
- Kidney shaped, as in the Cressi full-face mask, or approximately rectangular, with a deep cut-out for the nose pocket, as in the KM-48.

The shape and maximum size of mask and helmet viewports changed with availability of tougher and easily moulded transparent synthetic materials: Clear acrylic (perspex) became available in 1933 and polycarbonate in 1958. Diving helmet windows had been of glass for a long time, but a rigid helmet supported by the corselet resting on the shoulders can carry glass much thicker, stronger, and heavier than a mask strapped over the face and supported by the neck.

=== Frame ===
A structural component is needed to connect all the working parts together and hold the mask in shape. Most full-face masks use a rigid frame for this purpose, which directly or indirectly connects the components together and holds the assembly in shape (Kirby Morgan Exo, Supermask and bandmasks, John Browne mask). The rubber moulding which incorporates the skirt seal may also be sufficiently stiff in places to partially perform this function (Cressi-sub, Scubapro), and the faceplate may also be structural (Dräger Panorama, Ocean Reef Neptune, Aga Divator).

=== Face seal ===
The frame supporting the functional components must be sealed around the face to maintain a leak free internal air space over the eyes, nose, and mouth. Two methods are used.

==== Soft skirt ====
The soft skirted full-face mask is the more common arrangement, and is generally considerably lighter and more compact than the more sturdy and rigid band masks. There is usually a plastic frame which supports the faceplate (or lenses) and a demand valve, but in some cases the lenses and demand valve or rebreather mouthpiece may be attached independently to the rubber mask structure, which is integral with the skirt.

==== Band-masks ====
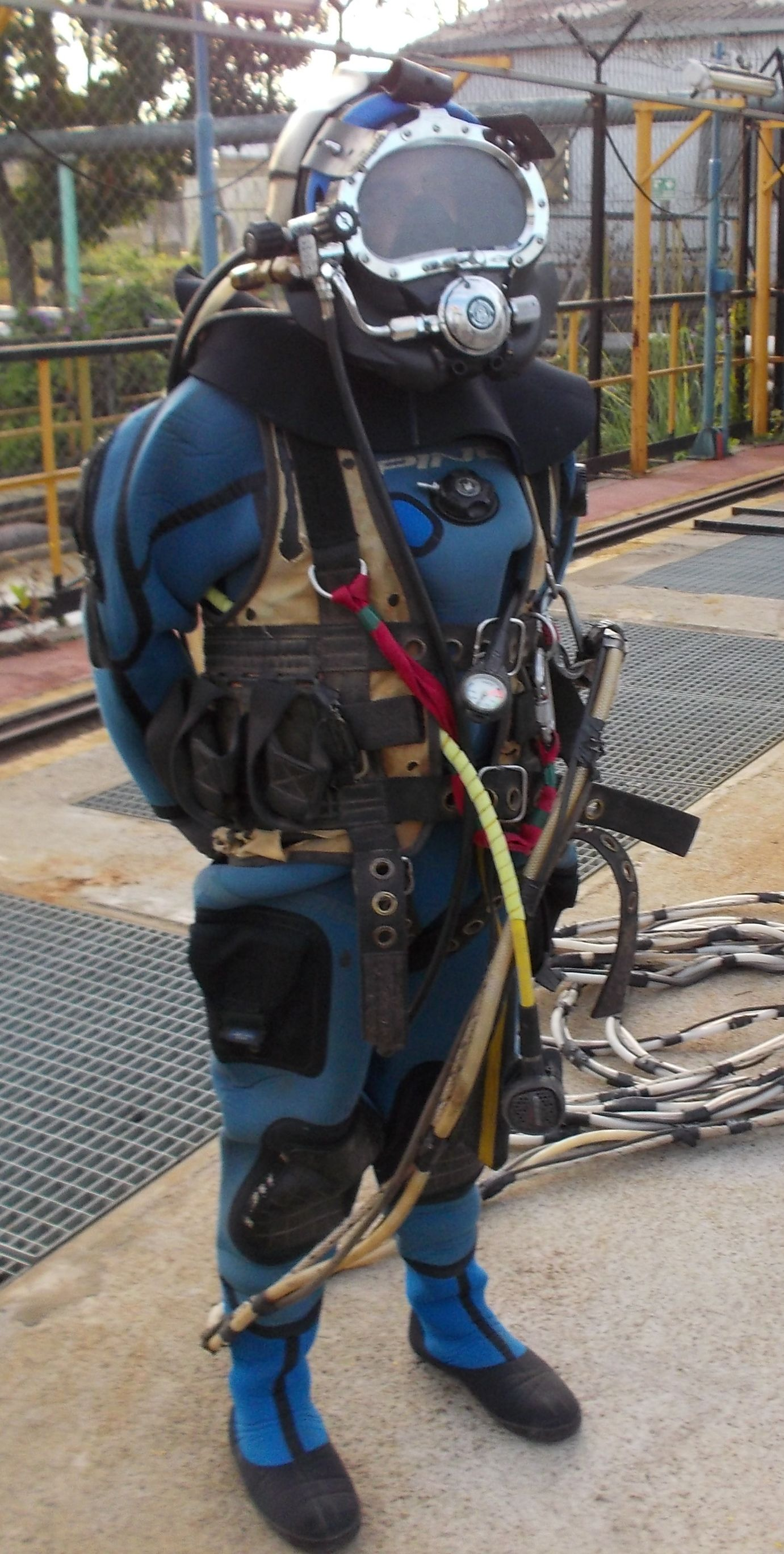
Surface supplied diver wearing a band-mask

A band-mask is a type of full-face diving mask with a rigid and relatively heavy frame, to which a face seal is clamped by a metal band. Band-masks generally have a single faceplate, which may be relatively large, firmly mounted to a rigid frame which also holds the demand valve or other gas supply components. The frame may be of metal (often brass), a strong engineering plastic, or a fibre reinforced resin composite. A face seal, and in some cases a neoprene hood, is clamped onto the edge of the frame by the metal band which gives the mask configuration its name. The band may have several protruding buttons, onto which the straps of the rubber mask harness called the "spider" are fastened to secure the mask to the diver's head. Where a hood is included, it may have a zipper up the back for ease of fitting, and the spider is secured over the hood. A band mask is generally heavier and more cumbersome to fit than a soft skirted full-face mask, but it provides greater security and protection to the diver, and is lighter and quicker to fit than a helmet, though less secure. Most band-masks are fitted with demand systems for gas supply, but can be operated in free-flow mode.

=== Straps ===
A system of three to five straps is used to secure the mask to the diver's head. This component is often referred to as the spider. It is usually a rubber component comprising a group of straps radiating from a central patch or ring, which rests against the back of the diver's head, low enough to resist slipping off over the top. The straps may pass through quick-adjust buckles attached to the mask skirt, or may have holes to hook onto the buttons of a band mask. This strap system is more secure than a single double-ended half-mask strap, however, a full-face mask is far more difficult to replace underwater, if dislodged, than a half-mask.

=== Internal layout ===
Four types of internal layout can be distinguished.

==== Open plan ====
The simplest arrangement is a single interior space, with no subdivisions, and no mouthpiece. This is most appropriate to free flow systems. In this arrangement the diver can talk clearly, including talking with other divers underwater. This allows communications equipment (usually an intercom wire or by modulated ultrasound) to be installed in the mask and is very useful for working divers. If an open plan full-face mask floods underwater, it can be more difficult to clear than with a mouthpiece.

There also is the problem of "dead space" inside some masks causing risk of carbon dioxide retention. Free flow air supply overcomes these problems by providing so much air that the mask is constantly flushed. The cost is high noise level and very inefficient air usage on some models.

==== Internal oro-nasal breathing mask ====
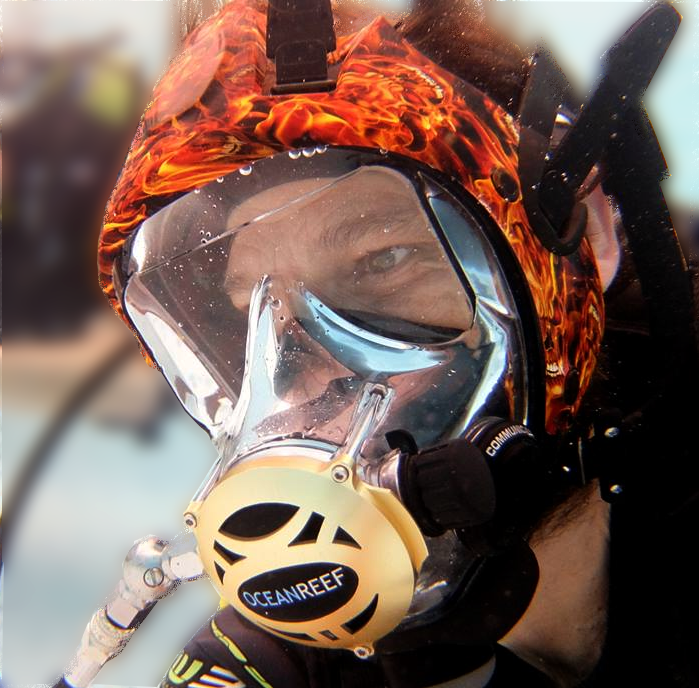
Ocean Reef Full Face Mask (IDM)

With a small (oro-nasal) breathing mask enclosing the mouth and nose inside the full-face mask, the dead space is considerably reduced, but the smaller space around the mouth increases the distortion of speech.

==== Internal mouthpiece ====
A mouthpiece with bite-grip connects the gas supply directly to the diver's mouth inside the mask. If the mask floods, the diver can continue to breathe while clearing the mask, and it minimises dead space. Many Royal Navy and frogman's rebreathers have this mask arrangement. It makes clear talking difficult, but not impossible. For many years British armed forces divers used the Admiralty Pattern full face mask, with a long rectangular window, largely flat, and bent back 90° at the ends, as in the illustration of a diver with a CDBA rebreather. The lower skirt has a hole that a breathing set mouthpiece is fitted through.

==== Mouthpiece on a detachable pod ====
Kirby-Morgan makes a unique configuration of full-face mask, the KM-48 Supermask, which has some characteristics of a half mask, while retaining many of the advantages of the full face mask: The rigid plastic main frame of the mask has a rubber skirt which seals around the eyes and nose like a standard half-mask, the nose may be pinched through the rubber nose pocket to equalise in the same way as with a half mask, and there is an extension to the skirt which seals around the lower part of the face and encloses the mouth. This mask has a clip-on pod section which carries the demand valve, and this part seals against the lower part of the frame, allowing the diver to remove the regulator pod when on the surface, or to use an alternative gas supply, which can either be mounted on another pod, or be an ordinary Scuba regulator second stage with a standard mouthpiece. This feature makes it possible to use bailout gas supplied by a dive buddy with a standard regulator while wearing a Supermask. An optional pod with a dive/surface valve for use with rebreathers is available to military users.

=== Attachment of breathing gas supply components ===
Demand valve, twin hoses, rebreather mouthpiece or free-flow air supply hose may connect to the mask in various ways, including:-

- Connection of surface supply and bailout hoses to a bailout block on the mask frame, typically at the right temple. From there integral plumbing takes the air to the integral demand valve and free-flow/defog port.
- Demand valve rigidly connected to the lower part of the frame, with external bailout block.
- Demand valve or rebreather mouthpiece plugged into the lower part of the frame.
- Demand valve plugged into a port on the side of the lower part of the frame (for bailout).
- Twin hoses ported through the lower part of the window, as in the Siebe Gorman aqualunger's full-face mask.
- Through the mask's flexible skirt at the bottom, as with Siebe Gorman frogman's masks, for example the Siebe Gorman CDBA.
- The early DESCO full-face mask's twin breathing hoses entered through the skirt at the sides, level with the lower end of the nose, pointing backwards and a bit downwards, to keep the breathing tubes shorter to reduce the risk of snagging.
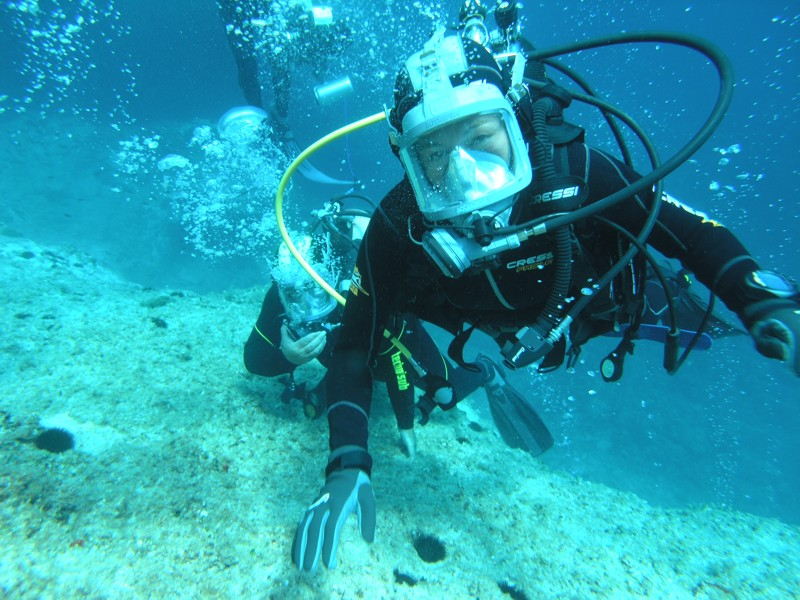
AGA mask with through-water comms.

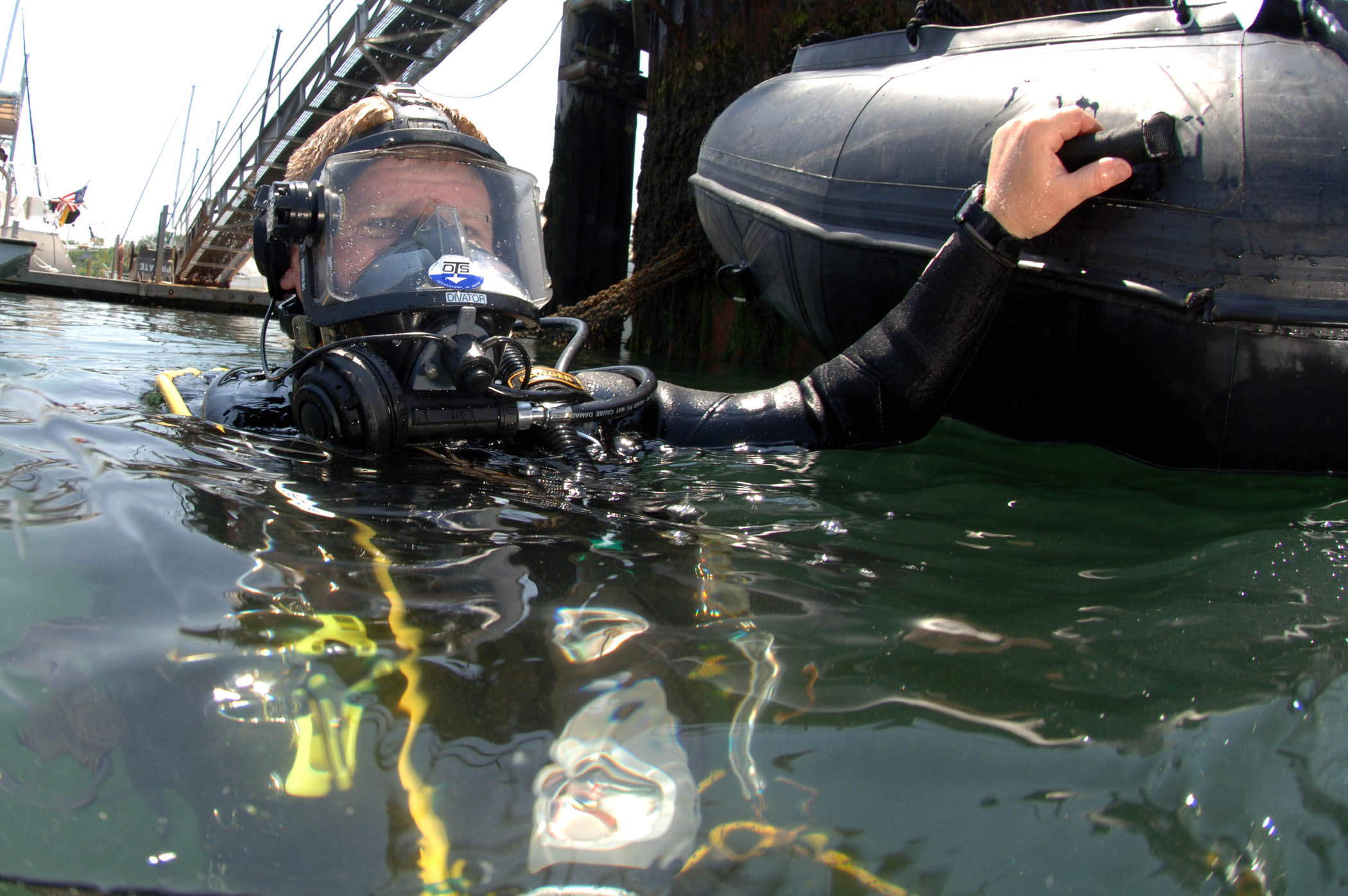
Military diver with full face mask with through-water comms.

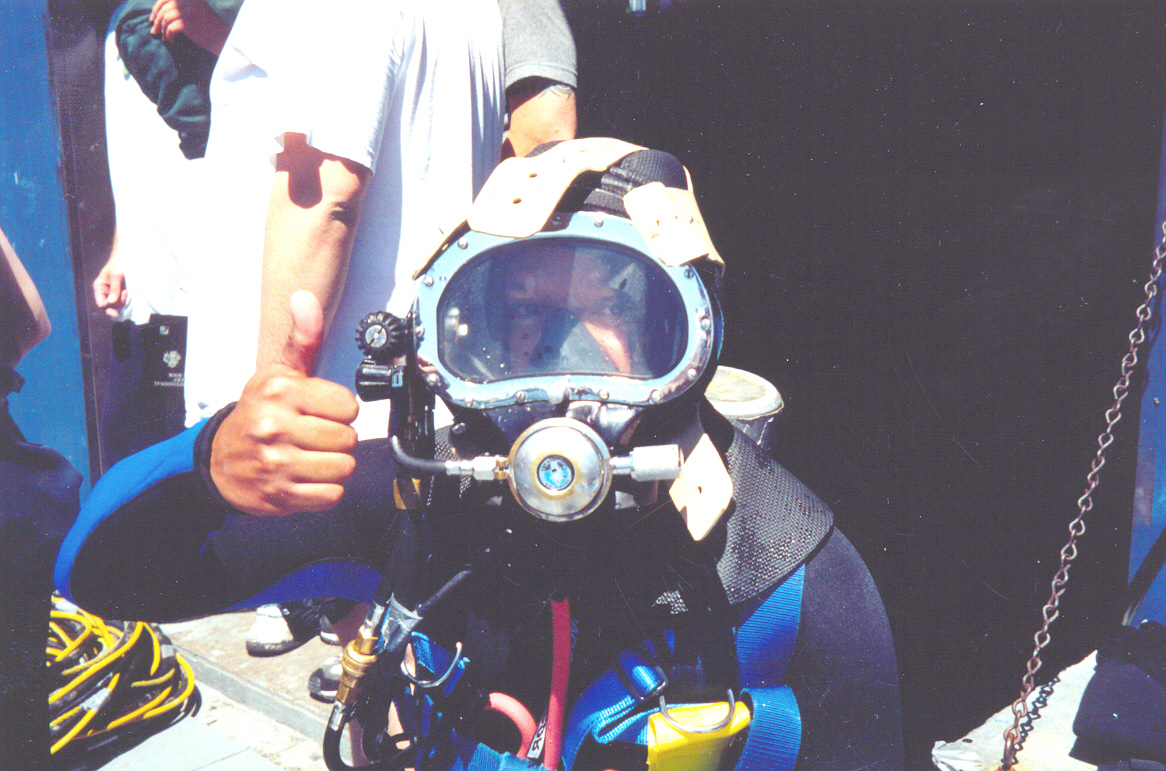
Kirby-Morgan band mask.

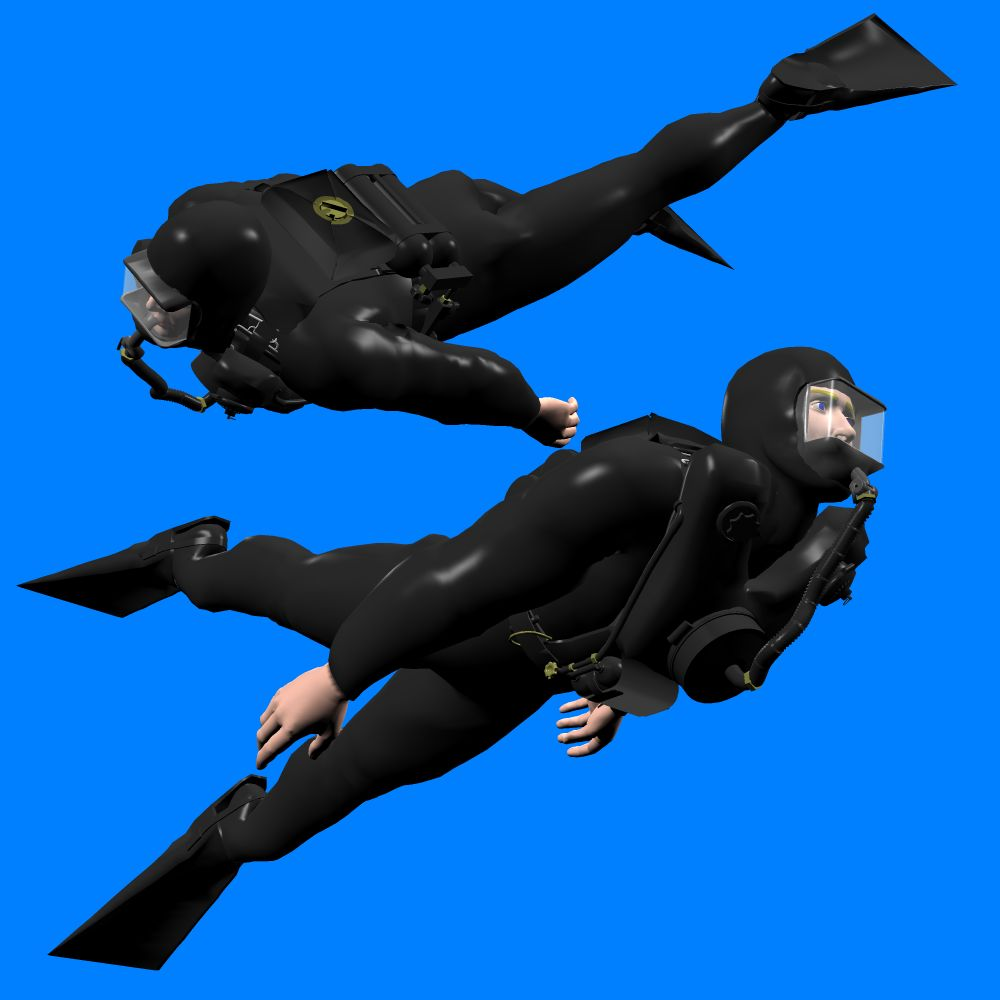
CGI image of 2 divers swimming with CDBA British armed forces rebreathers with Admiralty pattern full face masks

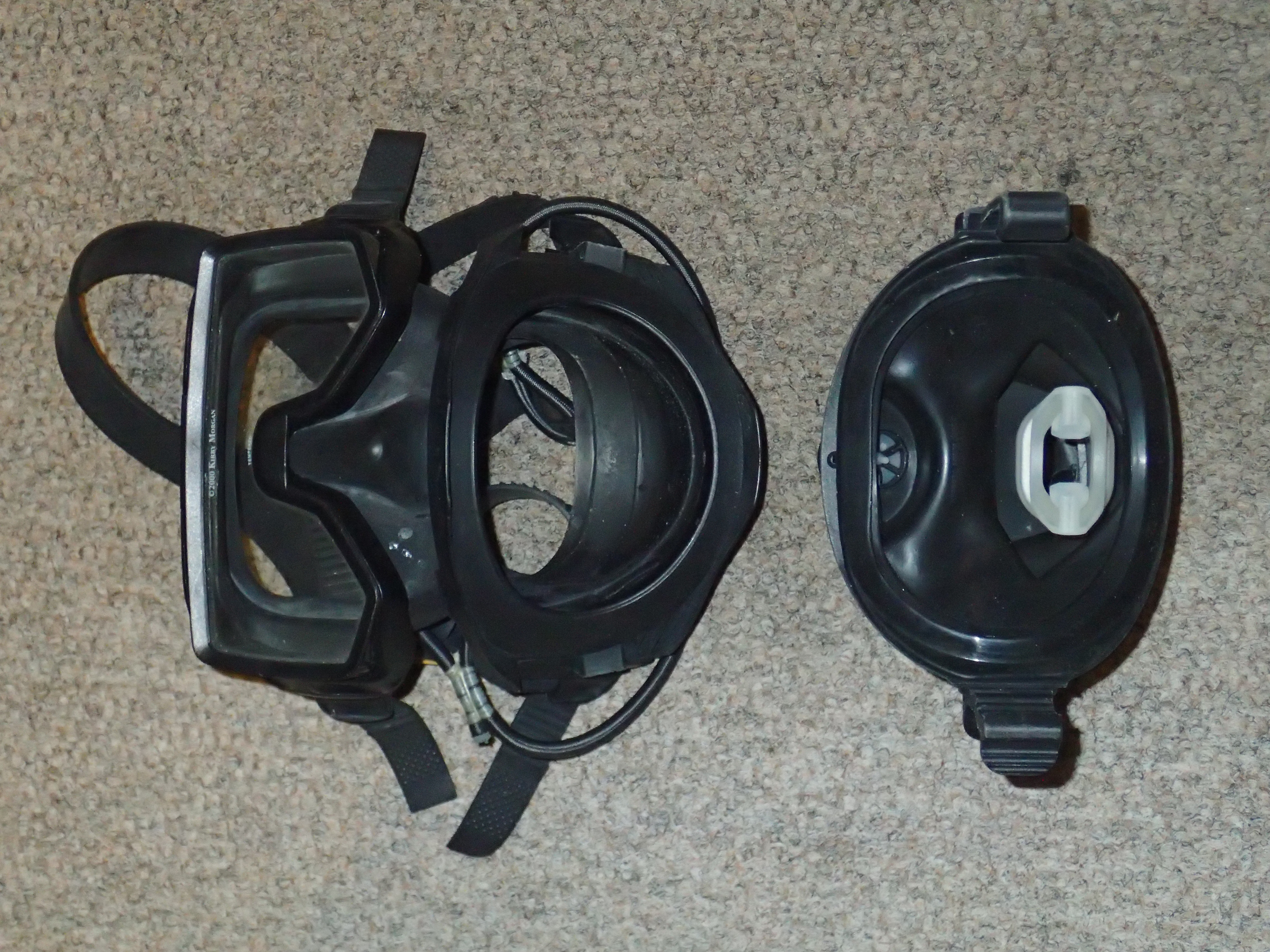
Kirby Morgan KM-48 Supermask full face diving mask. Mask and pod split showing mating surfaces

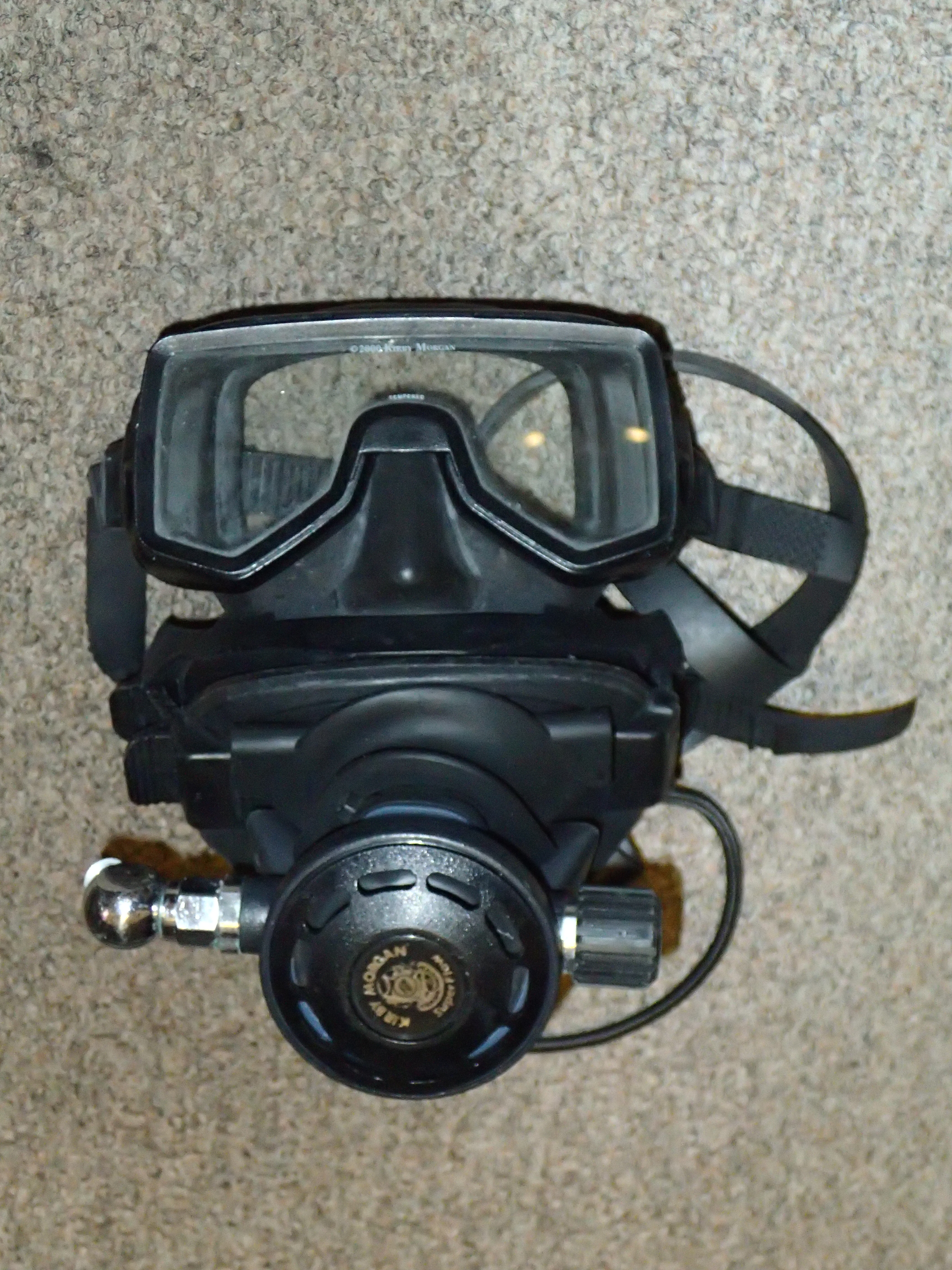
KM-48 Supermask assembled view from directly in front

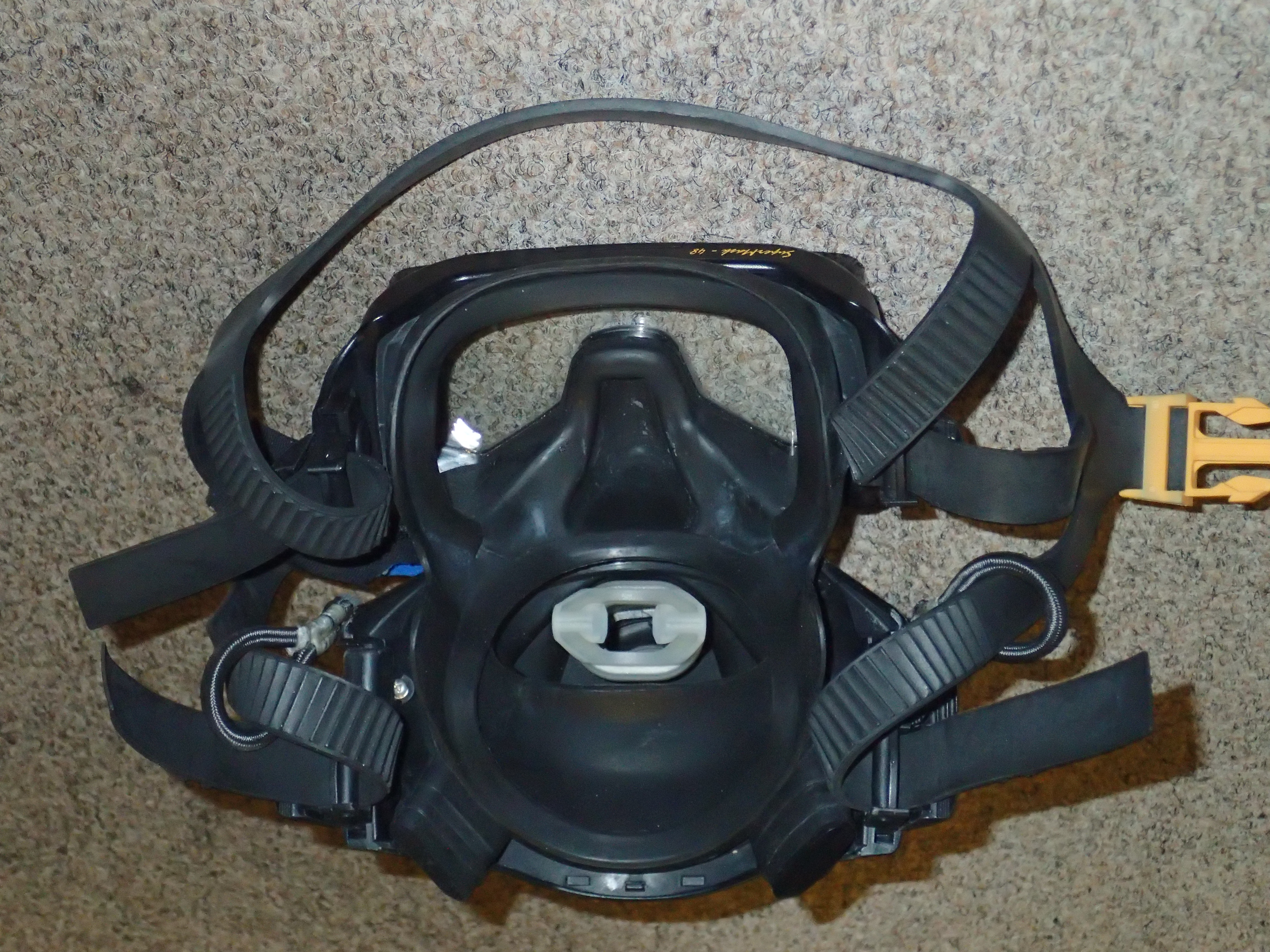
KM-48 Supermask assembled view of inside from back

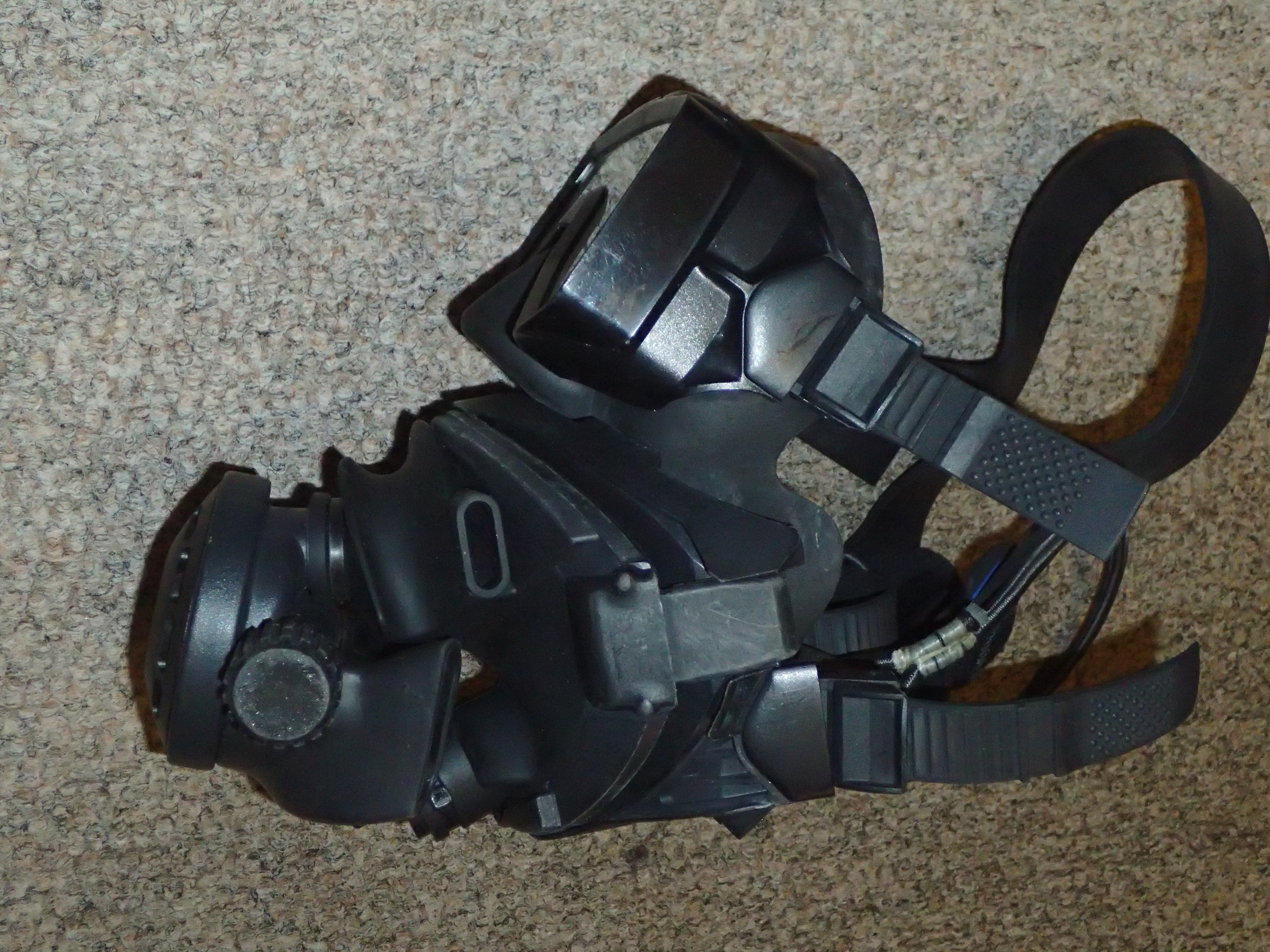
KM-48 Supermask assembled, seen from left

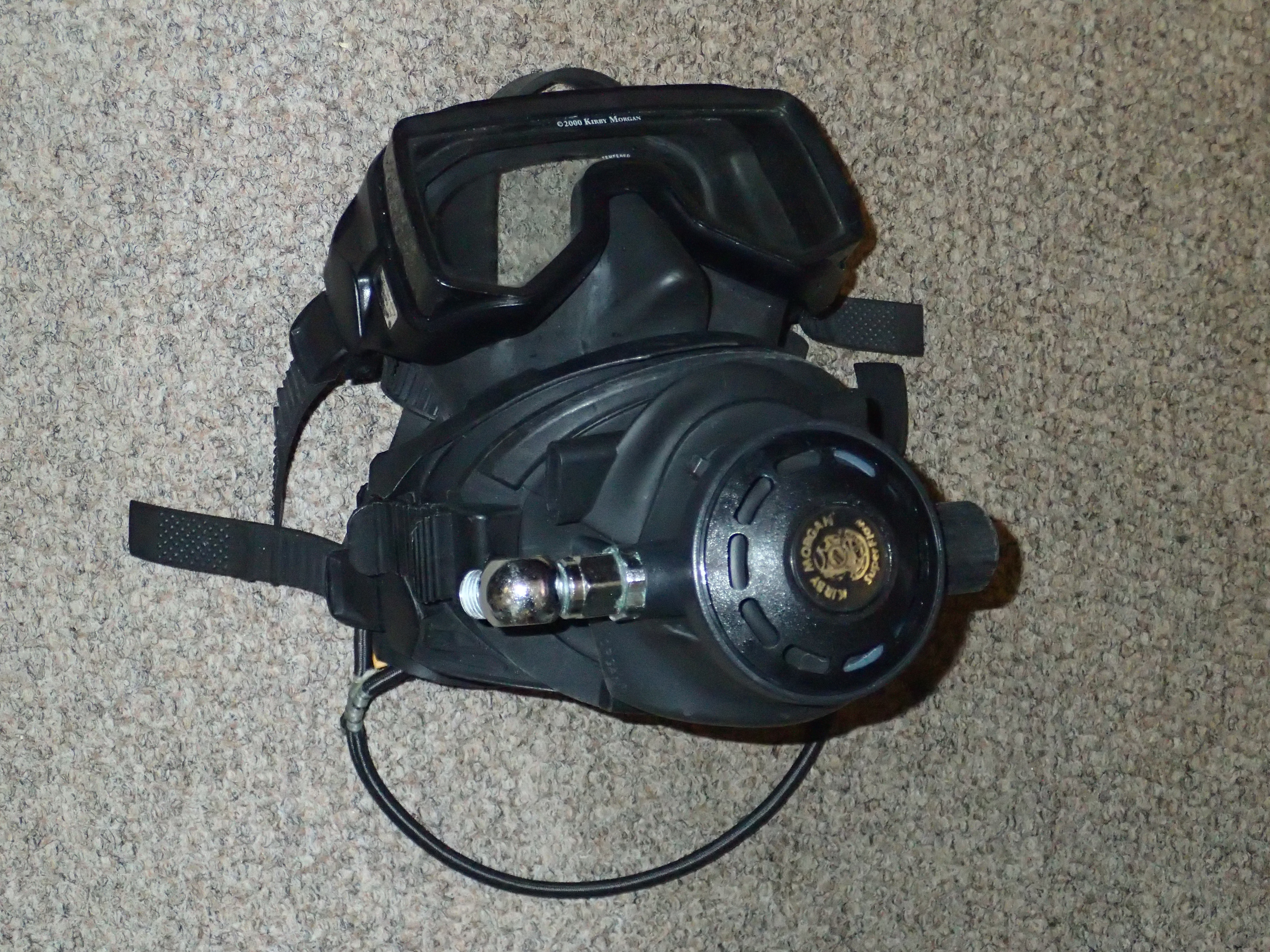
KM-48 Supermask assembled view from lower front right

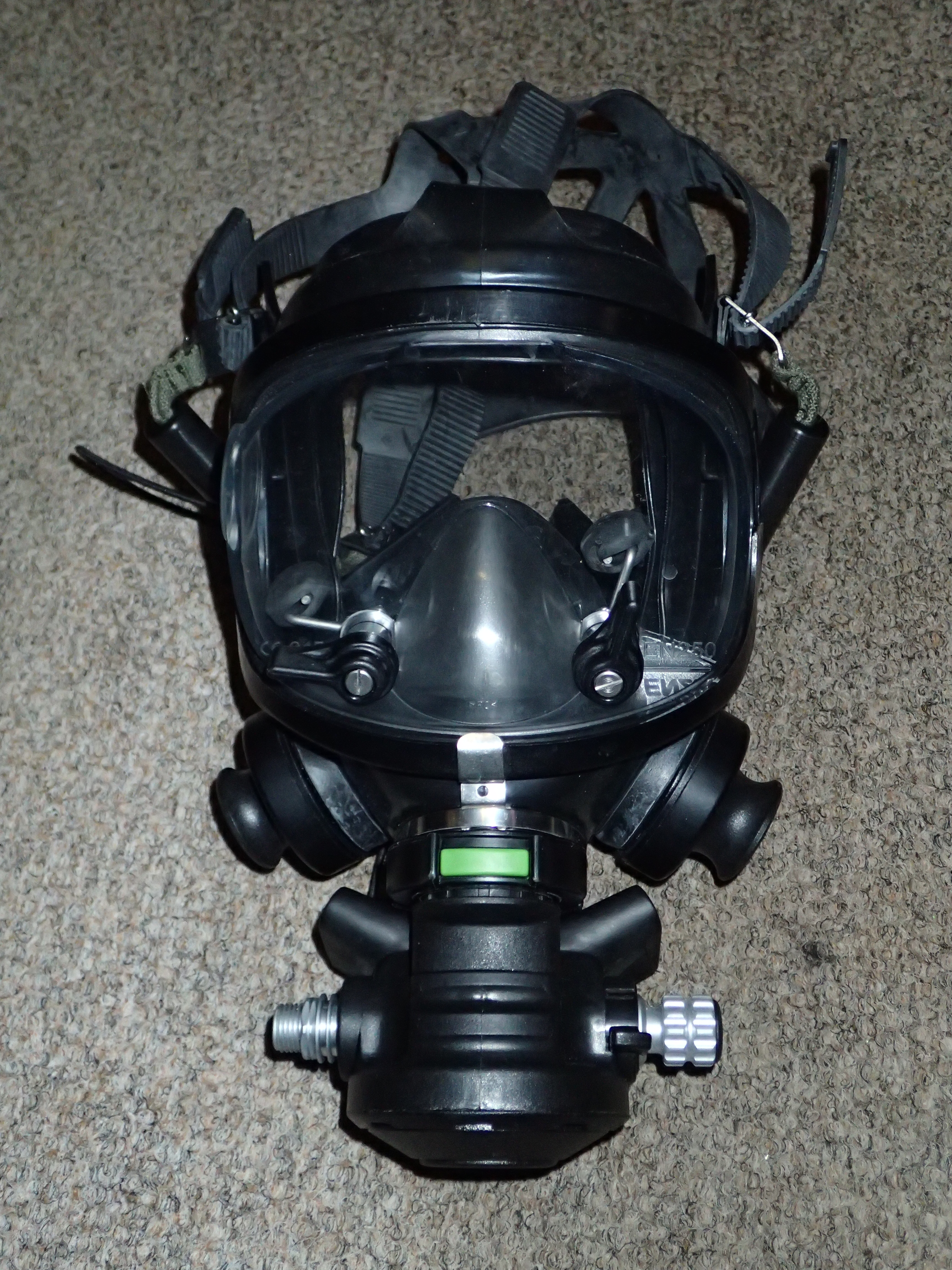
Draeger Panorama full-face mask with Apeks P-ported demand valve. Upper front view.

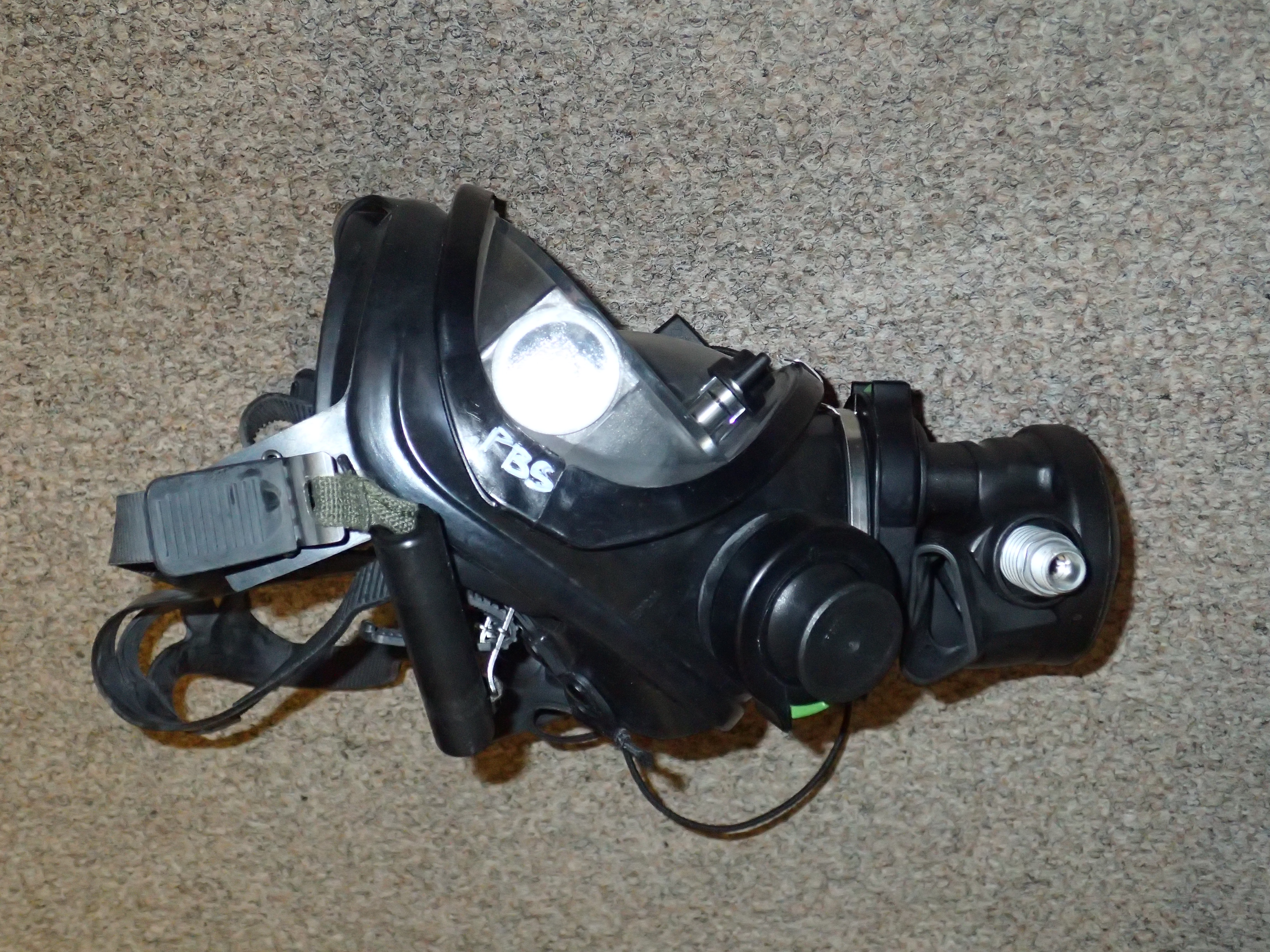
Draeger Panorama profile view from right side

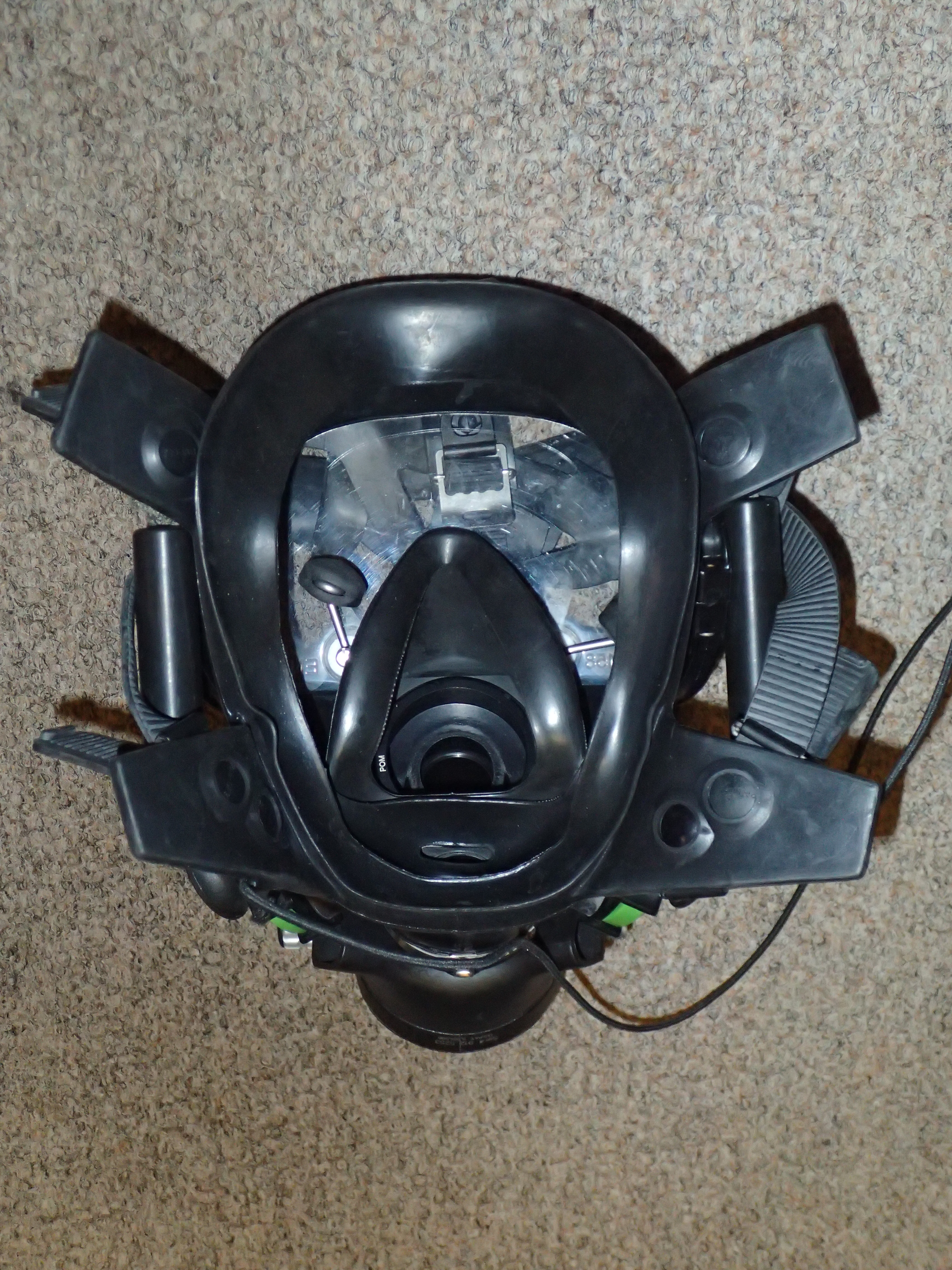
Draeger Panorama inside view from behind.

== Operation ==
=== Fitting ===
The full-face mask is generally the last piece of equipment fitted before the dive, as it is cumbersome and makes fitting other equipment more difficult by restricting the diver's field of vision, and the mobility of the head. The fitting may require the help of an attendant, particularly for the heavier band masks. The straps must be tensioned sufficiently to ensure a good seal, and to hold the mask securely to the diver's head, but not so tight as to cause discomfort during the dive. It is possible to adjust the fit to some extent during the dive.

=== Clearing ===
Water which enters the air spaces of the mask may be expelled either under the lower edge of the skirt, or through the exhaust port of the demand valve, or through a drain valve fitted for this purpose.

=== Equalising ===
The full-face mask must provide a means for the diver to block the nostrils for equalizing the middle ears. This may be provided in several ways. Some masks have a soft rubber nose pocket which allows the diver to pinch the nose directly, some have a soft cushion which can be pressed against the lower part of the nose to occlude the nostrils, and others have a mechanism which applies soft levers to the sides of the nose to pinch it in the same way that it would be done with fingers. The details of these mechanisms varies, but they all work. Some need to be adjusted to suit the individual diver, others are sufficiently flexible to fit almost anyone.

=== Defogging ===
Most full-face masks do not have fresh airflow directly over the interior of the faceplate, and are to some extent susceptible to fogging by condensation during a dive. This may be minimized by application of a demister surfactant before the dive, by rinsing during the dive, or in those cases where the system allows, by purging the mask through a free-flow/defog valve, which directs a flow of dry air over the inner surface of the faceplate. This facility uses a lot of air, and is usually only available on models intended primarily for surface supplied applications.

Some British Army and Russian gas masks are designed so that when the wearer breathes in, the inflow of air blows over the inside of the mask window and tends to evaporate any mist deposit on it. This feature is also found on the original Kirby Morgan EXO-26 mask, but the later EXO-BR uses an oro-nasal inner mask to reduce dead space.

=== Bailout ===
Emergency provision of an alternative breathing gas source is required in case of a failure of the primary gas supply. This is managed in several ways by full face masks.

The most prevalent method for masks intended for surface supply applications is known as a bailout valve. The surface supplied diver generally carries a bailout gas supply sufficient to reach a place of safety based on the planned dive profile. This gas supply is regulated by a scuba first stage regulator, and plumbed into the primary air supply circuit via a bailout valve before it reaches the demand valve. The full face masks designed for surface supply work usually mount this valve on the side of the mask frame, in the bailout block, where it is convenient and easily reached by the diver. The bailout cylinder valve is normally open during the dive. To switch to bailout, the diver simply opens the bailout valve, and is immediately supplied by gas from the bailout cylinder.

A similar functionality can be provided for masks without an integral bailout block, by mounting an external bailout block at a convenient place on the diver's harness. Surface supply and bailout supply hoses are connected to this block, which works exactly the same way as the integral block. The same method can be used for open circuit scuba diving, but this only allows for a single gas switch. Gas manifolds with more than two gas supply options are technically possible, but allow for a wider range of operator error and are therefore considered high risk, as the consequences of switching to a gas unsuitable for the current depth may be fatal. This system does not allow for supply of bailout gas to another diver. This system is used for most full face masks, as they have no other option. Surface supplied divers use the pneumofathometer hose to supply gas to another diver.

Rebreather systems which use a bailout valve on the mouthpiece are often the method of choice for use with full-face masks, as the bailout mechanism is provided in the mouthpiece, and works the same whether used with a full-face mask or a half mask.

A few models of full-face mask are provided with secondary ports to which additional demand valves can be connected, either by screw connector (Ocean Reef) or by bayonet style connector (Dräger). These allow for bailout or decompression gas to be ported to the mask via an entirely independent scuba set, but it is necessary to control which gas is used at any given time by using a valve on the supply line or cylinder. The Dräger Panorama mask also allows the primary demand valve to be unplugged from the mask and a bailout demand valve to be substituted. This can be done underwater with very little water ingress to the mask, and is closely equivalent to switching demand valves with a half mask, but a little slower and more complex.

The Kirby-Morgan KM 48 Supermask is unique, in that the airspace for the eyes is completely separate from the mouth area, and the mask can be worn as a half mask by leaving off the mouthpiece pod, which holds the demand valve or rebreather mouthpiece. This allows bailout to a standard scuba demand valve with mouth grip, but also allows the diver to carry bailout gas fitted to a second pod, which can be clipped to the mask when the primary pod has been unclipped. This can be done underwater, and as there is a standard mouthpiece inside the pod, breathing can commence before the pod is fully connected and sealed. The pod can be cleared of water after sealing, and the eye-space is not affected by the switch. A final alternative sometimes used by recreational divers, is to bail out to a standard demand valve by removing the full face mask completely, and then fitting a backup half mask.

== Safety ==
It may take a fairly long time to remove the mask to switch to breathing from the atmosphere. To avoid this, some full-face masks have a valve to switch between breathing from the set and breathing from atmosphere. The 'dive/surface valve', or 'snorkel valve', should be easily operated by the diver, even if wearing thick diving gloves, but not projecting so far that it can be easily knocked against things in low visibility water or in the dark, or in hand-to-hand combat underwater.

A full-face mask provides better security of breathing gas supply than a half-mask if there is a risk of the diver losing consciousness underwater.

The mask faceplate is generally a high impact strength polymer which is securely attached to the skirt or frame. A failure of the faceplate can be a life-threatening incident with some full face masks, as the water will flood into the oro-nasal inner mask and compromise the air supply. This problem is avoided by the masks which include a mouthpiece.

Not all divers will get a satisfactory seal from the skirt of any given full-face mask, as face shapes and sizes differ, but most divers will be able to find a mask that works for them. A major flood caused by a temporarily dislodged mask is easily drained by purging after replacing it in the correct position, and adjusting the straps if necessary. Lesser leaks will usually drain automatically from the mask through the exhaust valve of the demand valve or a purge valve fitted for that purpose as long as the mask is orientated with the valve at the low point. If there is too much water in the mask to allow inhalation it can usually be cleared using the purge button on the demand valve.

== History ==
A full face diving mask was invented by Yves le Prieur in 1933.

The free-flow type of full-face mask is also sometimes referred to as a Jack Browne rig, named for a DESCO engineer who designed an early version of a full-face mask with a surface-supplied free-flow air supply.

== See also ==
- Self-contained breathing apparatus – Breathing gas supplied respirator carried by the user, many of them have full-face masks.
- Gas mask – Protection from inhaling airborne pollutants and toxic gases, most gas masks are full-face masks.
- Diving helmet – Rigid head enclosure for underwater diving
- Diving mask – Face cover to improve underwater vision
