= Honey Locust Honky Tonk =

Studio album by Robert Pollard
- Released: July 9, 2013
- Genre: Pop, indie rock
- Length: 33:57
- Label: GBV Inc. (US); Fire (UK)
- Producer: Todd Tobias

Robert Pollard chronology
Jack Sells the Cow (2012)	Honey Locust Honky Tonk (2013)	Blazing Gentlemen (2013)

Professional ratings
Aggregate scores
Source	Rating
Metacritic	76/100
Review scores
Source	Rating
Allmusic	3.5/5 stars
MusicOMH	4/5 stars
Pitchfork Media	(7.4/10)

Honey Locust Honky Tonk is the 19th studio album by American musician Robert Pollard. It was released in July 2013 under GBV Inc. Records.

== Track list ==
No.	Title	Length
1.	"He Requested Things"	2:38
2.	"Circus Green Machine"	1:23
3.	"Strange and Pretty Day"	2:12
4.	"Suit Minus the Middle"	0:50
5.	"Drawing A Picture"	1:44
6.	"Who Buries The Undertaker?"	2:25
7.	"She Hides In Black"	2:42
8.	"Her Eyes Play Tricks On The Camera"	2:32
9.	"Find A Word"	1:27
10.	"I Have To Drink"	0:43
11.	"Flash Gordon Style"	2:08
12.	"Igloo Hearts"	1:38
13.	"Shielding Whatever Needs You"	1:12
14.	"I Killed A Man Who Looks Like You"	1:52
15.	"Real Fun Is No One's Monopoly"	2:25
16.	"It Disappears in the Least Likely Hands (We May Never Not Know)"	2:31
17.	"Airs"	3:35
