= Loser =

Loser or Losers may refer to:

- A person, or people, who experience failure
- The unsuccessful social class in winner and loser culture

== Film and television ==
=== Film ===
- Loser (1996 film), an American drama film
- Loser (2000 film), an American comedy film
- Losers (film), a 2015 Bulgarian comedy-drama film

=== Television ===
- Loser (TV series), a 2020 Indian drama television series
- "Loser" (Grounded for Life), a 2001 television sitcom episode
- Losers (TV series), a 2019 American documentary television series
- Loser, a character from the fourth season of Battle for Dream Island, an animated web series
- L.O.S.E.R.S., fictional characters featured in The Fairly OddParents

== Literature and publications ==
- Loser (novel), a 2002 novel by Jerry Spinelli
- The Loser, a 1983 novel by Thomas Bernhard

== Music ==
=== Bands ===
- Loser (band), an American rock band
- Losers (band), a British rock band

=== Albums ===
- Losers (album), a 1990 album by Sentridoh

=== Songs ===
- "Loser" (3 Doors Down song), a song from the album The Better Life
- "Loser" (Beck song), a 1993 single
- "Loser" (BigBang song), a 2015 single
- "Loser" (Tame Impala song), a song from the album Deadbeat
- "Losers" (song), a 2024 song by Post Malone
- "Loser", a song by Jerry Garcia from the album Garcia
- "Loser"/"Number Nine", a 2016 single by Kenshi Yonezu
- "Loser", a song by Alma from the album Have U Seen Her?
- "Loser", a song by Ayreon from the album The Human Equation
- "Loser", a song by Charlie Puth from the album Charlie
- "Loser", a song by Jim Martin from the album Milk and Blood
- "Loser", a song by Limp Bizkit from the album Gold Cobra
- "Loser", a song by MC Cheung from the album Have A Good Time
- "Losers", a song by the Belle Brigade from the album The Belle Brigade
- "Losers", a song by the Cardigans from the album First Band on the Moon
- "Losers", a song by The Weeknd from the album Beauty Behind the Madness

== Other uses ==
- In contract bridge, a card which will never win a trick
- Loser (hand gesture), a hand gesture made by extending the thumb and index fingers, leaving the other fingers closed to create the letter L, interpreted as "loser", and generally given as a demeaning sign
- Loser (mountain), a mountain in Ausseerland, Styria, Austria
- Loser, one of the three peaks in the Leuser Range
- Loser.com, a domain name and URL redirect that has existed since 1995

== See also ==
- Lose (disambiguation)
- The Losers (disambiguation)
- Lovable loser, a character archetype
- Losar, a new year festival in Tibetan Buddhism
