= Losing You =

Losing You may refer to:

== Literature ==
- Losing You (novel), by Nicci French (2006)

== Music ==
- "Losing You" (Brenda Lee song) (1963)
- "Losing You" (Dead by April song) (2009)
- "Losing You" (Eiffel 65 song) (2002)
- "Losing You" (Ephixa and Laura Brehm song) (2017)
- "Losing You" (Sharon O'Neill song) (1983)
- "Losing You" (Solange song) (2012)
- "Losing You", a song by Blackbear from Anonymous (2019)
- "Losing You", a song by Busted from Busted (2002)
- "Losing You", a song by Dusty Springfield (1964)
- "Losing You", a song by Jeff Lynne's ELO from From Out of Nowhere (2019)
- "Losing You", a song by Milky Chance from Blossom (2017)
- "Losing You", a song by Randy Newman from Harps and Angels (2008)
- "Losing You", a song by Flo, (2022)
- "Losin' You", a song by Tim McGraw from Damn Country Music (2015)
- "Losing U", a song by Amerie from Because I Love It (2007)

== See also ==
- I'm Losing You (disambiguation)
