= Loss =

Loss may refer to:

- Economic loss
- Grief, an emotional response to loss
  - Animal loss, grief over the loss of an animal

== Mathematics, science, and technology ==
- Angular misalignment loss, power loss caused by the deviation from optimum angular alignment
- Bridging loss, the loss that results when an impedance is connected across a transmission line
- Coupling loss, the loss that occurs when energy is transferred from one circuit, optical device, or medium to another
- Insertion loss, the decrease in transmitted signal power resulting from the insertion of a device in a transmission line or optical fiber
- Dielectric loss, a dielectric material's inherent dissipation of electromagnetic energy
- Loss function, in statistics, a function representing the cost associated with an event
- Path loss, the attenuation undergone by an electromagnetic wave in transit from a transmitter to a receiver
  - Free-space path loss, the loss in signal strength that would result if all influences were sufficiently removed having no effect on its propagation
- Return loss, the ratio of the amplitude of the reflected wave to the amplitude of the incident wave
- Round-trip loss in laser physics refers to energy lost due to scattering or absorption
- Switching loss, power loss incured due to circuit switching
- Lick Observatory Supernova Search (LOSS) program

== Arts, entertainment, and media ==
=== Music ===
==== Albums ====
- Loss (Bass Communion album) (2006)
- Loss (Mull Historical Society album) (2001)

==== Songs ====
- "Losses" (song), 2020 song by Lil Tjay
- "Loss", a song by God Is an Astronaut from their self-titled album (2008)
- "Loss", a song by Madder Mortem from Mercury (1999)
- "Loss", a song by Underoath from The Place After This One (2025)
- "Losses", a song by Drake from Dark Lane Demo Tapes (2020)
- "Losses", a song by Polo G from Hall of Fame (2021)

=== Other uses in arts, entertainment, and media ===
- "Loss" (Ctrl+Alt+Del), a webcomic strip and internet meme
- Loss (film), a 2008 film by Maris Martinsons
- Lord Loss (character), a character from Darren Shan's The Demonata
- "The Loss", a 1990 episode of Star Trek: The Next Generation

== Other uses ==
- Loss (surname)
- Loss (baseball), a pitching statistic in baseball
- League of Secessionist States (LoSS), an intermicronational organisation

== See also ==
- Attenuation, a reduction in amplitude and intensity of a signal
- Lose (disambiguation)
- Lost (disambiguation)
- Losing (disambiguation)
- Stop loss (disambiguation)
