= Blazing Gentlemen =

Studio album by Robert Pollard
- Released: December 10, 2013
- Genre: Rock
- Labels: Guided by Voices Inc. (US); Fire (UK)
- Producer: Todd Tobias

Robert Pollard chronology
Honey Locust Honky Tonk (2013)	Blazing Gentlemen (2013)	Faulty Superheroes (2015)

Professional ratings
Aggregate scores
Source	Rating
Metacritic	70/100
Review scores
Source	Rating
AllMusic	4/5 stars
Consequence of Sound	3/5 stars
Paste Magazine	(6.0/10)
Pitchfork Media	(5.7/10)
PopMatters	(7/10)

Blazing Gentlemen is the 20th studio album by American musician Robert Pollard. It was released in December 2013 under Guided by Voices Records.

== Track listing ==
No.	Title	Length
1.	"Magic Man Hype"
2.	"Blazing Gentleman"
3.	"Red Flag Down"
4.	"Storm Center Level Seven"
5.	"Return of the Drums"
6.	"Piccadilly Man"
7.	"Professional Goose Trainer"
8.	"Extra Fool's Day"
9.	"1000 Royalty Street"
10.	"My Museum Needs An Elevator"
11.	"Tonight's the Rodeo"
12.	"Tea People"
13.	"Faking the Boy Scouts"
14.	"Triple Sec Venus"
15.	"This Place Has Everything"
16.	"Lips of Joy"
