= Stop-loss =

Stop-loss may refer to:

- Stop-loss insurance, an insurance policy that goes into effect after a set amount is paid in claims
- Stop-loss order, stock or commodity market order to close a position if/when losses reach a threshold
- Stop-loss policy, US military requirement for soldiers to remain in service beyond their normal discharge date
- Stop-loss variant, a genetic variant that causes loss of a stop codon

== In media ==
- Stop-Loss (film), a 2008 film about soldiers subject to the stop-loss policy
- "Stop-Loss" (Dollhouse), an episode of the TV series Dollhouse

== See also ==
- Escalation of commitment
