= Lose =

Lose may refer to:

- Lose (album), the third studio album by American indie rock band Cymbals Eat Guitars
- "Lose" (song), by KSI and Lil Wayne, 2021
- "Lose", a song by Travis Scott from his 2016 album Birds in the Trap Sing McKnight
- League of Super Evil, a Canadian animated television series produced by Nerd Corps Entertainment in conjunction with YTV
- Lightweight Oxygen Swimmers Equipment, a diving rebreather formerly made by Siebe Gorman, similar to a Swimmer Canoeist's Breathing Apparatus

== See also ==
- Lose/Lose, 2009 art video game
- Loser (disambiguation)
- Losing (disambiguation)
- Loss (disambiguation)
- Lose It (disambiguation)
