= I'm Losing You =

I'm Losing You may refer to:

- "(I Know) I'm Losing You", a 1966 song by The Temptations
- I'm Losing You (novel), a 1996 novel by Bruce Wagner
  - I'm Losing You (film), a 1998 film by Bruce Wagner adapted from the novel
- "I'm Losing You" (John Lennon song), a 1980 song by John Lennon from Double Fantasy
- "(No, No) I'm Losing You", a 1965 song by Aretha Franklin
- "I'm Losing You", a 1968 Gary Puckett & The Union Gap song from their album Young Girl
