= Losing It =

Losing It may refer to:

== Books ==
- Losing It (book), a 2008 autobiography by Valerie Bertinelli

== Film and TV ==
- Losing It, a 2006 TV film starring Martin Clunes
- Losing It with John Stamos, an American talk show
- Losing It With Jillian, The Biggest Loser spinoff with Jillian Michaels
- "Losing It" (Bad Girls), a 2000 TV episode

== Music ==
- "Losing It" (song), by Australian producer Fisher, 2018
- "Losing It", song by Rush from the album Signals
- "Losing It", song by Kurt Vile & the Violators from the EP The Hunchback, 2009
- "Losing It (Song for Abigail)", song by The Boo Radleys from the album Everything's Alright Forever, 1992
- "Losing It", song by Robert Pollard from the album Of Course You Are, 2016
- "Losing It", track from The Wizard of Lies soundtrack

== See also ==
- Losin' It, 1983 American-Canadian comedy film
- "Losin' It", a 2008 song by Rock City
