= Bustin' Loose =

Bustin' Loose or Busting Loose may refer to:

- Busting Loose (TV series), a 1977 American television series
- Bustin' Loose (Chuck Brown album), a 1979 album released by Chuck Brown & the Soul Searchers
  - "Bustin' Loose" (song), the title song
- Bustin' Loose (film), a 1981 film
  - Bustin' Loose (Roberta Flack album), the soundtrack to the 1981 film
  - Bustin' Loose (TV series), a 1987–1988 American television show based on the film
- Busting Loose (album), a 2003 album by Peggy Scott-Adams
