= The Belle Brigade (album) =

2011 studio album by the Belle Brigade

Studio album by The Belle Brigade
- Released: April 19, 2011
- Recorded: 2010–2011
- Length: 43:11
- Label: Reprise
- Producers: The Belle Brigade; Matthew Wilder

The Belle Brigade chronology
The Belle Brigade (2011)	Just Because (2014)

Singles from The Belle Brigade
- 1. "Losers" Released: January 19, 2011; 2. "Where Not to Look For Freedom" Released: March 22, 2011

Professional ratings
Review scores
Source	Rating
AllMusic	3.5/5 stars

The Belle Brigade is the debut studio album by American band The Belle Brigade, released on April 19, 2011. It was co-produced by them and Matthew Wilder. It was listed as one of the best albums released in 2011 by Paste magazine.

== Singles ==
The first single to be released from the album was "Losers". The follow-up single "Where Not to Look for Freedom" was released on March 22, 2011.

== Track listing ==
No.	Title	Length
1.	"Sweet Louise"	3:07
2.	"Where Not to Look for Freedom"	4:24
3.	"Losers"	4:02
4.	"Belt of Orion"	3:18
5.	"Shirt"	4:26
6.	"Lucky Guy"	3:42
7.	"Lonely Lonely"	2:39
8.	"Punch Line"	3:30
9.	"Rusted Wheel"	4:00
10.	"My Goodness"	2:58
11.	"Fasten You to Me"	3:30

== Charts ==
Chart (2011)	Peak position
US Heatseekers Albums (Billboard)	17

== Release history ==
Region	Date
United States	April 19, 2011
