= Loss (surname) =

Loss is a surname. Notable people with the surname include:

- Daniel Loss (born 1958), Swiss theoretical physicist
- Joe Loss (1909–1990), British bandleader and musician
- Louis Loss (1914–1997), American legal scholar
- Michael Loss (born 1954), American mathematician and mathematical physicist
- Osmar Loss (born 1975), Brazilian professional football manager
