= The Losers (Howard Stern) =

The Losers were a band made up of staff members of The Howard Stern Show. The group was formed in 1997 when the show staff started playing with instruments that Green Day had brought to the studio prior to their own performance. The band was named after their original drummer Scott the Engineer, who the other members of the show staff consider a loser. In the late nineties the band played with Jenny Jones, James Brown, Willie Nelson and Barry Williams and made an appearance on Magic Johnson's talk show, The Magic Hour on July 3, 1998 to perform a flatulence-filled version of "Wipe Out".

== Battle of the Bands (2000–2003) ==
The band has taken on various celebrity bands in battle of the bands competitions over the years. The premise behind the band is that a band made up of non-musicians can beat any celebrity-fronted band put in front of them. Every time The Losers battled a band, three judges were chosen by a third party and were people in the record industry. Howard and The Losers went first, the challengers second and all judging was done at the end. All were unanimous in The Losers' favor except for when Chris Jericho's band Fozzy performed "To Kill a Stranger" from their 2002 album, Happenstance. One judge voted for Fozzy. After the contest Stern announced that it had been the band's final appearance. Although Stern brought the band back in 2007 for an avant-garde jam session they haven't battled other bands since Fozzy.

According to Chris Jericho in his autobiography, Stern stopped going head to head with other celebrity bands because he felt Jericho's band had won, but the judges scored it 2-1 for the Losers. Fozzy was the only band to ever take a vote from Howard's band.

=== List of battles ===
Date	Celebrity	Band	Song Performed by The Losers
June 20, 2000	Tina Yothers	Jaded	"The Court of the Crimson King"
August 18, 2000	Tim Russ	Tim Russ with Neil Norman's Cosmic Orchestra	"The Hurdy Gurdy Man"
January 18, 2001	Doug Flutie	The Flutie Brothers Band	"Bang a Gong"
June 25, 2002	Corey Feldman	Corey Feldman's Truth Movement	"Spirit in the Sky"
March 26, 2003	Chris Jericho	Fozzy	"Old Man"

== Members ==
Although the lineup has changed over the years, two members have always been in the band:

- Howard Stern - leading vocals, keyboards, guitar
- Fred Norris - lead guitar, backing vocals, bass guitar, sound effects

Others over years included:

- Jackie "The Joke Man" Martling - backing vocals, lead guitar and leading vocals on "On the Road Again", rhythm guitar, gong, bass guitar, keyboards
- Stuttering John - backing vocals, bass guitar, drums
- Scott the Engineer - drums
- Gary Dell'Abate - trumpet, leading vocals on "These Teeth Are Made For Chomping" parody song
- Robin Quivers - backing vocals, leading vocals on "These Boots Are Made for Walkin'", tambourine
- Brian the Intern - drums
- Joe the Intern - drums
- Artie Lange - backing vocals
- Richard Christy - drums

Members taken from outside the Stern Show staff:

- Frank Fallon - drums
- Lynn Portas - backing vocals on "Old Man"
- Ryan Berkowitz - backing vocals on "Old Man"
- Maria Nazzaro - farting on "Wipe Out"
- Chris Cirri aka Chris Crap - farting on "Wipe Out"
- Jeremy the Farter - farting on "Wipe Out"
- Dan the Farter - farting on "Rhythm of the Night"
- Adam Busch - Alto Saxophone on "Livin' La Vida Loca"
