= Bram De Looze =

Belgian jazz pianist

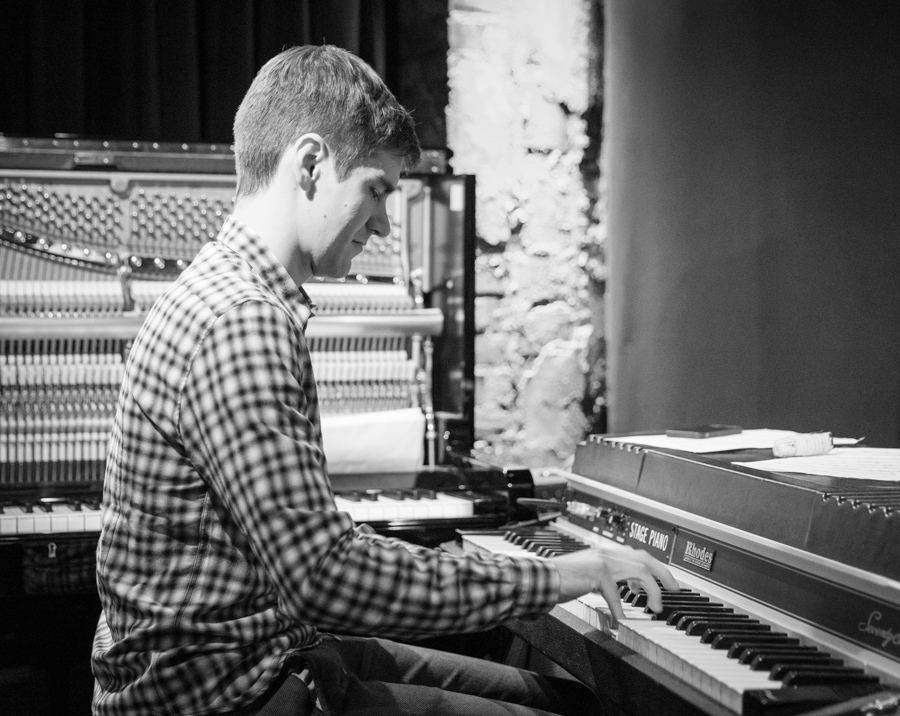

Background information
- Born: January 23, 1991 (age 34); Knokke-Heist, Belgium
- Genres: Jazz
- Occupation: Musician
- Instrument: Piano
- Labels: Outhere, Clean Feed, De Werf
- Website: bramdelooze.com

Bram De Looze (born 23 January 1991) is a Belgian jazz pianist who trained at the Lemmensinstituut and at the New School For Jazz and Contemporary Music (New York), under the tutelage of Uri Caine, Marc Copland, and Reggie Workman.

== Career ==
=== Solo projects ===
==== Piano e Forte (2017) ====
After paying a visit to Chris Maene’s collection of pianofortes, De Looze started a project using three such instruments, approaching their historical position from a contemporary viewpoint. Intrigued by the old pianos, their temperaments and moods, De Looze approaches them from a contemporary musical idiom. Each piano possesses its own unique sound, which is of primary importance in this project. In search of challenges, De Looze effortlessly plays with time and space, evoking different moods in order to eventually form a harmonious whole.

Improvisation is one of De Looze's strong suits and is, of course, an important part of this project as well. He keeps in mind the repertoire specifically written for the fortepiano, but he also uses his own pieces with fragments of music from the 19th century. For this major solo project, De Looze uses original pianos and replicas of some well-known piano makers such as Anton Walter, Pleyel or Erard. The resulting album Piano e Forte (2017) and accompanying tour were met with rave reviews. De Looze has already performed in venues like Bozar, Schouwburg Kortrijk and the Handelsbeurs in Ghent.

==== Switch The Stream (2018) ====
A year after Piano e Forte, De Looze recorded Switch The Stream (2018) with the revolutionary Chris Maene Straight Strung Grand Piano, which allowed him once again to combine historical roots with modern techniques and perspectives. Chris Maene specifically appointed De Looze as a jazz ambassador for a new instrument. This revolutionary piano was built at the request of Maestro Daniel Barenboim. With this project, De Looze has already played at the Handelsbeurs, Flagey and to a full house at KAAP.

==== Colour Talk (2020) ====
With his latest solo project ‘Colour Talk’, De Looze continues his trajectory with another revolutionary piano model, designed by lauded architect Rafael Viñoly, and a continued attempt to renew from within.

While still rooted in jazz, classical music and free improvisation have found a new balance, a coexistence that enables the pianist to express himself with a new vigour. ‘Colour Talk’ is once again an ode to (re)invention in the grey zone were the classical idiom and improvisatory urges meet.

=== Collaborations ===
==== LABtrio ====
The Belgian jazz trio LABtrio was founded in 2007 around Lander Gyselinck (drums), Anneleen Boehme (bass) and Bram De Looze. They won a number of competitions, including the 2008 Belfius Axion Classic competition and Brussels Jazz Marathon. In 2018, they received the Jong Jazztalent Gent award. In 2011, the band won the grand prize at the Tremplin Jazz d'Avignon international jazz competition.

==== Septych ====
In 2014, De Looze launched an ensemble consisting of two cello's, three horns, drums and a piano together with various improvisers such as Daniel Levin, Lester St-Louis, Robin Verheyen, Gebhard Ullman, Bo Van Der Werf and Flin van Hemmen.

The music reflects the high level of improvisational interplay and the orchestral possibility of a setting of this kind, as it also exploits the possibility of doubling cello's and tenor saxophones on the way. Bram De Looze aims for a primarily mid-ranged lineup of instruments, wherein its timbres fuse towards a colourful and captivating identity. An emphasis on rhythm, mysterious and intimate harmonies, from the brutal noise to the light and beautiful, open or preconceived ideas are main ingredients that are balanced out in the approach to the large diversity of ways to create music.

==== Fabrik ====
Fabrik is a Belgian-Dutch project with Bert Cools (guitar and synthesizer), Bram de Looze (piano), Thierry Castel (synthesizer and electronics) and Mark Schilders (drums, guitar and synthesizer). They have played at the BIMhuis Amsterdam, the Ham Sessions Festival, Ghent (B), Jazz in Duketown Festival, Den Bosch and Paradox Tilburg, among others.

==== Pentadox ====
Pentadox is a contemporary jazz trio consisting of Sylvain Debaisieux (tenor saxophone), Bram De Looze (piano) and Samuel Ber (drums). They incorporate elements of modern classical music and avant-garde and improvised music. Born in 2015 during a residency in Jazz Station (Brussels), the band was selected a few months later as Belgian finalist at B-Jazz International Contest and performed at Leuven Jazz Festival 2016. Their continued efforts were also rewarded in July 2018 by receiving the award for Young Jazz Talent Ghent at the Ghent Jazz Festival. In 2020, they were in the finals of the Avignon jazz festival.

The trio turned into an electro-acoustic sextet entitled “Fragments of Expansion” by adding Lester St Louis on cello, Nick Dunston on double bass and Weston Olencki on trombone and electronics. The possibilities for expanding a band's sound are multiple, and Pentadox has opted for an inner approach by inviting musicians with whom they have already worked in the past (as it is the case for Dunston and Ber, or St-Louis and De Looze) but they have also chosen to include electronics as a tool to encourage deep interaction and to open up their sonic identity to a larger field of possibilities (by inviting Olencki). With “Fragments of Expansion”, the ensemble transforms into an intercontinental project with a long-lasting impact, from its start as a residency, to a recording and a first concert at Gent Jazz Festival 2019 to a subsequent release tour.

==== Bram De Looze & Robin Verheyen Duo ====
With this duo project, Bram De Looze and Robin Verheyen focus on creative music with a fresh and contemporary statement characterised by much spontaneity. As a duo, they have been playing the repertoire of Thelonious Monk for several years.

==== MiXMONK ====
At BOZAR's request, De Looze & Verheyen ended up with the American percussionist Joey Baron. The trio went on a European tour and have performed in Paradox Tilburg, Het Wilde Westen in Kortrijk, La Dynamo in Paris, Tivoli Vredenburg in Utrecht, Bozar in Brussels and the Monk Café in Brussels. The concert in Paris was broadcast live on Radio France and the concert in the Monk Café was broadcast live on Radio Klara.

== Awards and honors ==
- Tremplin Jazz d'Avignon 2011: first prize and popular prize (LABtrio)
- Sabam Jazz Award Young Talent 2016: winner (Bram De Looze)
- Klara Award voor Jonge Belofte 2018: winner (Bram De Looze)
- Jong Jazztalent Gent 2018: winner (Pentadox)

== Discography ==
- Fluxus by LABTrio (Outnote/Outhere, 2013)
- Foster Treasures by De Looze/Machtel/De Waele (De Werf, 2013)
- Flux Project by Stephanos Chytiris (Pyrn, 2014)
- Coding of Evidentially by Dre Hocevar Trio (Clean Feed, 2015)
- Septych, by Bram De Looze/Septych (Clean Feed, 2015)
- The Howls Are Not What They Seem, by LABTrio (Outnote/Outhere, 2015)
- Urbex, by Antoine Pierre (Igloo, 2015)
- Collective Effervescence, by Dre Hocevar (Clean Feed, 2016)
- Piano e forte by Bram De Looze (Fuga Libera, 2017)
- Nature City by LABTrio (Outnote/Outhere, 2017)
- Fabrik by Mark Schilders (Mark Schilders, 2017)
- Switch The Stream by Bram De Looze (Outhere, 2018)
- MiXMONK by Bram De Looze, Robin Verheyen and Joey Baron (Universal Music Belgium, 2019)
- Colour Talk by Bram De Looze (sdban, 2020)
