= Loose coupling (disambiguation) =

Loose coupling is a system of software components that have little or no knowledge of the definitions of other components.

Loose coupling may also mean:

- Loose coupling, applied to organizational settings by Karl E. Weick
- Loose coupling in electronics, where an inductively coupled circuit has a low coupling coefficient
