= Siebe Gorman CDBA =

Type of diving rebreather used by the Royal Navy

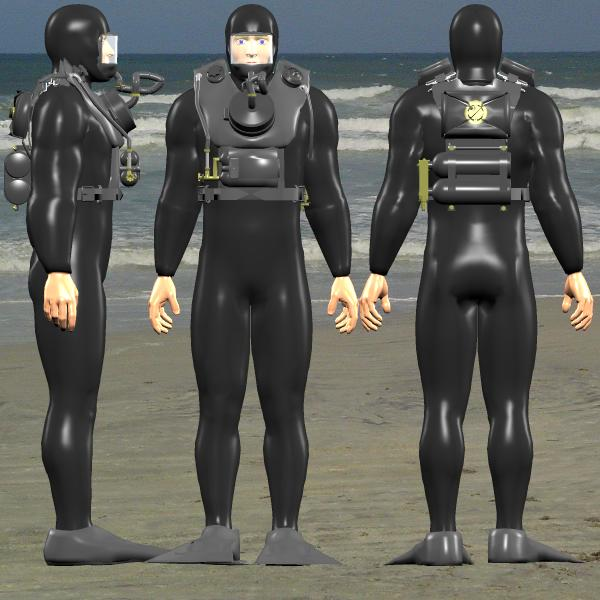
The Siebe Gorman CDBA from three angles

The Clearance Divers Breathing Apparatus (CDBA) is a type of rebreather made by Siebe Gorman in England.

The British Royal Navy used it for many years. It was for underwater work rather than for combat diving. The main oxygen cylinders are on the diver's back. The oxygen cylinders at the front of the diver are for bailout. In its basic mode it was an oxygen rebreather; but some of the cylinders could be replaced by diluent cylinders for nitrox mode (which the Navy called "mixture"), and then the set was sometimes called CDMBA. The Royal Navy was using nitrox from 1944, but did not reveal its nitrox techniques, and in the 1960s and afterwards civilian divers had to retread the same ground and develop nitrox diving independently. In later years it was called DSSCCD from "Diving Set, Self-Contained, Clearance Diver".

== Design ==
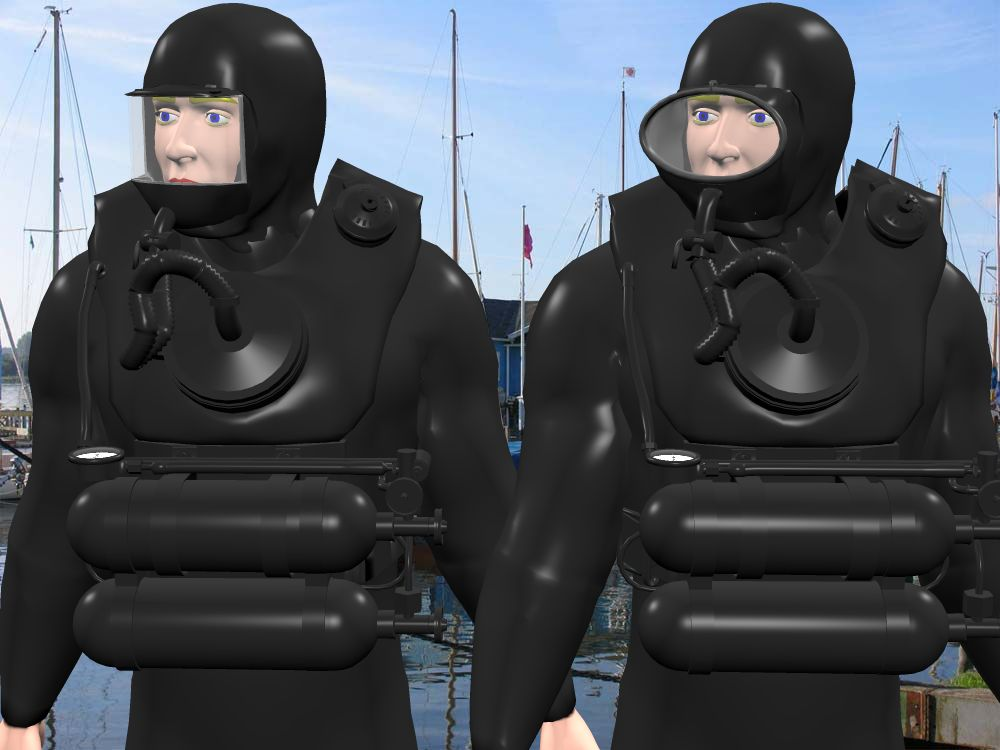
2 types of fullface mask used with the CDBA and UBA and SCBA; the oval type is older.

The CDBA was very popular with the clearance divers. It is comfortable since there is no cylinder on the middle of the back, no bulky buoyancy compensator, and it requires very little weight.

As the rebreather has a single "pendulum" breathing tube, the diver must breathe deeply to avoid carbon dioxide build-up. The counterlung is eight litres. As with all rebreathers, the diver should breathe continuously to keep the gas flowing over the absorbent. Dives on the unit are limited to 90 minutes.

Instead of a weight belt there is a weight pouch at the back, full of lead ball weights 38 mm (1.5 in) in diameter. In an emergency, the diver could pull a line which opened the weight pouch to jettison these weights.

It is intended to be used with a fullface mask with one breathing tube. At first (during World War II and after) a mask with an oval or circular flat window (as seen in images at this link) was used; later the mask with the newer type of rectangular window mostly flat but folded back at the sides was used.

== Modes of setting up the CDBA ==
The front cylinders were intended as a bailout; the main cylinders are on the back.

For a short dive the set could be used without the back cylinders, using only the front cylinders; this made the set very light and compact and suitable for getting through small holes. Even with the back cylinders the diver is much more compact and streamlined and agile than most recreational open circuit scuba.

The front and the back of the harness can unclip from each other at the shoulders. There is no automatic gas control: so safe use of the set relied entirely on training.

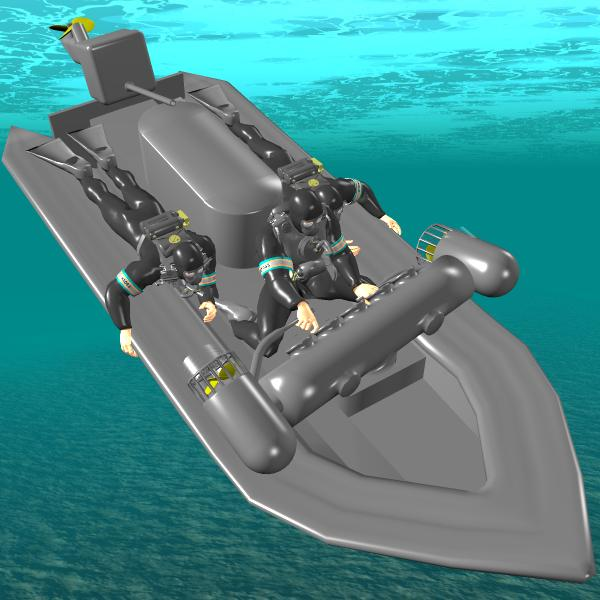
Computer-generated image of three frogmen riding a Subskimmer underwater. Their breathing sets are the Siebe Gorman CDBA.

== Other similar rebreathers ==
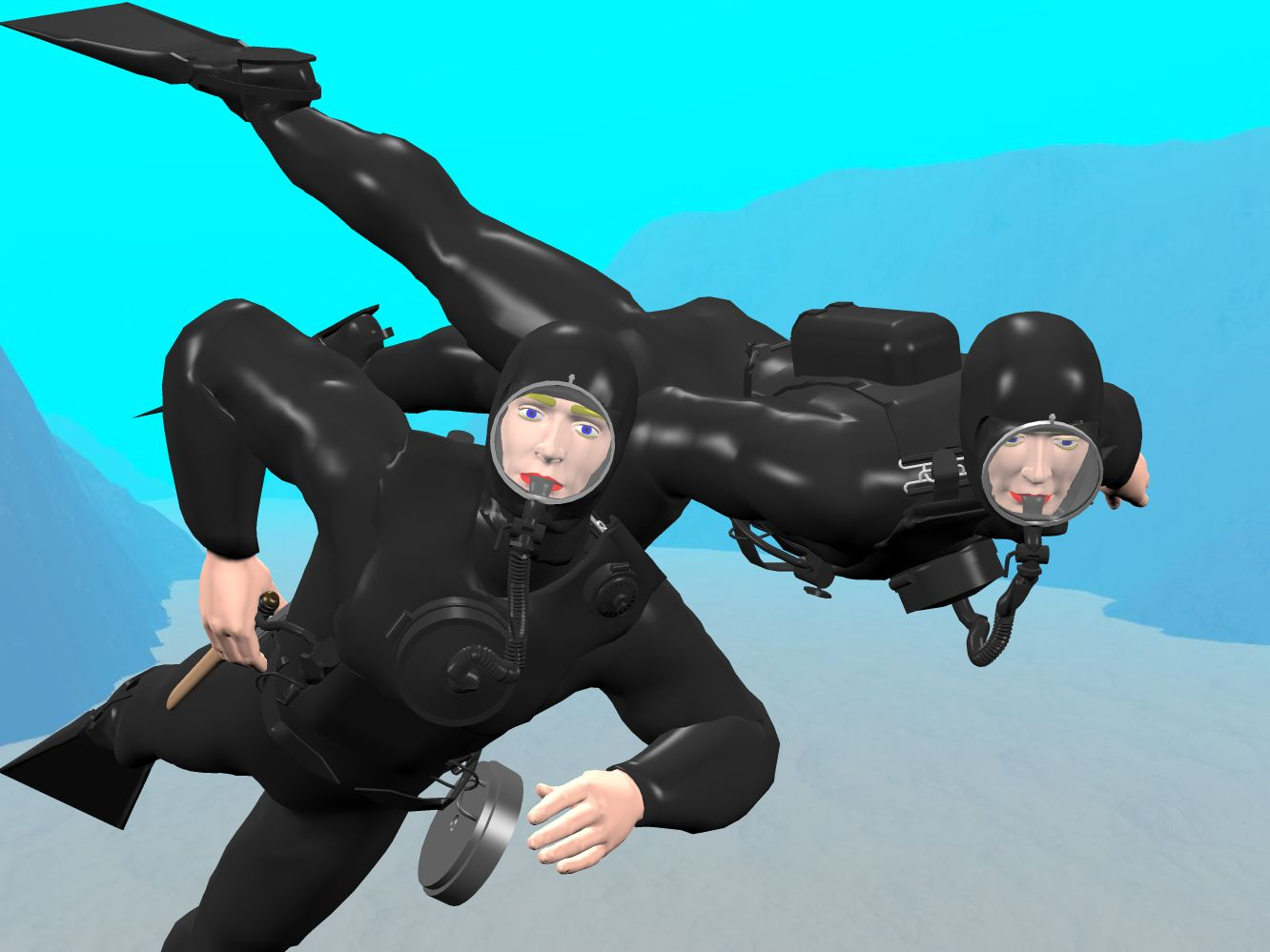
2 frogmen with Siebe Gorman SCBA (or similar) 1950s-type rebreathers

British "frogman's" sets used the same shape of counterlung as the CDBA but different cylinders. One type was the "Swimmer Canoeists Breathing Apparatus" (SCBA), which had oxygen cylinders on the back, vertically for better streamlining in swimming, the oxygen connections thinner, and no cylinders on the front, leaving the diver's lower front uncluttered for climbing in and out of small boats. The SCBA gave 90 minutes dive duration with no reserve. In mixture (nitrox or heliox) mode it was called SCMBA. An old photograph seems to show the cylinders (and perhaps also the weights) in a tied or laced canvas casing rather than held on with metal clamps, and a rectangular fullface mask as with the CDBA. There is a British armed forces manual about the SCBA, dated 1984 as if the SCBA was still in use then, showing separate eyes-and-nose mask and strapped-in mouthpiece and no canvas pouch, and separate sport-type weight belt with buckle-shaped weights all at the back. The design of the Swimmer Canoeists Breathing Apparatus likely changed down the years.

The LOSE (Lightweight Oxygen Swimmers Equipment), a diving rebreather formerly made by Siebe Gorman, was similar to a Swimmer Canoeist's Breathing Apparatus including the cylinder backpack.

Other British frogmen's sets had no back cylinders and one or more big cylinders across the belly: one of these modes was the UBA (Underwater Breathing Apparatus).

=== Other meanings of those initials ===
- The letters "SCBA" had two other meanings connected to breathing sets:
  - Submerged Chamber Breathing Apparatus (formerly used to aerate submerged air-chambers).
  - Self Contained Breathing Apparatus (its modern meaning, it means industrial breathing sets (usually open-circuit) for use on land)

For other uses of the letters "UBA" see UBA.

== See also ==
- Rebreather – Portable apparatus to recycle breathing gas
