= Loose (surname) =

Loose is a surname. Notable people with the surname include:

- Christian Loose (born 1975), German politician
- Emmy Loose (1914–1987), Austrian opera singer
- Jacob Loose (1850–1923), American businessman
- Julian Loose (born 1985), German footballer
- Ralf Loose (born 1963), German footballer and manager
- Thomas Loose (born 1964), West-German slalom canoeist
- William Loose (1910–1991), American composer
