= Hubert Looser =

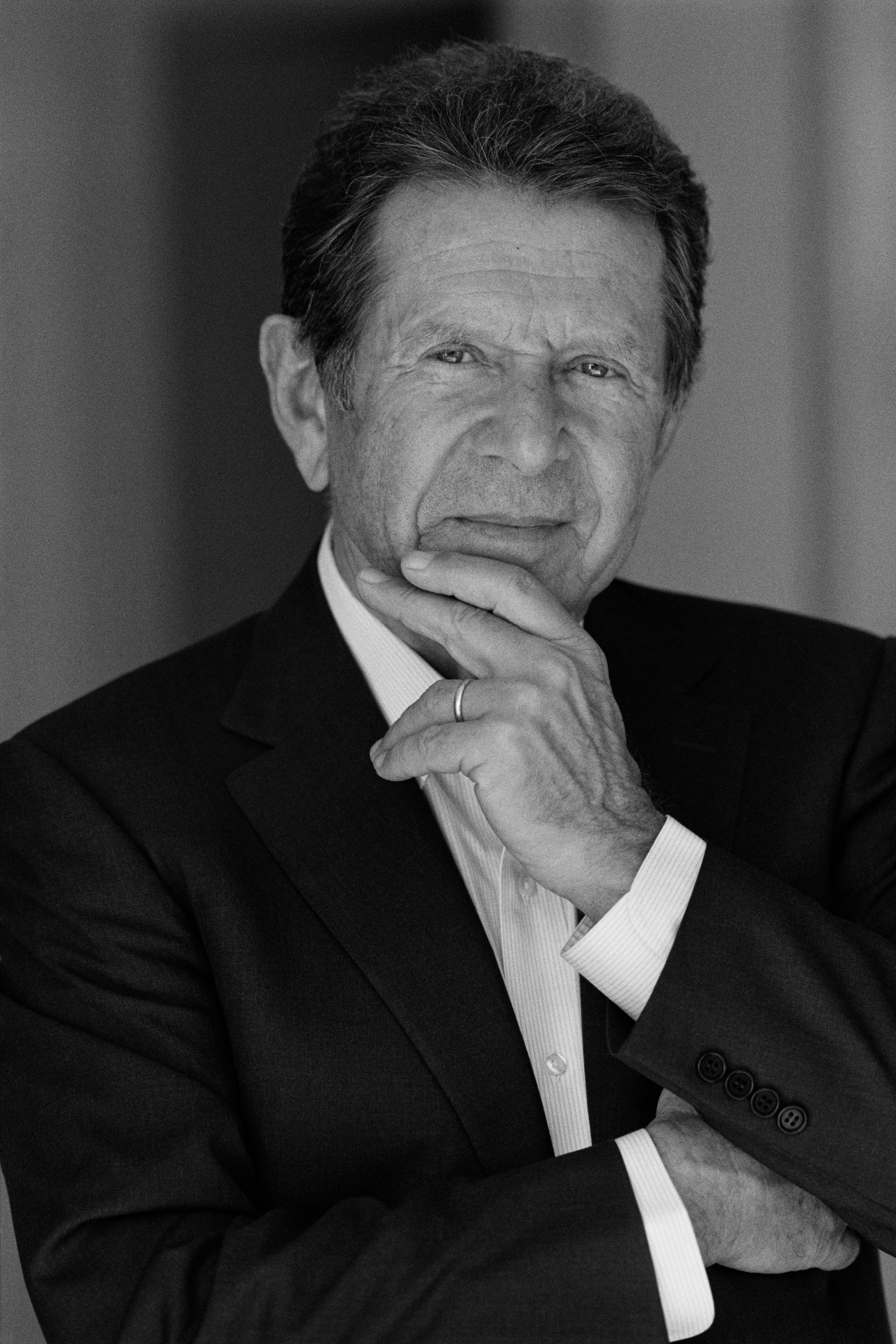
- Born: 5 April 1938 (age 87); Vilters, Switzerland
- Education: Columbia University (MBA)
- Occupation(s): Swiss businessman, philanthropist and art collector

Hubert Looser (born 5 April 1938) is a former Swiss businessman, philanthropist and art collector. Looser was President of Walter Rentsch Holding AG and ELCO Looser Holding AG. Today Looser is active as a member of the board of the Hubert Looser Foundation.

== Life ==
Looser was born on 5 April 1938 in Vilters, Switzerland, where he also grew up and attended school. He was the sixth born of seven children. His parents were entrepreneurs and had built the company ELCO. After Looser had earned his MBA from Columbia University New York, he joined his parents company in 1964 and was responsible for the establishment and leadership of the ELCO Group in France, Belgium and Luxembourg until 1980.

During this time, the founding of Remaco AG for business mediation and the takeover of Walter Rentsch AG in the field of office technology took place. In 1973, Looser took over the management of Walter Rentsch AG with 120 employees, which at his resignation in 1992, consisted of 1,200 employees. 1990/92 Looser resigned as president of the corporate groups Walter Rentsch AG and ELCO Looser Holding AG.

After selling his company shares, Hubert Looser became increasingly involved in the Fondation Hubert Looser, which he co-founded in 1988 and in which he still serves as president and financially supports his fortune with around 40 worldwide aid projects. Among other things, came the realization of projects for people with disabilities and children in need, as well as training support for young people in countries such as Cambodia, Albania and Romania or AIDS projects in South Africa, Zimbabwe and Nigeria.

Looser is married with Ursula Looser Stingelin, a father of two children from a previous marriage and lives in Zürich.

== Art collection ==
During his stay in Paris in 1957 to learn the language, posters from an Impressionist exhibition made a big impression on him and he went to museums around the world whenever he had the time. In his twenties, Looser completed various study trips during his training period to Mexico, Japan, Paris, London or New York and laid the foundation of his passion for collecting art. However, his collections first 200 works were mostly Swiss art. Today, Hubert Looser, is considered to be an outstanding private art collector in the Swiss area. His collections main focus is on works of surrealism, Abstract expressionism and minimalism. One of Willem de Kooning's largest collections outside of the US is as part of the collection. The museum-suitable works of the collection were introduced in 2008 to the Fondation Hubert Looser, which makes this cultural asset available to the public as a permanent exhibition at the Kunsthaus Zürich. On 9 October 2021, some pieces from Looser's collection, including works by Cy Twombly, Jackson Pollock, Ellsworth Kelly, and Agnes Martin, were moved into the new annex of the Kunsthaus Zürich.

== Awards ==
In 2018, Looser was awarded the Montblanc Arts Patronage Award.
