= Of Course You Are =

Studio album by Robert Pollard
- Released: March 4, 2016
- Label: Fire America (US); Fire (UK)

Robert Pollard chronology
Faulty Superheroes (2015)	Of Course You Are (2016)	Our Gaze (2022)

Professional ratings
Aggregate scores
Source	Rating
Metacritic	78/100
Review scores
Source	Rating
AllMusic	3.5/5 stars

Of Course You Are is the 22nd studio album by singer-songwriter Robert Pollard. It was released March 4, 2016, on Fire Records. The album was produced by Ricked Wicky member Nick Mitchell.

== Track listing ==
1. "My Daughter Yes She Knows"
2. "Long Live Instant Pandemonium"
3. "Come And Listen"
4. "Little Pigs"
5. "Promo Brunette"
6. "I Can Illustrate"
7. "The Hand That Holds You"
8. "Collision Daycare"
9. "That's The Way You Gave It To Me"
10. "Contemporary Man (He Is Our Age)"
11. "Losing It"
12. "Of Course You Are"
