= John Cahill (businessman) =

British business executive (1930–1995)

- Born: John Conway Cahill; 8 January 1930; Ruislip, Middlesex, United Kingdom
- Died: 4 November 1995 (aged 65); Rhode Island, United States
- Occupations: Business executive; company director; industrialist
- Spouse: Giovanna Lenardon (m. 1956)
- Children: 3 daughters

John Conway Cahill (8 January 1930 – 4 November 1995) was a British businessman, and the former Chief Executive of British Aerospace and BTR plc. He sold Rover Group to BMW in 1994.

== Early life ==
He was born in Ruislip in Middlesex, United Kingdom. He had a sister. His Irish Catholic father was one of the founders of Blue Circle Industries. He was sent to boarding school at the age of nine. He did not like his experience at boarding school. He left school at the age of 16.

== Career ==
He worked 12 hours a day, seven days a week and did not like holidays.

=== BTR ===
Cahill rose to become CEO of BTR in 1987, where he led a three-year period of sales growth. BTR was acquisitive in this period of time under Sir Owen Green’s and Alan Jackson’s leadership.

=== British Aerospace ===
He became Executive Chairman of British Aerospace on 23 May 1992. He rescued BAe from the brink of bankruptcy. In September 1992 the company wrote off £1bn, to restructure the company. In January 1993 the company received a much welcome order for £3bn for the Panavia Tornado ADV. He sold the Rover Group to BMW in January 1994 for £800m. At the time of being Executive Chairman, he was living in the USA. He resigned on 26 April 1994. BAe was employing around 116,000 people at the time. He was paid £450,000. He was obsessively punctual. He was given a £3.2m pay-off, a

=== TWA ===
He became Chairman of TWA on 9 June 1995.

== Personal life ==
He married an Italian woman named Giovanna Lenardon in 1956 and had three daughters together. He died in Rhode Island of cancer in 1995.

Business positions
Preceded by	Chairman of Trans World Airlines (TWA); June 1995 – November 1995	Succeeded by
Preceded by Sir Norman Ireland	Chief Executive Officer of BTR plc 1987 – 1990	Succeeded by Alan Jackson
Preceded by	Executive Chairman of British Aerospace; May 1992 – April 1994	Succeeded by
