= Norman Ireland (businessman) =

British businessman (1927–2011)

Sir Norman Ireland FCA FCMI
- Born: Norman Charles Ireland; 28 May 1927; Aden, Aden Protectorate
- Died: 5 October 2011 (aged 84)
- Occupations: Businessman; accountant
- Spouse: Lady Gillian Harrison (m. 1953)

Sir Norman Charles Ireland FCA FCMI (28 May 1927 – 5 October 2011) was a British businessman who was Chief Executive and later Chairman of British conglomerate, BTR plc.

Ireland was born in the Aden Protectorate in 1927 but soon left to study in the British Raj and finally the United Kingdom. From there, he became qualified as an accountant and in doing so, became a financial adviser to the British, Avon Rubber Company from 1954 to 1967.

It was in his later life that he joined BTR plc. In this time, he was the financial controller from 1967 until the 1980s, where Sir Owen Green promoted him to become the chief executive in 1984. Ireland later replaced Green in 1993 to become Chairman of the entire conglomerate during the rapid growth period led by his chief executive, Alan Jackson.

Ireland retired after leaving the position of Chairman of BTR in 1995. He died on 5 October 2011, at the age of 84.

Business positions
Preceded by Sir Owen Green	Chairman of BTR PLC; 1993 – 1995	Succeeded by Elwyn Eilledge
Preceded by Sir Owen Green	Chief Executive Officer of BTR PLC; 1984 – 1987	Succeeded by John Cahill
