= Anti-Franchise League =

Women's Anti-Franchise League of Victoria
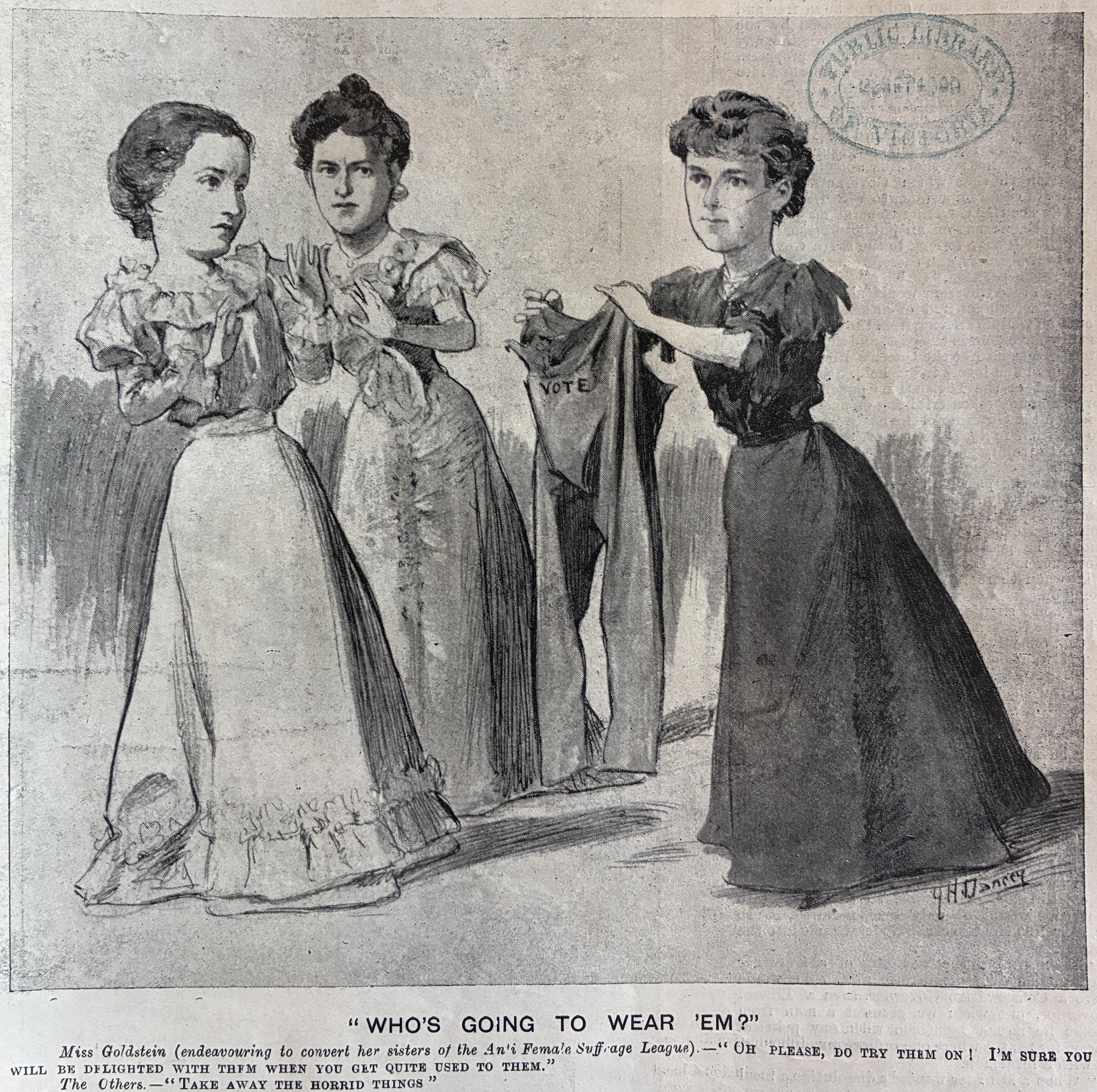
- Cartoon of the Anti-suffrage league and Vida Goldstein in Melbourne Punch from 1900
- Formation: July 1900
- Founders: Carrie Reid and Freda Derham
- Dissolved: c. November/December 1900
- Purpose: Anti-women's suffrage campaigning in Victoria
- Location: Victoria, Australia

The Woman's Anti-Franchise League of Victoria, also known as the Woman's Anti-Suffrage League of Victoria, was an Australian organisation opposed to women's suffrage in Victoria. It was founded in July 1900 by Carrie M. Reid and Freda Derham in response to a women's suffrage Bill being heard in the Parliament of Victoria. They organised an anti-suffrage petition which was signed by 22,978 women and presented to the Victorian Legislative Council in September 1900. The suffrage Bill failed.

The women involved in the group were reluctant to go further than organising the petition, as public campaigning and debating was outside of their concept of a woman's sphere, which was based in the home. The Anti-Franchise League subsequently disbanded. However, in the years after the group disbanded, at the request of Frederick Derham who was Derham's father, Janet, Lady Clarke mobilised the signatories of the anti-suffrage petition to form the Australian Women's National League.

== Activity ==
=== Formation ===
The Anti-Franchise League was co-founded by Carrie M. Reid, and Freda Derham. In July 1900 they wrote a letter to the Argus stating that they did not wish to have the vote. They started collecting signatures for a petition which they would present to the Victorian Legislative Council in September, when the council was due to have a sitting for a Women's Suffrage bill. A letter titled 'The Women's Suffrage Bill - A woman's protest' was posted in Victorian newspapers, seeking anti-suffrage signatures. The letter argued that while the Monster Petition presented to parliament in 1891, had nearly 30,000 signatures of women who wish to have the vote, it was unclear how many women chose not to sign and did not want to have the vote. Reid and Derham referred to themselves as 'Victoria's girls', and suggested that as a younger generation of women than those who organised the 1891 petition, (when it was collated, Reid was 15, and Derham 12), they had fresher ideas that were more in-step with most of the population.

After an initial meeting on 23 July 1900, a second meeting was held on 3 August, at which a good attendance was reported. However, the women who were present did not wish to step up to lead the proceedings. Instead, they deferred to the men present, which included several members of the Legislative Council and Assembly, including both Reid and Derham's fathers who were conservative members of the Victorian Legislative Assembly. Reid was the daughter of Robert Reid, who was known to oppose the reform of women's suffrage, which was debated in Australia at the time. Derham was the daughter of Frederick Derham. Colonel Jacob Goldstein was also present and was invited to chair the meeting. Goldstein was the father of Vida Goldstein, and the husband of Isabella Goldstein, both prominent suffragists campaigning for the vote. Goldstein's public involvement in the anti-suffrage movement was the last straw for his already strained relationship with Isabella, and they began living separately. Reid and Derham were appointed joint secretaries of the Anti-Franchise League and Goldstein was appointed organising secretary. Other possible participants at the meeting were Arthur Sachse MLC, Nathaniel Levi MLC, Malcolm McKenzie MLA, Montague Cohen, Edith Bruce, and Richard Hale Budd. In his opening speech Goldstein praised Reid and Derham for their work, but stated there was no real organisation. Coady points out that this was not accurate, as the August gathering was also told that 6000-7000 signatures had already been collected, and 1000 copies of the petition were still in circulation. The meeting passed two motions refuting women's suffrage. Firstly, they stated it would be against nature and God saying:

"Women were constituted by God to be the queen of the affections of the heart and the empress of the household and any artificial means adopted by Parliament to alter the state of things were contrary to the law of nature and the law of God, and must necessarily result in injury and degradation to women."

And secondly, as the 1891 suffrage petition had only 30,000 signatures which was just eleven per cent of the women in Victoria, it was a minority statement, and should not be considered as a representation of majority views.

=== Response from suffragists ===
Vida Goldstein challenged Reid and Derham to public debates, but they declined stating they were not organised to do so, they were only focussed on the petition. The Argus stated they were choosing not to enter into debate because it was outside of their concept of the 'woman's sphere'. The Age responded that by collecting signatures they were already in the public sphere, and by seeking signatures were encouraging women 'to do the very thing which they tell them they are incapable of doing.'

=== The Anti-Suffrage Petition ===
The petition that the group presented to parliament on 16 September 1900 contained 22,978 signatures. The signature canvassers were accused of using disingenuous methods to gain signatures. They asked questions such as: 'Are you in favour of all the bad women of Melbourne getting into parliament?' and 'Do you want women to neglect their homes and become members of parliament?'. There were reports that factory employers were pressuring women employees to sign. However, Coady stated that the signatures were attributed to many addresses from all around Victoria, and points out that there would have been more outrage if there were any large scale subterfuge. Furthermore, these opinions would have been held by many women of the era. However, Coady also states that it has been suggested that Reid and Derham may have organised the petition in collaboration with Robert Walpole, who would later become an organising secretary of the Victorian Employer's Federation, who had already established connections from his experience canvassing the state in relation to Federation. This is plausible considering his connection with both of their fathers.

The day the petition was presented to the Victorian Legislative Council, and they subsequently voted against the suffrage bill, Jacob Goldstein and Vida Goldstein watched on from the Visitor's Gallery, sitting side by side. After the bill was defeated, the Anti-Franchise League refused to engage in debate with the suffragists, and the organisation disappeared entirely in the following months.

Annie Watson Lister, representing the National Council of Women of Victoria, gave a speech to the 36th Annual Convention of the National American Women Suffrage Association in Washington, D.C. in February 1904. She spoke about the Anti-suffrage league, stating:

"Our Anti-suffrage Association died three months after it was born. It was formed by two of our leading manufacturers, who hid behind their daughters. They had plenty of money, took a large office in a main street, employed several paid secretaries, and spent more in three months than we had done in all our years of work. They paid little boys and girls to circulate their petition and got many signatures under false pretenses. ... Much was made of their petition through it was not half as large as ours. The daughters of these manufacturers drove up in their carriages to their fathers' factories at the lunch hour and made the working girls sign their petition."

== Legacy ==
The anti-suffrage petition, like all petitions at the time, is a roll of connected pages of signatures attached to the words of the petition. The roll measures at least 350mm in diameter. It is held at the Public Record Office Victoria, and can only be viewed with permission from the Secretary to the Legislative Council.

Australia introduced women's suffrage in 1901, but the Victorian Parliament would not pass state voting rights for women until 1908. At celebrations after the 1908 state legislation was passed, Vida Goldstein downplayed the efficacy of the league stating that 'there is no better aid to Women's Suffrage than an anti-suffrage league'.

A few years after the petition, in 1903, Frederick Derham requested that Janet, Lady Clarke gather the women who signed the anti-suffrage petition to speak about forming a group that could organise against socialism and women's suffrage. As a result a group met in September 1903 at Clarke's home in East Melbourne. After this meeting, a larger group met in April 1904, and the result was the formation of the Australian Women's National League, with Clarke appointed president.
