= M42 =

M42 or M-42 may refer to:

In science:

- Messier 42, a nebula also called the Orion Nebula
- the 42nd Mersenne prime, 2^{25964951}-1, discovered in 2005
- an Y-chromosomal mutation, see Haplogroup B-M42

In transportation:

- M42 motorway, a motorway in the United Kingdom
- M-42 (Michigan highway), a state highway in Michigan
- M42 (Cape Town), a Metropolitan Route in Cape Town, South Africa
- M42 (Pretoria), a Metropolitan Route in Pretoria, South Africa
- M42 (New York City bus), a New York City Bus route in Manhattan
- BMW M42, a 1989 automobile piston engine
- Dodge M42, ¾-ton command truck, 1950s
- M42 (sub-basement), a power station at New York City's Grand Central Terminal

In photography:

- M42 lens mount, a standard for cameras

In firearms and military equipment:

- Ag m/42, a Swedish semi-automatic rifle which saw limited use by the Swedish Army from 1942 until the 1960s
- M42 Duster, a United States Army self-propelled anti-aircraft gun
- M42 (gas mask), a United States military gas mask
- M/42 (bicycle), a Swedish military bicycle
- 45 mm anti-tank gun M1942 (M-42), a Soviet anti-tank gun (Motovilikha Plants)
- Duperite M42 helmet, an Australian WWII helmet
- M42 Stahlhelm, a type of German WWII helmet
- M42, a Smith & Wesson hammerless revolver
- M42 United Defense submachine gun, an American weapon used in World War II
- M42 command truck

In manufacturing:

- M42 is the Unified numbering system code ("miscellaneous nonferrous metals and alloys") for a grade of high-speed steel with cobalt

== See also ==
- M1942 (disambiguation)
- M242 Bushmaster
