= William Ferris =

William Ferris may refer to:

- William H. Ferris (1874–1941), African American journalist and author
- William R. Ferris (born 1942), folklorist and scholar of the U.S. South, former chair of the National Endowment for the Humanities
- William Ferris (politician) (1855–1917), Australian politician
- Bill Ferris (born 1942), Australian philanthropist and entrepreneur
