= Margaret Jackson (executive) =

Australian corporate executive (born 1953)

Margaret Jackson AC FCA FAICD
- Born: Margaret Anne Jackson; 17 March 1953 (age 73); Warragul, Victoria, Australia
- Education: Warragul High School
- Alma mater: Monash University; University of Melbourne
- Occupation: Corporate executive
- Relatives: Alan Jackson (uncle); Joseph Jackson

Margaret Anne Jackson (born 17 March 1953) is an Australian corporate executive. She was the first Chairwoman of Qantas Airways from 2000 to 2007 amongst other company and charitable directorships.

== Early life and education ==
Jackson was born in Warragul, Victoria, and studied at Warragul High School. She graduated with a Bachelor of Economics (BEc) degree from Monash University in 1973 and a Master of Business Administration (MBA) from the University of Melbourne.

== Career ==
=== Early career ===
Jackson began her career as an accountant and later partner in various accounting firms. She began work for BDO Nelson PArkhill in 1977 but soon became a partner at KPMG and later Pricewaterhouse (now PricewaterhouseCoopers) in the 1980s. In that time, Jackson would become a chartered accountant and fellow of the Institute of Chartered Accountants in Australia (FCA) and also a fellow of the Australian Institute of Company Directors (FAICD).

In 1983, Jackson became the second woman to sit on the board of Telecom (now Telstra). She would become a director of the Australian Wool Corporation and later chairman of the Transport Accident Commission (TAC) in Victoria from 1993 to 2001. Jackson was also a director of the ANZ from 1994 as well as a director of Billabong from 2000 to 2011. She would continue much of her work as a director on various boards including St Vincent's Hospital, Pacific Dunlop, the Fairfax Media and the Australian War Memorial, to name a few.

Jackson left accounting in 1992 after she became a director on the Qantas board. She was also the first woman to become chairman of a top-50 publicly listed company in Australia when Jackson became chair of Qantas in 2000.

=== Qantas takeover bid ===
In early May 2007, Jackson faced mounting pressure to resign from the board of Qantas after the dramatic last-minute failure of the Qantas takeover bid by Airline Partners Australia. After the bid failed, she faced criticism that she had undervalued the airline, was reluctant to release upgraded profit forecasts and did not act in the best interests of the majority of shareholders. Jackson was one of the most outspoken supporters of the takeover bid and, when asked of the ramifications of the bid failing, she famously stated, "If anyone thinks this will happen without affecting the (share) price then they have a mental problem with how the market works." This was interpreted by some observers as an insult to shareholders and evidence that Jackson was actively lobbying for the takeover consortium.

On 17 May 2007, Jackson informed the Qantas board that she would "retire from the board when her term ends at this year's AGM", due to be held in November of that year. The board put its support behind Jackson's decision to stay on until then because it ensured "continuity and stability" was maintained in the company.

John Howard, then the Australian prime minister, described Jackson's retirement decision as "a matter for her" and made no direct comment, but expressed his support and confidence in her. Following the collapse of the Qantas sale bid, a number of highly respected businesspeople and personalities spoke out in support of Jackson, including Sir Rod Eddington (former chief executive officer of British Airways) and former Victorian premier Jeff Kennett.

As Qantas's business performance has deteriorated, and with it the company's stock price, opinions on Jackson and her support of the sale bid have shifted. By May 2008, the share price had fallen by over 40 per cent since the takeover period with the bid price sitting at a 33-per-cent premium. Many media commentators such as Jennifer Hewett have suggested Jackson had been correct in her assertions that the takeover offer was a good deal for shareholders. The increasing difficulties surrounding Qantas seen in 2013 and 2014 led to further public comments by commentators in support of Jackson's actions and comments surrounding the proposed Qantas sale – "Meanwhile, former Qantas chair Margaret Jackson will no doubt muse on that $5.40 a share offer which was rejected just before the GFC. She was right, anyone who didn't accept was mad."

== Honours and awards ==
Jackson was inducted onto the Victorian Honour Roll of Women in 2001. On 5 December 2002, she was granted an honorary doctorate of laws (HonLLD) from Monash University.

In the 2003 Queen's Birthday Honours, Jackson was honoured with the Companion of the Order of Australia (AC) “for service to business in diverse and leading Australian corporations and to the community in the area of support for medical research, the arts and education”.

Business positions
Preceded by Gary Pemberton	Chairperson of Qantas; 2000–2007	Succeeded by Leigh Clifford
