= Austrade =

Australian government organisation

Australian Trade and Investment Commission
Statutory agency overview
- Formed: 1986
- Jurisdiction: Commonwealth of Australia
- Employees: 565
- Annual budget: A$200 million (2012)
- Statutory agency executive: Dr Paul Grimes, Chief Executive Officer
- Website: www.austrade.gov.au

The Australian Trade and Investment Commission, or Austrade (/ˈɒzˌtreɪd/ OZ-trayd), is the Australian Government's trade, investment and education promotion agency which was also given responsibility for tourism policy, programs and research from 2013. Austrade was established under the Australian Trade Commission Act 1985. It is a non-corporate Commonwealth entity under the Public Governance, Performance and Accountability Act 2013, and a statutory agency under the Public Service Act 1999. Austrade is part of the Foreign Affairs and Trade portfolio.

Under Austrade's corporate structure, its chief executive officer is accountable to the Federal Minister for Tourism, Trade and Investment. Dr Paul Grimes was appointed chief executive officer of Austrade in March 2025.

== Global network ==
Through a global network of offices, Austrade aims to assist Australian companies to connect with buyers in offshore markets, attract foreign direct investment into Australia, and promote Australia's education sector internationally.

In Australia, Austrade's services and programs are delivered through a national network of offices and TradeStart locations in metropolitan and regional areas, operating in partnership with Australian state and territory governments, industry associations and regional development bodies.

== Historical overview ==
Austrade was established in 1986 initially tasked with coordinating and facilitating the country's export promotion schemes (Fletcher, as cited in Chung and Mascitelli, 2017, p. 417). Since then, it lies at the forefront of both Australia's bilateral and multilateral trade agreements and is also tasked with organising policies on imports. This extended role since its establishment has increased the international competitiveness of Australian businesses post globalisation, a vision arranged by John Dawkins, former Trade Minister under the Hawke government. Austrade has allowed for countries to be economically integrated more than ever and is described as one of the most ambitious changes on the government trade promotion landscape since the creation of the Trade Commissioner Service in 1933 (Nicholls, as cited in Chung and Mascitelli, 2017, p. 417). There are four separate government entities under the original export promotion scheme, including a segment of the Department of Trade, Trade Commissioner Service, Export Finance Insurance Corporation and the Export Market Development Grant scheme (Dawkins, as cited in Chung and Mascitelli, 2017, p. 417). Dawkins was a key proponent for focusing on markets that needed assistance and has stressed the importance of directing attention to sunrise industries in order to help them compete on a global scale. According to Ferris in Chung and Mascitelli (2017), under these goals; the Australian economy and many around the world have naturally shifted their dependence on agriculture and slowly transitioned to manufacturing, following a similar journey to China's economic breakthrough.

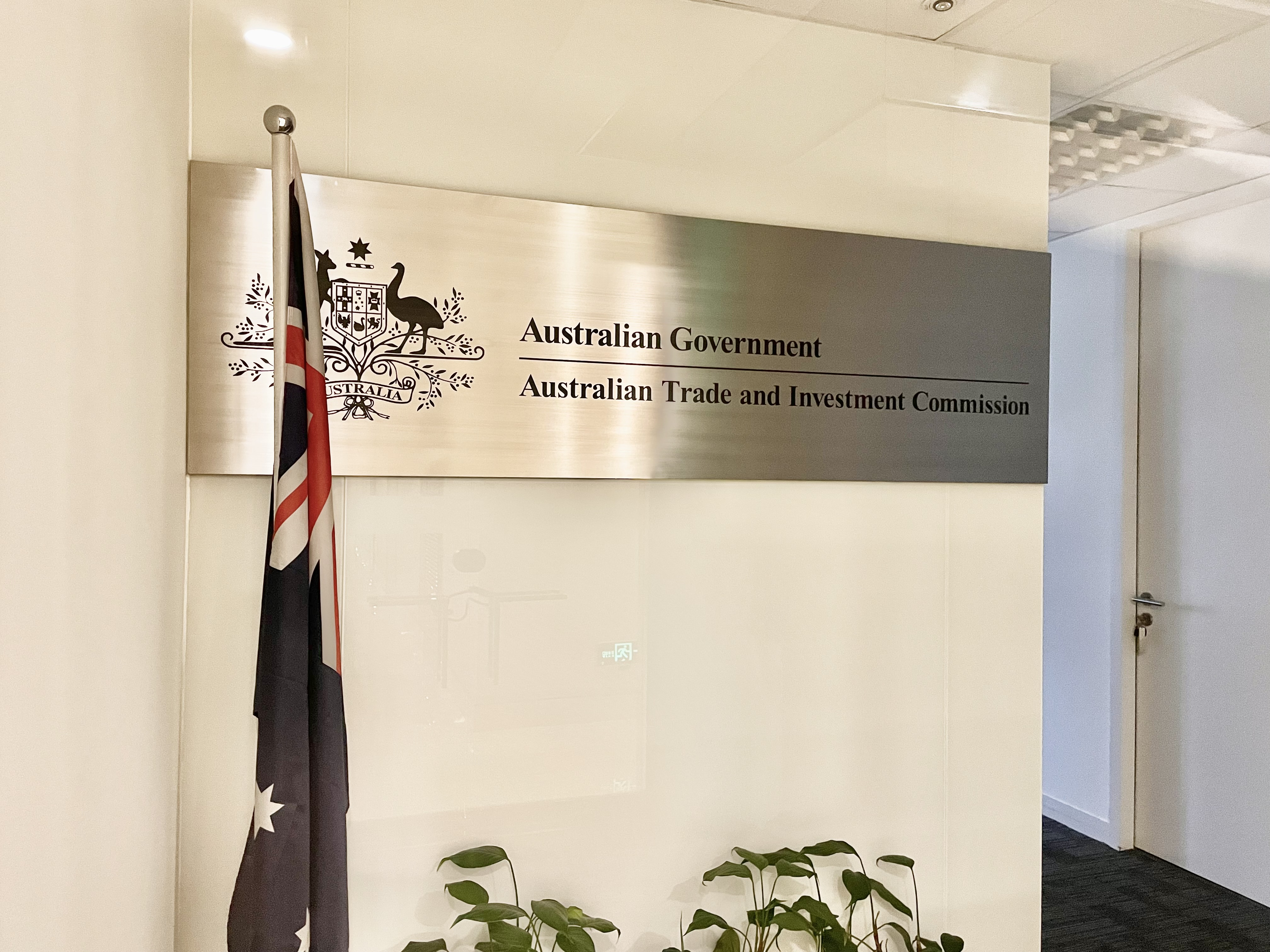
Australian Trade and Investment Commission (Austrade) office in Wuhan, China

Former managing director of Austrade Charles Jamieson initiated Emissaries of trade: a history of the Australian trade commissioner service in 2001. The objective of this independent research report was to develop a single consolidated history of the evolution of Austrade. Austrade played a role in the production of Emissaries of trade and it was eventually published under the auspices of the Department of Foreign Affairs and Trade. Boris Schedvin, appointed lead researcher of the case study, states that Austrade has had a lengthy and complex history. His analysis begins from fundamental trade theory where it was common for state and colonial governments to appoint commercial agents and trade commissioners in hopes of resolving economic volatility.

The election of the Hawke government in 1983 meant an inevitable change in Australia's approach toward trade. The first structural change of both the trade commissioner service and the department of trade was a resource shift from the trade portfolio to create a new department. This specialisation resulted in the formation of a resources and energy sector led by former senator Peter Walsh and deputy prime minister Lionel Bowen. As the acting minister for trade, Bowen was tasked with his first economic portfolio and at the time he showed limited interest in growing the economy through trade policy. Instead, Bowen remained adamant that the political legitimacy of the department of trade was in fact in question. Jim Cairns who was the preceding minister echoed these same sentiments albeit to a much lesser extent. Bowen and many of his ministerial colleagues insisted that trade was only to fulfill the political and economic interests of the National Party. Schedvin admits that this belief has reason in a theoretical sense.

Other changes in leadership of the department of trade revolved around the position of secretary which later became available after Jim Scully retired in late 1983. Of the candidates, John Menadue filled the position as a member with an extensive knowledge of private industry and public service. This appointment was made before globalisation took the international stage and propelled nations to take part in bilateral and multilateral trade agreements. An important observation is that Menadue was an internationalist who showed a keen interest in Asian markets. Former ambassador to Japan in 1977, the time he spent there reinforced his calling for the Australian economy to open up. The timing of this although not coincidentally aligns with that of China (globally the largest Asian market) which implemented their renowned Open Door Policy in 1978 in hopes of attracting new investment ventures.

Menadue was confident that Australia "had an urban business culture that was addicted to protection. It had its back to the outside world and looked internally to the Australian market". He insisted that there was too much of a focus on the development and promotion of export markets for minerals and farm produce when there should be a focus on transitioning these respective industries or at the very minimum restructuring them. The restructuring would provide potential jobs for Australian's following the development and export of manufactured goods. This historical overview is closely related the transformation of China's economy to a heavy manufacturing based industry.

With tourism being a growing and significant export, in 2013 Austrade was given the responsibility for Commonwealth Government tourism policy and programs and the Tourism Research Australia organisation was also transferred to it.

== Vision ==
Following World War II, both Doug Anthony and John McEwen who were instrumental in Austrade's rapid growth saw an opportunity to target the issue of Australia's balance of payments as the forefront of broader objectives. Policy objectives were achieved whenever difficulties emerged and the result can be characterised as leakages in the economy being filled at a timely manner. The 1960s saw the establishment of a global network of offices. The original focus placed upon regulating instability within the balance of payments has shifted over time to boundaries beyond Austrade. The balance of payments is not to be confused with the fundamental objective of Austrade in stimulating the Australian economy through trade initiatives in the form of export programs. This sentiment was the main proponent that allowed for the expansion of the commission as a substitute for more flexible tariff and exchange rate policies. An overview of Austrade's broader vision has reveals concerns have arisen regarding what exactly role Austrade was supposedly created for. Charles Jameson, who was managing director at the time (1986) was mainly concerned that there was little to no background of the commission's history, especially when it came to preceding contemporary trade commissioners.

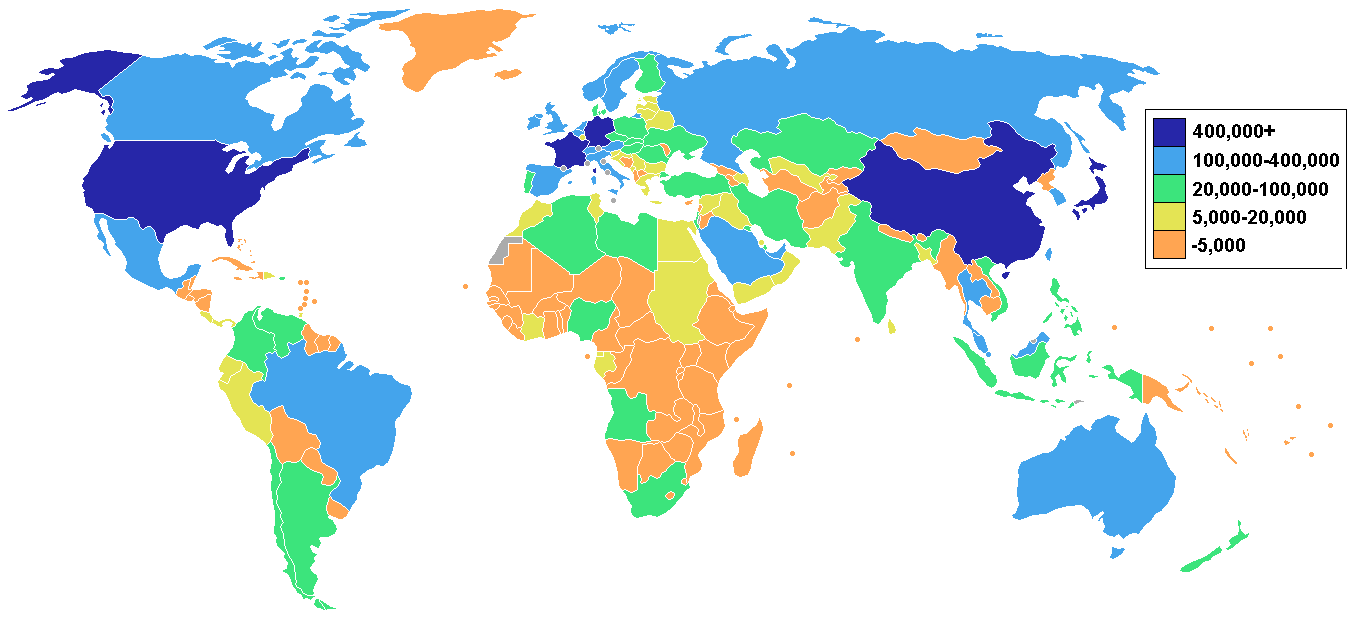
Global indicator of Australia's export performance and engagement in 2006 (number of exports)

Preceding Austrade's formation, economic prospects were under unprecedented scrutiny from high stagflation following the sharp recession from 1982 to 1983. Thus, it was founded with high expectations and backed by a dynamic and coordinated Trade Commissioner Service. In terms of its international impact, Austrade is held to an extremely high standard for the prospective economic growth it has garnered through opportunities; especially for a small nation such as Australia. Mascitelli (2015) writes that at the time of its establishment only 137 out of 1327 staff were Trade Commissioners, outlining the fact that it has become a blueprint for developing commissions under limited resources and personnel as well as being absent from a sprawling bureaucracy. Before Lindsay MacAlister (who was a former GE Australia Manager) was appointed as the managing director of Austrade, most of the employees that were in the main civil servants had limited or no business understanding. His appointment marked a significant change in the commission's culture. However, there have been difficulties in managing Austrade in that its "effectiveness depends on the closeness of the working relationship between government – basically the trade minister – and the organisation's leadership" (Adams, as cited in Chung and Mascitelli, 2017, p. 419). Schedvin (2008) references the environment within which the Trade Commissioner Service operated changing fundamentally and permanently in the 1970s as a sign of the inevitable shift that Austrade similarly experienced.

== Industry focus ==
Facilitating investment, particularly within industries of potential growth lies at the forefront of what Austrade is widely known for. An era of globalisation which has shifted many developing economies' primary industry (a notable example is China which transitioned from agriculture to manufacturing) has meant a focus on developing competitive industries is advised as a key growth model for any modern economy. Chung and Mascitelli highlight Austrade's unique and dynamic role in the Australian context due to its position of being a government agency that works alongside businesses with the aim of developing their international competitiveness. Historically, this relationship is considered rare due to the changing government policy stances regarding how much export orientated activity it should undergo.

The broader objective of Austrade is to enable service exporters to thrive in a volatile global economy. This often involves helping remove external barriers that prohibit international expansion and initiating long term trade agreements or exchange programs. There are many export sectors that Austrade pools its resources toward from mining to education. From a historical perspective, Downey (2005) details the process of nurturing Australia's export shares globally and highlights the barriers preventing entry. Access to global markets is reliant on a multitude of chained issues including reputation, financial risk including market volatility, short-term contracts, loss of intellectual property and limited opportunity. Among Australian firms, foreign direct investment (FDI) has evolved into an increasingly popular solution to bypass these restrictions. Preceding Downey's view on export expansion theories, O'Byrne (2002) goes into further detail about the "Exporting for the Future" initiative whereby he lists key indicators of Australia's growth:

- Exports account for about 20% of Australia's gross domestic product (GDP).
- 1 in every 5 Australian jobs depends on exports.
- 1 in every 4 jobs in rural and regional Australia relies on exports.
- Ninety six cents of every dollar of output from FDI stays in Australia.

These indicators remain relevant to Australia's continued reliance on their huge export base in sectors such as mining.

== Services ==
=== For Australian companies ===
Austrade provides advice to exporters on prospective markets and opportunities; on-the-ground support in target countries; trade exhibitions; and assistance in finding potential investors. No charge is made for general information which includes extensive online information, though fees may be required for specific tailored advice.

Austrade provides information and advice to assist Australian companies in exporting goods and services to markets including Asia, Africa, Latin America, the Middle East and Russia. For Australian exporters and education providers, Austrade has a comprehensive mix of information and customised services to assist doing business within overseas markets and to understand foreign regulations and business practices.

Historically, Austrade has concentrated most of its initiatives in North America, Western Europe and Japan due to the maturity of their economies. This has allowed for the Australian economy to engage in international trade through programs such as the Export Market Development Grants scheme, aimed at developing support for exporters by organising free trade agreements. Other initiatives include Australia International Education 2025 to bolster opportunities for international students to study abroad and the Tourism 2020 Implementation Plan which will help strengthen one of Australia's most important industries.

Eligible companies may apply for an Export Market Development Grant which provides funding for small to medium exporters for eligible promotional expenses.

A range of newsletters, webinars and in person events and activities are available to businesses with many strongly promoted via social media.

=== For international investors ===
Austrade is responsible for the promotion, attraction and facilitation of productive foreign direct investment (FDI) into Australia, and is the first national point of contact for all investment enquiries. Services to international companies are free, comprehensive and confidential. Working in partnership with Australian state and territory governments, Austrade provides international investors with information needed to establish or expand a business in Australia.

=== For international buyers ===
Austrade also assists international buyers to source goods and services from Australia or to identify strategic Australian business partners. Areas of development such as mining which has historically elevated Australia's economy continue to be a main policy objective for Austrade moving forward.

=== For Australian education providers ===
Austrade's role includes the international marketing and promotion of Australian education and training. Austrade co-ordinates and promotes the brand programs "Future Unlimited" which advertises Australian education and training institutions, and "Australia Unlimited" which promotes awareness of Australian skills and capabilities. It previously co-ordinated the "Building Brand Australia" program, a 4-year, A$20-million program to promote Australia's credentials as a "global citizen, global business partner and world class destination".

=== For tourism businesses ===
Austrade provides information, support and grants to tourism businesses. Austrade's Tourism Research Australia provides free statistics, information and insights and can provide specific tourism research and analysis on a fee-for-service basis.

== Initiatives with countries ==
Organising initiatives with other countries that share attuned roadmaps to growth has been necessary in expanding Austrade's global footprint. Landis (2012) explains Austrade's new streamlined structure following reforms due to the difficulty exporters faced accessing foreign markets. Introduced in 2011, Austrade has moved from regional to global management with oversight of its international network based in Sydney. Landis, a correspondent with offshore initiatives with regions such as Latin America and South Asia describes how an extensive review found that Austrade was too ambitious in priorities and did not direct engage enough with growth markets. Brewer (2010) says that Austrade's focus on tackling large economies led to the program employing "aspirational" targets that were not tangible within an organisation in the long run and that they were simply publicising unrealistic prospects. This overlocking of significant resources pooled into already established markets such as Europe and the US did more harm than good because exporters did not require Australia's help as much as sunrise industries in emerging markets. Similar to Landis, Piper (2012) outlines the obvious potential for trade and investment between Australia and Latin America. Austrade's efforts to engage with regions such as that of Latin America has been eased by an increasing number of companies realising how successful business could be conducted regionally. Within the framework of globalisation, Austrade has found unique expertise in assisting partner markets by providing contacts, market intelligence for individual jurisdictions and networks on the ground.

== Financial support for exporters ==
Austrade provides online information on export financing and other government financial assistance programs. It also administers the Export Market Development Grant (EMDG) Scheme, the Australian Government's financial assistance program for aspiring and current exporters, which encourages small and medium-sized Australian businesses to enter into and develop export markets. Under this scheme, eligible businesses are reimbursed for part of the export marketing costs they incur. The scheme supports a wide range of industry sectors and products, including inbound tourism and the export of intellectual property.

== Governing legislation and changes ==
Established under the Australian Trade Commission Act 1985, Austrade is a prescribed agency subject to the Financial Management and Accountability Act 1997 and the Public Service Act 1999. Austrade operates as a statutory authority within the portfolio of Foreign Affairs and Trade, its chief executive officer reporting directly to the Minister for Trade and Investment.

From its establishment until 30 June 2006, Austrade was governed by a board. As a result of a report by John Uhrig AC published in June 2003, the board was replaced from 1 July 2006 by a chief executive officer.

In 2011, changes were made to programs and services "to create a more contemporary and sustainable Austrade and to deliver greater value for the business community and for the Government".

On 23 March 2016, the Trade Legislation Amendment Act (No. 1) 2016 was passed, which amended various acts to facilitate the agency's name change from "Australian Trade Commission" to "Australian Trade and Investment Commission", with the governing act title also changed accordingly to "Australian Trade and Investment Commission Act 1985".

Schedvin provides further historical insight in his Emissaries of trade piece on how legislation has changed over time whereby the Commonwealth government initially took over the responsibility from independent agencies in the 1920s before Austrade's official enactment in 1985. However, broader criticism emerged from commercial interests which led to the experiment being discontinued as a result of the government's inapt legislation to provide a suitable legal framework. Approximately a decade onward, it was revived in an attempt to cure the 1930s depression which saw an unprecedented need for aggregate demand stimulation.

== Agency heads ==
Chairmen of the Australian Trade Commission
| Order | Chairman | Period | Reference |
|---|---|---|---|
| 1 | Bill Ferris AC^{1} | 1986–1993 | |
| 2 | Robert Johnston AO | 1993–1995 | |
| 3 | Roger Allen (acting) | 1995–1996 | |
| 4 | Alan Jackson AO | 1996–2001 | |
| 5 | Ross Adler AC^{2} | 2001–2006 | |

Managing directors / CEOs of Austrade
| Order | MDs / CEOs | Period | Reference |
|---|---|---|---|
| 1 | Ralph Evans AO | 1991–1996 | |
| 2 | Charles Jamieson AM | 1996–2002 | |
| 3 | Peter O'Byrne | 2002–2009 | |
| 4 | Peter Grey | 2010–2012 | |
| 5 | Bruce Gosper | 2013–2017 | |
| 6 | Stephanie Fahey | 2017–2020 | |
| 7 | Xavier Simonet | 2021–2024 | |
| 8 | Paul Grimes | 2025–Present | |

== Controversies ==
=== Firepower International ===
Between 2004 and 2006, Austrade reportedly granted special access privileges and funds totalling $394,009 to the fraudulent company Firepower International, which also provided employment to two former senior Austrade managers in Europe and Russia. The agency denied Firepower had received special treatment. However, perceived legitimation of Firepower's activities by Austrade undoubtedly helped promote tens of millions of dollars in fraudulent share sales to the Australian public "without proper disclosure documents in breach of the Corporations Act". Possibly because of the close involvement of senior diplomats and politicians, including then prime minister John Howard and senior minister Julie Bishop, in the scandal, Austrade did not initiate prosecutions against Tim Johnston and other Firepower principals, as it had previously done against relatively minor perceived offenders such as Western Australian town planner and inventor Paul Ritter, who was imprisoned in the late 1980s on charges of making inappropriate export-grant applications.

=== Securency ===
It has been alleged that Austrade officials knew about alleged bribes paid by officials from the Reserve Bank of Australia's Securency scandal. RBA subsidiaries were involved in bribing overseas officials so that Australia might win lucrative polymer note-printing contracts, and it has been alleged that Austrade officials knew of payments to a Vietnamese spy chief to secure contracts for printing banknotes.

== See also ==
- Australian economy
- Tourism in Australia
