= Peter Derham =

Australian business executive and director (1925–2008)

Sir Peter Derham AC KStJ
- Born: Peter John Derham; 21 August 1925; Melbourne, Australia
- Died: 24 September 2008 (aged 83); Melbourne, Australia
- Education: Melbourne Grammar School; University of Melbourne; Harvard University
- Occupations: Businessman; business executive; philanthropist
- Relatives: Frederick Derham (great-grandfather); John Derham (father)

Sir Peter John Derham AC KStJ (21 August 1925 – 24 September 2008) was an Australian business executive and philanthropist who was Managing Director of Nylex.

Derham graduated from Melbourne Grammar School in 1943, followed by his completion of a BSc at the University of Melbourne in 1959. He is a former resident of Ormond College and International House. In 1940 he joined the forces and served as a member of the Royal Australian Navy from 1945 to 1946.

In 1980, Derham was knighted for his service to industry, including tourism and science. He has been heavily involved in the preservation and restoration of heritage sites, including Mawson's Huts, in Antarctica and sat on a number of prominent charity boards including the Alfred Hospital, Breast Cancer Network, Australian Koala Foundation and the Australian Childhood Foundation. In 1989 Derham and his wife Lady Derham established the renowned Red Hill Estate winery on the Mornington Peninsula.

In 2001, Derham was awarded the Companion of the Order of Australia (AC) for service as an innovator in tourism development, commerce and science, to the community and to the preservation of heritage sites in the Antarctic. At 80 years of age and after 21 years, Derham stood down from Circadian Technologies (ASX:CIR) as the founding chairman.

He died at Cabrini Hospital following a stroke, aged 83.
