= BTR plc =

20th-century British multinational industrial conglomerate company

- Type: Public
- Industry: Conglomerate
- Predecessor: The Leyland & Birmingham Rubber
- Founded: 1924; 102 years ago
- Defunct: 1999
- Fate: Merged with Siebe to form Invensys
- Headquarters: London, England
- Key people: David Nicolson (chairman); Owen Green (CEO & chairman); Alan Jackson (CEO)
- Revenue: £10 billion (1995)
- Number of employees: ~130,000 (1995)
- Subsidiaries: Dunlop Holdings; Nylex

BTR plc was a British multinational industrial conglomerate company. It was headquartered in London, England.

The company was originally founded in 1924 as the British Goodrich Rubber Co. Ltd as a subsidiary of the American rubber specialist B.F.Goodrich Company. Ten years later, it became the British Tyre & Rubber Co. Ltd after Goodrich sold its stake in the business; it moved into synthetic rubber and plastics during the 1940s and withdrew from tyre production in 1956, adopting the name BTR Ltd around the same timeframe. Management pursued a strategy of diversification and rationalisation that lasted into the mid-1960s.

During late 1966, BTR came under the control of a new central management team, which Sir Owen Green took the lead of in the following year. Green pursued a strategy of targeted growth towards opportunities that quickly would become lucrative. New subsidiaries would be created and numerous acquisitions would be undertaken by Green and later by Alan Jackson. This approach included multiple hostile takeovers by BTR (although some of these bids were unsuccessful) for Pilkington, Norton Abrasives, and Hawker Siddeley.

BTR was listed on the London Stock Exchange. During the 1990s, BTR accumulated a considerable debt burden and divested many of its divisions during restructuring efforts. In 1999, BTR merged with Siebe to form BTR Siebe, later renamed Invensys. Invensys was bought by and absorbed into Schneider Electric in 2014.

== History ==
=== Early years ===
BTR traces its origins back to 1924, at which point the American rubber specialist B.F.Goodrich Company formed a UK-based subsidiary, British Goodrich Rubber Co. Ltd. During 1934, Goodrich opted to sell the majority of its shares in the company, which promptly changed its name to the British Tyre & Rubber Co. Ltd. Shortly thereafter, it was successfully floated on the London Stock Exchange. The company primarily focused on the manufacture of tyres for road vehicles, conveyor belts, and industrial hoses. It benefitted considerably from several innovations developed during the Second World War, such as synthetic rubber and plastics. By 1955, British Tyre & Rubber was one of eleven tyre manufacturers operating in the UK.

During 1956, the company opted to cease production of tyres in favour of its other activities as this business unit was becoming increasingly unprofitable. To reflect the company's changing product line, its name was changed to BTR Limited. The late 1950s and early 1960s were marked by efforts towards diversification and rationalisation, however, BTR achieved poor fiscal performance up until the mid-1960s.

=== Owen Green and subsequent years; acquisitive industrial group ===
During late 1966, BTR came under the control of a new central management team; the prevailing philosophy was stated to be "growth is the goal, profit is the measure, security is the result". Furthermore, it was posited that, for the company to be strong and lucrative, it would need to operate on an international basis. To this end, BTR, through both acquisition and establishment, established numerous overseas operations; while in-house investment was favoured, external acquisitions were pursued where it was through to result in greater growth opportunities. This process was encouraged by the British government, which supported BTR's amalgamation with similar companies such as the Leyland and Birmingham Rubber Company.

Between 1967 and 1993, BTW was dominated by Sir Owen Green, who initially served as its managing director (until 1986) and then as its chairman. Green's principal focus was on operating margins and cash flow, which arguably came at the cost of long-term investment.

By 1982, BTR had acquired a large number of companies in the United Kingdom, the US, Canada, Australia, South Africa and Germany. These ventures ranged into various fields of work, from extracting raw materials such as natural and synthetic rubbers, textiles and chemicals, to insurance, pensions, corporate planning, international taxation and legal matters. The majority of BTR's product line were sold to other manufacturers and businesses. The company did not have a large centralised research and development division, a factor that led to the company being criticised for not valuing a long-term perspective.

Acquisitions continued through the 1980s; larger companies included the Tilling Group in 1983, and Dunlop Holdings plc in 1985. The Dunlop road tyre business was immediately sold to Sumitomo Rubber Industries. During late 1986, BTR launched a hostile takeover bid for Pilkington, a leading manufacturer of high quality glass with operations worldwide, which it valued at $1.64 billion. Pilington's management rejected the offer and fought a successful defensive campaign with politicians taking sides in the matter, thus BTR was compelled to withdraw its offer in February 1987. Three years later, BTR withdrew from another failed hostile takeover, this time of Norton Abrasives, which it had valued at $1.643 billion.

In 1988, BTR purchased Schlegel Corporation through a subsidiary. Schlegel had manufacturing facilities for door and window seals and related products in twelve countries. Schlegel made automobile and building products in Europe through its subsidiaries Schlegel UK and Schlegel GmbH. Following the purchase, BTR decided to transfer the Schlegel UK and Schlegel GmbH subsidiaries from Schlegel Corporation to itself. There was a dispute over how the transfer should be valued for tax purposes, with BTR valuing the Schlegel UK and Schlegel GmbH subsidiaries at $21.8 million and $9.4 million, while the Internal Revenue Service valued them at $49.1 million and $13.2 million. During the early to mid 1990s, under Alan Jackson’s stewardship as CEO, BTR controlled over 1,500 subsidiary companies in over 60 different countries. This was largely due to the takeover bids that were led by Green and, later, by Jackson.

In 1992, Hawker Siddeley was acquired by BTR in exchange for £1.5bn despite opposition from Hawker Siddeley's board. This was the first large hostile takeover of a company that Jackson had completed in his role as managing director. During that same year, he also purchased two smaller companies; Rockware, the UK's leading glass manufacturer and Pirreli, a sealing company. These were bought for A$400 and A$200 million respectively.

In 1995, BTR purchased Australian plastics manufacturer Nylex. This company during the late 1980s provided 41% of BTR's profits and kickstarted BTR's growth in the emerging markets of Southeast Asia. This was also due to the Malaysian wing of Nylex, Berhard.

One of the major ways BTR grew in size and in profits, was its continual takeover of other companies throughout the world. This led it to be a multinational conglomerate. Moreover, the company also gained further profits by investing large amounts of money in investing in capital and operations, as well as the methods used by Green and later Jackson, of ruthless cost-cutting. This included laying off staff and dispensing with unprofitable businesses. It was these methods that have been credited with the success of the company. Nevertheless, this approach also was perhaps BTR's greatest weakness, which came ahead in the late 1990s following the retirement of both Green and Jackson, at which point debt had risen to high levels. Restructuring efforts failed to revive the company, in which, became increasingly inefficient and unprofitable in various manufacturing sections.

=== Later years ===
BTR's activities in late 1990s was marked by a series of divestments, at which point the company was headed by Ian Strachan. During 1994, less than three years after arranging to acquire the company, BTR opted to spin off Hawker Siddeley Canada via a flotation on the Toronto Stock Exchange, swapping its 59 per cent holding for around £65 million. Similarly, after less than a decade of ownership, the company opted to sell Rockware.

Between 1996 and 1998, BTR sold the remaining Dunlop companies, and exited the aerospace sector entirely. In November 1997, UniPoly S.A, bought 32 companies from BTR, including the Schlegel Sealing and Shielding Group, at a reported cost of roughly $867 million. The deal was a management buyout in which UniPoly Group was formed to take over most of the rubber products business of BTR plc. During these years, BTR was organised in the following businesses areas: Engineering, Packaging, Materials, Building products, Polymers.

In 1999, BTR merged with Siebe to form BTR Siebe, which was renamed Invensys. The last chief executive of BTR, Ian Strachan, became the initial chief executive of Invensys following the merger. The merger has been viewed as a final admission that BTR's business model could no longer fulfil changes in customer expectations.

== Company heads ==
The company heads of BTR plc are only listed following the name change of BTR in 1956 until the takeover of BTR in 1999.

Chairmen of BTR Limited
Order	Chairman	Period	Reference
1	Unknown person	1956 – 1969	
2	Sir David Nicolson	1969 – 1984	
3	Sir Owen Green	1984 – 1993	
4	Sir Norman Ireland	1993 – 1995	
5	Elwyn Eilledge	1995 – 1999	
Managing directors / CEOs of BTR Limited
Order	MDs / CEOs	Period	Reference
1	Unknown person	1956 – 1967	
2	Sir Owen Green	1967 – 1984	
3	Sir Norman Ireland	1984 – 1987	
4	John Cahill	1987 – 1990	
5	Alan Jackson	1990 – 1996	
6	Ian Strachan	1996 – 2000	

== See also ==
- BTR Aerospace Group
