= Robert Johnston (businessman) =

Australian industrialist and businessman (1924–1995)

Robert Johnston AO

Chairman of the Australian Trade Commission
- In office 17 December 1993 – 7 May 1995
- Preceded by: Bill Ferris
- Succeeded by: Roger Allen (acting)

Personal details
- Born: Robert Henry 'Bob' Johnston; 26 May 1924 Camperdown, New South Wales, Australia
- Died: 7 May 1995 (aged 70) Houston, Texas, United States of America
- Spouse: Raymonde Garner (m. 1958; div. 1971)
- Education: North Newtown Boys' Intermediate High School; Sydney Technical College
- Occupation: Industrialist; businessman

Military service
- Allegiance: Australia
- Branch/service: Royal Australian Navy
- Years of service: 1942–1946
- Rank: Lieutenant
- Battles/wars: World War II; Pacific Campaign

Robert Henry Johnston AO (26 May 1924 – 7 May 1995) was an Australian industrialist and businessman who was the President of Toyota Australia from 1986 to 1994 and was the Chairman of the Australian Trade Commission (Austrade) between 1993 and 1995.

Robert Johnston was born in 1924 in Camperdown in Sydney, New South Wales. He studied at North Newtown Boys' Intermediate High School, where he matriculated in 1938. From there, Johnston began work as a copy-boy at John Fairfax & Sons. However, in June 1942 Johnston was selected for officer training in the Royal Australian Naval Reserve. It was by January 1943, in which he became a midshipman on HMAS Assault and later served on HMAS Kanimbla. He was later promoted to Lieutenant in May 1946. Johnston was decommissioned in June that year in which he later studied at the Sydney Technical College and became an associate of the Australian Society of Accountants.

Between 1951 and 1986 Johnston would rise through the ranks of the John Fairfax & Sons to become its chief financial officer and also other motor vehicle manufacturers in Australia, including the precursors to Toyota.

By 1986 the Japanese car manufacturer had concentrated significant control over various manufactures in Australia, leading to Johnston to become the chairman and chief executive officer of Toyota Australia. However, this would be further solidified in 1989, where Johnston also became the President of the new Toyota Australia, after the Melbourne and Sydney branches merged. Under Johnston's leadership Toyota emerged as the largest car manufacturer in Australia, surpassing both Holden and Ford. In addition to this, he would also become the President of the Federal Chamber of Automotive Industries from 1990 to 1992.

In November 1993 the Minister for Trade and Overseas Development, John Kerin, invited Johnston to lead the Australian Trade Commission (Austrade) board as Chairman, following the retirement of Bill Ferris. After retiring from Toyota in December 1994, the final year of his life was consumed by consistent bouts of ill health and cancer diagnoses. Ultimately, following Johnston's death in May 1995, at the age of 70, Prime Minister Paul Keating remarked in a press release that Johnston was a "true captain of Australian industry" and through his actions, had strengthened Australia's economic ties with the emerging markets of Japan and China.

In the 1994 Australia Day Honours List, Johnston was awarded with the Officer of the Order of Australia (AO) for service to manufacturing particularly in relation to the automotive industry.

Government offices
Preceded by Bill Ferris	Chairman of the Austrade; 17 December 1993 – 7 May 1995	Succeeded by Roger Allen (acting)
