= Tyman =

British building materials manufacturer

Tyman plc
- Formerly: Lupus Capital, Dean & Bowes Homes
- Company type: Subsidiary
- Traded as: Formerly LSE: TYMN
- Industry: Building products
- Founded: 1993; 33 years ago
- Headquarters: London, United Kingdom
- Revenue: ▼£657.6 million (2023)
- Operating income: ▼£60.2 million (2023)
- Net income: ▼£38.2 million (2023)
- Owner: Quanex Building Products Corporation
- Website: www.tymanplc.com

Tyman plc, formerly known as Lupus Capital, was a British manufacturer of building products, headquartered in London. The company was listed on the London Stock Exchange and was a constituent of the FTSE 250 Index until it was acquired by the United States building materials company, Quanex Inc, in August 2024.

== History ==
The company was established as a small property services business known as Dean & Bowes (Homes) Limited in 1993 but, after the founder, Stephen Dean, sold his investment to an investor group known as Lupus Associates in 1999, the property services business was sold and the company became an investment vehicle known as Lupus Capital.

Greg Hutchings, the former CEO of Tomkins plc, took control of the company in 2004. Under his management, Lupus Capital bought the Schlegel Building Products Division from Unipoly in March 2006, and then acquired the security business of Laird plc in April 2007.

After the company started making significant losses, in the context of the 2008 financial crisis, Hutchings left the business in 2009. The company acquired Fab & Fix, a doors and windows parts business based in Coventry, for £14.8 million in 2012.

In order to reflect a new focus as a building products business, rather than as a financial institution, the company changed its name from Lupus Capital to Tyman in February 2013.

In April 2024, the US building materials company, Quanex, made an offer to acquire Tyman for £788 million. The transaction was approved by the court on 1 August 2024, allowing the scheme to be completed.
