= David Nicolson =

British politician and company director (1922-1996)

Sir David Nicolson FCGI, FIMechE, FIProdE, FIMgt, FRSA
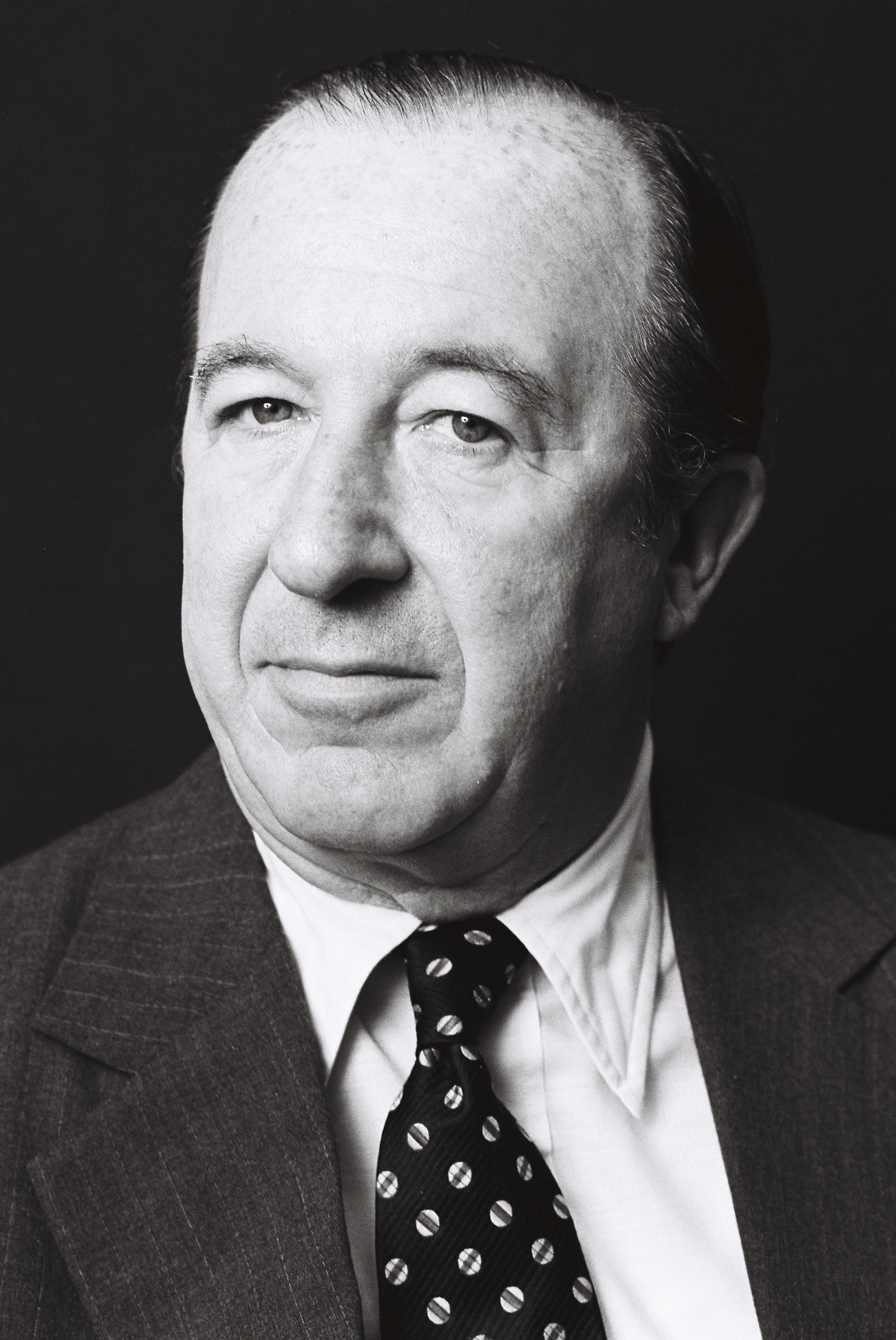
- Born: David Lancaster Nicolson; 20 September 1922; London, United Kingdom
- Died: 19 July 1996 (aged 73); London, United Kingdom
- Occupations: businessman; business executive; company director; industrialist; politician
- Spouse: Lady Joan Griffiths (m. 1945) (died 1991) Beryl Thorley (m. 1992)
- Children: 3

Sir David Lancaster Nicolson (20 September 1922 – 19 July 1996) was a British business executive and politician who played a key role in setting up British Airways and served for five years in the European Parliament. He was also the chairman of British conglomerate, BTR plc.

== Training ==
The son of a Canadian consulting engineer, Nicolson was born in London and educated at Haileybury but was forced to leave it when his father went blind and lost his income. Instead he won a scholarship to St Paul's School and went on from there to Imperial College London where he was elected a member of the Links Club. He was trained in engineering and was a Constructor Lieutenant in the Royal Corps of Naval Constructors during the Second World War (he served in the North Atlantic and during the invasion of Normandy, where he was mentioned in despatches for his work repairing damaged ships while under fire). Sir David Nicolson was a member of the Links Club of the City and Guilds College whilst at Imperial College.

== Early career ==
In the early 1950s Nicolson went to the United States, working as a production manager for Bucyrus-Erie Co. in South Milwaukee, Wisconsin, which had employed his father. He was appointed as a manager of Production-Engineering Ltd in 1953 and later became a director of the firm; from 1963 to 1968 he was chairman of the P-E Consulting Group, an associated company. In 1965 he was made deputy chairman of BTR Industries, and became company chairman between 1969 and 1984.

== British Airways ==
He was appointed chairman of the British Airways Board in 1971 after being recruited by John Davies, the Secretary of State for Trade and Industry in the government led by Edward Heath. Nicolson served for four years, during which he had the responsibility of uniting the two parts which had previously run as British Overseas Airways Corporation and British European Airways. Nicolson had no previous experience of the airline industry and also felt that the Aerospace Minister Michael Heseltine interfered with his work. However, he succeeded in integrating the schedules and the newly merged airline launched publicly in 1974.

A member of the Institute of Directors council from 1971 to 1976 and of the council of the Confederation of British Industry from 1972, Nicolson was made chairman of Rothmans International plc in 1975 after leaving British Airways. He chaired the CBI's Environment Committee in the late 1970s. He received a knighthood in 1975.

== Politics ==
Nicolson strongly supported the development of the European Communities and was pleased to be selected as a Conservative Party candidate for the European Parliament. He was elected and served as Member of the European Parliament for London Central from the 1979 election. However, dealing directly with European Commission processes left him increasingly disillusioned by the bureaucracy involved and he did not seek re-election when the term ended in 1984.

== Approach to business ==
Never a strong believer in politics, Nicolson regretted excessive involvement by politicians in the management of nationalised industries, and also noted often that few managers of high technology companies in Britain had technical qualifications themselves. Unlike many company directors of the period, Nicolson was broadly supportive of trade unions. He sometimes told audiences during lectures that his hero was Napoleon. He was Chairman of the European Movement from 1985 to 1988 and Pro-Chancellor of the University of Surrey from 1987 to 1993.

== Retirement ==
After further business posts, Nicolson largely retired in 1992 to Bale, near Fakenham in Norfolk. He led an appeal that year which led to the building of the Canadian War Memorial in Green Park, but he had few hobbies and did not enjoy the life of a retired businessman. In 1996 he died after suffering a stroke while attending the funeral of an old friend.

== Honours and awards ==
- 1975 – Knighthood by Queen Elizabeth II

Business positions
Preceded by	Chairman of BTR PLC; 1969–1984	Succeeded by Sir Owen Green

== Sources ==
- Who Was Who
- Obituary, The Times, 26 July 1996
