= Beau Miles =

Australian YouTuber (born 1979)

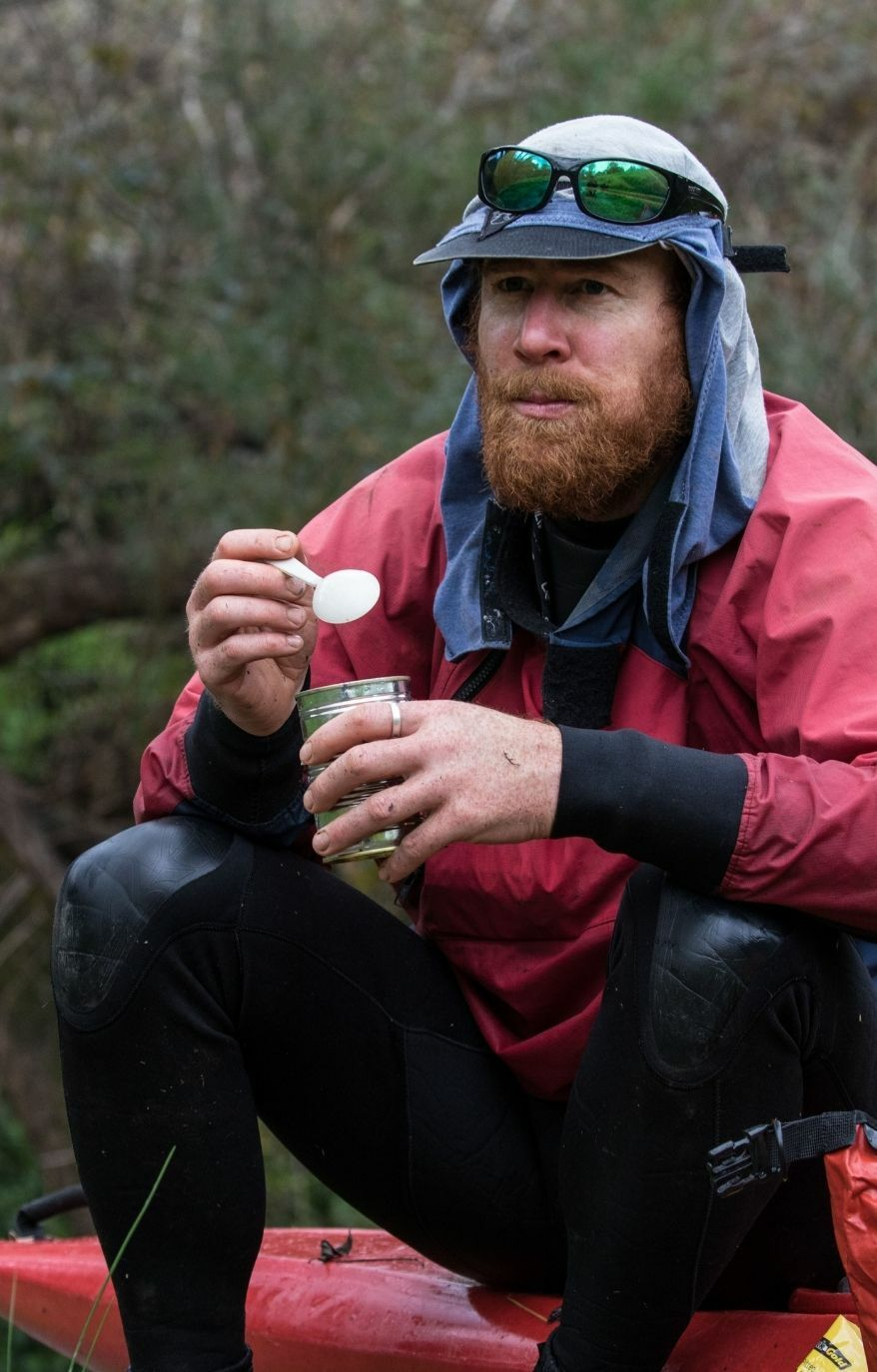
- Born: 21 December 1979 (age 46)
- Education: Monash University
- Occupations: YouTuber; educator; author; outdoorsman
- Spouse: Helen Barclay
- Children: 2

YouTube information
- Channel: Beau Miles
- Years active: 2016–present
- Subscribers: 872 thousand
- Views: 95.509 million
- Last updated: 27 August 2026
- Website: beaumiles.com

Dr Beau Miles (born 1979) is an Australian YouTuber, educator, author, and outdoorsman.

== Career ==
Miles's father was a painter. Miles started as an undergraduate student in 1999 at Monash University in Melbourne, Australia. He started to lecture at Monash in outdoor education, and later earned his PhD in Outdoor Education at Monash. In 2016, Miles started his YouTube channel for his PhD project, "Bass by Kayak" in a 6-part video series; his thesis, an autoethnographic study of sea kayaking, was published in 2018. In 2021, Beau quit his job as a lecturer and became a full time father and YouTuber. In 2021, Beau released his first book, The Backyard Adventurer.

Prior to his YouTube career, Miles attempted a 4,000 kilometres (2,500 miles) kayak trip around the southern tip of Africa and ran 650 kilometres (400 miles) across the Australian Alps.

=== Adventures ===
Miles is best known for his self-imposed adventures, which he films and posts to his YouTube channel. These challenges have included walking 90 kilometres (56 miles) to Monash University from his home in Jindivick, exclusively eating beans for 40 days, and running a marathon at a pace of roughly one mile every hour over a 24-hour period.

In 2021, Miles planted a tree every minute for 24 hours straight, creating a small forest of 1,400 trees and shrubs on a patch of paddock in West Gippsland.

== Personal life ==
Miles is married to Helen Barclay and, as seen on his YouTube videos, they have two daughters together.
