= Schlegel International =

Manufacturer of door and window seals

- Formerly: Schlegel Manufacturing Company, Schlegel Corporation
- Type: Limited liability
- Industry: Door and window seals and related products
- Founded: c. 1885 in Rochester, New York
- Founder: Charles Schlegel
- Area served: International
- Key people: Peter Santo (CEO)
- Products: Seals, related hardware
- Brands: Poly-Bond, Aquamac, Q-Lon, ERA, Fab & Fix
- Owner: Tyman plc
- Website: www.schlegel.com

Schlegel International is a multi-national company based in the United Kingdom that makes seals for windows and doors, and supplies related hardware. The company was founded in Rochester, New York in the 1880s as a narrow-loom weaving operation. By 1988 it had manufacturing facilities in twelve countries, making seals for windows and doors in buildings and automobiles. That year it was acquired by BTR plc of the United Kingdom. In 1997 the Schlegel operations were acquired by UniPoly S.A. in a BTR management buy-out. From 2006 Schlegel International, with manufacturing operations in Europe, Australia and Brazil, was a subsidiary of Lupus Capital, now called Tyman plc. The Schlegel brand is also used for products made near Rochester, New York, by Schlegel International's North American sister company AmesburyTruth.

== History ==
=== Early years ===
Charles P. Schlegel (Note: Schlegel Hall, opened in 1991 at the University of Rochester is named for the parents of the lead benefactor, Helen Schlegel Moretz, who graduated from the university in 1937.) and Henry A. Schaefer founded a narrow loom weaving business in Rochester, New York, United States, in the late 1880s. Schlegel Manufacturing was first located on North Water Street, soon after moved to Canal Street and finally moved to the corner of Goodman Street and College Avenue. The company at first made hem bindings for women's skirts to protect them when dragging on the ground, then diversified into "surrey fringes" for horse-drawn buggies. For many years the company advertised its product line as "carriage, basket and dress trimmings". The company moved into supplying textile trimmings to car manufacturers, and became a specialist in automobile door and window weather seals. Schlegel Canada Inc. was established in 1931.

During World War II (1939–1945) the company tore down and redesigned its looms so they could make machine gun belts. There were many technical difficulties, including specification changes, but full production began by the summer of 1943. The company produced six million belts for .30 and .50 caliber machine gun bullets, then converted to making gun slings.

After the war the company expanded into making seals for all types of doors and windows. Schlegel started to make pile weatherstripping and plastic profiles for the building industry. In 1956 the president of Schlegel Manufacturing Company was Carl F. Schlegel, and the Vice President, Research was Norman C. Schlegel. The company's laboratory was investigating industrial textiles, plastics and adhesives. In the 1960s Schlegel introduced a continuous molded urethane process for foam weatherstripping. As of 1973 Schlegel Manufacturing, based in Rochester, New York, was supplying rigid vinyl strips for weathersealing doors. In 1973 it was announced that Schlegel Illinois. Inc., a subsidiary, had introduced a closed-cell sponge rubber gasket for drums.

As of 1981 Schlegel had become a major conglomerate, still with its headquarters in Rochester, with one of its main factories in Henrietta, New York. By 1986 Schlegel Corporation of Rochester, New York, had 22 marketing centers worldwide, including Schlegel Technology Pte Ltd in Singapore and Schlegel Pty Ltd in Australia. In 1988 Schlegel had manufacturing facilities in twelve countries. Schlegel Corporation made automobile and building products in Europe through its subsidiaries Schlegel UK and Schlegel GmbH. Schlegel UK had two separate operating divisions for Automotive and Building products. Ford and Rover accounted for about two-thirds of the Automotive product's sales. By the late 1980s the company was in difficulty. Schlegel UK had signed a contract with Rover that required it to make a "sprayed-on slip coat" window seal, and had difficulty with the unfamiliar technology. The factory building required extensive repairs. The company was offered for sale. Prospective buyers included BTR Plc, Draftex, Pirelli/Metzler, Diversitech, Standard Products and Continental AG.

=== BTR subsidiary ===
The UK-based BTR plc purchased Schlegel Corporation in late 1988 through a subsidiary. BTR Dunlop, a wholly owned US-based subsidiary of BTR plc, was the purchaser. After the purchase, BTR decided to transfer the Schlegel UK and Schlegel GmbH subsidiaries from Schlegel Corporation to itself. There was some controversy over how the transfer should be valued for tax purposes, with the company valuing the Schlegel UK and Schlegel GmbH subsidiaries at $21,846,000 and $9,400,000, while the Internal Revenue Service valued them at $49,069,000 and $13,246,000.

In 1990 Schlegel Corporation purchased a 600,000 square feet (56,000 m^{2}) rubber facility built in 1937 in Keokuk, Iowa, from United Technologies Corporation. In 1995 BTR rebranded the product line to BTR Sealing Systems. In 1993 the UK subsidiary reported that it was upgrading to infrared ovens to bond the low-friction coating to its car window seals, reducing time and energy used in the process. In July 1995 it was announced that BTR, parent of US-based Schlegel Corporation and manufacturer of automotive component businesses such as Metzeler and Dunlop, was establishing a joint venture in New Delhi, India. Wadco-Schlegel would make automotive body and glass channel seals for Indian vehicle manufacturers. At this time BTR made about 18% of its rubber-related sales in the US, mainly through Schlegel and the Stowe Woodward manufacturer of roll coverings and printing blankets.

=== Later ownership changes ===
In November 1997 UniPoly S.A, bought 32 companies from BTR, including the Schlegel Sealing and Shielding Group. The acquisition cost about $867 million. The deal was a management buy-out in which UniPoly Group was formed to take over most of the rubber products business of BTR PLC. As of 2001 its main operations were UniPoly Enerka (conveyor belts), UniPoly Hiflex Netherlands (fluid handling) and UniPoly Schlegel Holdings. In 2001 the banks that had funded the buy-out installed Michael Teacher as chief executive in an effort to turn around the struggling business.

In March 2006 Lupus Capital bought the Schlegel Building Products Division from Unipoly. The acquisition cost Lupus £84 million on a debt free/cash free basis. Lupus Capital is the vehicle for Greg Hutchings. The sale of Schlegel reduced UniPoly debt to close to par. Lupus Capital plc changed its name to Tyman plc in February 2013. In February 2014 Schlegel International completed acquisition of Vedasil, a Brazilian manufacturer of pile weatherseals.

== Structure ==
As of July 2015, Schlegel International was a division of Tyman, an international supplier of door and window components. The company had manufacturing plants in the UK, Spain, Germany, Australia and Brazil. Manufacturing subsidiaries, which also distribute products:

- Schlegel UK (Henlow, Bedfordshire), foam weatherstrip
- Schlegel Building Products (Newton Aycliffe, County Durham, UK), pile weatherstrip and extrusions
- Schlegel Spain (Barcelona, Spain), pile weatherstrip
- Schlegel Germany (Hamburg, Germany), foam weatherstrip and extrusions
- Schlegel Australia (Sydney, Australia), foam and pile weatherstrips and other products
- Schlegel Brazil (Valinhos, Brazil), door & window weather seals and insect screens

Distribution subsidiaries:

- Schlegel Italy (Milan, Italy)
- Schlegel New Zealand (Auckland, New Zealand)
- Schlegel Singapore (Singapore)

The other Tyman divisions in 2015 were AmesburyTruth (hardware components, extrusions and sealing systems) and ERA (Security). The Schlegel division of Amesbury, located in Rochester, NY, manufactures urethane foam, plastic and textile weatherstripping for windows and doors in buildings, and products for the transportation and copier industries.

== Products ==
The company makes foam, brush pile and extruded seals. Hardware components included locks, handles, hinges and friction stays. The Singapore subsidiary also distributes Dr Hahn hinges in the Asia-Pacific market. A 1996 book describes Schlegel seals being used in acoustic doors. Schlegel makes sealing systems and related hardware products for distributors and fabricators. Apart from seals, products include cleaning brushes, static control devices for copiers and printers, tractor seat trim, sway bar bushes, automobile sunroof seals and truck spray suppressants.
