= Joseph Jackson (explorer) =

British-Australian explorer (1832–1868)

- Born: Joseph Henry Jackson; 1 January 1832; Leeds, Kent, United Kingdom
- Died: 1 February 1868 (aged 36); Gippsland, Colony of Victoria
- Occupations: Explorer; pastoralist
- Spouse: Eleanor Jackson (m. 1854; died 1880)
- Relatives: Alan Jackson; Margaret Jackson

Joseph Henry Jackson (1 January 1832 – 1 February 1868) was a British-born Australian explorer in the Gippsland region of Victoria during the middle of the 19th century. He was the first European settler in Jindivick and founded ‘Jackson’s Track’ along the main road of the town and the surrounding region.

He was born in Leeds, Kent in the United Kingdom. He was married to Eleanor Jackson (née Litt) on the 4th of August 1854 in Melbourne. He died in the Gippsland in 1868 at the age of 36.

Jackson was a pastoralist and explorer who, in 1858, blazed a track for the gold miners and pastoralists in the local area. Since then, he has been recognised for his contributions by the local council areas in the region since the Bicentenary of the First Fleet was celebrated in 1988.
