= John Derham (businessman) =

Australian businessman and entrepreneur (1900–1953)

- Born: Frederick John Walcott Derham; 21 July 1900; Armadale, Victoria, Australia
- Died: 12 May 1953 (aged 52); Toorak, Victoria, Australia
- Education: Melbourne Grammar School
- Occupations: Businessman; salesman; entrepreneur
- Relatives: Frederick Derham (grandfather); Sir Peter Derham (son)

Frederick John Walcott Derham (21 July 1900 – 12 May 1953) was an Australian entrepreneurial businessman who founded the company that would become known as Nylex.

John Derham grew up in Melbourne, where he studied at Melbourne Church of England Grammar School, but was not very academic. However, he won the Head of the River title in his school rowing team in 1918. Due to the influence of his grandfather, Frederick Derham, he increasingly became interested in business and commodities. That led him to become a salesman in a variety of companies before the 1930s Depression.

Derham began his career as an entrepreneurial plastics manufacturer in 1927, founding Victoria’s first plastics firm, the Australian Moulding Corporation. Immediately after the Depression, Derham invested in the construction of radio receivers and new plastic materials. During World War II, Derham was required to manufacture army crash helmets and jungle telephone wires for the war effort.

From 1941, the company began to brand itself "Nylex", a process which was completed by 1967. After the war, Derham broadened his business to include a greater variety of plastics, such as gardening hoses, during the post-war boom. The decision was also later made to move to manufacturing to Mentone, allowing the company to fulfil greater demand for plastic commodities such as raincoats, hoses and wall papers.

Derham died in 1953, following a series of heart attacks which were caused by his unhealthy drinking and smoking habits. He was survived by his wife and three children. His son, Sir Peter Derham, assumed the position of managing director of Nylex until the 1970s.
