= Nylex =

Australian manufacturer of a range of plastic goods

Nylex Limited
- Type: Public
- Industry: Conglomerate Plastics manufacturer
- Founded: 1927; 99 years ago
- Founder: John Derham
- Headquarters: Sydney, Australia
- Key people: Peter Derham (chairman); Alan Jackson (CEO and chairman)
- Products: Plastics; appliances; gardening tools
- Revenue: A$6.7 billion (1994)
- Total assets: A$11.8 billion (1995)
- Number of employees: ~12,000 (1987)
- Parent: BTR plc AMES Australasia
- Website: www.nylex.com.au

Nylex Plastics, founded in 1927, is an Australian manufacturer of a range of plastic goods, such as trigger sprayers. It was originally called the Australian Moulding Corporation but changed its name in 1948. The founder was John Derham. During the period between 1990 and 2009, the company was listed on the Australian Securities Exchange (ASX) and was considered to be the largest manufacturing company in Australia and in the top 25 largest companies in the country. It continues to operate in the form of its gardening products branch, which produces and sells plastic gardening products throughout Australia using the Nylex branding. A company that was previously a subsidiary, Nylex (Malaysia) Berhard, also still operates.

== History ==
=== Derham era ===
The Nylex brand has its origins with the Australian Moulding Corporation in 1927. This was a plastics manufacturing firm, founded by John Derham in Mentone, Melbourne in 1927. A rival company, Moulded Products, started in 1931, and Derham sold his company to it, while himself getting a share of Moulded Products. He then later gained control of all of Moulded Products with some colleagues, thus ending up with both companies.

The company expanded to make a range of products, and in World War Two produced plastic radio receivers and Army crash helmets (such as the M42 Duperite helmet). The demand for products during WW2 saw a lot of innovation as the company expanded into producing different types of plastics, including PVC and polymers. Specific innovations for the military at the time included PVC copolymer solution for moisture-proofing rifles, PVC wire coating, moisture proof striking surfaces for matches.

The company started producing garden products in the 1950s. Australian Moulding Corporation became Nylex. Derham died in 1957, and the company was eventually managed by his son, Peter Derham in 1967. Peter Derham worked with the company for most of his life and other family members managing various parts of the business. Nylex was eventually purchased by Australian Consolidated Industries (ACI).

=== BTR era ===
Nylex was purchased by British company BTR Hopkins in 1984 from ACI. In 1988, however, Jackson took over the Australian Consolidated Industries Limited (ACI) itself for a takeover of roughly $1.6 billion, following the share market crash. BTR, then a large global concern headed by Alan Jackson, re-branded the company as BTR Nylex. Under BTR, the company again expanded, with BTR Nylex being the Asian headquarters and central focus point for multiple BTR acquisitions within Asia, including in Malaysia. During this period, BTR Nylex purchased a number of important Asian business operating in related fields, including purchases of plastics companies e.g. China General Plastics in Taiwan and Japan, and a 51% stake in Nylex Malaysia. Jackson improved BTR Nylex's operations in Asia, greatly expanding the business into expanding areas, including recycling PET bottle and glass operations, and the purchase of Formica in the United States. His results in the Asian sector saw him appointed to London to manage the global BTR business, applying his same strategies of success in 1991. While CEO of BTR and Nylex in 1995, Jackson completed the full takeover of Nylex. The remaining 37% of the company that BTR did not own was to be purchased. Jackson bought it for $4.48 billion. In that same year, Nylex was estimated to be worth $11.8 billion.

=== Austrim era ===
Jackson later moved to another company, Austrim, after leaving BTR as its CEO. Austrim, having expanded under Jackson's strategic direction, acquired Nylex in October 1998 for A$63 million, when BTR completely collapsed. The same man who had previously purchased the company representing BTR, was now representing Austrim in the purchase. However, the purchase was not as costly as before because BTR had sold off part of the company following Jackson's retirement from BTR in 1996. The company became at that point Austrim Nylex, which was then simplified to Nylex once again, with Jackson commenting that the Nylex brand in Australia was better known compared to Austrim, and this could help the business further grow. Austrim Nylex eventually owned 30 major brands in Australia, including control of many textile companies, but profit margins had become thin and large amounts of borrowing, to expand the company in a short period of time, led the company to begin be unable to pay back its loans. Jackson stayed with the company, eventually leaving in 2001. Following this, the company began decreasing in profit margins and got furthered indebted as a result. The subsequent chief executives could not turn the tides of Nylex's trajectory. The company remained roughly in that same form until the 2008 financial crisis.

== Products ==
Kitchenware, light fittings and other household products were produced under the Duperite brand throughout the 1940s and 1950s. Nylex also produced products under the Melmac brand.

Nylex's brightly colored Bessemer line of informal tablewares was common in Australian homes in the 1960s. Nylex started making plastic Esky products (originally produced by Malleys) in 1984. By the time of collapse the company was producing a range of products including garden hose, Esky Coolers, floor tiles, car trim and parts, fuel tanks, water tanks and wheelie bins.

Esky coolers were particular well known in Australia, and were an iconic Australian brand, the name used in Australia as a general term for a hamper cooler.

== Nylex Clock ==
Nylex moved to Cremorne Street, Richmond, in the 1950s, and John Derham's office overlooked the Silos. Derham realised it would be a prominent spot for promotion of his company, which at that time was expanding and the publicity would be beneficial. He decided to move ahead with putting a Neon sign on the silos, ultimately concluded by his son Peter Derham. At the time the staff referred to it as "Derham's folly" and it was seen as a waste of money, but ultimately it became a famous landmark promoting the Nylex brand. The Nylex Clock, erected in 1961, remains a prominent feature of the Melbourne skyline, visible from various parts of Melbourne, including the Melbourne Cricket Ground (MCG).

== Company collapse ==
The company went into liquidation in 2009, after it failed to pay finance on A$60 million worth of debt. The receivership was handled by McGrathNicol. Ferrier Hodgson represented the company, which continued to trade throughout the process. At the time, it had eight subsidiaries producing, among other things, garden hoses, Esky Coolers, film, plastic car parts and water tanks.

There were a number of reasons for the company's collapse, particularly competition from cheap Asian plastic imports. In the BTR and Austrim eras, the company had expanded exponentially, but that had cut profit margins. Under Alan Jackson, Nylex had moved into purchasing businesses in loss-making sectors, including textiles, which were suffering significant downturns at the time. Despite owning major, well-known Australian brands, the company was unable to use them to generate cash to sustain the company.

Nylex had benefited from the water tank arm of its business, which had received subsidies because of a drought. When the drought broke, Government subsidies stopped and tanks started being imported from Asia. In addition, the decline of the car industry affected Nylex's car part business. The company had seen write downs for many of its operations but had been supported by people such as Kerry Stokes while others had pulled out. In addition to that, the 2008 financial crisis took its toll on the company.

At the time of collapse, Nylex owed A$100 million to creditors. Some of its businesses were sold, including the popular Esky brand of food coolers, which was bought by US company Coleman. Most of its industrial/commercial real estate was sold, much of it being turned into residential apartments. The large Mentone site, which had previously employed 1000 workers, became a part-commercial, part-residential development, though a heritage-protected Nylex sign remains.

== Current operations ==
The Nylex brand continues to exist, selling plastic garden hose and garden products throughout Australia, through large hardware outlets. The company supports cricket in Australia, sponsoring the Melbourne Renegades. The company is currently owned by AMES Australasia since a 2014 acquisition that cost A$36 million. This included other companies as well as Nylex during this purchase.

A company previously owned by BTR Nylex as a subsidiary, Nylex (Malaysia) Berhad, operates as a major plastics manufacturing concern in Malaysia.
