= Laird plc =

Defunct British technology company

Laird
- Type: Public
- Traded as: LSE: LRD
- Industry: Electronics
- Founded: 1824
- Defunct: 2018
- Fate: Acquired
- Headquarters: London, United Kingdom
- Key people: Dr Martin Read CBE Chairman; Tony Quinlan CEO
- Revenue: £936.6 million (2017)
- Operating income: £63.8 million (2017)
- Net income: £71.8 million (2017)
- Website: www.laird-plc.com

Laird plc was a leading British-based electronics and technology business. It was listed on the London Stock Exchange until it was acquired by Advent International in July 2018.

== History ==
The company was founded by John Laird in 1824 as Birkenhead Ironworks in Birkenhead, Wirral. In 1903 it merged with Charles Cammell & Company Limited and, as Cammell Laird, went on to build numerous ships for the Royal Navy. In 1976 its transport division, which traded as Metro-Cammell, secured a major order to build mass transit railway carriages for the Hong Kong Mass Transit System.

In 1977 its shipbuilding business was nationalised and in 1989 it disposed of its mass transit railway activities. In the 1980s it moved into security products and in the 1990s into electronics. In 2000 it disposed of its automotive industry activities and more recently, in 2007, it disposed of its security business to Lupus Capital. In 2008 it changed its name from Laird Group PLC to Laird PLC.

The company subsequently expanded in electronics with acquisitions such as Wisconsin based LS Research in November 2015 and German based Novero in December 2015.

In March 2018 Advent International made an offer for the company valuing at £1 billion. The transaction was completed in July 2018.

Advent subsequently broke Laird up, selling Laird Connected Vehicles to Molex Electronic Technologies in September 2018, Laird Thermal Systems to Bregal Unternehmerkapital in July 2021, Laird Performance Materials to DuPont also in July 2021, and Laird Antennas to TE Connectivity in November 2021.

== Operations ==
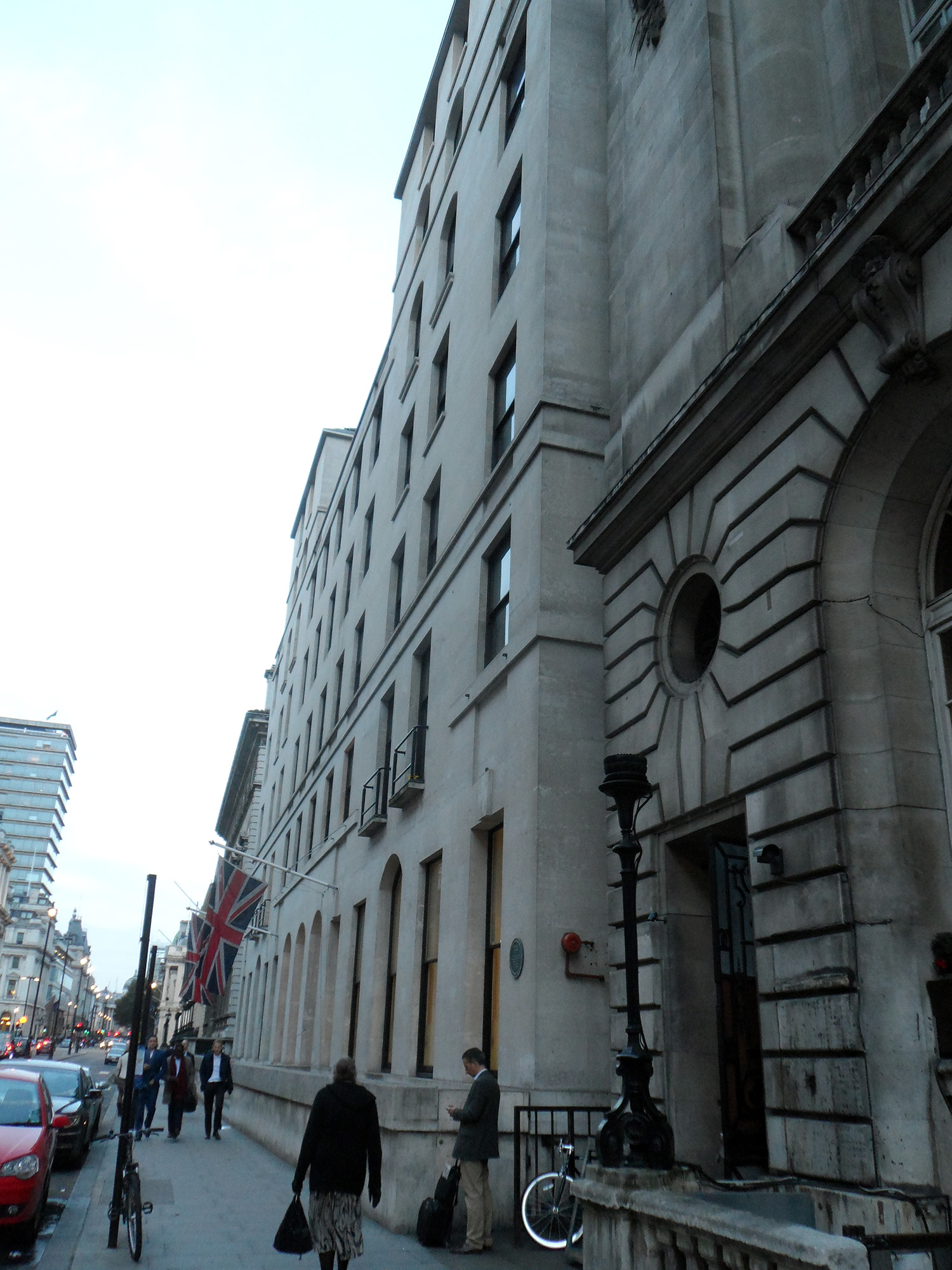
Laird's offices at 100 Pall Mall

The company's had operations organised as follows:

- Performance Materials
- Wireless and Thermal Systems
- Connected Vehicle Solutions
