= Ross Adler =

Australian business executive and director (1944–2025)

Ross Adler AC
- Born: Norman Ross Adler; 13 December 1944; Melbourne, Victoria, Australia
- Died: 30 July 2025 (aged 80)
- Education: University of Melbourne; Columbia University; University of Adelaide
- Occupation: Business executive
- Office: CEO, Santos (1986–2000); Director, Commonwealth Bank (1990–2004); Director, Telstra (1996–2001); Chairman, Austrade (2001–2006); Deputy Chancellor, University of Adelaide (2007–2009) Chairman, Art Gallery of South Australia (1990–2000)
- Awards: Companion of the Order of Australia

Norman Ross Adler AC (13 December 1944 – 30 July 2025) was an Australian business executive and managing director of Santos from 1986 to 2000. He also chaired the board of Austrade from 2001 to 2006.

== Background ==
Adler was born on 13 December 1944. He went to the University of Melbourne and graduated with Bachelor of Commerce (BCom) in 1966. He received a Master of Business Administration (MBA) from Columbia University and the University of Adelaide.

Adler died on 30 July 2025, at the age of 80.

== Career ==
In 1975 Adler became Managing Director of Brown and Dureau Ltd a company that had been associated with the Adler family for many years. When the company was purchased by APM Ltd in 1980 Adler became Managing Director of APM. After a major restructure of APM Ltd Adler joined Santos Ltd as Managing Director in 1985 where he spent the next 15 years until his retirement in 2000. In 1990, Adler was made director of the Commonwealth Bank, after holding various management positions in other companies for fifteen years. He left the position in 2004. Adler later became the Director of Telstra between 1996 and 2001. Afterwards, he was appointed by the Minister for Trade and Investment, Mark Vaile, to Chair the Australian Trade Commission (Austrade). He served in this role from 2001 to 2006, after the sudden resignation of Alan Jackson in 2001. In this period, Adler also became the Chairman and CEO of Amtrade International Pty Ltd from 2001 to 2005 as well as the Chairman of Domino's Pizza Enterprises in Australia and New Zealand for two years in 2005 and 2006. After this, he had a short stint as the Chairman of the Adelaide Festival in 2006/2007 and was also the Deputy Chancellor of the University of Adelaide from 2007–2009. For a couple of years in 2007/2008, Adler was the Chairman of both the Port Adelaide Maritime Corporation and the Defence SA Advisory Board. From 2008, Adler held senior board positions at the Adelaide Entertainment Centre and the University of Adelaide in the university's Management Advisory Committee and Alumni Association.

== Honours and awards ==
- Companion of the Order of Australia (AC), 11 June 2007

For service to business and commerce, particularly through the promotion of international trade and as a contributor to company and commercialisation development in Australia, to the community through administrative roles with educational institutions, and as a supporter of the arts.

- Officer of the Order of Australia (AO), 26 January 1999

For service to business and commerce, to the promotion of the arts in South Australia, and to the community.

- Centenary Medal, 1 January 2001

For outstanding service to Australia's international trade

Government offices
Preceded by Alan Jackson	Chairman of the Austrade; 2001 − 2006	Succeeded by Office abolished

Business positions
Preceded by	Managing Director of Santos; 1986 − 2000	Succeeded by
