= M1942 =

M1942 may refer to:

- M1942 bayonet for the M1 Garand battle rifle of the United States Army
- M1942 Liberator (FP-45), World War II single shot pistol for partisans
- 76 mm divisional gun M1942 (ZiS-3)
- 45 mm anti-tank gun M1942 (M-42)
- M-1942 Paratrooper uniform
- M1942 machete
- M1942 bolo knife

== See also ==
- M42 (disambiguation)
