= M42 Duperite helmet =

Helmet issued to Australian paratroopers during World War II

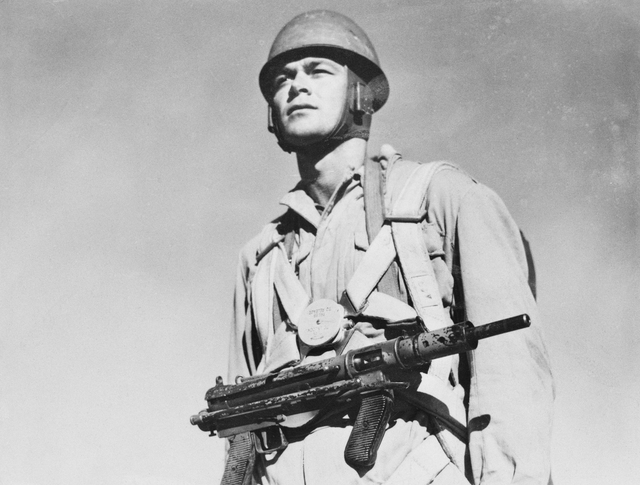
Australian paratrooper with M42 Duperite helmet

The M42 Duperite helmet was a paratrooper helmet issued to Australian paratroopers during World War II and was produced by the Australian Moulding Corporation. The helmet got its eponymous name from the shock impact-absorbing material it was composed of. It was similar to the first of the British dispatch rider helmets.
