= Frederick Derham =

Australian politician and businessman (1844–1922)

The Honourable Frederick Derham

18th Postmaster-General of Victoria
- In office 20 February 1886 – 18 August 1890
- Premier: Duncan Gillies
- Preceded by: James Campbell
- Succeeded by: Sir James Patterson

Member of the Victorian Legislative Assembly for Port Melbourne
- In office 1889–1892
- Preceded by: Electorate created
- Succeeded by: Philip Salmon

Member of the Victorian Legislative Assembly for Sandridge
- In office February 1883 – March 1889
- Preceded by: Sir John Madden
- Succeeded by: Electorate disbanded

Personal details
- Born: Frederick Thomas Derham; 8 January 1844 Bristol, Gloucestershire, United Kingdom
- Died: 12 March 1922 (aged 78) Kew, Victoria, Australia
- Party: Non-Party Conservatism
- Spouse(s): Ada Anderson (m. 1864, died) Francis Swallow (m. 1878, died)
- Relatives: John Derham (grandson); Sir Peter Derham (great-grandson)
- Profession: Businessman; Legislator

Frederick Thomas Derham (8 January 1844 – 12 March 1922) was an Australian politician and businessman.

Born in Bristol, he grew up in Somerset to auctioneer Thomas Plumley Derham and Sarah Ann Watts, he arrived in Melbourne in 1856 and entered the business world. In 1864 he married Ada Maria Anderson in Melbourne, with whom he had four children; he later married Frances Dodd Swallow in 1878, with whom he had five children.

In the early 1850s, he co-founded and worked with Thomas Swallow in a biscuits manufacturing business in 1856. Derham also invested in sugar plantations in which fruit canneries and preserving works were developed near Cairns, Queensland in the 1870s.

Derham began his political career as the Mayor of Sandridge Municipal Council in the early 1880s. In 1883 he was elected to the Victorian Legislative Assembly as the member for Sandridge, shifting to Port Melbourne in 1889; he served as Postmaster-General from 1886 to 1890. In that role, he introduced the penny post into Victoria and also parcel post and country telephone services. During his time in politics, Derham had a close working relationship with 2nd Prime Minister, Alfred Deakin and was a passionate anti-socialist in his policies and political views. Subsequently, he was president of the Chamber of Manufacturers from 1897 to 1903 and of the Employers' Federation from 1901 to 1904.

Derham was a passionate Anglican and supporter of the Holy Trinity Church in Kew. Derham later died at Kew in 1922.
