= Owen Green =

British business executive and director (1925–2017)

Sir Owen Green FCA FCMI
- Born: Owen Whitley Green; 14 May 1925; Stockton-on-Tees, Durham, United Kingdom
- Died: 1 June 2017 (aged 92); London, United Kingdom
- Occupations: Accountant; business executive; industrialist
- Spouse: Lady Doreen Spark (m. 1948)
- Children: 3

Sir Owen Whitley Green FCA FCMI (14 May 1925 – 1 June 2017) was chief executive and later chairman of the British industrial conglomerate BTR plc.

== Early life ==
Green was born in Stockton on Tees on 14 May 1925. He served with the Royal Naval Reserve from 1942 to 1946. In 1948 he married Doreen Spark (died 2006), with whom he had a son and two daughters. He qualified as an accountant in 1950.

== Career ==
Green joined BTR as finance director in 1956. In 1967 he became managing director and chief executive, and from 1984 to 1993 he was chairman. His acquisitions made BTR one of the leading industrial conglomerates of the 1980s. The 1983 bid for the Thomas Trilling conglomerate and the 1985 acquisition of Dunlop Holdings were particularly high-profile and acrimonious. He worked closely with Alan Jackson who was the CEO of BTR while Green was chairman.

From 1988 to 1993 Green was also director of The Spectator and a trustee of the Natural History Museum.

Green died on 1 June 2017.

== Honours and awards ==
- In 1982, he was voted businessman of the year.
- In 1984, Green received a knighthood in the 1984 Birthday Honours and awarded the gold medal of the British Institute of Management.

Business positions
| Preceded by Sir David Nicolson | Chairman of BTR PLC; 1984 – 1993 | Succeeded by Sir Norman Ireland |
| Preceded by | Chief Executive Officer of BTR PLC; 1967 – 1984 | Succeeded by Sir Norman Ireland |
