= Bill Ferris =

Australian philanthropist and entrepreneur (born 1942)

Bill Ferris AC

Chairman of the Australian Trade Commission
- In office 1986 – 17 December 1993
- Preceded by: Office created
- Succeeded by: Robert Johnston

Personal details
- Born: William Duncan Ferris; 26 July 1945 (age 81) Sydney, New South Wales, Australia
- Education: University of Sydney; Harvard Business School
- Occupation: Philanthropist, entrepreneur, executive
- Known for: Pioneer of venture capital and private equity in Australia. Founded the Ferris Family Foundation.

William Duncan Ferris AC (born 26 July 1945) is an Australian philanthropist and entrepreneur. He is the founder of the Ferris Foundation, which supports the arts and culture in Australia, and he is the author of three books. He was appointed a Companion of the Order of Australia (AC) for service to the community through a range of philanthropic endeavours.

== Early life and education ==
Ferris holds an Honours degree in economics from the University of Sydney and a Master of Business Administration from Harvard Business School where he graduated as a Baker Scholar in 1970.

== Career ==
Ferris has served several major organizations throughout his career. He served as a director on the boards of several companies, including Accolade Wines Australia and UK, Austar, Macquarie University Asia Pacific Council, Austal and the Australian Institute of Management, Brandon BioCatalyst and AdvanCell Pty Ltd.

Ferris founded Australia's first venture capital firm in 1970. He co-founded Australian Mezzanine Investments in 1987 with Joseph Skrzynski. In 1999, he teamed with Skrzynski again and Castle Harlan to create Castle Harlan Australian Mezzanine Partners, also known as CHAMP, which became a leading private equity firm in the Asia-Pacific region. CHAMP (now known as CPE Capital) focuses on control investments in middle-market businesses in Australia and Southeast Asia. CHAMP raised its second fund with A$950 million of investor commitments in 2005 and its third fund with A$1.5 billion in 2010.

He also served a number of professional and community organizations including the Garvan Institute of Medical Research, from 2000 to 2012. He was inaugural chair of the Australian Trade Commission (Austrade), stepping down in 1993 "after almost a decade". He served as an expert on the Federal Government's Strategic Review of Health and Medical Research in 2011. He was chair of the Australian government's Innovation and Science Australia entity in 2015 Other roles have included a Member of the Harvard Business School Asia Pacific Advisory Council, and Chair of the Federal Government's Health and Hospitals Fund Advisory Board.

== Philanthropy ==
Ferris is known for his philanthropic work through the Ferris Foundation. He founded the Ferris Foundation in 1981, which has since become one of the larger philanthropic organizations in Australia. The foundation supports various initiatives, including the arts and cultural programs, environmental conservation, medical research and education.

Ferris has also personally served many organizations. He became the Chair of the Medical Research Commercialisation Fund in 2020. This is a government fund that "will provide $450 million over 10 years from 2022-23 to support innovative early stage health and medical research in Australia". He was Chair of the Garvan Institute of Medical Research and inaugural chair of the government's Innovation and Science Australia Board.

== List of works ==
- Ferris, W. D. (1993). Really Making a Difference: The Essential Anthology on Australian Export Activity 1983-1993. Gore & Osment. ISBN 978-1-875531-59-2.
- Ferris, Bill D. (2000). Nothing Ventured, Nothing Gained: Thrills and Spills in Venture Capital. Allen & Unwin. ISBN 978-1-86508-281-3.
- Ferris, Bill (2013). Inside Private Equity: Thrills, Spills and Lessons from the Author of Nothing Ventured, Nothing Gained. Allen & Unwin. ISBN 978-1-74331-329-9.

== Awards and honours ==
Ferris was made an Officer of the Order of Australia in 1990 for services to the export industry. The same year, he was Entrepreneur Champion in the Ernst & Young Entrepreneur of the Year Award. In 2008 he received the first Asian Venture Capital Journal Lifetime Achievement Award, and also the first AVCAL Lifetime Contribution Award. In 2014 he was awarded the "Leader of the Year, Asia-Pacific", in the Private Equity International Awards.

In the 2008 Australia Day Honours List, he was elevated to a Companion of the Order of Australia (AC) "for service to the community through a range of philanthropic endeavours, as a leader in support of medical research, and to business and commerce through ongoing roles supporting Australian exports, venture capital and private equity."

== Personal life ==
Ferris married Lea Trumbull on 30 November 1974, and they have one son and two daughters.

Government offices
Preceded by Office created	Chairman of the Austrade; 1986 – 17 December 1993	Succeeded by Robert Johnston
