= Alan Jackson (businessman) =

Australian business executive and director (1936–2018)

Alan Jackson AO FCA FCPA FAIM
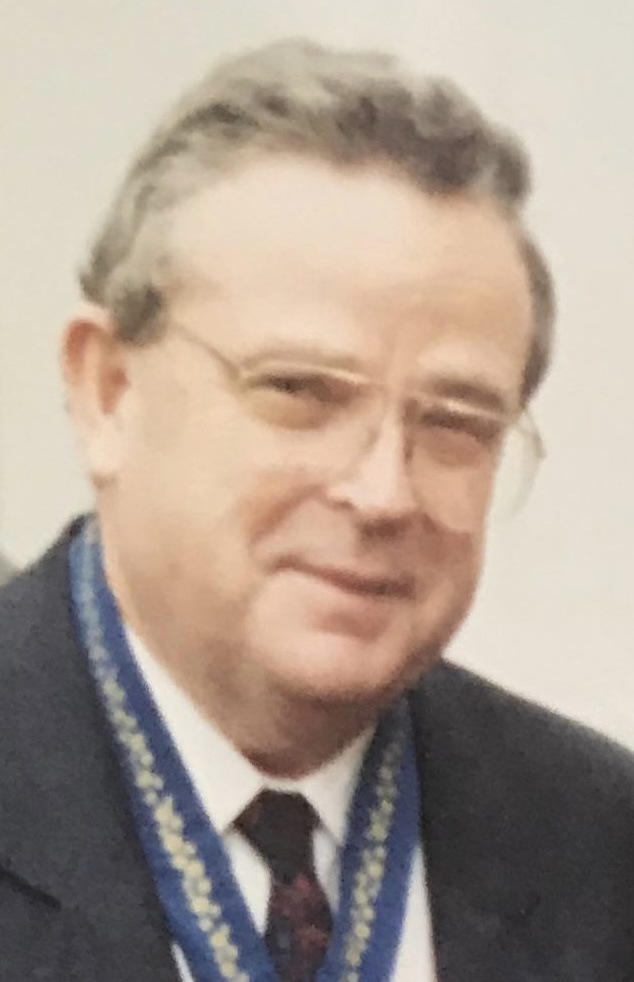
- Jackson c. 1991
- Born: Alan Robert Jackson; 30 March 1936; Drouin, Victoria, Australia
- Died: 4 August 2018 (aged 82); Malvern East, Victoria, Australia
- Resting place: Cheltenham Memorial Cemetery, Cheltenham
- Occupation: Business executive
- Office: CEO, BTR Nylex (1984–1990); CEO, BTR plc (1990–1996); Chairman, Austrade (1995–2001); Chairman, Austrim Nylex (1998–2001)
- Board member of: Reserve Bank of Australia (1991–2001); Seven Network (1995–2001)
- Relatives: Margaret Jackson (niece); Joseph Jackson (great-grandfather)
- Awards: Officer of the Order of Australia

Alan Robert Jackson (30 March 1936 – 4 August 2018) was an Australian businessman who was the CEO of BTR Nylex between 1984 and 1990 and CEO of BTR plc between 1990 and 1996 as well as Chairman of Austrade between 1995 and 2001. He was also a board member on the Reserve Bank of Australia between 1991 and 2001.

== Early life and education ==
Alan Jackson was born in Drouin but grew up in Bunyip, in the Western part of the Gippsland in Victoria.

As a child, Jackson attended Warragul High School, leaving in 1952, at the age of 15 to train to became a pastry chef but became an office boy or clerk in Melbourne instead. At 19, he took accountancy studies by correspondence at Hemmingway Robertson Institute. Jackon did not complete his High School Certificate, but did a brief management course at Harvard's Business School in 1977.

On 20 January 1962, Jackson married Esme Jackson (née Giles). The couple had four daughters together. He died on 4 August 2018 in Malvern East.

== Career ==
=== Accounting ===
Jackson began his career as a pastry chef but once he was old enough, became an office boy at Kelly and Lewis Pty Ltd in 1955, and then soon moved to Mather & Platt, in which he became a clerk. Mather & Platt was the Australian arm of a British pump manufacturer. After his studies, he progressed to become an accountant, then chief accountant and later, finance secretary and finance director. He became managing director of the company during the 1970s, until 1977.

=== Period at BTR and subsidiaries ===
Jackson became managing director and later CEO of the conveyor belt manufacturer Hopkins Odlum between 1977 and 1984 which would become the precursor to BTR Nylex when the name of Hopkins was changed in 1986 after Nylex was purchased in 1984 from the Australian Consolidated Industries (ACI). This occurred after BTR purchased Nylex in 1984 and placed Jackson as its CEO. In 1988, Jackson would eventually complete a hostile takeover of ACI, following the 1987 stock market crash.

In December 1990, Chairman of BTR, Sir Owen Green elevated Jackson from the position of CEO of Nylex to CEO of the entire BTR company. After nine months as CEO, Jackson purchased Hawker Siddeley for $2.9 billion. By 1993, Jackson controlled, through BTR over 1,500 subsidiary companies in over 60 countries. In the course of his tensure, Jackson turned the profits of BTR from $16.4 million to $764 million whilst sales grew from $115 million to $4.8 billion by 1995. In 1995, Jackson completed the acquisition of the remaining 37% of Nylex shares that were not already owned by BTR shareholders for $4.48 billion. This was one of the largest conglomerates in Australia, worth an estimated $11.8 billion at that point in time. Ultimately, under his leadership, stocks grew by 40% with the highest profits in 70 years recorded for BTR due to Jackson’s substantial amount of takeovers and strict financial reporting and planning. Jackson eventually retired from his position as CEO in February 1996.

=== Later career ===
In August 1995, Jackson was asked by the Australian Minister for Trade, Bob McMullan, to be a member of the board of Austrade. He was later invited by Tim Fischer in late 1995, to chair the commission. He served in this role for six years until July 2001. He furthered economic ties with Japan and South East Asian countries as well as reinforcing economic connections with the United Kingdom and the United States on behalf of Australia. Jackson would resign in July 2001, after leading the board for six years.

He also became a non-executive director of the Seven Network, a board member of the Reserve Bank of Australia and of Cabrini Hospital in Malvern East after leaving BTR in 1995; positions he held until 2001.

Between 1998 and 2001, Jackson became the executive chair of Austrim Nylex, following the selling of BTR’s remaining shares in Nylex, which was financially supported by Richard Pratt and Kerry Stokes. Ultimately, after nearly four years in the role, Jackson was forced to resign, citing ill health and large amounts of accumulated debt from the acquisitions he had made under the new brand of Nylex.

== Honours, awards and fellowships ==
=== Honours ===
- 1991 – Officer of the Order of Australia (AO) "For service to business, to industry and to government"
- 2001 – Centenary Medal "For outstanding service to Australia's international trade"

=== Awards ===
- 1985 – Australian Business Magazine's Businessman of the Year in Australia Award
- 1989 – Australian Business Magazine's Businessman of the Year in Australia Award
- 1993 – Fortune's European CEO of the Year Award

=== Fellowships ===
- 1970s – Fellow of the Institute of Chartered Accountants in Australia (FCA)
- 1970s – Fellow of the Australian Society of Accountants (FCPA)
- 1970s – Fellow of the Australian Institute of Management (FAIM)
- 1990s – Companion of the British Institute of Management (CBIM)

Government offices
Preceded by Roger Allen (acting)	Chairman of Austrade; 1 November 1996 – 20 July 2001	Succeeded by Ross Adler
