= Human factors in diving equipment design =

Influence of the interaction between the user and the equipment on design

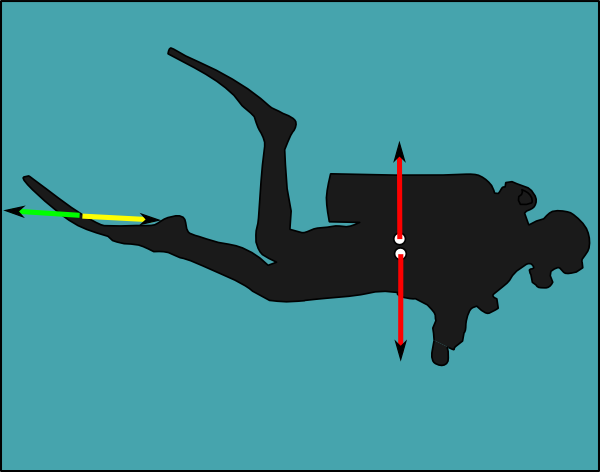
Neutrally buoyant diver with weight and centre of buoyancy aligned for level trim: The static moments of buoyancy and weight keep the diver horizontal at constant depth, and fin thrust can be aligned with direction of motion for best efficiency.

Human factors in diving equipment design is the application of human factors and ergonomics principles and data to the design of diving equipment and diving support equipment to facilitate diver-system interactions and provide for diver wellbeing and overall dive efficiency. The underwater diver relies on various items of diving and support equipment to stay alive, healthy and reasonably comfortable and to perform planned tasks during a dive.

Divers vary considerably in anthropometric dimensions, physical strength, joint flexibility, and other factors. Diving equipment should be versatile and chosen to fit the diver, the environment, and the task. How well the overall design achieves a fit between equipment and diver can strongly influence its functionality. Diving support equipment is usually shared by a wide range of divers and must work for them all. When correct operation of equipment is critical to diver safety, it is desirable that different makes and models should work similarly to facilitate rapid familiarisation with new equipment. When this is not possible, additional training for the required skills may be necessary.

The most difficult stages for recreational divers are out of water activities and transitions between the water and the surface site, such as carrying equipment on shore, exiting from water to boat and shore, swimming on the surface, and putting on equipment. Safety and reliability, adjustability to fit the individual, performance, and simplicity were rated the most important features for diving equipment by recreational divers.

The professional diver is supported by a surface team, who are available to assist with the out-of-water activities to the extent necessary, to reduce the risk associated with them to a level acceptable in terms of the governing occupational safety and health regulations and codes of practice. This tends to make professional diving more expensive, and the cost tends to be passed on to the client.

Human factors engineering (HFE), also known as human factors and ergonomics, is the application of anatomical, psychological and physiological principles to the engineering and design of equipment, procedures, processes, and systems. Primary goals of human factors engineering are to reduce human error, increase productivity and system availability, and enhance safety, health and comfort with a specific focus on the interaction between the human and equipment.

== General principles ==
Diving equipment is used to facilitate underwater activity by the diver. The primary requirements are to keep the diver alive and healthy, while secondary requirements include providing comfort and the capacity to perform required tasks. Safe operation requires correct equipment function as well as diver competence.

Fault tolerance is the property that enables a system to continue operating properly in the event of the failure of some of its components. If its operating quality decreases at all, the decrease may be proportional to the severity of the failure. Diving equipment, especially hardware elements that are high availability or safety-critical systems, must have a high fault tolerance. The ability to maintain functionality when portions of a system break down is referred to as 'graceful degradation', as opposed to a small failure causing total breakdown. The diver must also be fault tolerant, a state that is achieved by competence, situational awareness and fitness to dive, .

=== Physiological variables ===
Task loading, nitrogen narcosis, fatigue, and cold can lead to loss of concentration and focus, reducing situation awareness. Reduced situation awareness can increase the risk of a situation that should be manageable developing into an incident where damage, injury or death may occur.

A diver must be able to survive any reasonably foreseeable single equipment failure long enough to reach a place where longer-term correction can be made. The solo diver can not rely on team redundancy, and must provide all the necessary emergency equipment indicated as necessary by the risk assessment. On the other hand, a team can reduce risk to an acceptable level in most cases by distributing redundancy among its members. However, the effectiveness of this strategy is tied to team cohesion and good communication.

No gender-specific traits have been identified which require design of tasks and tools exclusively for female divers. Fit of diving suits must be tailored to suit the range of human shapes and sizes, and most other equipment fits all sizes, is adjustable to suit all sizes, or is available in several sizes. A few items are designed specifically for female use, but this is often more a fine tuning for comfort or cosmetic styling than an ergonomically functional difference. Female divers are reported, on average, to experience greater difficulty in performing five tasks of recreational diving: carrying heavy equipment on shore, putting on the scuba set, underwater orientation, underwater balance, and trim and descent. The first two are related to lifting large, heavy and bulky equipment. Balance and trim could be related to buoyancy and weight distribution, but insufficient data is available to specify a remedy.

There is a relative growth in the older sector of recreational diver demographics. Some are newcomers to the activity and others are veterans continuing a long career of diving activity. They include older female divers. More research is needed to establish the implications of age and sex-related variations on human factors and safety issues.

== Breathing apparatus ==
Graph of the breathing resistance of an open-circuit demand regulator. The area of the graph (green) is proportional to the net mechanical work of breathing for a single breathing cycle

Animation of demand valve function during the breathing cycle. A cracking pressure adjustment knob can be seen at the left side of the valve mechanism. Screwing it in increases the pre-load on the valve spring and increases the pressure difference required to pull the diaphragm in enough to open the valve.

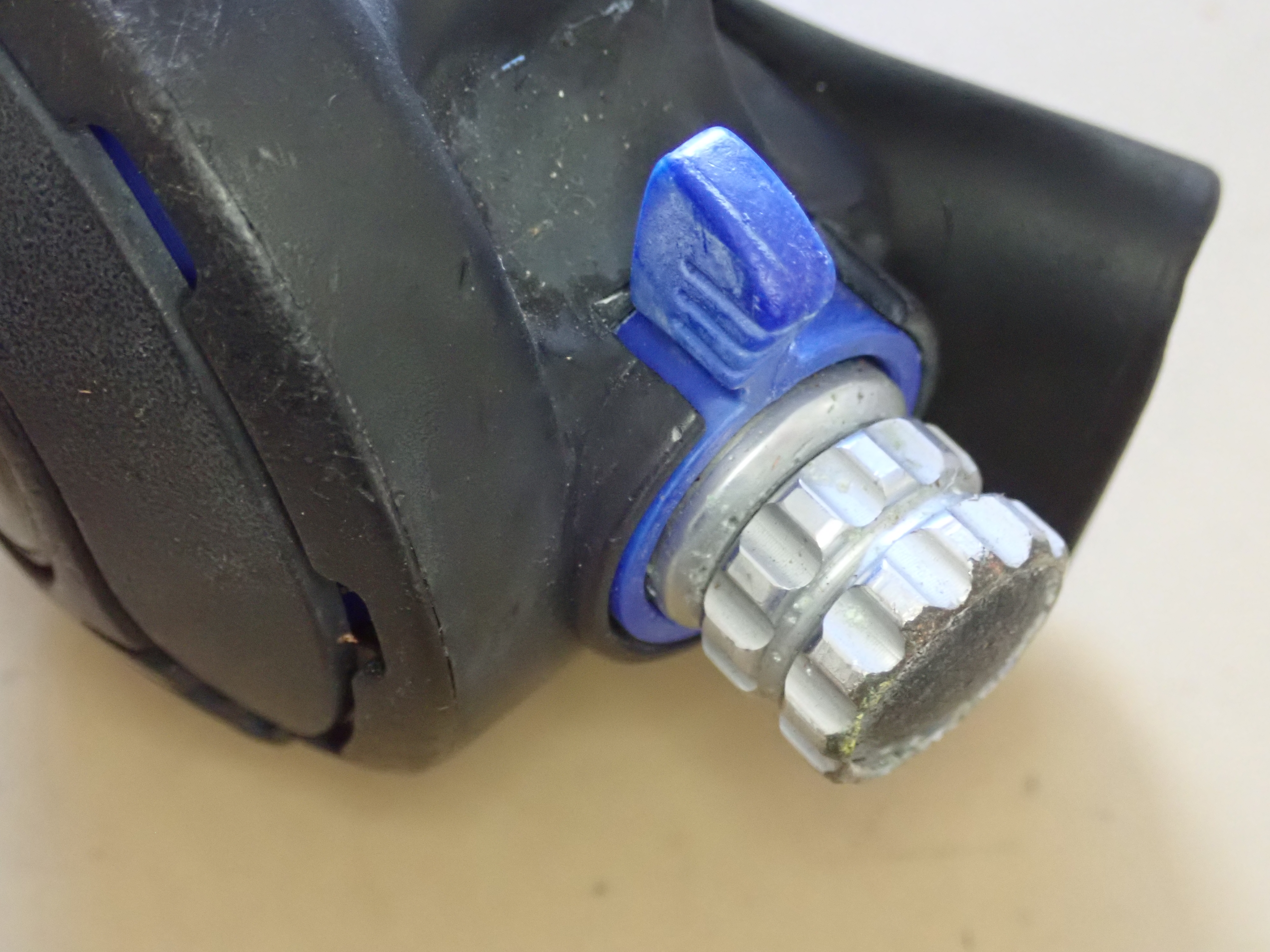
Cracking pressure adjusting knob (grooved metal) and flow deflector lever (blue plastic) on Apeks TX100 demand valve

The breathing apparatus must allow the diver to breathe with minimal added work of breathing, and minimum additional dead space. It should be comfortable to wear, and not cause stress injury or allergic reactions to its materials. It must be reliable and not require constant attention or adjustment during a dive, and performance should degrade gradually in the event of malfunctions, allowing time for corrective action to be taken with minimum risk. When more than one breathing gas mixture is available, the risk of selecting a gas unsuitable for the current depth must be minimised.

=== Demand valves ===
Holding the scuba mouthpiece between the teeth can cause jaw fatigue on a long dive. The loads that cause this fatigue can be reduced by using smaller second stages, different hose lengths and routing, angled swivels, and improved mouthpiece design, which may include customised bite grips. Allergic reactions to mouthpiece materials are less common with silicone rubber and other Hypoallergenic materials than with natural rubber, which was commonly used in older equipment. Some divers experience a gag reflex with mouthpieces that contact the roof of the mouth, but this can be corrected by fitting a different style of mouthpiece.

Purging the second stage is a useful function to clear water from the interior. The purge button should function only when pressed, and should be powerful enough to sufficiently clear the chamber while not blowing its contents down the diver's throat. Cracking pressure is the pressure difference over the diaphragm needed to open the second stage valve. This should be low but not excessively sensitive to water movement or orientation. Once open with gas flowing, the gas flow often produces a slight increase in the pressure drop in the demand valve. This helps hold the demand valve open during inhalation, effectively reducing the work of breathing, but making the regulator more susceptible to free-flow. In high performance models, the user can adjust these sensitivity settings.

The exhaust valve should offer the minimum resistance to exhalation, including a minimum opening pressure difference, and low resistance to flow through the opening. It should not easily block or leak due to foreign matter such as vomit. Exhaust gas flow should not be too distracting or annoying to the diver in a normal diving posture. Flow should be directed away from the faceplate of the mask and bubbles should not flow directly over the ears.

=== Work of breathing ===
Breathing effort should be reasonable in all diver attitudes. The diver can rotate in three axes, and may need to do so for a significant period including several breaths from any arbitrary orientation. The DV should continue to function correctly throughout the maneuvers, though some variation in breathing effort is inevitable. Breathing performance testing for compliance to standards is generally done facing forward and facing down. Manual adjustment of the inhalation valve spring may be available, and can help if an unusual orientation must be maintained for a long period.

=== Hose routing ===
Scuba divers must be able to easily provide emergency gas to other scuba divers who are diving as part of the same group, which can be made easier or more difficult by the handedness of the regulator, the hose length, and the hose routing. Different configurations are used for specific circumstances. For example, the 5 to 7 feet (1.5 to 2.1 m) "long hose" arrangement is used to facilitate gas sharing when swimming in single file through a restriction. There are hose routings that have been standardised to a reliable system.

=== Rebreathers ===
Rebreather equipment removes carbon dioxide from exhaled gas and replaces it with oxygen, allowing the diver to breathe the gas again. This can be done in a self-contained system carried by the diver, in a system where the scrubber is carried by the diver and gas is supplied from the surface, or where the gas is returned to the surface for recycling. The power to circulate gas in the loop can be the lung power of the diver, energy from the supply gas pressure, or externally powered booster pumps. Scuba rebreathers tend to circulate by lung power, and the work of breathing can make up a significant part of diver effort at depth; in extreme circumstances it may exceed the capacity of the diver without additional workload. The position of the counterlungs and the orientation of the diver in the water, can have a significant effect on work of breathing, as can the restriction of flow between the diver's teeth.

Using two scrubber canisters in series can provide a level of redundancy in that a fault in one that allows carbon dioxide breakthrough will not necessarily directly affect the other. It is also possible to repack just the first scrubber after a short dive, and may be possible to also change the order so that the freshest scrubber is last in the circuit. Mounting the counterlung across the diver between the scrubbers can eliminate transverse shifts in the centre of buoyancy during the breathing cycle, and also mounting it longitudinally in line with the lungs eliminates longitudinal buoyancy shifts during the breathing cycle. The counterlung could be mounted across the back or across the chest.

A wide variety of rebreather types are used in diving because of the highly variable requirements in different situations. A diving rebreather is safety-critical life-support equipment – some modes of failure can kill the diver without warning, some others require immediate appropriate response for survival.

Some rebreathers have control systems which will lock out if they do not complete a satisfactory pre-dive test, but others which may be used for cave diving, where the inability to start a dive may prevent the diver from exiting from a cave in which they have surfaced in a space isolated from the exit by a water-filled passage, will not prevent the diver from starting a return dive, but will warn them of the problems detected, as it may be possible to escape by operating the rebreather manually.

=== Mouthpiece retaining straps ===
Rebreather diving incidents commonly involve an inappropriate breathing gas, which can result in loss of consciousness, water aspiration and drowning. Water aspiration may be delayed by use of a full-face mask or a mouthpeice retaining strap. According to a study of military rebreather accidents, the number of fatalities was low where mouthpiece retaining straps were used. The availability of a tethered dive buddy also helped ensure timely rescue.

=== Snorkels ===
A separate snorkel, or tube snorkel, used for freediving and swimming at the surface on scuba, typically comprises a curved tube for breathing and a means of attaching the tube to the head of the wearer. The tube has an opening at the top and a mouthpiece at the bottom. Snorkels are classified by their dimensions and by their orientation and shape. The length and the inner diameter (or inner volume) of the tube are important ergonomic considerations when matching a snorkel to the requirements of its user. The orientation and shape of the tube must also be taken into account when matching a snorkel to its use while seeking to optimise ergonomic factors such as low drag through the water, airflow, water retention, interrupting the field of vision, work of breathing, and dead space. The collapsible snorkel is intended for scuba divers who do not need a snorkel on every dive, but may find it occasionally useful. It can be folded up and stored in a pocket until it is needed.

Some snorkels have a sump and drain valve at the lowest point to help clear the snorkel and drain the remnant volume of water in the snorkel out of the direct air passage. The effectiveness of these has not been clearly established. These valves have a tendency to fail if infrequently used, stored for long periods, through environmental fouling, or owing to lack of maintenance. Many also slightly increase the flow resistance of the snorkel, retain a small amount of water in the tube after clearing, or both.

=== Dead space ===
Mechanical dead space of diving breathing apparatus is the volume in which the exhaled breathing gas is immediately inhaled on the next breath, increasing the necessary tidal volume and respiratory effort to get the same amount of usable breathing gas, increasing the accumulation of carbon dioxide from shallow breaths, and limiting the maximum volume of fresh or recycled gas (Note: Recycled gas is gas that has been scrubbed of carbon dioxide and reoxygenated in a rebreather or life-support system.) in a breath. It is in effect an external extension of the physiological dead space. The importance of minimising dead space volume is greater when the work of breathing is large, as work of breathing can also be a limiting factor in gas exchange. This becomes critical at high ambient pressures when the density of the breathing gas is high. Lower density breathing gas diluents help mitigate this problem.

== Masks and helmets ==
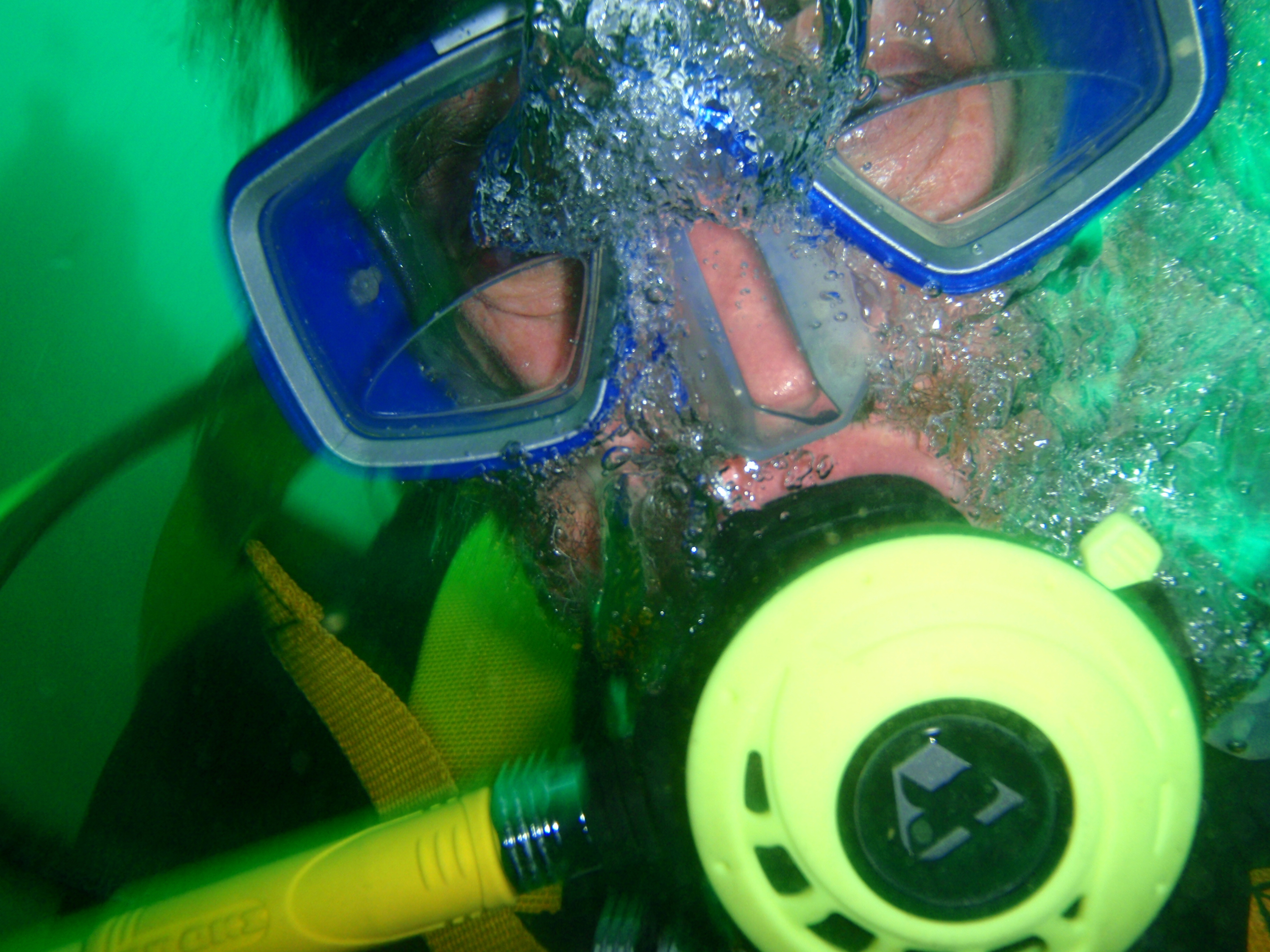
Scuba diver with bifocal lenses in half mask

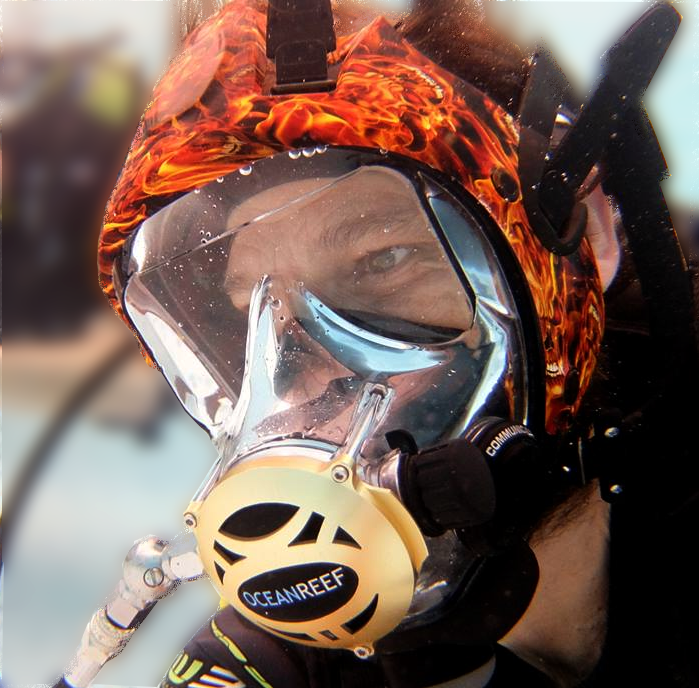
Ocean Reef full-face mask

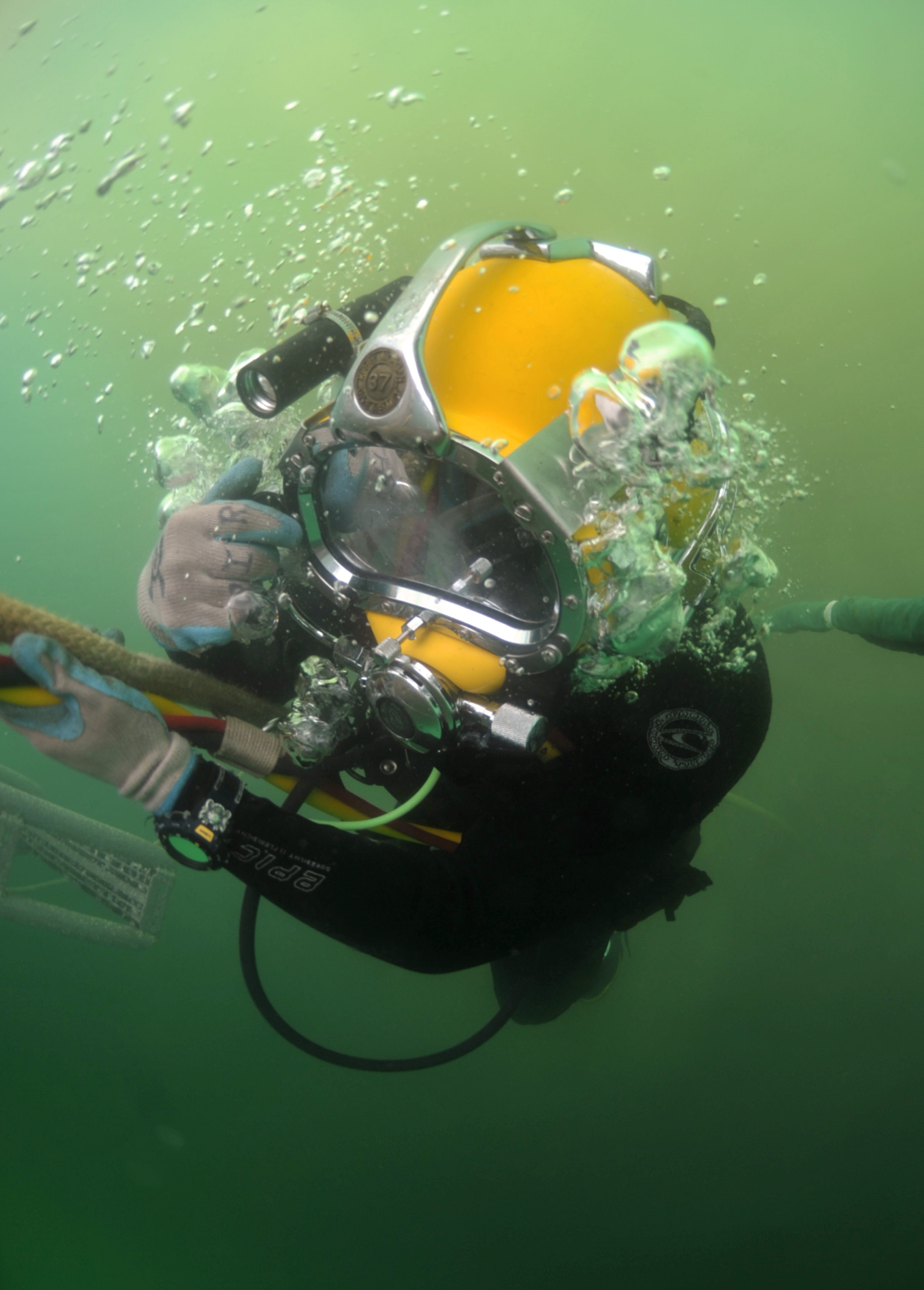
Helmeted diver descending on a shotline

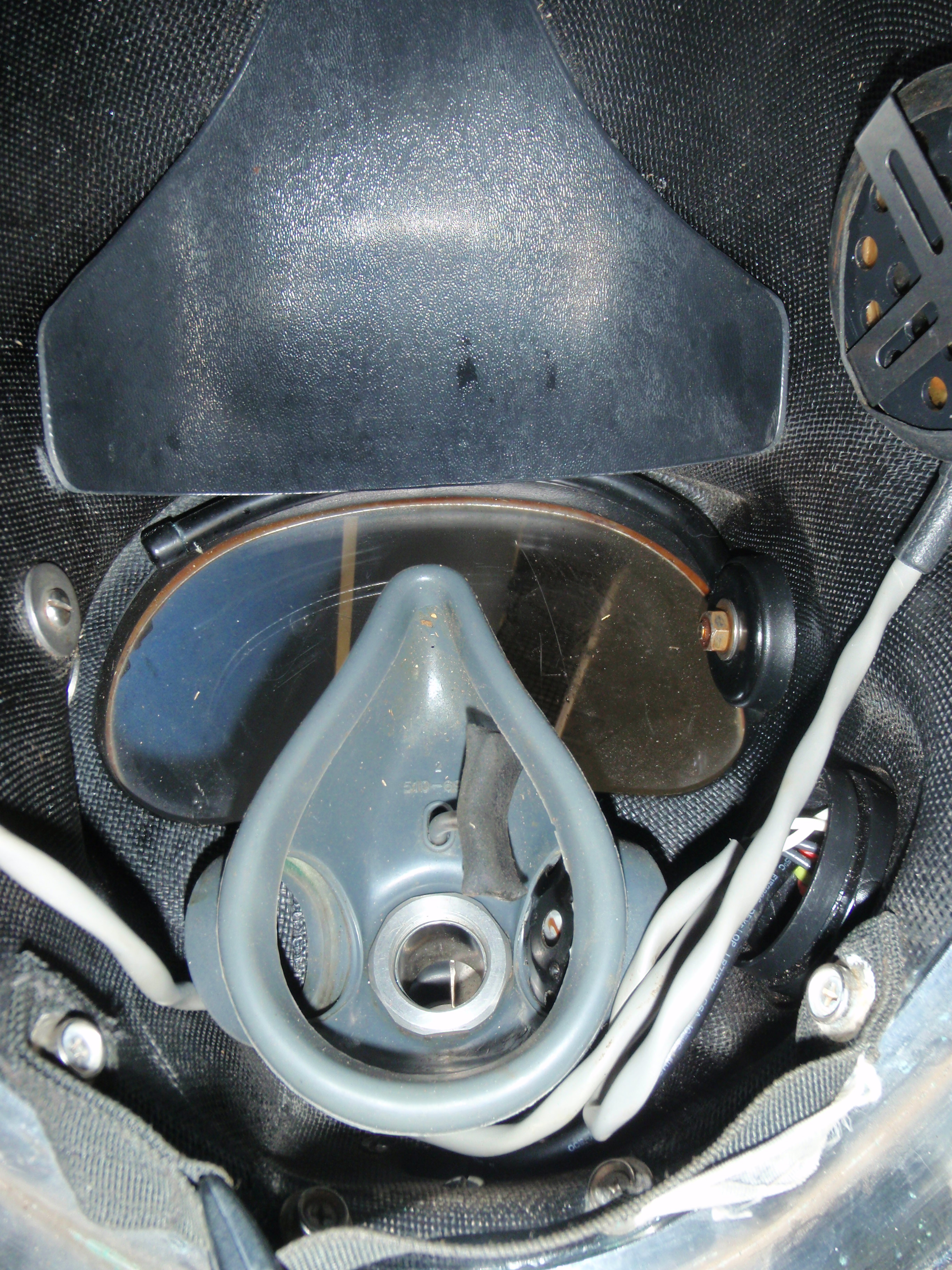
Inside view of a Kirby Morgan 37 showing the oral-nasal mask, the microphone and a loudspeaker of the communications system

Diving masks and helmets provide air space between the eyes and a transparent window to allow the diver a clear view underwater.

=== Internal volume ===
The internal volume of masks and helmets affects buoyancy and trim, and dead space, which affects gas exchange and work of breathing.

The volume of dead space is important for full-face masks and helmets, but not relevant to half masks as they are not part of the breathing passage. For breathhold diving, the mask internal volume must be equalised from the single breath in the diver's lungs, so a small volume is highly desirable, but scuba divers have sufficient air available that this is not a problem.

Large internal volume half-masks tend to float up against the nose, which is uncomfortable and becomes painful over time. The trend is towards low volumes and wide fields of vision, which requires the viewport to be close to the face. This makes it difficult to design a frame and nose pocket that will accommodate the full range of face shapes and sizes. Wide and high-bridged noses and very narrow faces are a particular problem. The clearance between the viewport and eyes should account for the eyelashes when blinking.

Full-face masks have larger internal volumes, but they are strapped on more securely and the load is carried by the neck. This load is small enough to be easily accommodated by most divers, though it may take some time to get used to it, and a lower volume is more comfortable. A large volume may adversely affect diver trim and necessitate moving or adding ballast weight to compensate.

=== Helmet buoyancy ===
The weight of a lightweight demand helmet in air is about 15 kg. Underwater it is nearly neutrally buoyant so it is not an excessive static load on the neck. The helmet is a close fit to the head and moves with the head, allowing the diver to aim the viewport using head movement to compensate for the restricted field of vision.

Free-flow helmets compensate for a potentially large dead space by a high gas flow rate, so that exhaled gas is flushed away before it can be rebreathed.

=== Seal ===
The mask must form a watertight seal around the edges to keep water out, regardless of the attitude of the diver in the water. This seal is between the elastomer skirt of the mask and the skin of the face. The fit of a mask affects the seal and comfort and must account for the variability of face shapes and sizes. For half masks, this is achieved by the very wide range of models available, but in spite of this some faces are too narrow or noses too large to fit comfortably. This is less of a problem with full-face masks and less again with helmets. However, these are affected by other factors like overall head size and neck length and circumference, so there is still a need for adjustment and different size options.

=== Equalising ===
Two aspects of equalising the pressure in gas spaces are influenced by mask and helmet design. These are equalising the internal space of the mask or helmet itself, and equalising the ears. Equalising the internal space of a half mask is normally achieved through the nose, and equalising the ears requires a method to block the nostrils. This is relatively easy to do with half-masks, where the diver can usually pinch the nostrils closed through the rubber of the mask skirt.

Helmets and most full-face masks do not allow the diver finger access to the nose, and various mechanical aids have been tried with varying levels of comfort and convenience.

=== Vision ===
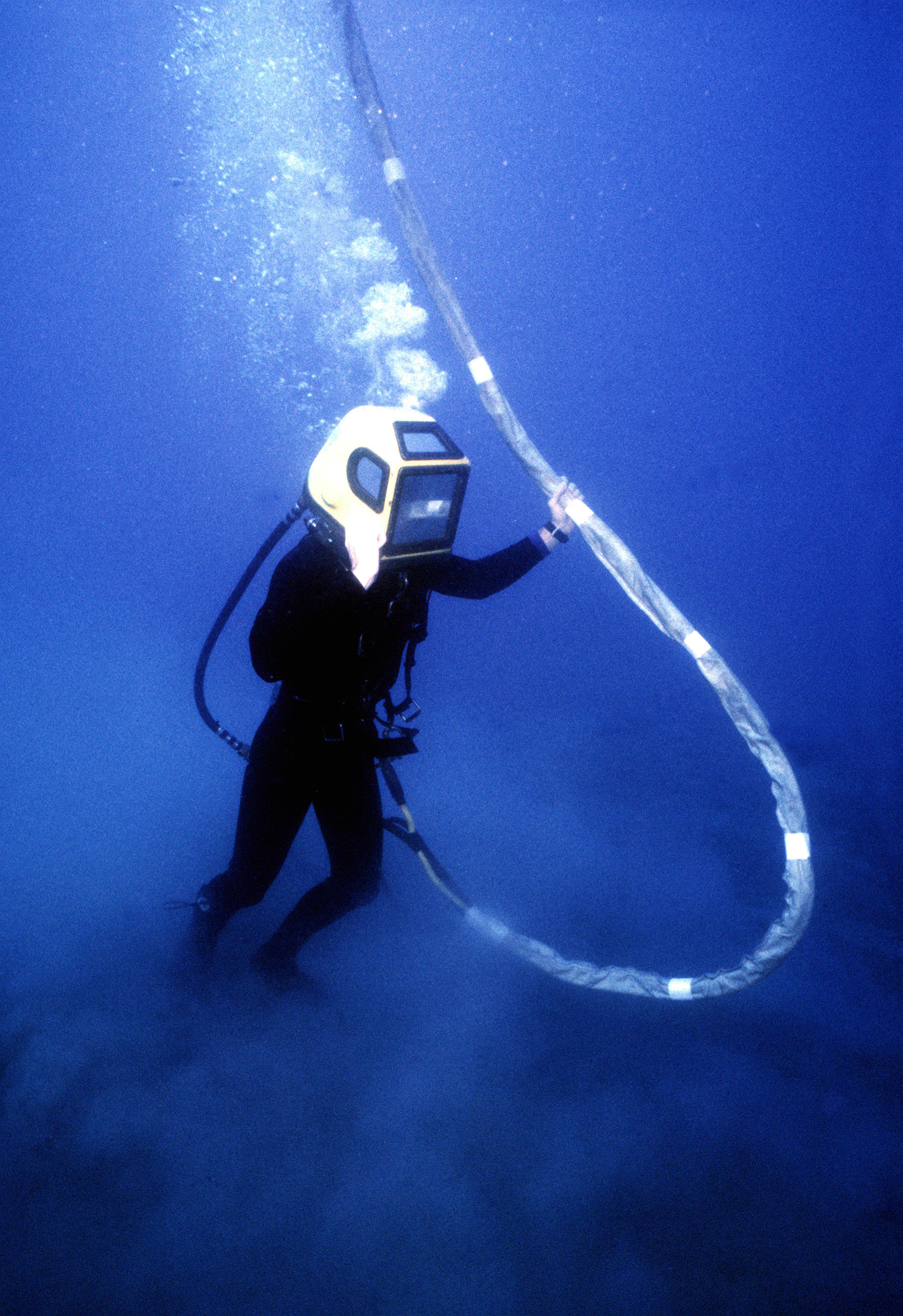
Diver using US Navy Mark 12 freeflow helmet

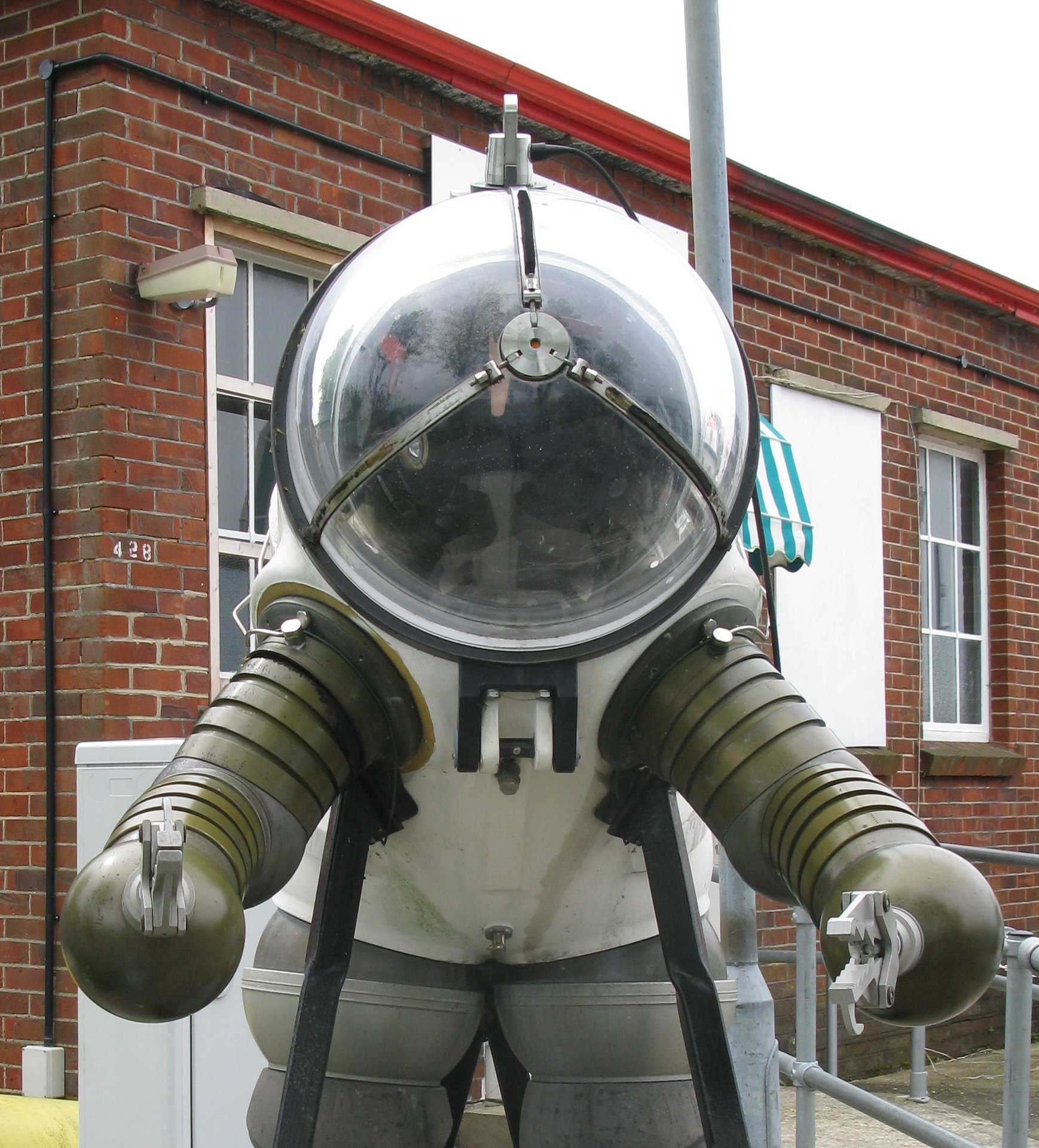
A JIM atmospheric suit with a large domed viewport

The field of vision of the diver is reduced by opaque parts of the helmet or mask. Peripheral vision is more reduced in the lower areas due to the size of the demand valve. Helmet design is a compromise between low mass and inertia (with a smaller interior volume and restricted field of vision), and large viewports that lead to a larger interior volume. A viewport close to the eyes provides a better view for the same area, but this is complicated because of the varying nose sizes of divers and the need for clearance for the oro-nasal mask. Curved viewports can introduce visual distortions that reduce the ability to judge distance, and almost all viewports are made flat. Even a flat viewport causes some distortion, but it takes relatively little time to get used to this, as it is constant. Spherical port surfaces are generally used in newer atmospheric suits for structural reasons, and work well when the interior volume is large enough. They can be made wide enough for adequate peripheral vision. Field of vision in helmets is affected by the mobility of the helmet. A helmet directly supported by the head can rotate with the head, allowing the diver to aim the viewport at the target. In this case, however, peripheral vision is constrained by the dimensions of the viewport, the weight in air and unbalanced buoyancy forces when immersed must be carried by the neck, and inertial and hydrodynamic loads must also be carried by the neck. A helmet fixed to a breastplate is supported by the torso, which can safely support much greater loads, but it cannot rotate with the head. The entire upper body must rotate to direct the field of vision. This makes it necessary to use larger viewports so the diver has an acceptable field of vision at times when rotating the body is impractical. The need to rotate the head inside the non-rotatable helmet requires internal clearance, therefore a larger volume, and consequently a greater mass of ballast.

Optical correction is another factor that is considered in mask and helmet design. Contact lenses can be worn under all types of masks and helmets. Regular spectacles can be worn in most helmets, but cannot be adjusted during the dive. Corrective lenses can be glued to the inside of half-masks and some full-face masks, but the distance from the eyes to the lenses may not be optimal, and some correction may be needed to compensate for the increased distance from the cornea to the lens. Bifocal arrangements are available, mostly for far-sightedness, and may be necessary with older divers to allow them to read their instruments. Defogging of bonded lenses is the same as for plain glass. Some dive computers have relatively large font displays, and adjustable brightness to suit the ambient lighting.

An open circuit breathing apparatus produces exhalation gas bubbles at the exhaust ports. Free-flow systems produce the largest volumes, but the outlet can be behind the viewports so it does not obscure the diver's vision. Demand systems must have the second stage diaphragm and exhaust ports at approximately the same depth as the mouth and lungs to minimise work of breathing. To get consistent breathing effort for the range of postures the diver may need to assume, this is most practicable when the exhaust ports and valves are close to the mouth, so some form of ducting is required to direct the bubbles away from the viewports of helmet or mask. This generally diverts exhaust gases around the sides of the head, where they tend to be rather noisy as the bubbles rise past the ears. Closed circuit systems vent far less gas, which can be released behind the diver, and are significantly quieter. Diffuser systems have been tried, but have not been successful for open circuit equipment, though they have been used on rebreathers, where they improve stealth characteristics.

== Cylinders ==
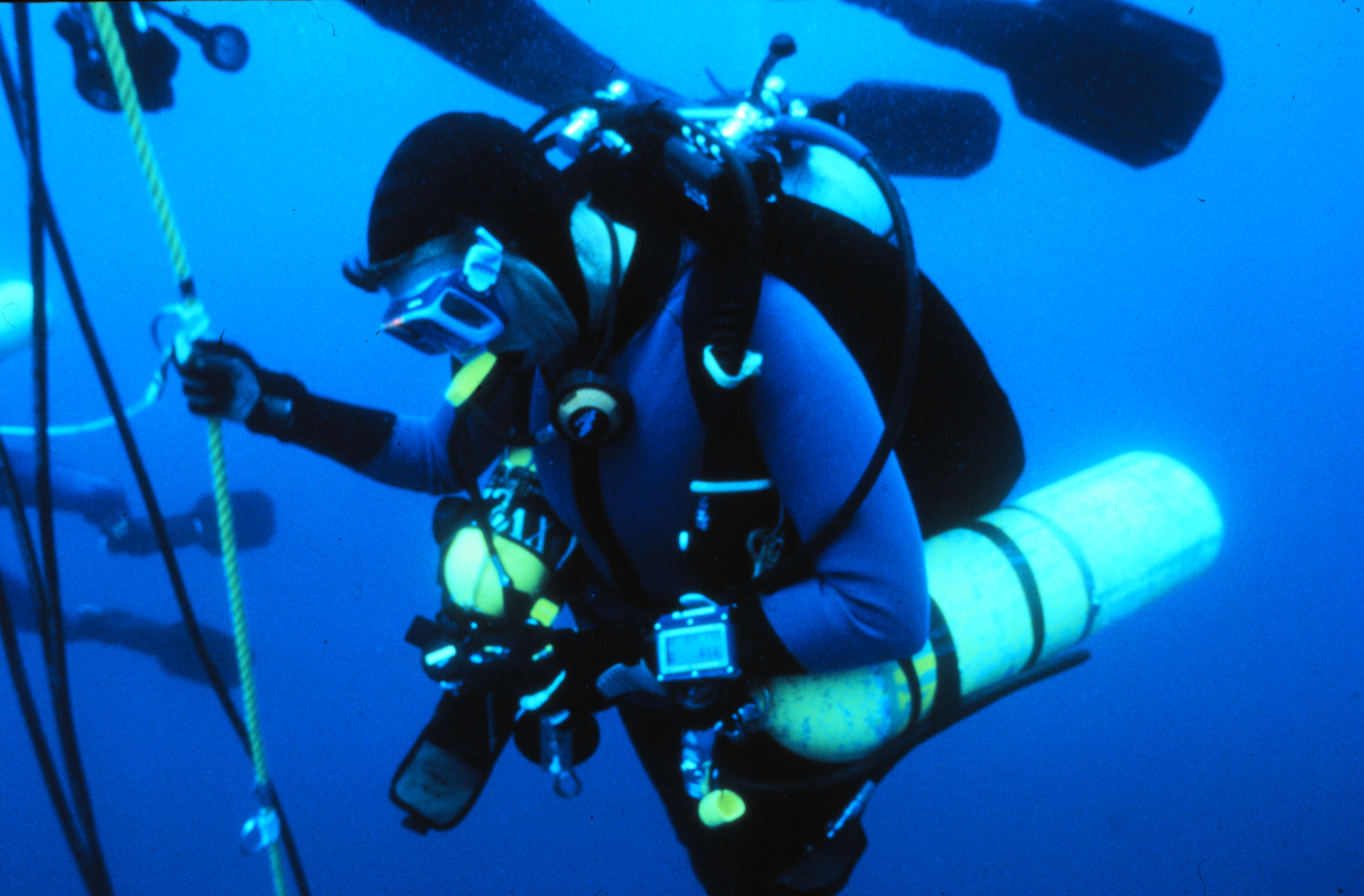
Scuba diving with back-mounted manifolded twins and sling mounted decompression gas

When using multiple gas sources and mixtures it is important to avoid confusing the gas mix in use and the pressure remaining in the various cylinders. The cylinder arrangement must allow access to cylinder valves when in the water. Use of the wrong gas for the depth can have fatal consequences with no warning. High task loading for technical divers can distract from checking the mix when switching gas. It is important to check that each cylinder is the correct gas and is mounted in the right place, to positively identify the new gas at each gas switch, and to adjust the decompression computer to allow for each change in gas for correct decompression. Some computers automatically change based on data from integrated pressure transducers, but still require correct pre-dive setting of gas mixes.

A back-mounted single-cylinder configuration is stable on the diver in and out of the water, and is compact and acceptably balanced. However, some divers have difficulty reaching the valve knob, which is behind the back, particularly when the cylinder is mounted relatively low on the harness, or the suit is thick or tight. Back-mounted twin cylinders with an isolation manifold are also stable in and out of the water. They are compact, heavy, and acceptably balanced for most divers. Some divers have difficulty reaching the valve knobs behind the back. This can be a problem in a free-flow or leak emergency, where a large volume of gas can be lost due to inability to access knobs quickly to shut down the cylinder. The weight and buoyancy distribution may be top heavy for some divers. In back-mounted independent doubles, gas is not available if a cylinder valve must be shut down. The side-mount emergency options of feather breathing and regulator swap-out are also not available. Flexible valve knob extensions on back mount sets are not very satisfactory and not very reliable, and are an additional snag risk. Pony cylinders for bailout or decompression gas clamped to the main gas supply put the valve where it cannot be seen, and may be difficult to reach. They are reasonably compact and manageable out of the water. Sling mount bailout and decompression cylinders allow easy access to the valve and allow the visual checking of labels during gas switching. Up to four sling cylinders are reasonably manageable with some practice.

=== Cylinder buoyancy ===
The material and pressure rating of cylinders affects convenience, ergonomics, and safety. Aluminum alloy and steel are the two commonly available materials that are most often used for scuba cylinders. Their strength to weight ratio allows the manufacture of scuba cylinders that are near neutral buoyancy when empty. Cylinders that require a buoyancy compensator for support when they are empty can be unsafe, since it could be necessary to ditch breathing gas to regain buoyancy in the event of a buoyancy compensator failure. Cylinders that are buoyant when full require ballasting to make them manageable underwater. This kind of cylinder is usually a fibre wound composite cylinder, which are expensive, relatively easy to damage, and usually have a shorter service life. They tend to be used for cave diving when they must be carried through a difficult route to get to the water. Buoyancy control is easier, more stable, and safer when the gas volume needed to achieve neutral buoyancy is minimised, particularly at the end of a dive during ascent and decompression. The need for a large volume of gas in the buoyancy compensator during ascent increases risk of an uncontrolled buoyant ascent during decompression.

For stage drops, sidemount diving where the cylinders will be pushed ahead of the diver for long distances, and where a cylinder may be handed off to another diver, it is particularly convenient if the cylinder has nearly neutral buoyancy during these maneuvers, as this has the least immediate impact on the buoyancy and trim of the diver. This convenience reduces task loading and improves safety.

== Diving suits ==
Diving suits are worn for protection from the environment. In most cases this is to keep the diver warm, as heat loss to water is rapid. There is a trade-off between insulation, comfort, and mobility. When diving in the presence of hazardous materials, the diving suit also serves as personal protective equipment to limit exposure to those materials.

=== Wetsuits ===
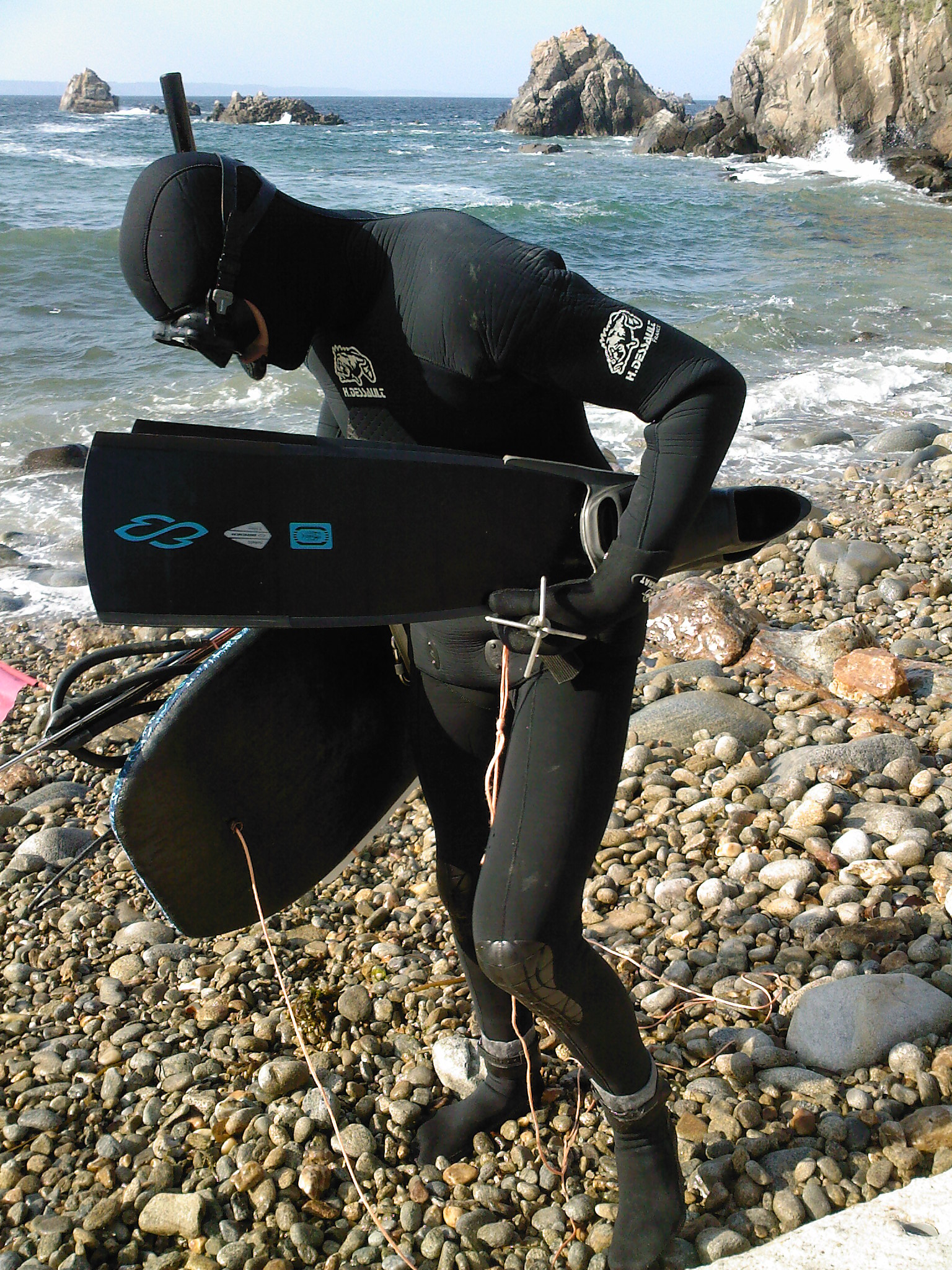
Spearfisher in wet suit

Wetsuits rely on a good fit to work effectively. They rely on the low heat conductivity of the gas bubbles in the neoprene foam of the suit, which slows heat loss. If the water inside the suit can be flushed out and replaced by cold water, this insulating function is bypassed. Movement of the diver tends to move the water in the suit around mostly where it is present in thick layers, and if this water is forced out it will be replaced by cold water from outside. A close fit reduces the thickness of the layer of water and makes it more resistant to flushing. A suit that is too tight can also cause problems. It could restrict movement and increase the diver's work of breathing. The gas bubbles in the neoprene foam will compress at depth, reducing insulation as the diver gets deeper. Semi-dry suits attempt to address this issue by making it more difficult for water to enter and leave the suit, but are still most effective when they are close-fitting.

=== Dry suits ===
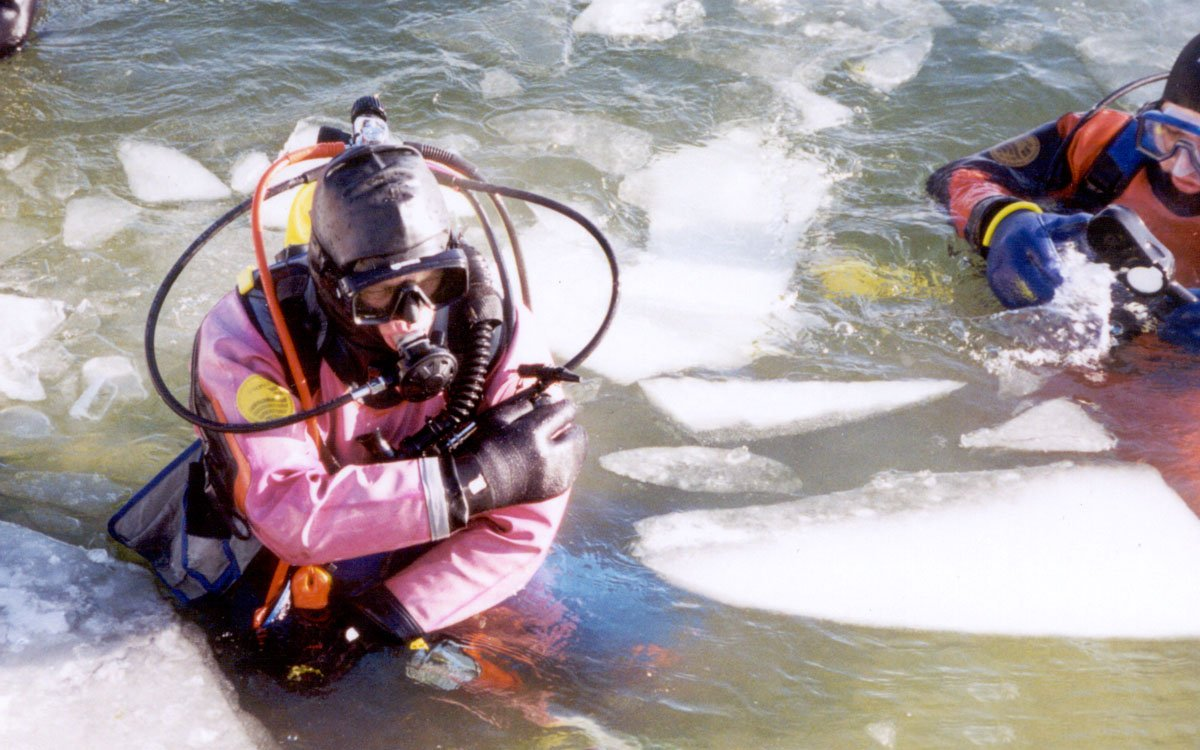
Dry suit in icy water

Dry suits rely on staying dry inside and maintaining a limited volume of gas distributed through the thermal undergarments. The volume of gas needed is fairly constant, but it expands and contracts due to pressure variations as the diver changes depth. Suit squeeze is caused by insufficient gas in the suit, and will reduce flexibility of the suit and restrict the diver's freedom of motion. This could prevent the diver from reaching critical equipment in an emergency. Gas is added manually by pressing a button to open the inflation valve, which is normally in the central chest area where it can easily be reached by both hands and is clear of the harness and buoyancy compensator. High flow rates are neither necessary nor desirable, as they could lead to over-inflation, particularly if the valve sticks open due to freezing. Over-inflation causes an uncontrollable rapid ascent if not corrected. Dumping of suit gas is only possible when the dump valve is above the gas to be dumped. During ascent, the diver has several things to monitor, so an adjustable automatic exhaust valve which provides hands-free operation helps reduce this task loading.

If the dry suit is flooded, thermal insulation is lost which may make it necessary to abort the dive. Buoyancy can also be lost, a problem that can countered by ditching ballast, inflating the buoyancy compensator if it is large enough, or deploying a DSMB or small lifting bag. The extra weight of the water can make it difficult to exit the water, but this can be mitigated by having ankle dumps or cutting the suit to allow water drainage.

The ability of the diver to reach the cylinder valve can be constrained by the suit and personal joint flexibility of the diver. Back-mount configurations with valves up are particularly difficult to reach. This can cause delays in reacting effectively to some emergencies. This is partly a suit issue and partly a cylinder configuration issue.

The combination of suit and helmet can further constrain movement. Considerable effort may be necessary to overcome the encumbrance of the suit so it can take longer to complete complex tasks, in an environment that is already non-conducive to dexterity or heavy labour. This was particularly noticeable on the standard diving suit. Wrist and neck seals are commonly available in latex rubber, silicone rubber, and expanded neoprene. Some divers are allergic to latex, and should avoid latex seals.

Dry suits can be effective for protection against exposure to a wide range of hazardous materials, and the choice of suit material should take into account its resistance to the known contaminants. Hazmat diving often requires complete isolation of the diver from the environment, necessitating the use of dry glove systems and helmets sealed directly to the suit.

The suit should allow sufficient freedom of movement to swim, work, and reach all necessary accessories and controls when worn over undergarments suitable for the water temperature, without having excess internal volume, particularly in the legs. Excess leg length and loose fit can cause the boots to float off the feet, followed by a loss of ability to swim, and orientate correctly, which can be dangerous. The seals should be tight enough to be reliable without restricting blood flow, particularly at the neck.

The operation and skill requirements for the safe use of dry suits has become fairly standardised, so although initial training is considered essential, switching between makes and models does not usually require retraining.

=== Hot water suits ===
Hot water suits are often used for deep dives when breathing mixes containing helium are used. Helium has a higher heat conductivity than air, but has a lower specific heat. The expansion of gas in the diving regulator causes intense cooling, and the chilled gas is heated to body temperature and humidified in the alveoli, which causes rapid heat loss from the body by conduction and evaporation. The amount of heat loss is proportional to the mass of gas breathed, which is proportional to ambient pressure at depth. This compounds the risk of hypothermia already present in the cold temperatures found at these depths.

Hot water suits are usually one piece suits made of foamed neoprene with a zipper on the front of the torso and on the lower part of each leg. They are similar to wetsuits in construction and appearance, but do not fit as closely by design; they are not as thick because they only need to temporarily retain and guide the flow of the heating water. The wrists and ankles of the suit must allow water to flush out of the suit as it is replenished with fresh hot water from the surface. Gloves and boots are worn which receive hot water from the ends of the arm and leg hoses. If a full-face mask is worn, the hood may be supplied by a tube at the neck of the suit. Helmets do not require heating. Breathing gas can be heated at the helmet by using a hot water shroud over the helmet inlet piping between the valve block and the regulator, which reduces heat loss to the breathing gas.

Heated water in the suit forms an active insulation barrier to heat loss, but the temperature must be regulated within fairly close limits. If the temperature falls below about 32 °C, hypothermia can result, and temperatures above 45 °C can cause burn injury to the diver. The diver may not notice a gradual change in temperature, and could enter the early stages of hypo- or hyperthermia without noticing. The suit must be loose fitting to allow unimpeded water flow, but this causes a large transient volume of water (13 to 22 litres) to be held in the suit, which can impede swimming due to the added inertia in the legs.

Hot water suits are an active heating system; they are very effective while they are working correctly, but if they fail, they are very ineffective. Loss of heated water supply for hot water suits can be a life-threatening emergency with a high risk of debilitating hypothermia. Just as an emergency backup source of breathing gas is required, a backup water heater is also an essential precaution whenever dive conditions warrant a hot water suit. If the heater fails and a backup unit cannot be immediately brought online, a diver in the coldest conditions can die within minutes. Depending on decompression obligations, bringing the diver directly to the surface could be equally deadly.

The diver will usually wear something under a hot water suit for protection against scalding, chafe and for personal hygiene, as hot water suits may be shared by divers on different shifts, and the interior of the suit may transmit fungal infections if not sufficiently cleaned. Wetsuits can prevent scalding of the parts of the body they cover, and thermal underwear can protect against chafe and keep the standby diver warm at the surface before the dive.

The hot water supply hose of the umbilical is connected to a supply manifold at the right hip of the suit, which has a set of valves to allow the diver to control flow to the front and back of the torso and the arms and legs, and to dump the supply to the environment if the water is too hot or too cold. The manifold distributes the water through the suit via perforated tubes.

Some initial training in the safe and effective use of hot water suits is considered necessary, but the skills are quickly learned and easily transferable between makes and the arrangement is fairly standard.

=== Atmospheric suits ===
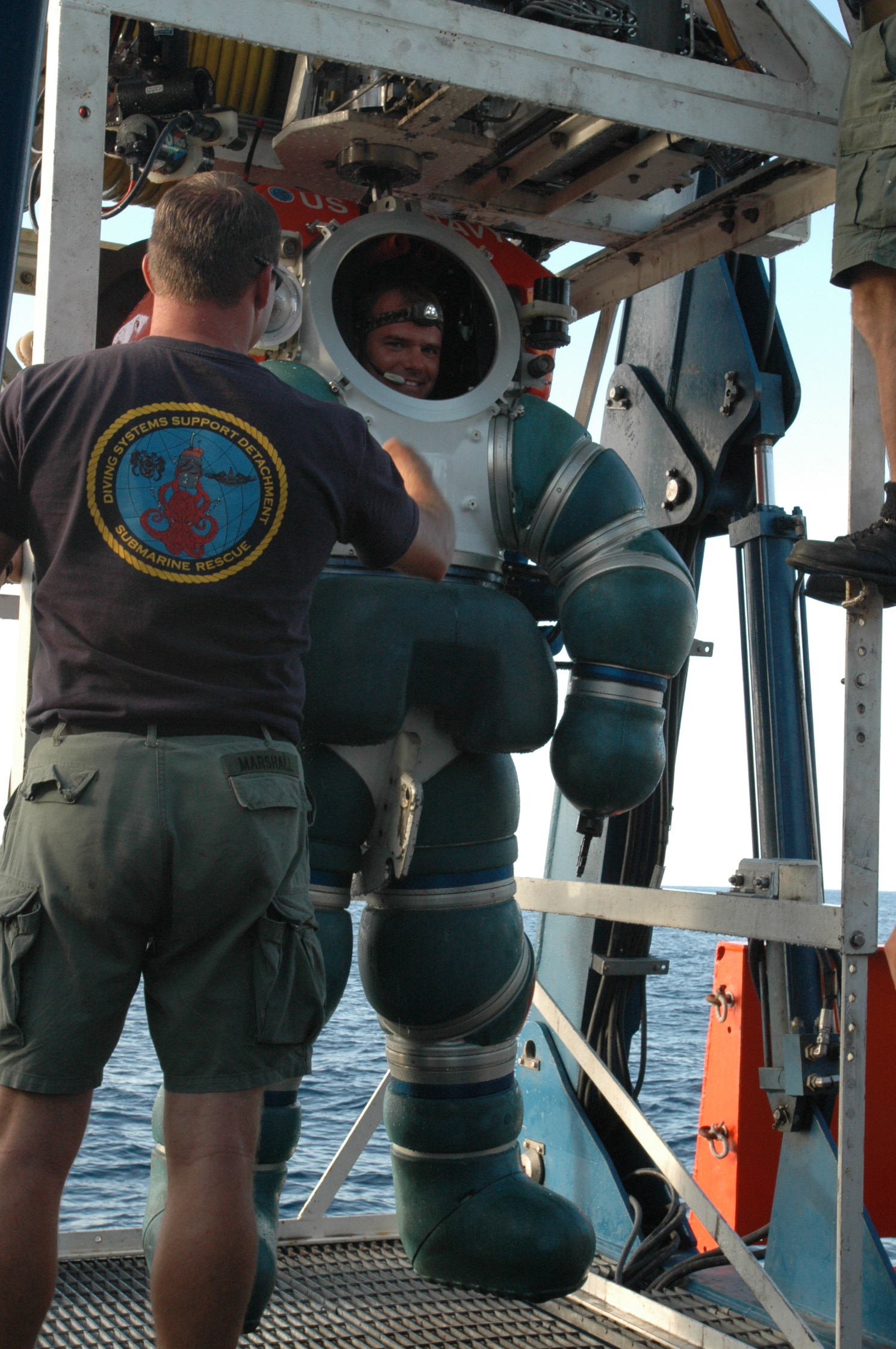
US Navy ADS 2000 on launch and recovery platform after a certification dive in August 2006.

The physiological problems of ambient pressure diving are largely eliminated by isolating the diver from the water and hydrostatic pressure in an atmospheric suit. However, dexterity problems with manipulators on atmospheric diving suits reduce their effectiveness for many tasks. The joints of atmospheric suits allow walking but are not suitable for swimming.

The suit must maintain constant volume during articulation, as a variable volume would require additional effort to move from a lower volume geometry to higher volume due to the large pressure difference. (Note: A change in volume of an atmospheric diving suit under a large external pressure is equivalent to moving a piston against the same pressure for the distance required for the same change of volume. The work done = force due to pressure over the area that moves × distance moved (W=F×d), and in this case pressure × change in volume (W=P×δV), because pressure = force over area, and volume = area × distance.) A range of user sizes can be accommodated by adding spacers between components, but the extra joints increase the likelihood of leaks. Alternative parts with different lengths that require moving high-pressure seals to be split and reconnected may need to be pressure tested before each use.

The work required to overcome friction in the pressure-resistant joint seals, inertia of the limb armour, and drag of the bulky limbs moving through the water are major constraints on agility and limit the ways the diver can move. However, buoyancy control is relatively simple, as the suit is mostly incompressible and the life support system is closed so there is no weight change due to gas consumption.

Although the pressure hull of the suit is often made from metals with high heat conductivity, insulating the diver is largely a matter of wearing clothing suitable for the internal air temperature, and insulating the shell away from the moving parts of joints is fairly straightforward. The air is recycled through the scrubber, which will heat it slightly through the exothermic chemical reaction that removes carbon dioxide.

The helmet is rigidly connected to the torso of the suit, which limits the field of vision. This can be partly compensated by using a nearly hemispherical dome viewport.

== Harness ==
The surface-supplied diver's harness is an item of strong webbing, and sometimes cloth, which is fastened around a diver over the exposure suit. It must allow the diver to be lifted without risk of falling out of the harness. It also provides support for the bailout gas cylinder, and may carry the ballast weights, a buoyancy compensator, the cutting tool, and other equipment. Several types are in use. Recreational scuba harnesses are mainly used to support the gas cylinders, buoyancy compensator and often the weights and small accessories, but are not normally required to function as a lifting harness. In professional diving, when the harness may also be used to lift the diver, it must be strong enough to support the diver and equipment without causing injury. Some discomfort is considered acceptable when lifting out of the water, as this is an emergency procedure.

Improper distribution of weight carried by the harness can cause discomfort and nerve pressure injury out of the water, and the weight of the harness including cylinders can be problematic for putting the set on for some divers.

== Buoyancy control equipment ==
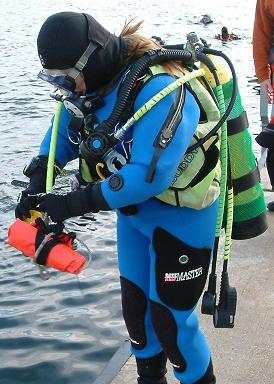
Stabiliser jacket buoyancy compensator and neoprene dry suit

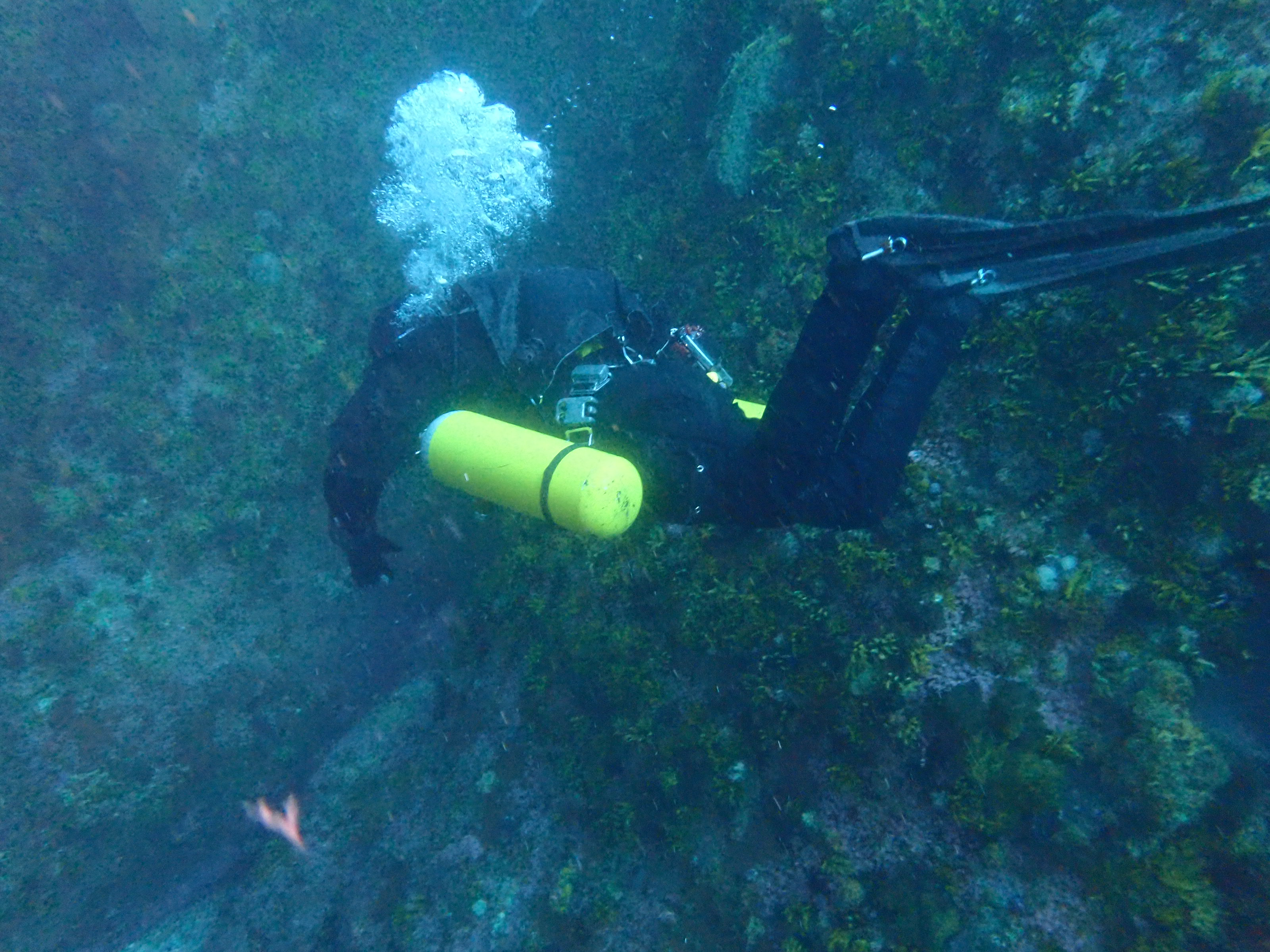
Sidemount diver with back inflation BCD

Because pressure varies rapidly with depth, buoyancy is inherently unstable and controlling it requires continuous monitoring and input from the diver. The instability is proportional to the volume of the gas required for neutral buoyancy, so the volume of gas required for neutral buoyancy should be kept as low as possible over the course of the dive.

Most of the weight change in a dive is due to gas use. Unless equipment is lost or abandoned, the maximum weight change is the consumption of all the gas in all the cylinders carried. The diver needs enough buoyancy volume to remain comfortably afloat before the dive starts. At the end of the dive there will be more buoyancy in reserve as a result of the gas consumption. However, too much reserve volume in the buoyancy compensator has the potential for contributing to an uncontrolled buoyant ascent.

In dry suits, gas is primarily intended for thermal insulation, and the additional buoyancy it creates is undesirable. Removing excess gas is only possible when there is an upward path from the gas to the venting point. Automatic dump valve position is conventionally on the upper left sleeve, clear of the harness, but in easy reach of the diver at all times and at a natural high point for the most useful and likely trim positions for swimming, work, and particularly ascents. The gas will expand as a diver ascends, increasing the need to vent it. However, a body orientation that allows for sufficient venting during an ascent is inefficient for horizontal propulsion. On the other hand, maintaining an orientation with the feet kept higher means the diver loses the ability to vent and risks losing control of buoyancy. Ankle venting points can mitigate this, but they are not fitted as standard equipment as they have proven to be a common leak point. Diving suits should not be excessively baggy, to reduce the amount of trapped gas, but must be loose enough to allow freedom of movement and access for the feet to the boots. The problem can be exacerbated if the legs are baggy at the ankles and the boots are loose, as if they slip off the feet, all control of the fins, and transfer of power to the fins, is lost. Gaiters and ankle straps can reduce the volume of this part of a suit, and may also reduce hydrodynamic drag, while ankle weights require acceleration with every fin stroke.

Female divers are reported to have more difficulties with buoyancy and trim. This may be a consequence of a buoyancy distribution not well catered for by most harness, buoyancy compensator and weighting systems, possibly exacerbated by dry suit buoyancy distribution. Many manage with available equipment, but it may take longer to learn to effectively use less ergonomically matched equipment. A similar problem is reported with unusually small divers.

The operating skills for most types of single bladder buoyancy compensator are standardised and portable between models. Familiarisation is rapid and straightforward, and retraining is generally not required, though additional training is provided for adapting to sidemount because of the associated changes in breathing apparatus management. Twin bladder units require more adaptation of procedures, and are associated with more accidents due to human error, as there are more kinds of operator errors that can be made.

== Weights ==
Weighting systems are needed to compensate for the buoyancy of the diver and buoyant equipment. The distribution of buoyancy and ballast affect diver trim, which influences propulsion efficiency breathing gas consumption.

Weight-belts of conventional design are fastened around the waist and load the lower back when the diver is trimmed horizontal. This can cause lower back pain, particularly when the weights are heavy to compensate for the buoyancy of a dry suit with thick undergarments. Weights supported by the harness distribute the load more evenly.

Ankle weights, used to improve trim, add inertia to the feet, which must be accelerated and decelerated with every fin stroke, requiring additional power input for finning and reducing propulsive efficiency. The ability to shed ballast weight is considered a safety feature for scuba diving. It allows the diver to achieve positive buoyancy in an emergency, but the inadvertent loss of ballast when the diver needs to control ascent rate is itself an emergency that can cause decompression illness.

The need to pull weights clear of other equipment when ditching in some orientations is additional task loading in an emergency. The weight belt can become caught in the harness and compound the diver's problems if the need to establish positive buoyancy is urgent.

== Fins ==
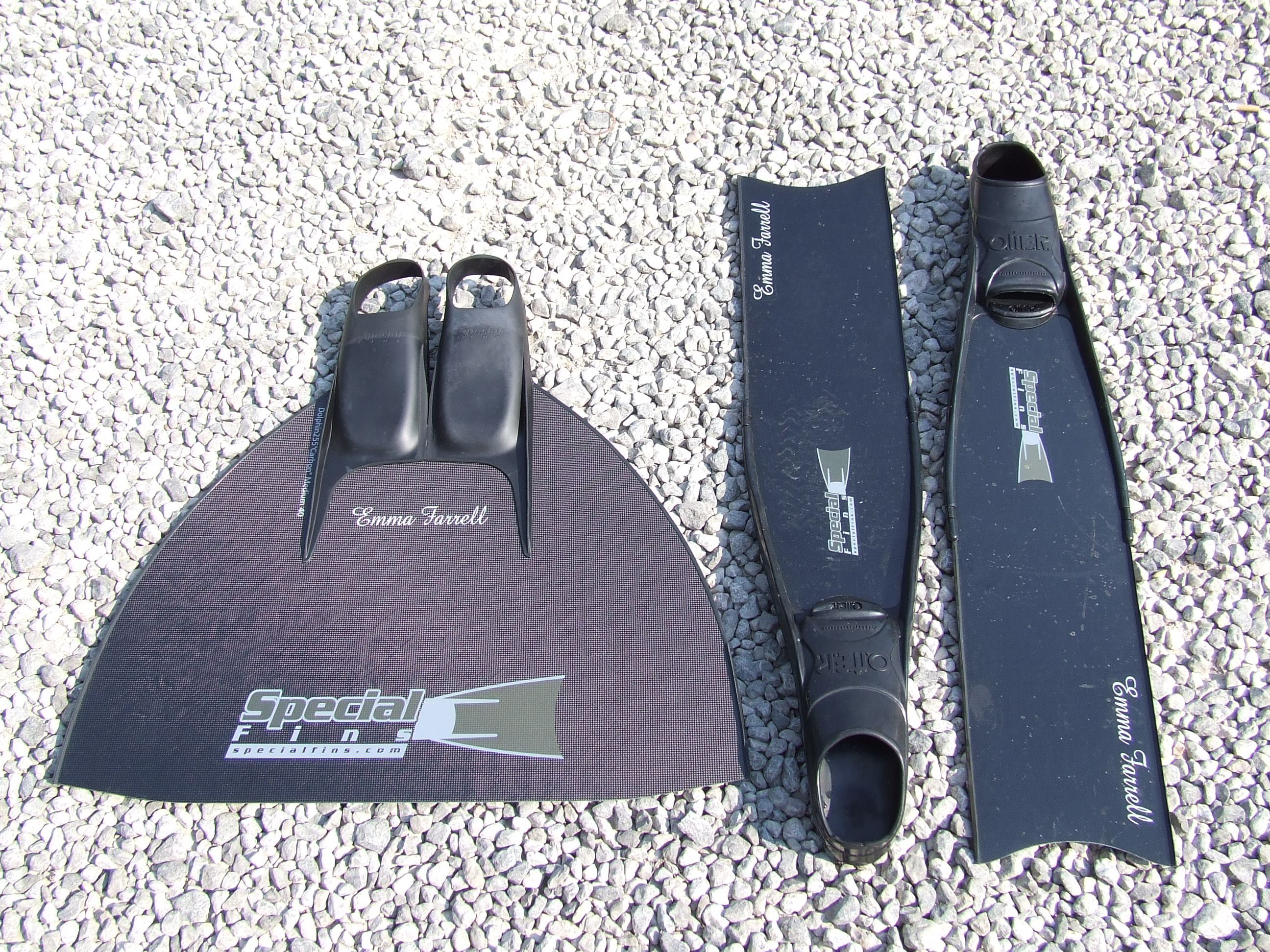
Monofin and pair of closed heel freediving bifins

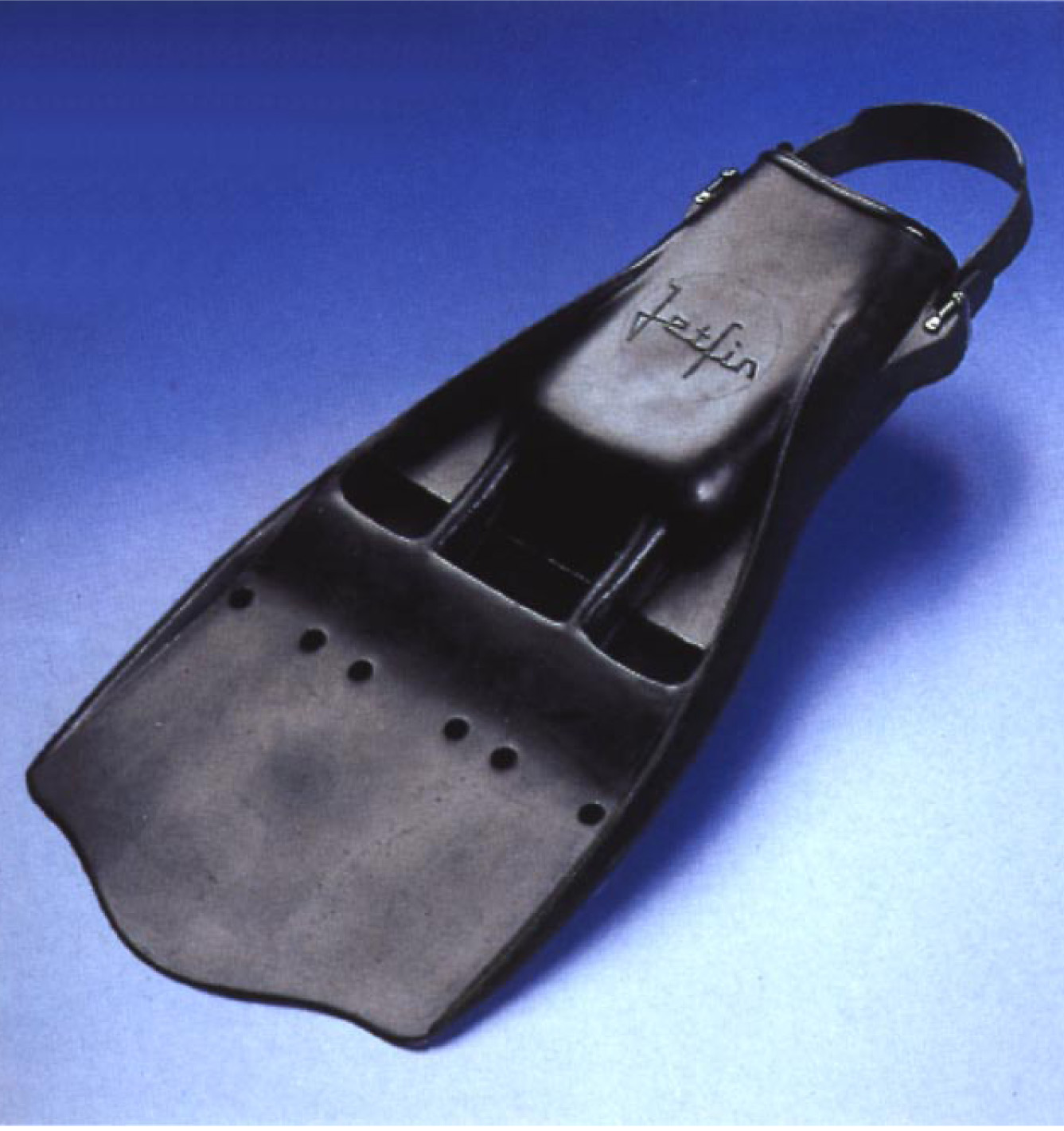
An open-heel vented paddle Jetfin

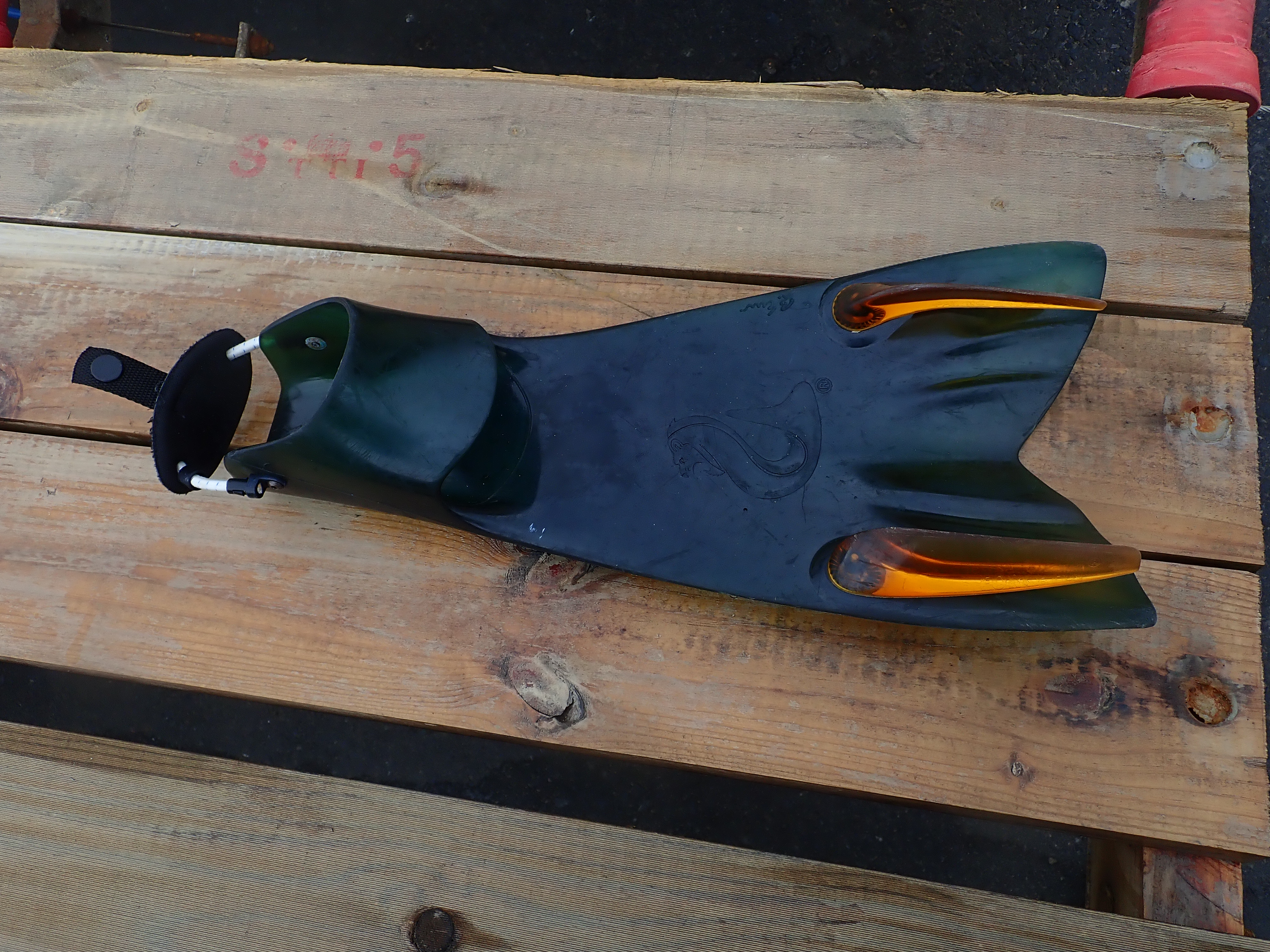
Fin design intended to reduce fatigue

Fin design is a compromise between propulsive efficiency and maneuverability. Monofins are the equipment of choice for deep apnea diving and for speed and endurance competitions. Breath hold spearfishers need more maneuverability while retaining the best reasonably practicable efficiency, and they mostly choose long bifins. Professional and recreational scuba and surface-supplied divers will sacrifice more efficiency for better maneuverability. Comfort issues and muscle or joint stress, particularly among less physically fit divers, may bias the choice towards softer fins that produce less thrust and maneuverability. Divers needing maximum maneuverability will usually choose stiff paddle fins which can be effective for reversing out of a tight spot but are inefficient for cruising using flutter kick. These fins work well with the frog kick, which is also less likely to shed vortices downward and disturb silty bottoms, so this style of fin is popular for cave and wreck penetration diving.

Experimental work suggests that larger fin blades are more efficient in converting diver effort to thrust, and are more economical in breathing gas for similar propulsive effect. Larger fins were perceived by the participating divers to be less fatiguing than smaller fins. For each kick stroke the mass of the fin must be accelerated once in each direction, so producing more thrust per stroke will waste less work on accelerations. Inertial effects increasing the work of finning are also caused by heavier fins, boots and ankle weights.

Attachment to the foot follows two basic options: an integral foot pocket enclosing the heel or an open heeled foot pocket with an elastic heel strap. Both systems allow full mobility of the ankle joint for bi-fins, but limit the motion for monofins. Full foot-pockets are softer and more comfortable on bare feet, and spread the loads more evenly, but are often unsuited to wearing over a thick or hard-soled boot capable of crossing rough rocky shores. Fin retainers may be necessary for security if the fit is loose. Open heel foot pockets can be matched with foot width when wearing a boot, and the heel-strap is selected or adjusted to fit. Fin straps may be of fixed or adjustable length. Fixed length straps are always the right length for a single user, and have fewer snag points, moving parts, and other components that can fail. Adjustable straps are quickly adaptable to the feet of different users, a major advantage for rental equipment.

== Gloves ==
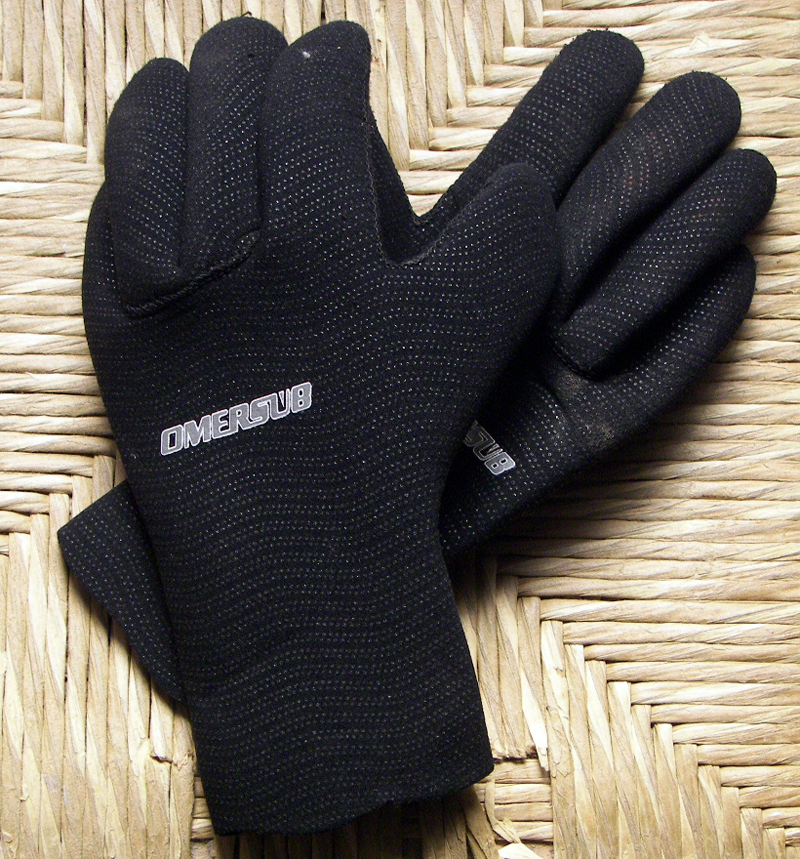
Neoprene wetsuit gloves

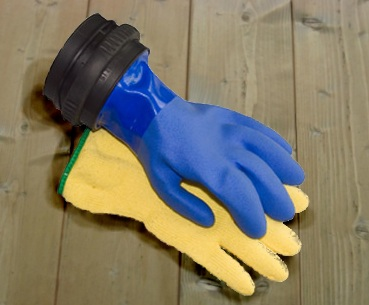
Dry glove with attachment ring and liner

Glove fit is important for several reasons. Gloves that are too tight or thick restrict movement and require more effort to grip, which causes early fatigue. Reduced blood flow may cause cramping. Loose gloves may be ineffective against heat loss due to flushing, and may reduce dexterity due to excess bulk.

There is a conflict between insulation and dexterity, and the reduction of tactile sense, grip strength, and early fatigue due to thick gloves or chilled hands. The diver can tolerate greater heat loss through the hands if the rest of the diver is warm, but in some cases such as diving in near-freezing water or where the air temperature at the surface is below freezing, the risk of frostbite or non-freezing cold injury necessitates the use of gloves most of the time. For safety-critical equipment, dexterity can be the difference between managing a problem adequately, or a situation deteriorating beyond recovery. Simple, large control interfaces such as oversize knobs and buttons, large clips, and tools that can be gripped by a heavily gloved hand can reduce risk significantly.

In very cold water there are two problems causing loss of dexterity. The chilling of hands and fingers directly causes loss of feeling and strength of the hands, and thick gloves needed to reduce chilling also reduce the sensitivity of the fingertips, making it more difficult to feel what the fingers are doing. Thick gloves also make the fingertips wider and thicker and a poorer fit to components designed to be used by gloveless hands. This is less of a problem with gloves where the fingertips have a reduced thickness of cover over the contact surface, but few neoprene gloves have this feature. The fingertips of the thumbs and forefingers are most affected, and also wear out faster than the rest of the glove. Some divers wear a thinner, tougher, work glove under the neoprene insulating glove, and cut the tips off the thumbs and forefingers of the neoprene gloves to expose the inner gloves as a workable compromise. Dry gloves allow the diver to tailor the inner insulating glove to suit the task. Insulation can be thicker where it affects dexterity least, and thinner where more sensitivity is needed.

Long term grip strength is reduced by fatigue. If the glove requires effort to close the hand to hold an object, this will eventually tire the hand, and grip will weaken sooner than when affected by cold alone. This is mitigated by gloves with a preform to fit a partly closed hand, and by more flexible glove materials.

== Surface-supplied gas panels ==
Breathing gas supplied to divers from the surface is routed through a surface control manifold and the gas panel, and may also pass through a manifold in an open or closed diving bell. The surface gas panel may be operated by the diving supervisor or a designated gas man, and the bell panel is the responsibility of the bellman. The gas panels are arranged so that it is clear to the operator which valves and gauges serve each diver. The surface standby diver may be supplied from an independent panel with independent gas supplies, so the standby diver is isolated from gas supply problems that may affect the working divers. Gas panels may be integrated with voice communication equipment.

The gas panel should monitor the depth of each diver in order to provide the right supply pressure. This is done using the pneumofathometer gauge for each diver. It should control the flow rate for free-flow helmets, monitor the supply pressure of connected gasses, make it clear which supply is in use when changing between main and secondary, and confirm that the gas is breathable at the current depth of each diver. Additionally, it should display which part of the system is supplying which diver. Safe and reliable gas provision to the divers depends on the panel operator having a clear and accurate knowledge of the status of the valves and pressures at the panel. This is helped by arranging the components of the panel so that it is immediately obvious which components are dedicated to each diver, what the function of each component is, and the status of each valve. Quarter turn ball valves are generally used because it is immediately obvious from the handle position whether they are open or closed. The spatial arrangement of valves and gauges on the panel is usually either the same for each diver, or mirrored. All operable valves and gauges should be labeled, and colour or shape coding may be useful.

== Communication systems ==
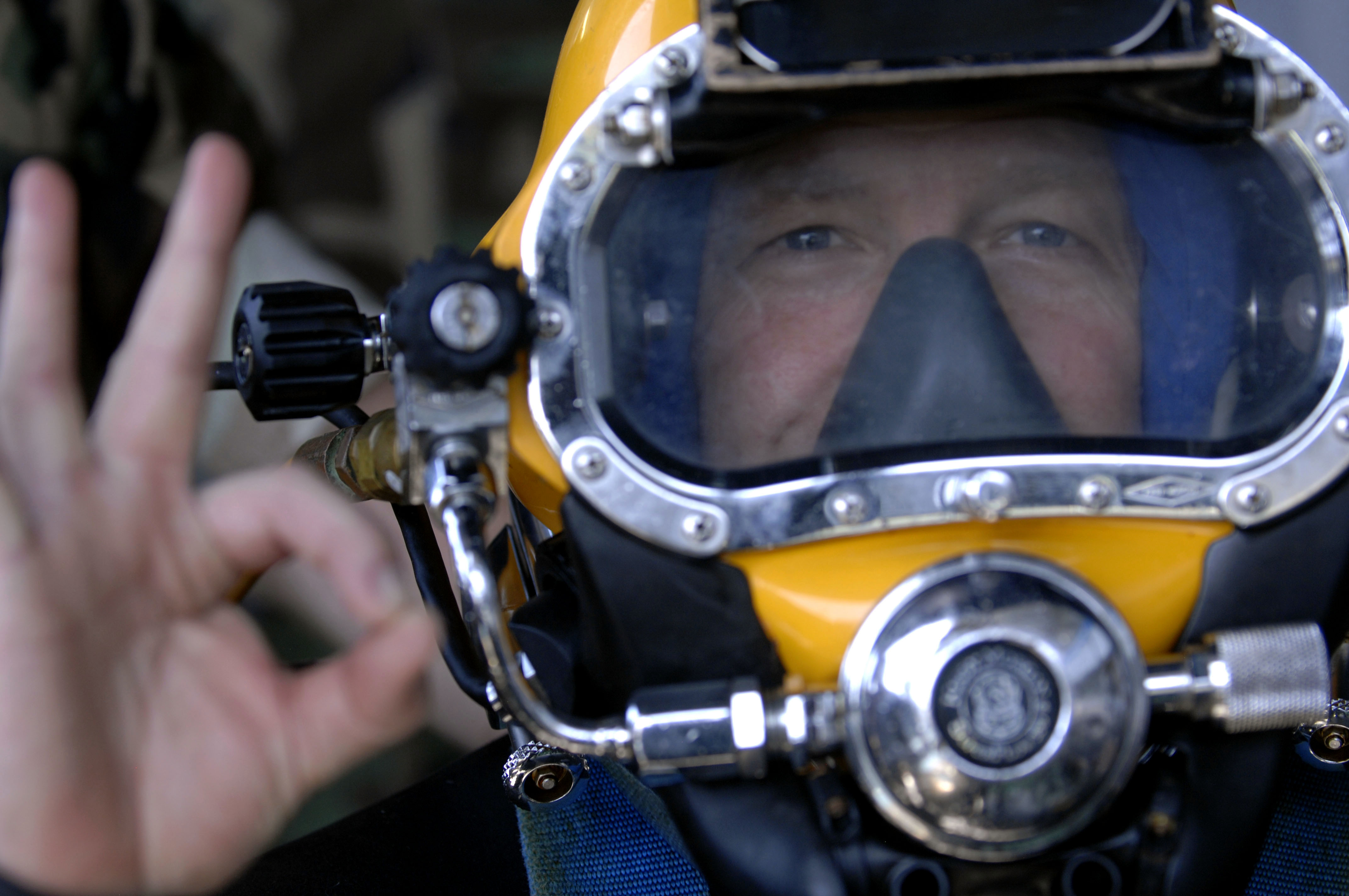
The hand signal "OK"

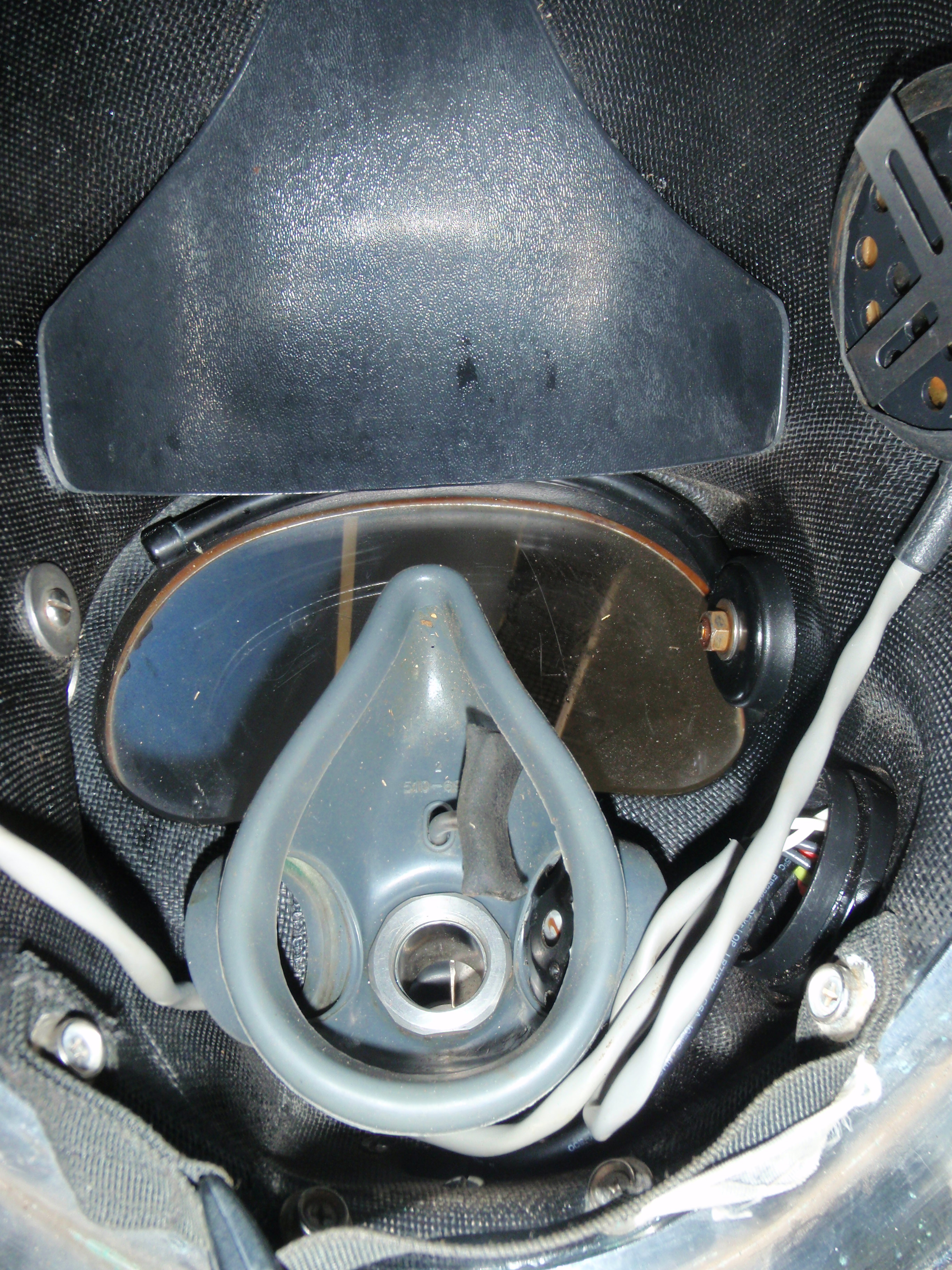
Inside a Kirby Morgan 37 helmet showing the microphone in the oro-nasal mask, and one of the speakers at the top of the photo.

Diver communications are the methods used by divers to communicate with each other or with surface members of the dive team. In professional diving, diver communication is usually voice communications between a single working diver and the diving supervisor at the surface control point, and with the bell for bell operations. This is considered important both for managing the diving work, and as a safety measure for monitoring the condition of the diver. The traditional method of communication by line signals is now used in emergencies when voice communications have failed. Surface supplied divers also often carry a closed circuit video camera on the helmet which allows the surface team to see what the diver is doing and to be involved in inspection tasks. This can also be used to transmit hand signals to the surface if voice communications fails. Underwater slates may be used to write text messages which can be shown to other divers, Voice communication is the most generally useful format underwater, as visual forms are more affected by visibility, and written communication and signing are relatively slow and restricted by diving equipment.

Diver voice communication equipment does not work with a standard scuba demand valve mouthpiece, so scuba divers generally use hand signals are when visibility allows, and there are a range of commonly used signals, with some variations. These signals are often also used by professional divers to communicate with other divers. There is also a range of other special purpose non-verbal signals, mostly used for safety and emergency communications.

The interface between air and water is an effective barrier to direct sound transmission, and the natural water surface is a barrier to visual communication across the interface due to internal reflection. Hyperbaric speech distortion also hinders sound-based communication.

The process of talking underwater is influenced by the internal geometry of the life support equipment and constraints on the communications systems as well as the physical and physiological influences of the environment on the processes of speaking and vocal sound production. The use of breathing gases under pressure or containing helium causes problems in intelligibility of diver speech due to distortion caused by the different speed of sound in the gas and the different density of the gas compared to air at surface pressure. These parameters induce changes in the vocal tract formants, which affect the timbre, and a slight change of pitch. Several studies indicate that the loss in intelligibility is mainly due to the change in the formants.

The difference in density of the breathing gas causes a non-linear shift of low-pitch vocal resonance, due to resonance shifts in the vocal cavities, giving a nasal effect, and a linear shift of vocal resonances which is a function of the velocity of sound in the gas, known as the Donald Duck effect. Another effect of higher density is the relative increase in intensity of voiced sounds relative to unvoiced sounds. The contrast between closed and open voiced sounds and the contrast between voiced consonants and adjacent vowels decrease with increased pressure. Change of the speed of sound is relatively large in relation to depth increase at shallower depths, but this effect reduces as the pressure increases, and at greater depths a change in depth makes a smaller difference.

Helium speech unscramblers are a partial technical solution. They improve intelligibility of transmitted speech to surface personnel.

== Instrumentation and displays ==
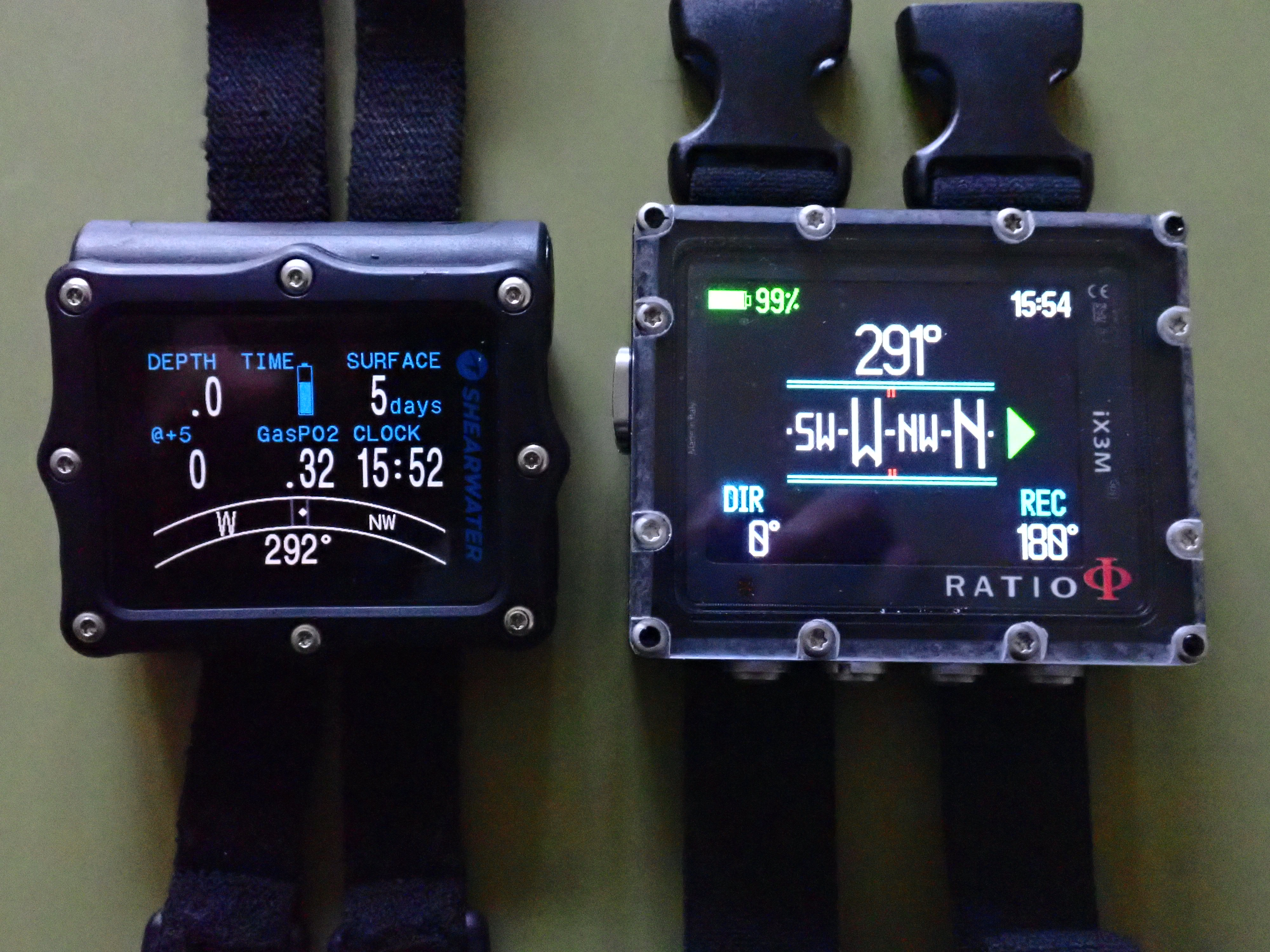
Shearwater Perdix and Ratio iX3M GPS dive computers in compass mode

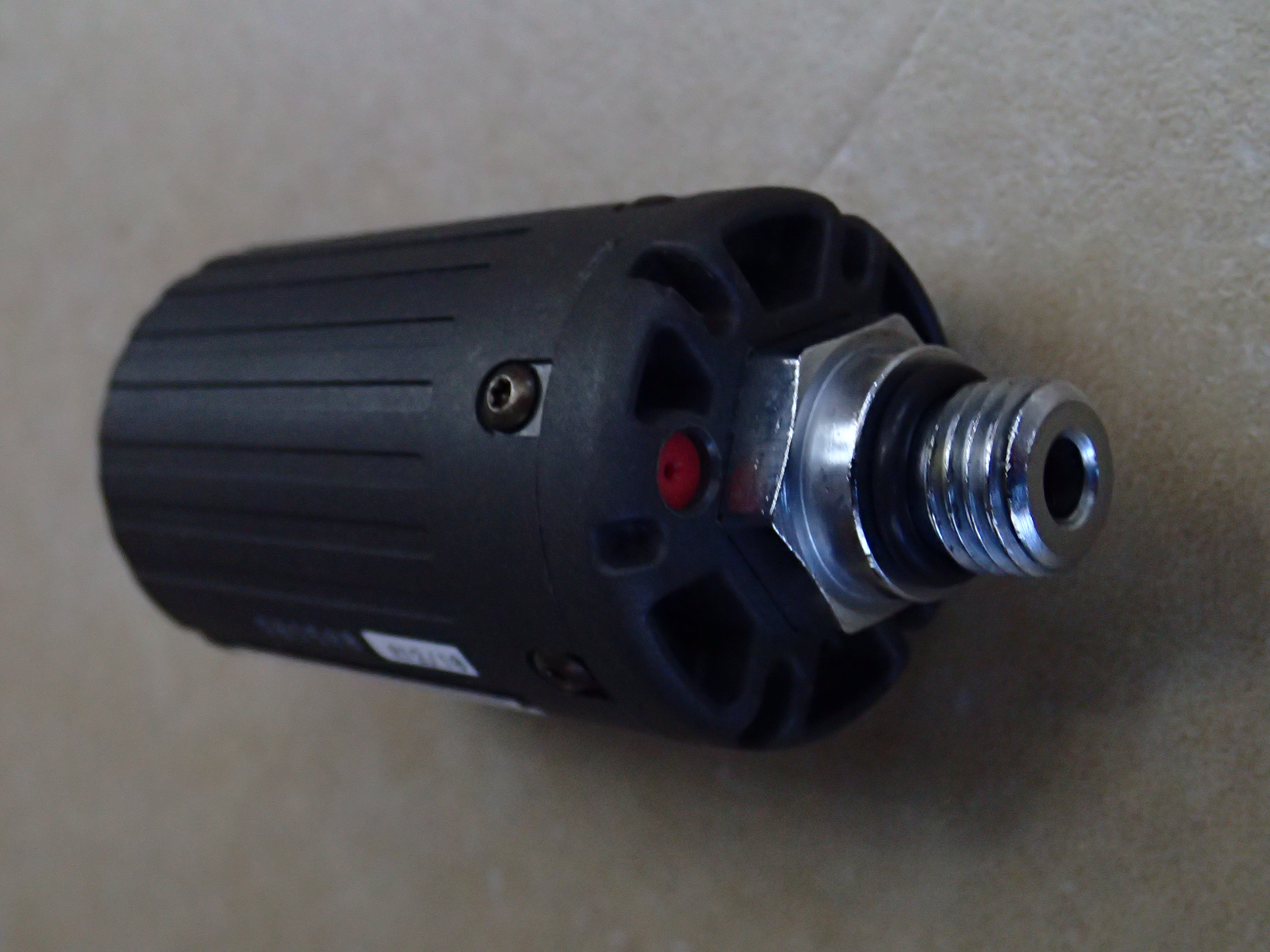
Submersible wireless pressure transducer for remote dive computer display

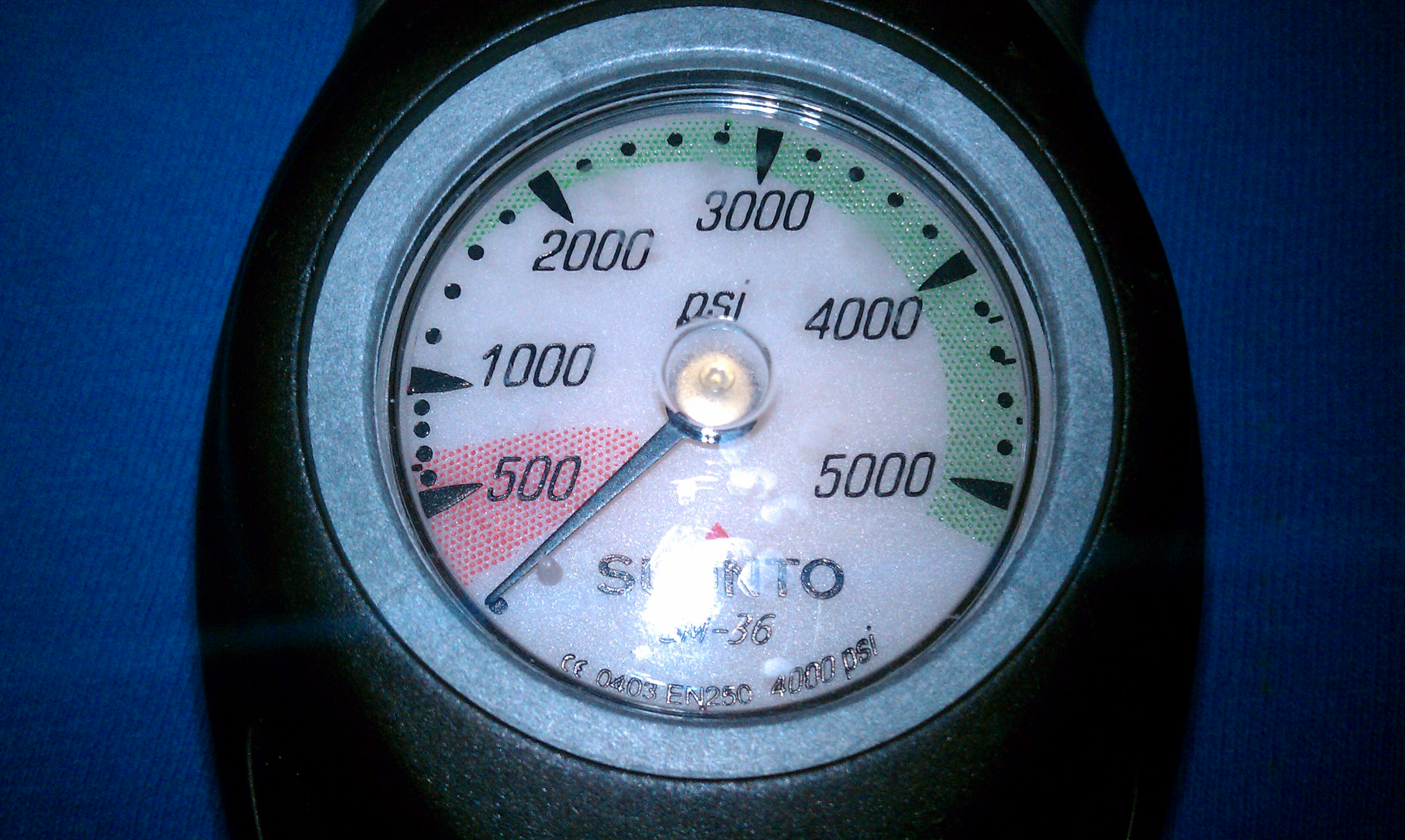
Submersible pressure gauge close up

Diving instrumentation may be for safety or to facilitate the task being performed. Safety-critical information such as gas pressure and decompression status should be presented clearly and unambiguously.

A lack of standardised dive computer user-interfaces can cause confusion under stress. Computer lock-out at times of great need is a potentially fatal design flaw. The meaning of alarms and warnings should be immediately obvious. The diver should be dealing with the problem, not trying to work out what it is. Displays should allow for variations in visual acuity, and be readable with colour-blindness. Ideally, critical displays should be readable without a mask, or allow safe surfacing without a mask. There should not be too much distracting information on the main screen, and returning to the main screen should be automatic by default, or auxiliary screens should continue to display critical decompression data.

Dive computers are safety critical equipment, but there is very little formal training provided for their use. Models also vary considerably in operation, and are often not intuitive, so skills are not transferable when a new unit is used. The user manual is usually all that is available to learn from, and it cannot be taken underwater for convenient reference. Instrument consoles represent a concentrated source of information, and a large potential for operator error.

Dive computers provide a variety of visual dive information to the diver, usually on a LCD or OLED display. More than one screen arrangement may be selectable during a dive, and the primary screen will display by default and contain the safety critical data. Secondary screens are usually selected by pressing one or two buttons one or more times, and may be transient or remain visible until another screen is selected. All safety critical information should be visible on any screen that will not automatically revert within a short period, as the diver may forget how to get back to it and this may put them as significant risk. Some computers use a scroll through system which tends to require more button pushes, but is easier to remember, as eventually the right screen will turn up, others may use a wider selection of buttons, which is quicker when the sequence is known, but easier to forget or become confused, and may demand more of the diver's attention, :

Display and control units for electronically controlled closed circuit rebreathers have very similar requirements and problems to dive computers. This may be reduced when the rebreather controllers and backup dive computer are produced by the same manufacturer.

Head-up displays can be used to provide the diver with a view of critical information which is always visible. These can be mounted on the mask, or on the mouthpiece assembly. Head-up displays require special near-eye 0ptics to allow correct focus on the display. In conditions of very low visibility, a head-up display has the advantage that the diver's ability to see the display is not affected by turbidity. It also lets the diver monitor all displayed dive data without interrupting their work.

== Cutting tools ==
The primary function of diver cutting tools is to deal with entanglement by lines or nets. The tool should be accessible to both hands, and should be capable of cutting the diver free from any entanglement hazard predicted at the dive site. Many divers carry a cutting tool as standard equipment, and it may be required by code of practice as default procedure. When entanglement risk is high, backup cutting tools may be required.

== Dive lights ==
Dive lights may be needed to compensate for insufficient natural illumination or to restore colour. They may be carried in several ways depending on their purpose. Head mount lights are used by divers who need to use both hands for other purposes. With a head mount there is a greater risk of dazzling other divers in the vicinity, as the lights move with the diver's head. As such, this arrangement is more appropriate for divers who work or explore alone. Helmet mounts are appropriate for illuminating work which is monitored via a helmet-mounted closed circuit video camera. Hand-held lights can be directed by the diver independently of the direction the diver is facing and do not require any special mounting equipment. However, they occupy a hand and are at risk of being dropped unless they are clipped on. They are most suitable for incidental lighting, and where precise direction is useful. Glove or Goodman handle mount allows precise direction and allows the hand to perform some other tasks. Canister lights allow the light head to be held in either hand, on a Goodman handle, or looed over the neck to free both hands, and the cable prevents the light from falling far if dropped. It is possible and fairly common to carry more than one of these options. Where light is important for safety, the diver will carry backup lights.

== Buddy lines ==
A buddy line is a line or strap physically tethering two scuba divers together underwater to prevent separation. They can also serve as a means of communication in low visibility conditions.

== Clips and attachment points ==
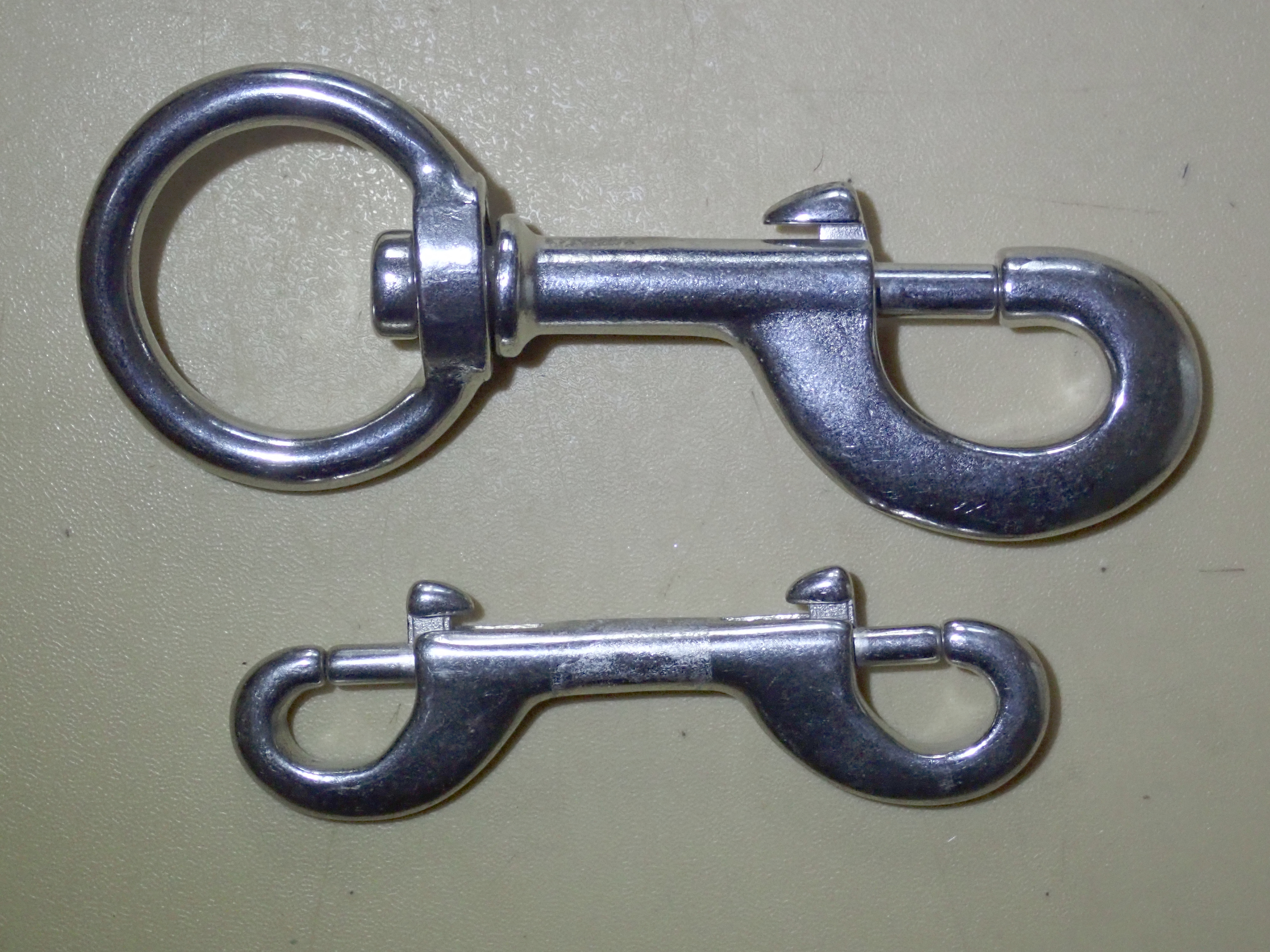
Swivel ring single end and double end bolt snaps

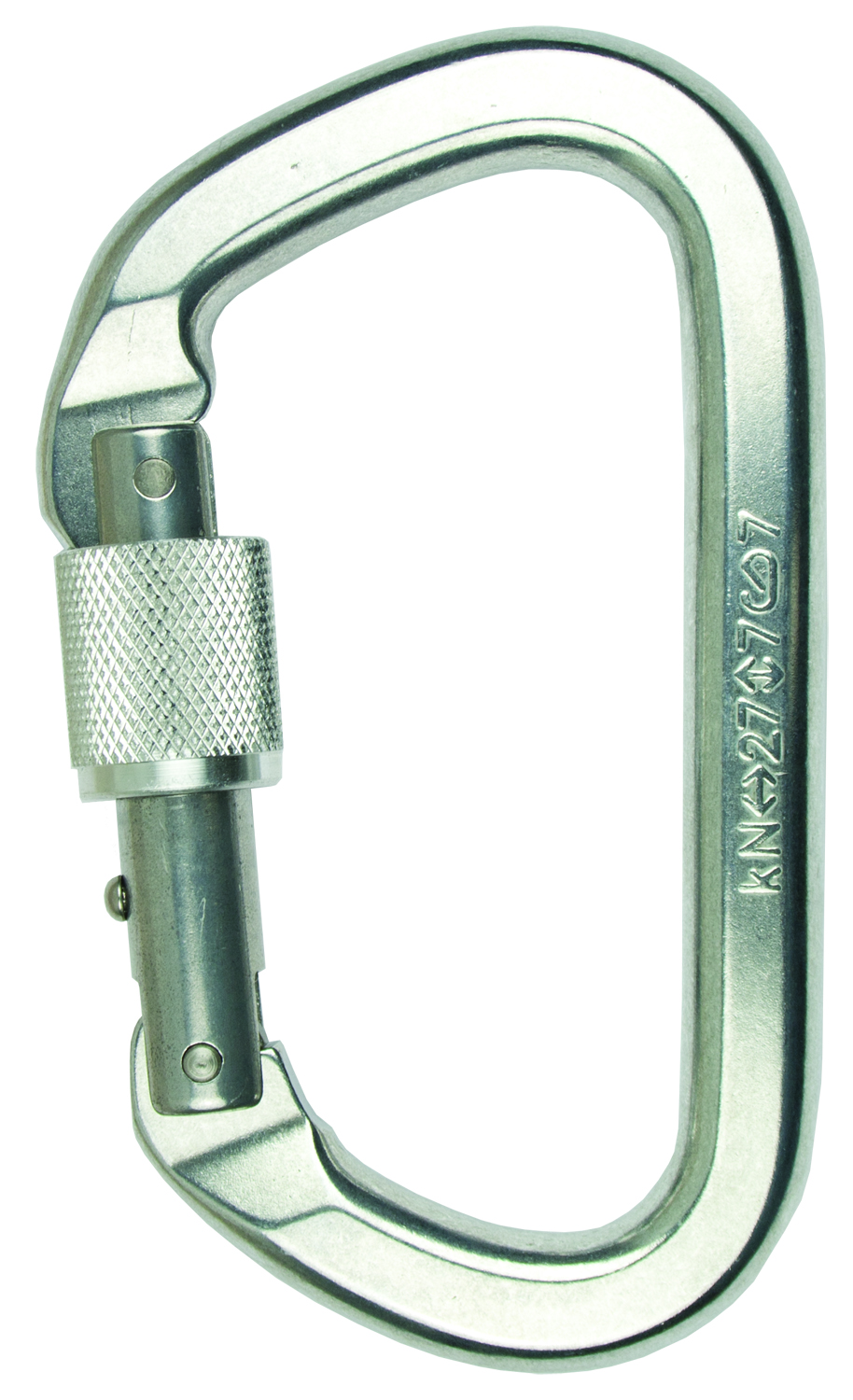
Screw gate carabiner

Clips and attachment points should be reliable and must generally be operable by one hand with gloves suitable for the water temperature, without needing to see what is being done, as it may be dark, low visibility, or out of view. Single-hand operation is necessary where only one hand can reach. This is always preferable, as the other hand may be in use for something important. While unlikely, it is possible for most types of clip to become jammed closed, and if this may endanger the diver it should be possible to use an alternative method to disconnect, which does not involve special tools. Cutting loose using the diver's cutting tool is the standard.

A reliable clip is one that does not allow connection or disconnection by accident, instead requiring specific action by the operator to clip or unclip. Unreliable clips may cause loss of equipment or entanglement. Bolt snaps and screw-gate carabiners are examples of clips with a reputation for reliability. The carabiners are more secure, and may be load rated, but are less convenient to operate. Carabiners are approved for attaching the umbilical to a surface supplied diver's harness.

There are usually several attachment points provided on the diving harness or buoyancy compensator for securing accessories and additional diving cylinders. On technical harnesses these are often in the form of stainless steel D-rings or sliders with integral rings, and may be adjustable for position. Plastic D-rings are common on bulk-produced recreational buoyancy compensators, and are usually in fixed positions, held on by bar-tacked webbing straps or tabs, and are not replaceable. Professional harness is usually required to have at least one attachment point capable of lifting the diver out of the water.

== Diver propulsion vehicles ==
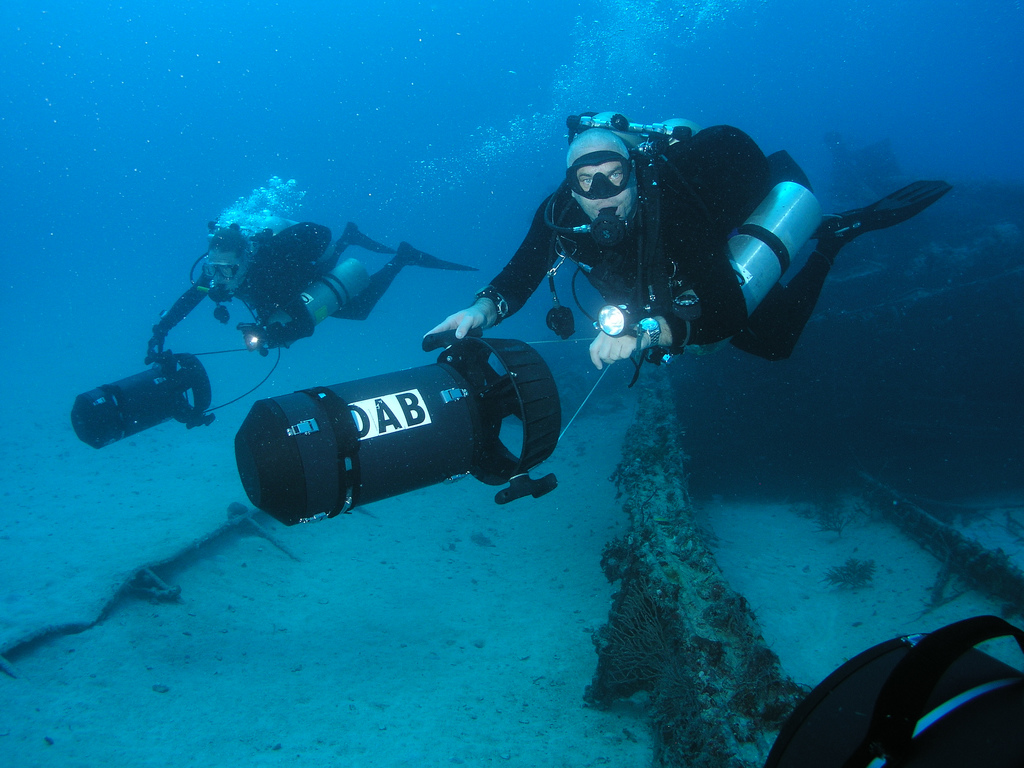
Two divers scootering with heavy duty DPVs

A diver propulsion vehicle (DPV) is a powered device with an integral thruster used by scuba divers to increase their range underwater. Range is restricted by the amount of breathing gas that can be carried, the rate at which that breathing gas is consumed, and the power endurance and speed of the DPV. Time limits imposed on the diver by decompression requirements may also limit safe range in practice. DPVs have recreational, scientific and military applications. They have been produced in a range of configurations from small, easily portable scooter units with a small range and low speed, to faired or enclosed units capable of carrying several divers longer distances at higher speeds.

The most efficient position for towing behind is when the wake of the thruster bypasses the diver. This is usually achieved by using a tow leash from the DPV to a D-ring on the lower front of the diver's harness. The diver also holds a handle on top of the DPV with a dead-man switch that turns off power to the DPV as soon as the diver lets go of the handle. The DPV is commonly steered by one hand, leaving the other hand free for other tasks. This requires good static and dynamic balance of the DPV and diver to avoid excessive diver fatigue. Lights, cameras, navigation, and other instruments may be mounted on a DPV for convenience, but the diver should also carry backups for essential instruments in case the DPV must be abandoned in an emergency. Control of the DPV is additional task loading and can distract the diver. A DPV can increase the risk of a silt-out if the thrust is allowed to wash over the bottom.

DPV operation requires greater situational awareness than simply swimming, as some changes can happen much faster. Operating a DPV requires simultaneous depth control, buoyancy adjustment, monitoring of breathing gas, and navigation. Buoyancy control is vital for diver safety. The DPV has the capacity to dynamically compensate for poor buoyancy control by thrust vectoring while moving, but once it stops the diver may turn out to be dangerously positively or negatively buoyant if adjustments were not made to suit the changes in depth while moving. If the diver does not control the DPV properly, a rapid ascent or descent under power can result in barotrauma or decompression sickness.

== Cameras ==
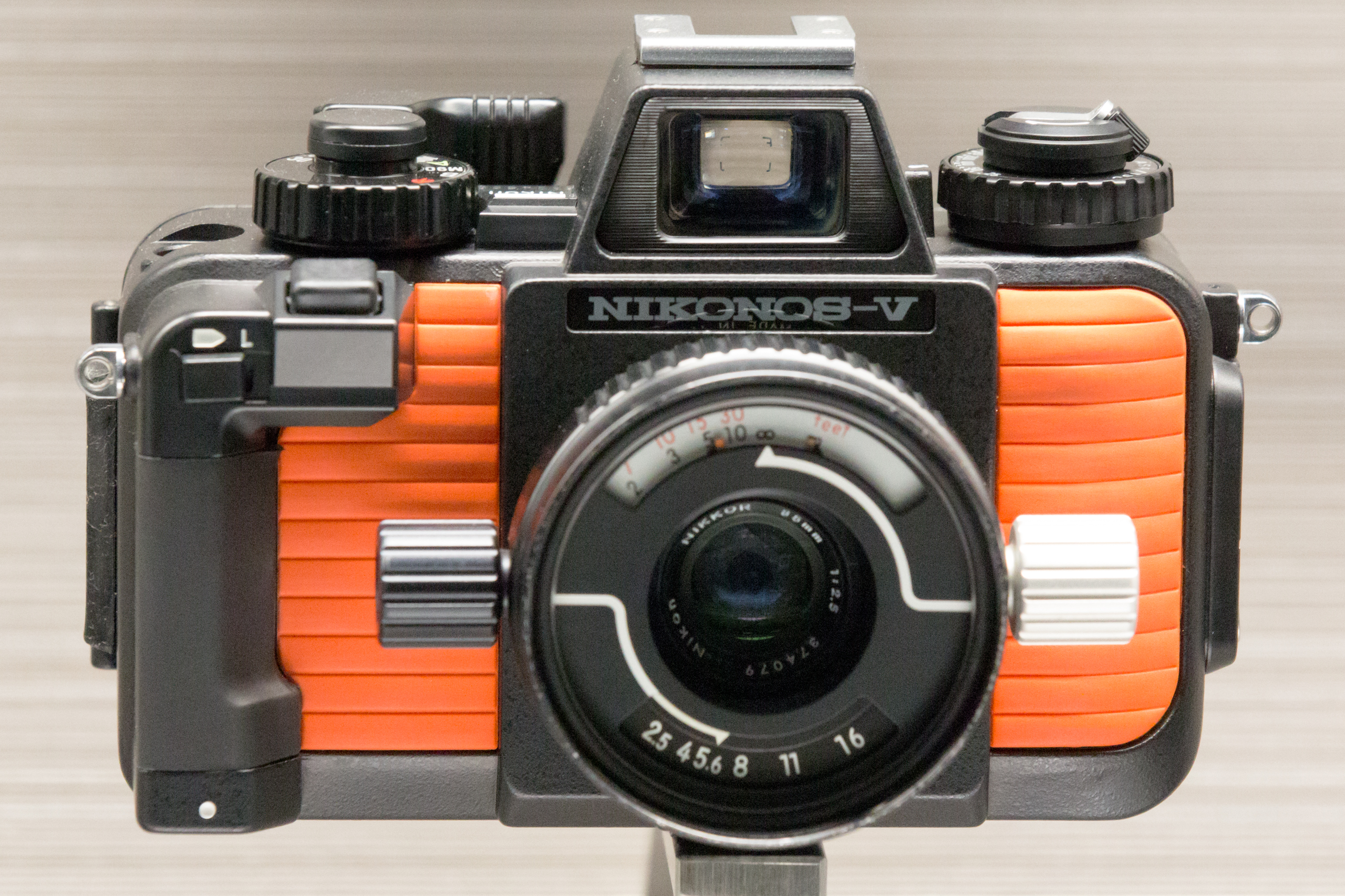
The Nikonos V, a film camera designed specifically for underwater use

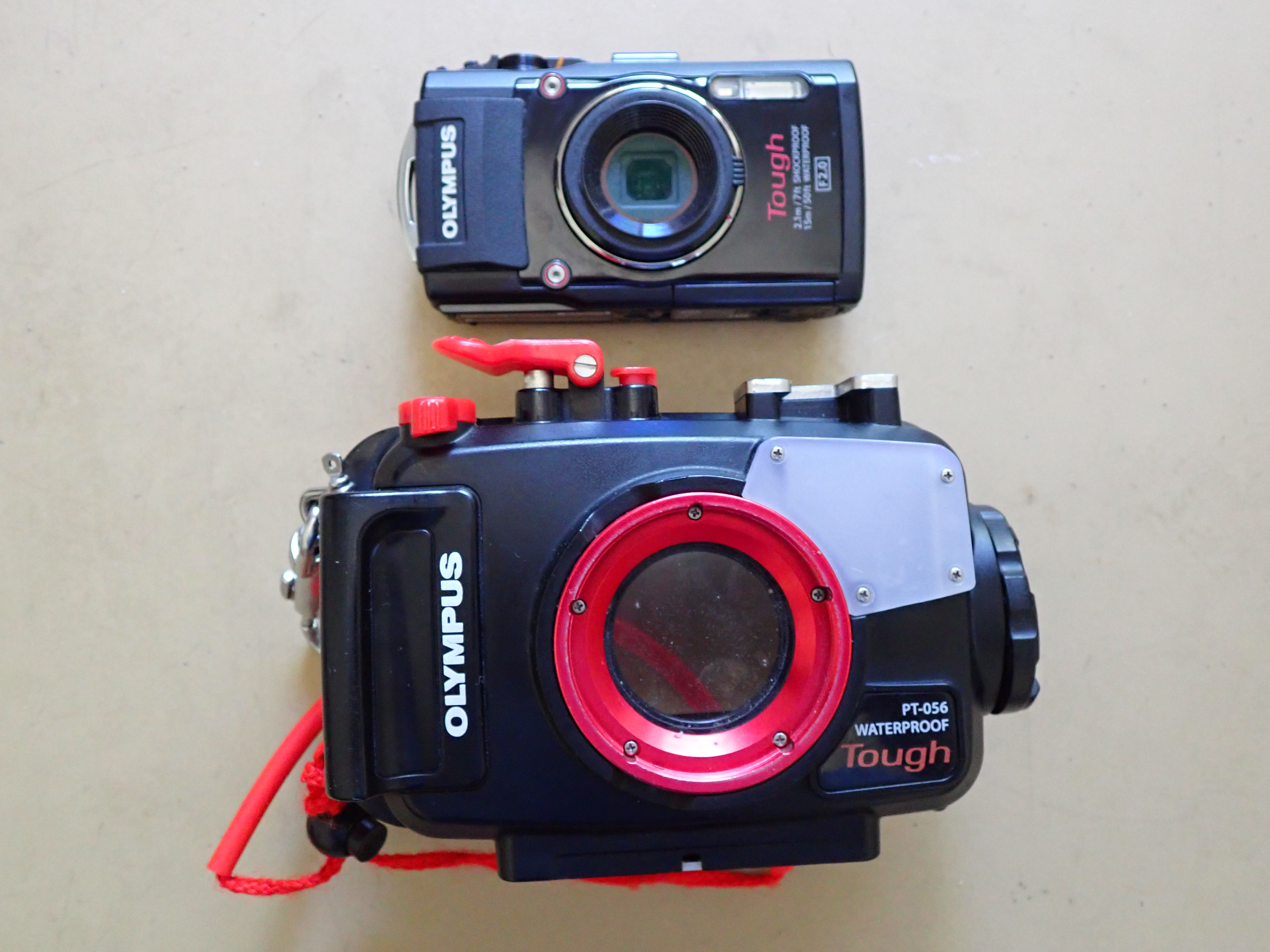
Olympus TG-3 rugged compact digital camera and its underwater housing, front view, showing relatively small size of the housing and good ergonomics of shutter release lever and hand grip.

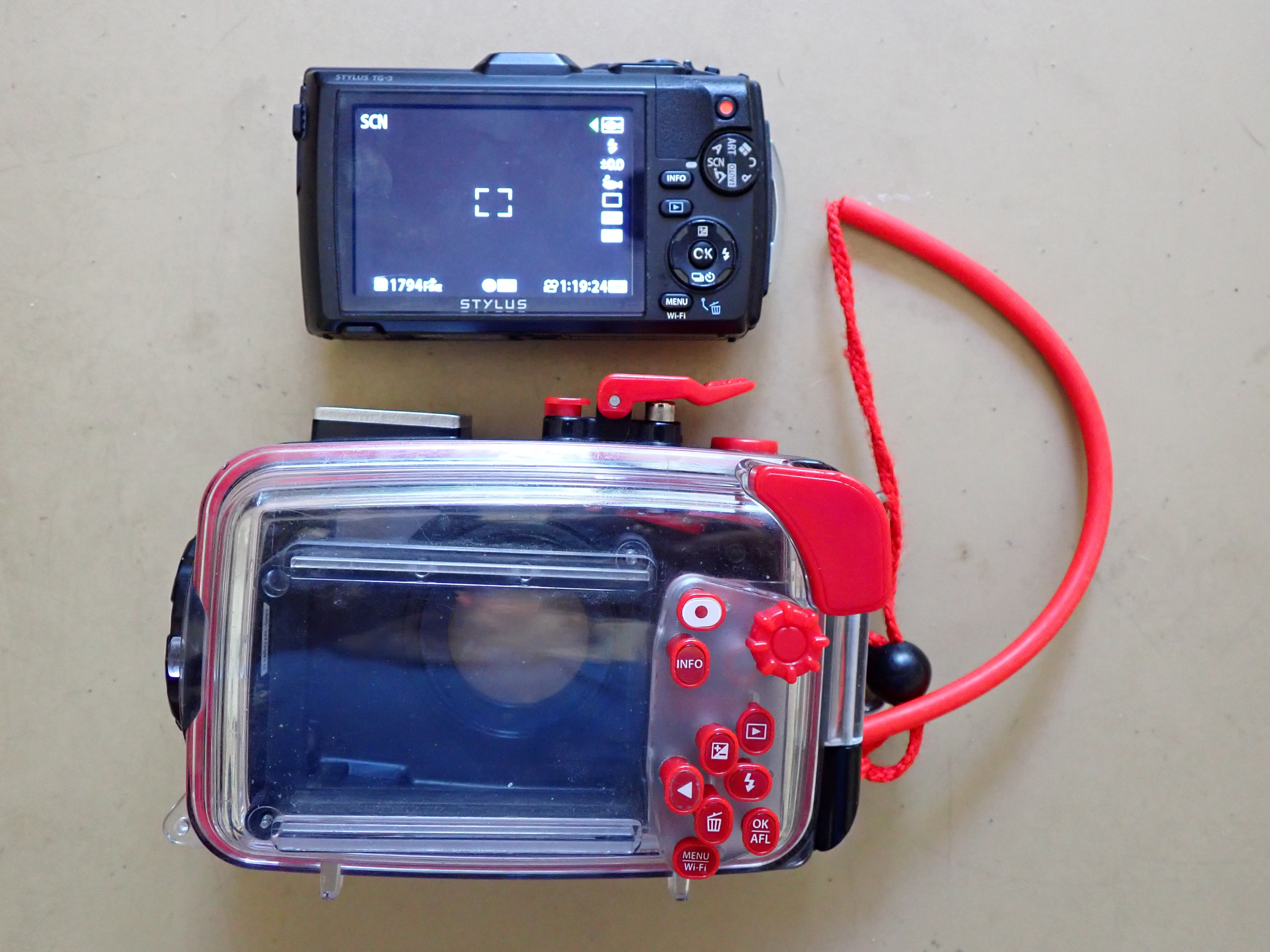
Olympus TG-3 camera and underwater housing, back view, showing relatively large view screen for focus and framing, but relatively crowded buttons for controlling detailed settings.

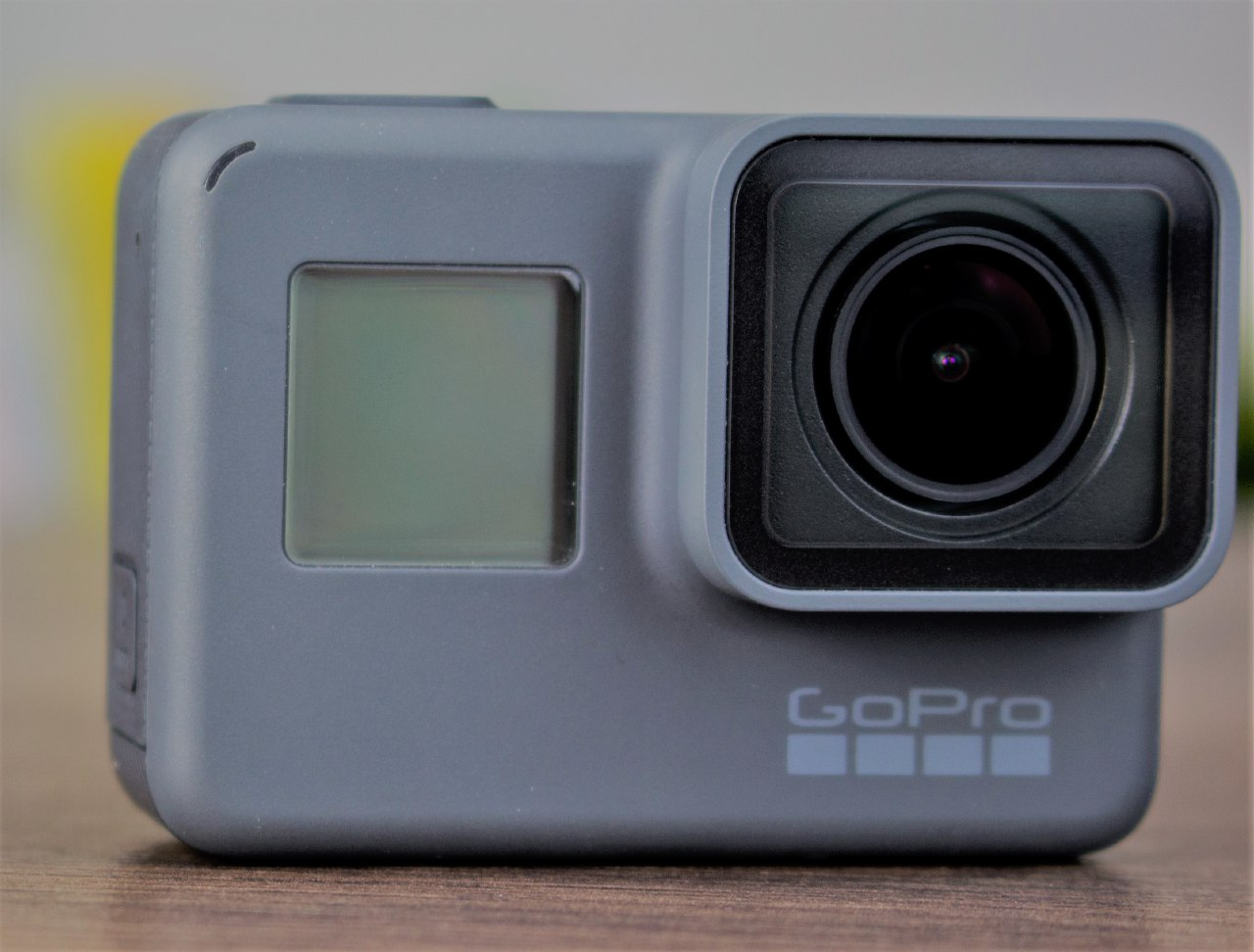
GoPro Hero5 action camera in underwater housing

Underwater cameras are usually popular models encased in a watertight pressure housing. There are a few notable exceptions, such as the Nikonos and Sea & Sea ranges, in which the camera body was the pressure housing. Controls are generally operated by movable links penetrating the watertight case, each requiring reliable seals because they represent a possible leak. Compact and lightweight camera bodies with multiple controls packed into a small space tend to transform into bulky, heavy and expensive units when housed for moderately deep diving. The camera's controls must be operable using thick gloves in cold water. For most underwater photography, a camera that is close to neutral buoyancy will be easier to handle and have less disruptive effect on diver trim. Strobe arms incorporating incompressible buoyancy compartments are the preferred system, as they do not need to be adjusted for changes of depth.

Internal flash is problematic at anything except very close range, as it can cause backscatter in cloudy water, and is the major consumer of battery power at full power. External flash using optical coupling avoids hull penetrations and potential leaks, and video lights give a good preview of exposure, and also provide the diver with a high-power dive light that is already pointing in the right direction to record the scene. With more powerful video lights and low-light sensitivity cameras, flash may not be necessary.

== Surface marker buoys ==
A surface marker buoy is towed to indicate the position of the diver. It should have sufficient buoyancy to reliably remain at the surface so it can be seen. If it is actively towed, it should not develop so much drag that the diver is unable to manage it effectively. The tow line may be a major source of drag (roughly proportional to its diameter); as such, a smaller, smooth line is preferable, and also fits on a more compact reel or spool. Smaller line may need to be of stronger and more abrasion-resistant material like ultra-high-molecular-weight polyethylene for acceptable durability.

A decompression buoy is deployed towards the end of the dive as a signal to the surface that the diver has started to ascend.

== Distance lines and line markers, reels and spools ==
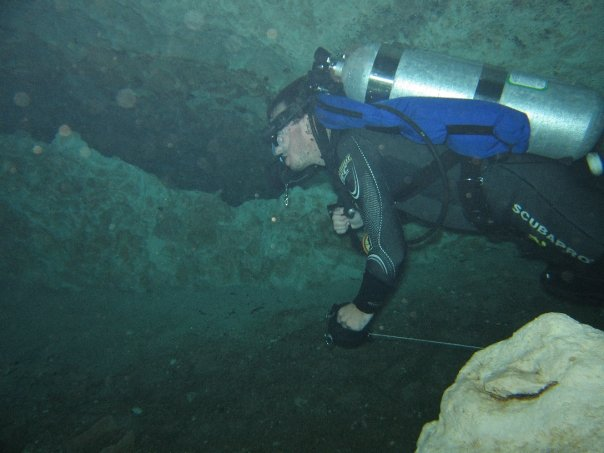
A cave diver running a distance line into the overhead environment to facilitate a safe exit

Cave diving line markers

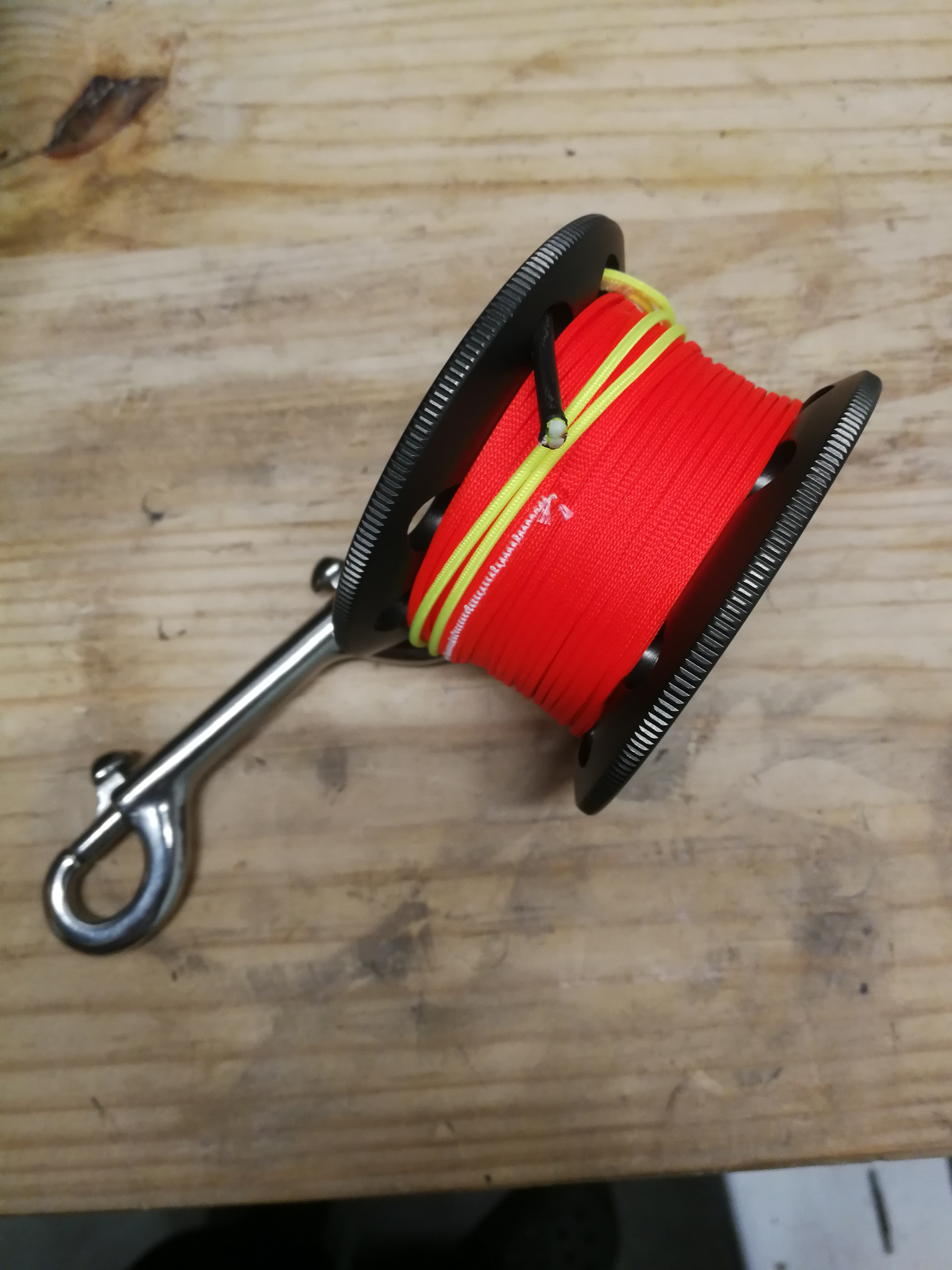
Cave line spool with double end bolt snap.

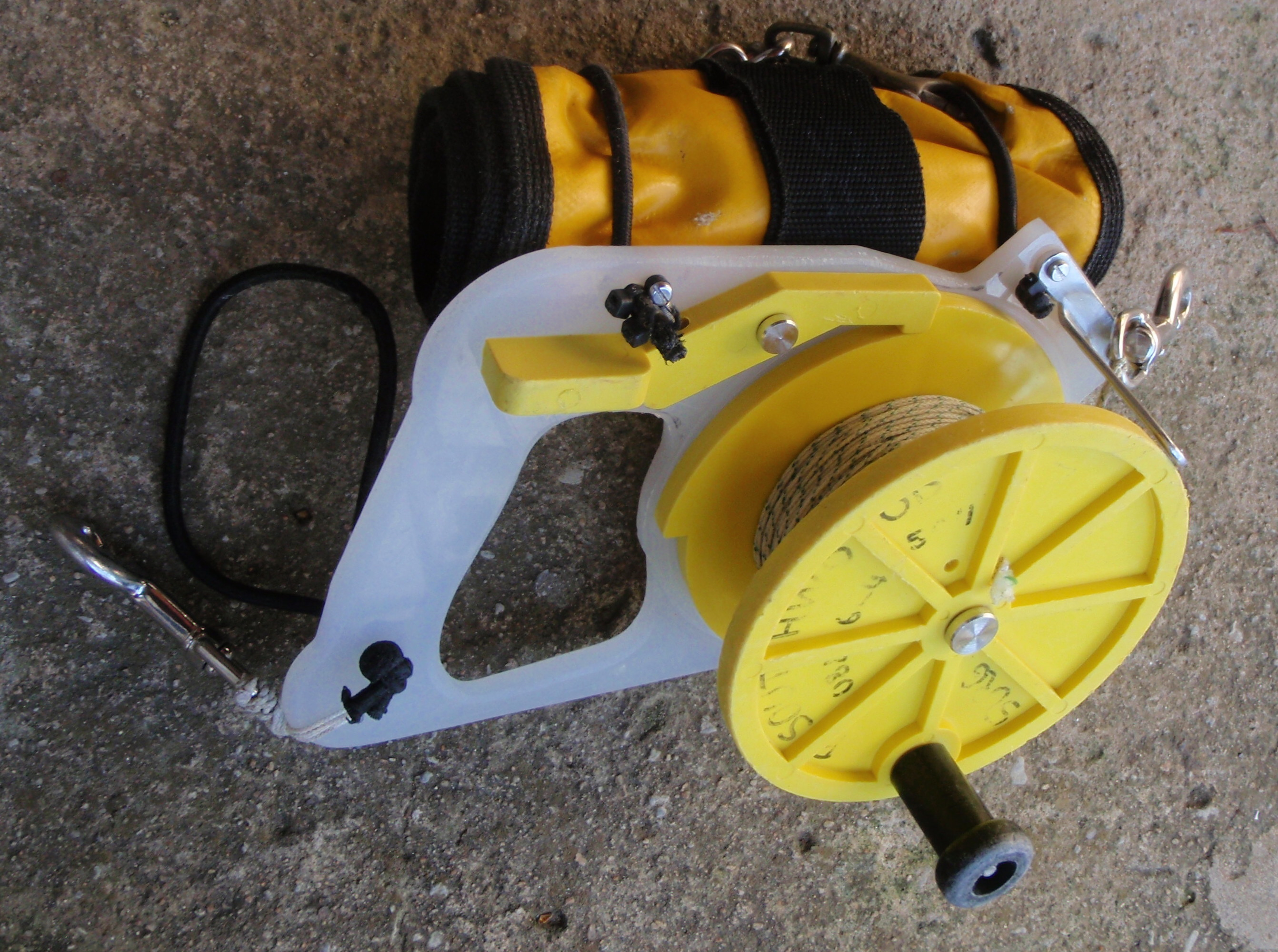
Open ratchet reel with closed handle, with DSMB stowed

Distance lines are used for underwater navigation where it is either essential to mark the route out of the overhead environment, or necessary or desirable to return to a specific point. Lines are deployed from reels or spools, and may be left in place or recovered on the return. The design and construction of the reel have a large influence on handling during both deployment and recovery of line, which are major parts of the task loading of one of the divers in a wreck or cave penetration team. Good design can minimise effort of winding in the line, and an adjustable brake reduces risk of overruns and loose line in the water while laying the line, which is an entanglement hazard. Highly visible line helps reduce the risk of losing the line in bad visibility, and a near neutral buoyancy of the reel minimises the fatigue caused by carrying it in the hand for long periods. Matching the size of a reel or spool to its intended use allows easy recognition by feel and efficient storage.

Line markers are generally used on permanent guidelines to provide critical information to divers following the line. Slots and notches are used to wrap the line and secure the marker in place. Passing the line through the enlarged area at the base of the two slots allows the marker to slide along the line, or even fall off if brushed by a diver. To more securely fasten the marker, an extra wrap may be added at each slot. It must be possible to fit, interpret, and remove a line marker by feel in total darkness with the line under moderate tension. All of this must happen without dislodging the line. The basic function of these markers is fairly consistent internationally, but procedures may differ by region or team. The protocol for placement and removal should be well understood by the members of a specific team.

A dive reel comprises a spool to hold the line. It is coupled with a winding knob which rotates on an axle attached to a frame, with a handle to hold the assembly in position while in use. A line guide is almost always present to prevent line from unwinding unintentionally, and there is usually a method of clipping the reel to the diver's harness when not in use. Reels may be made from a wide variety of materials, but near neutral buoyancy and resistance to impact damage are desirable features. Reels may also be open or closed. This refers to the presence of a cover around the spool, which is intended to reduce the risk of line tangles on the spool, or line flipping over the side and causing a jam. To some extent this works, but if there is a jam the cover effectively prevents the diver from correcting it. Open reels allow easy access to free jams caused by overwinds or line getting caught between spool and handle, and allow visual checks on the line while winding it in. Reels should be easy to use and lockable to prevent unintentionally unrolling, and have sufficient friction to prevent overruns. Reels used for deploying DSMBs usually have a thumb release ratchet to allow free running deployment and to prevent unwinding when there is tension on the line at other times. A reel with a closed handle is less tiring to hold for long periods, particularly when wearing thick or stiff gloves.

Finger spools are a simple, compact, and low tech alternative to reels that are best suited to relatively short lengths of line. They are a pair of circular flanges with a hole in the middle, connected by a tubular hub, which is sized to use a finger as an axle when unrolling the line. The line is secured by clipping a bolt snap through a hole on one of the flanges and over the line as it leaves the reel. It is reeled in by holding the spool with one hand and simply winding the line onto the spool by hand. Spools are most suitable for reasonably short lines, up to about 50 m, as it becomes tedious to roll up longer lengths. The double end bolt snap for locking the line may also be used as an aid for winding it in, to avoid line abrasion of the fingers or gloves.

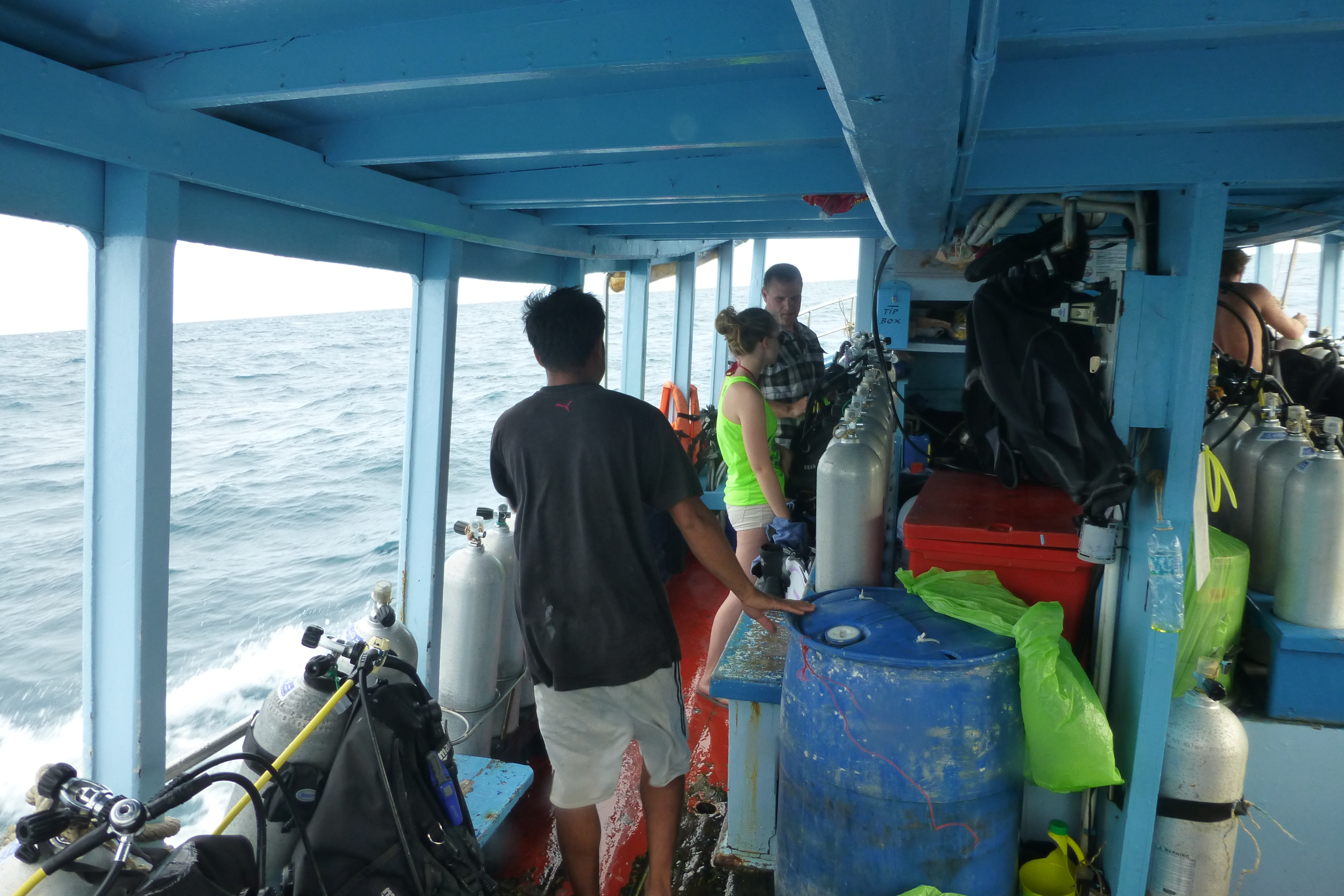
Dive boat at Koh Tao, Thailand

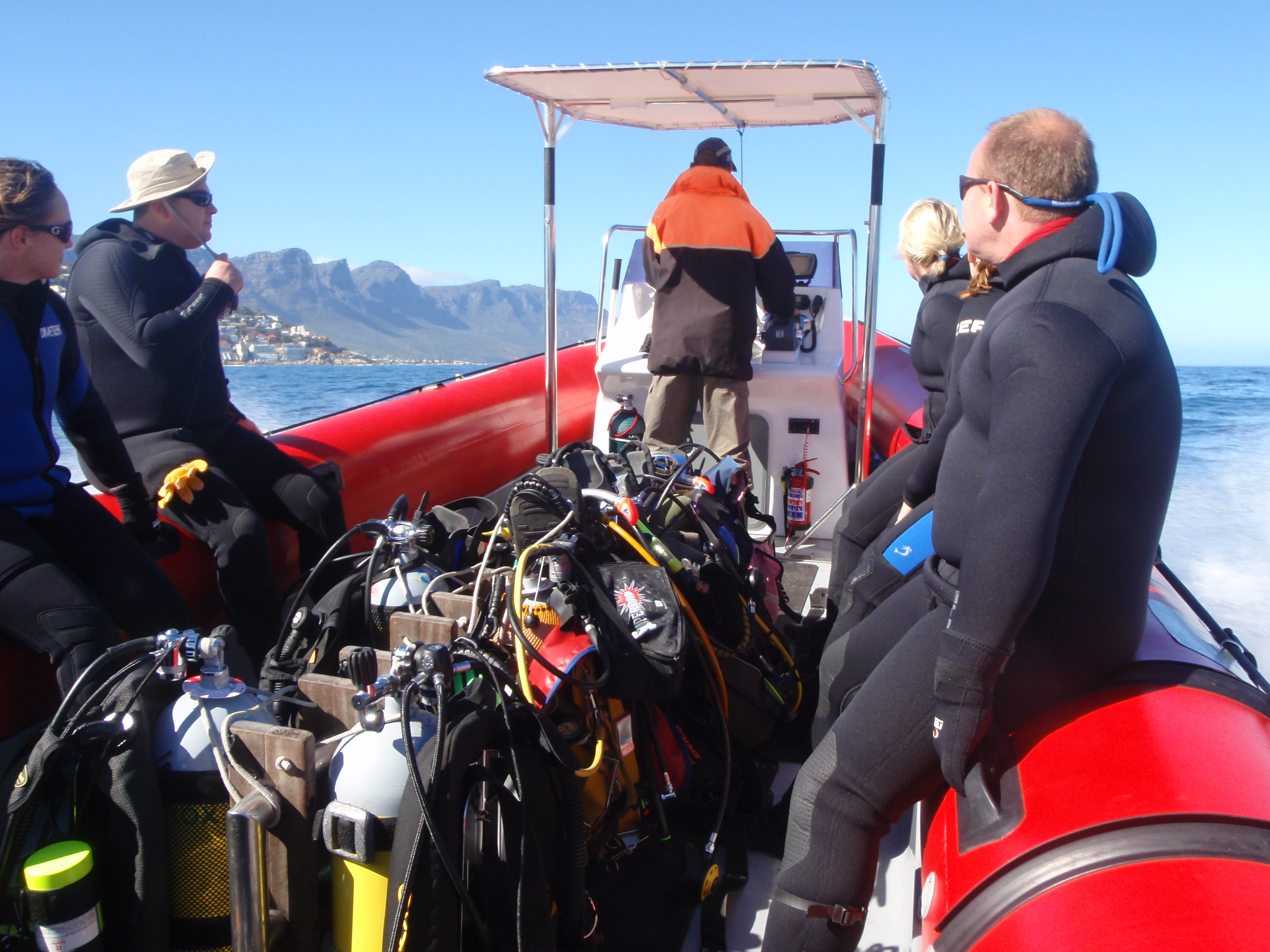
Scuba sets secured to a centreline rack on a large RIB

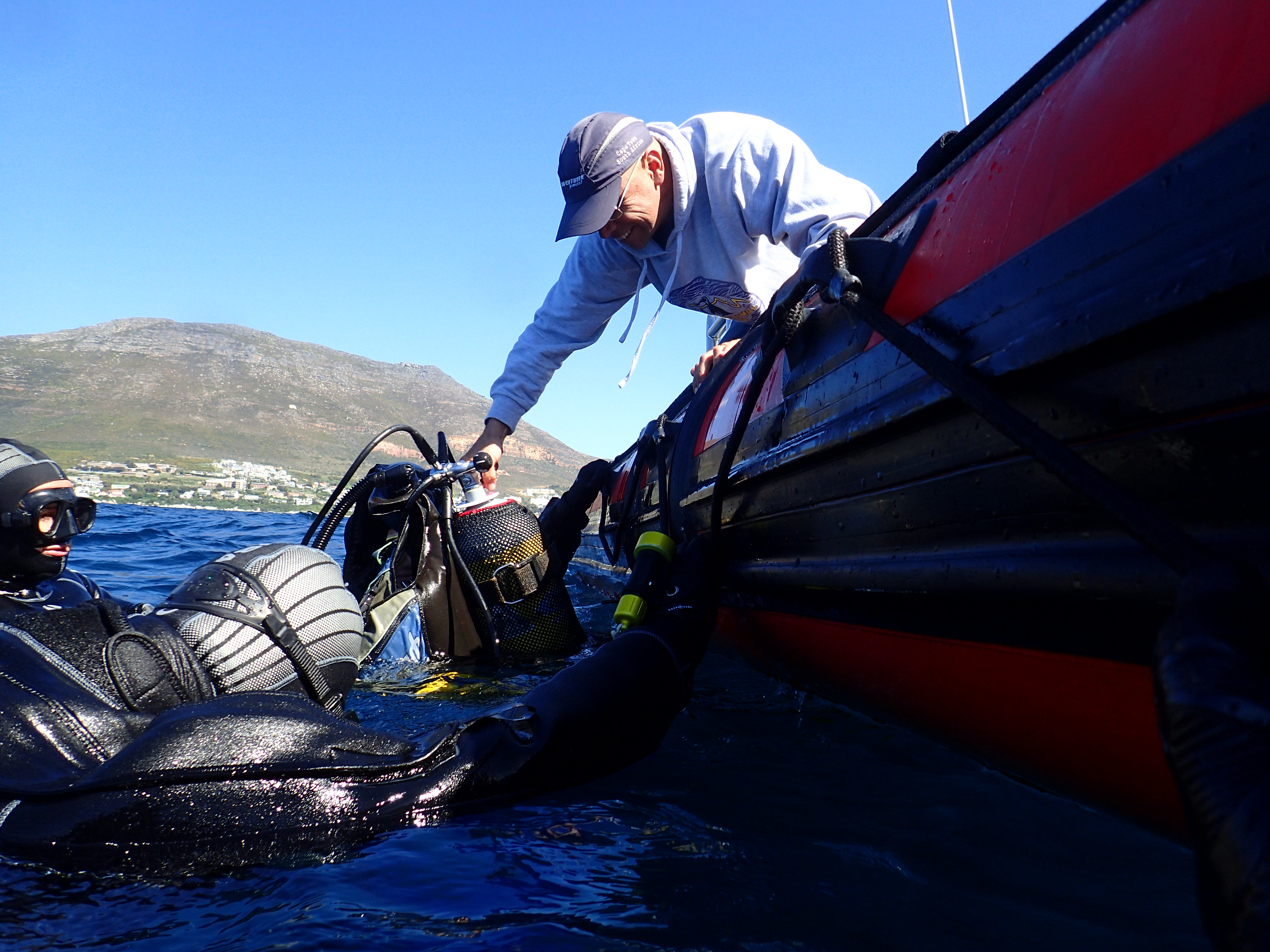
Lifting a scuba set into boat

== Diving chambers ==
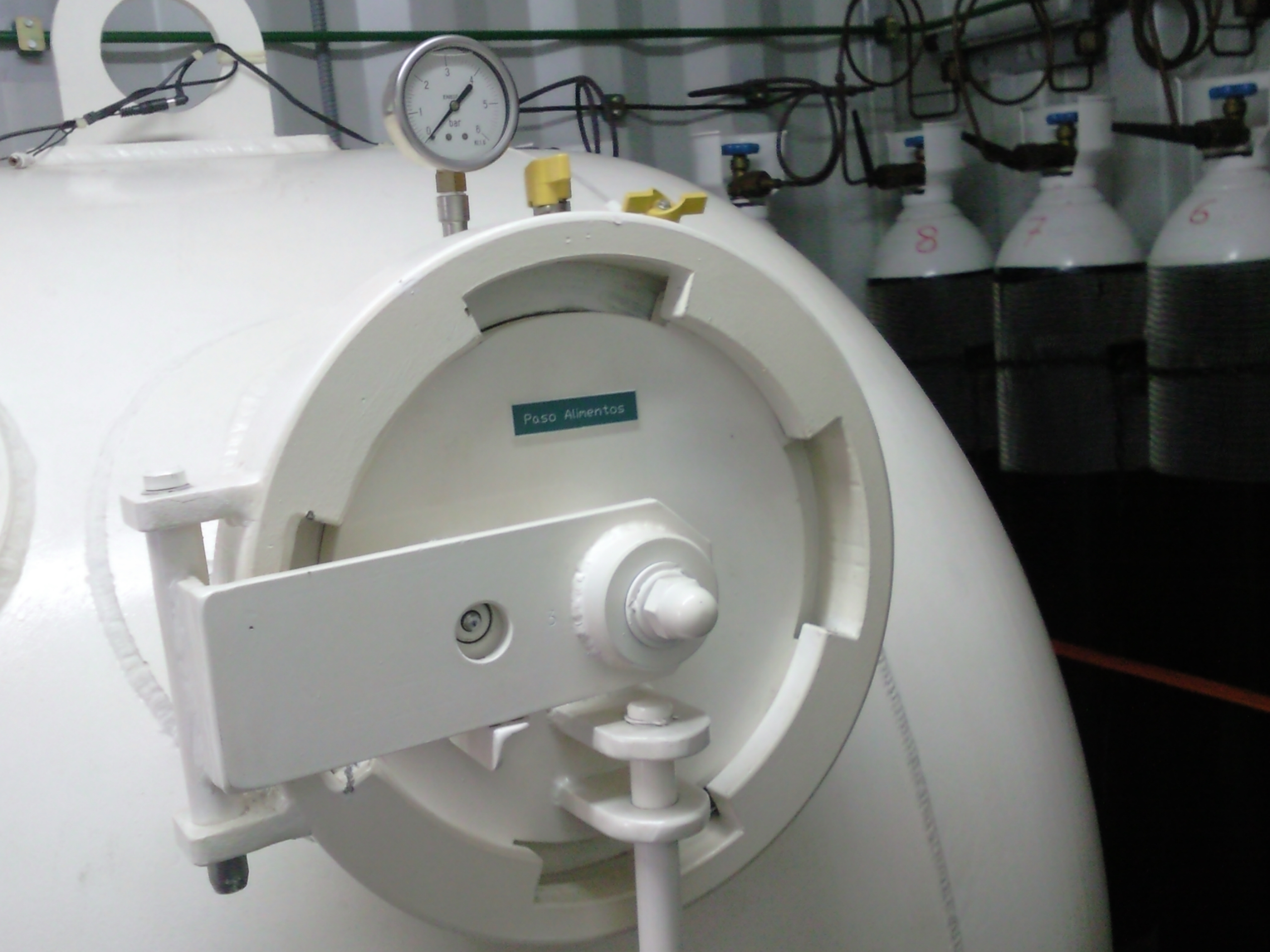
Medical lock on decompression chamber. Used to transfer medical supplies and food into and out of the chamber while it is under pressure. The door is locked by a 45 degree rotation. A safety interlock that prevents any rotation of the door while the lock is pressurised can be seen in the disengaged position, showing that it is safe to open the outer door. The gauge also shows that the pressure has been released.

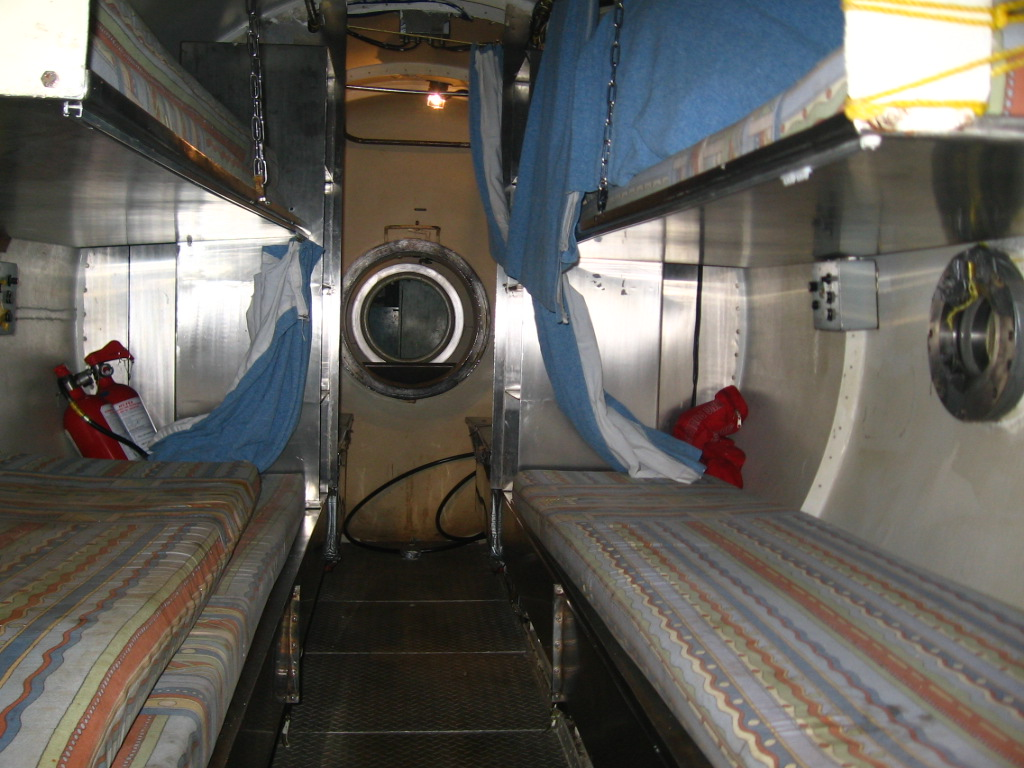
Accommodation chambers of a saturation system

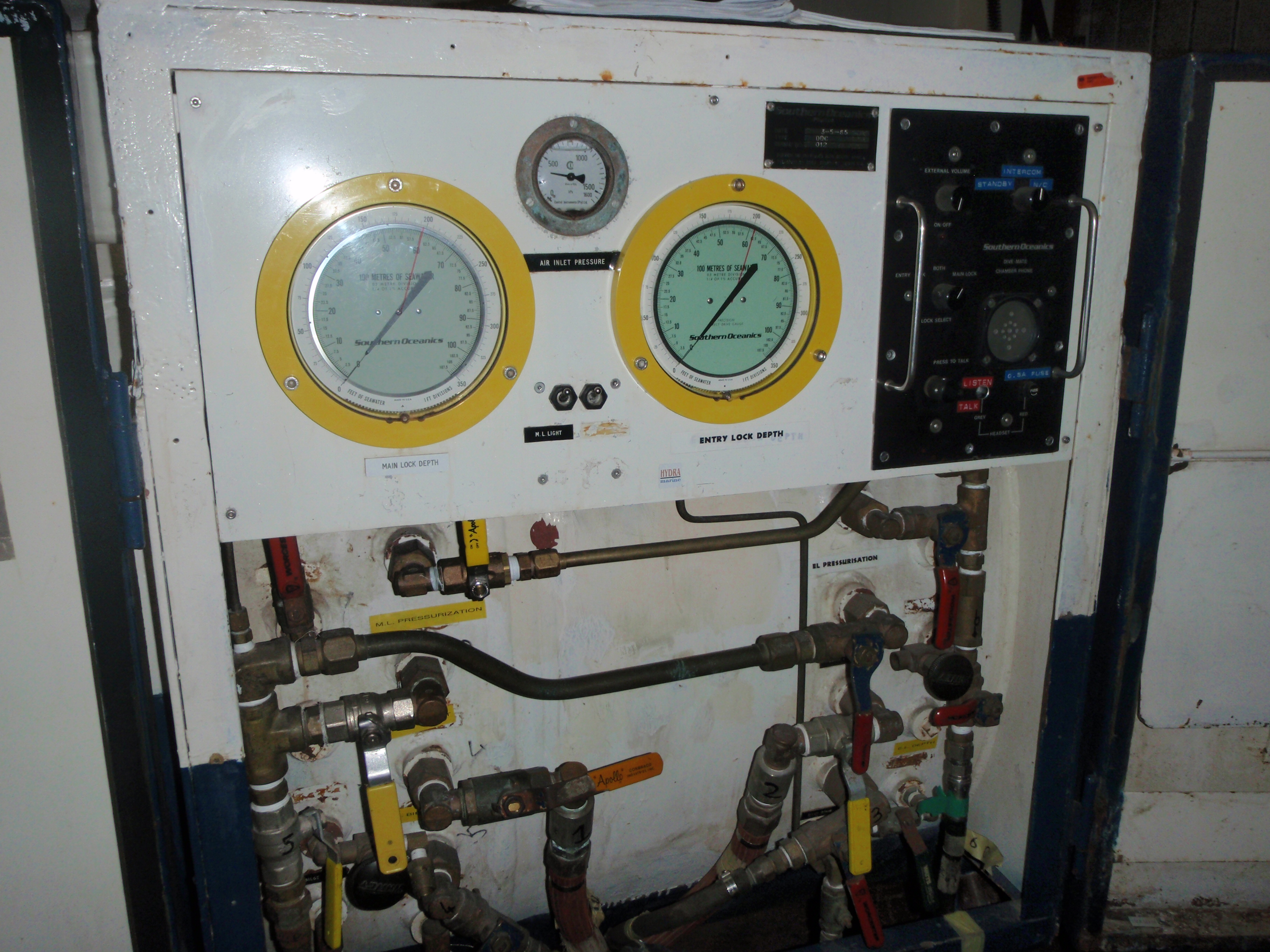
Basic deck decompression chamber control panel

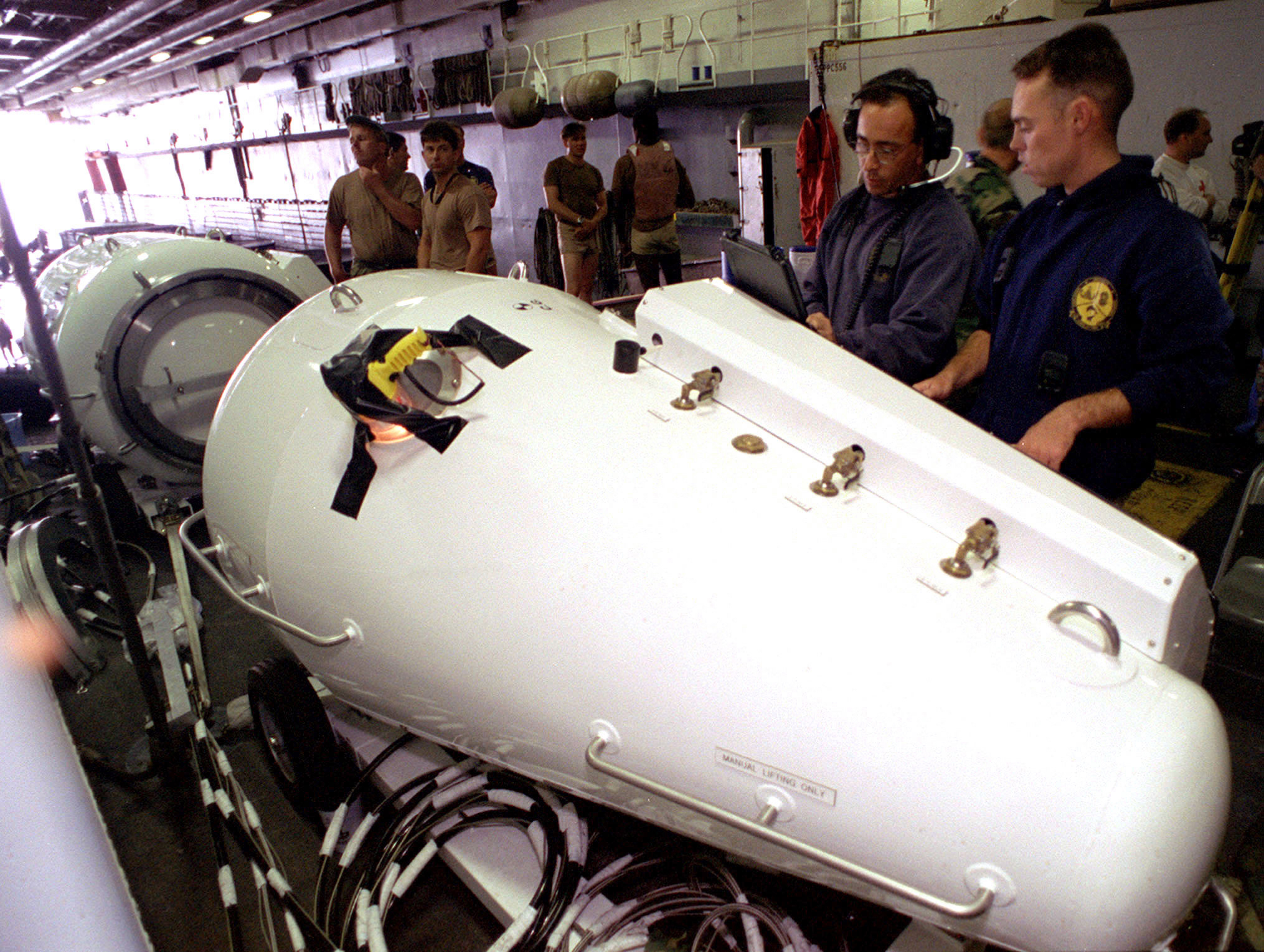
US Navy transportable recompression chamber system

Design and construction of pressure vessels for human occupancy are regulated by law, safety standards, and codes of practice. These specify safety and ergonomic requirements, airlock opening sizes, internal dimensions, valve types and arrangement, safety interlocks, pressure gauge types and arrangements, gas inlet silencers, outlet safety covers, seating, illumination, breathing gas supply and monitoring, climate control and communications systems. Other requirements are also specified for structural strength, permitted materials, over-pressure relief, testing, fire suppression and periodical inspection.

A closed bell design must allow access by divers wearing bulky diving suits and bailout sets appropriate for the depth. The amount of gas in the bailout set is calculated for a return rate of 10 metres per minute from the reach of the excursion umbilical. At greater depths, this may require twin sets of high pressure cylinders. It must also be possible for the bellman to hoist an unconscious diver through the lock. A flood-up valve may be provided to allow partial flooding of the bell, so that an unresponsive diver is partially supported by buoyancy while being maneuvered through the opening. Once suspended inside the bell, the water can be blown back down by adding gas. The internal volume must include enough space for divers and equipment including racks for the excursion umbilicals and the bell gas panel. On-board gas cylinders, emergency power packs, tools and hydraulic power supply lines do not have to be stored inside. Access while underwater is through a lock at the bottom, so that the internal gas pressure can keep the water out. This lock can be used for transfer to the saturation habitat, or a side lock can be provided. The side lock does not need to allow passage with harness and bailout cylinders as these are not carried into the habitat area and are serviced at atmospheric pressure.

The splash zone is the region where the bell passes through the surface of the water and where wave action and platform movement can cause the bell to swing around, which can be uncomfortable and dangerous to the occupants. To limit this motion a bell cursor may be used. This is a device used to guide and control the motion of the bell through the air and the splash zone near the surface, where waves can move the bell significantly. It can either be a passive system that relies on additional ballast weight or an active system that uses a controlled drive system to provide vertical motion. The cursor has a cradle which locks onto the bell and moves vertically on rails to constrain lateral movement. The bell is released and locked onto the cursor in the relatively still water below the splash zone.

A bell stage is a rigid frame that may be fitted below a closed bell to ensure that even if the bell is lowered so far as to contact the clump weight or the seabed, there is enough space under the bell for the divers to get in and out through the bottom lock. If all the lifting arrangements fail, the divers must be able to shelter inside the bell while awaiting rescue, and must be able to get out if the rescue is to another bell when the bell is resting on the seabed.

Each compartment of a hyperbaric system for human occupation has an independent externally mounted pressure gauge so that it is not possible to confuse which compartment pressure is being displayed. Where physically practicable, lock doors open towards the side where pressure is normally higher, so that a higher internal pressure will hold them closed and sealed.

Medical and supply lock outer doors generally open outwards due to space constraints, and therefore are fitted with safety interlock systems which prevent them from being opened with internal pressure above atmospheric. This helps avoid the possibility of human error allowing them to be opened while the inner lock is not sealed, as the uncontrolled decompression that would ensue would probably kill the occupants, and possibly also the lock operator.

Internal diameter of hyperbaric living compartments and deck decompression chambers is constrained by codes of practice for reasonable comfort for the occupants. For emergency transfer chambers, there may be overriding logistical constraints on size and mass.

=== Hyperbaric stretchers ===
A hyperbaric stretcher is a lightweight pressure vessel for human occupancy (PVHO) designed to accommodate one person undergoing initial hyperbaric treatment during or while awaiting transport or transfer to a treatment chamber. The stretcher should accommodate most divers without being excessively claustrophobic, be conveniently portable by a reasonable number of bearers, should fit into the available space in the transport likely to be used, and fit through the entry opening of the treatment chamber or lock onto the chamber for transfer under pressure. It should be possible to see and communicate with the person in the chamber, and the occupant should be able to breathe oxygen which is vented to the exterior to keep a constant internal pressure and limit the fire hazard. Breathing gas supplies should also be portable, and it should be possible to disconnect them for a short period when maneuvering in tight spaces.

A saturated diver who needs to be evacuated should be transported without a significant change in ambient pressure. Hyperbaric evacuation requires pressurised transportation equipment, and could be required in a range of situations. The pressure rating and locking mechanism of the evacuation chamber must be compatible with the saturation system it is to serve and the reception facility. This is because both transfers must be under pressure, and it may not be safe to start decompression during the evacuation.

== Access equipment ==
Access equipment is the gear needed to get into and out of the water. In most cases, it refers to diving from a floating platform, but also applies to shore dives where access requires equipment.

=== Diving stages and wet bells ===
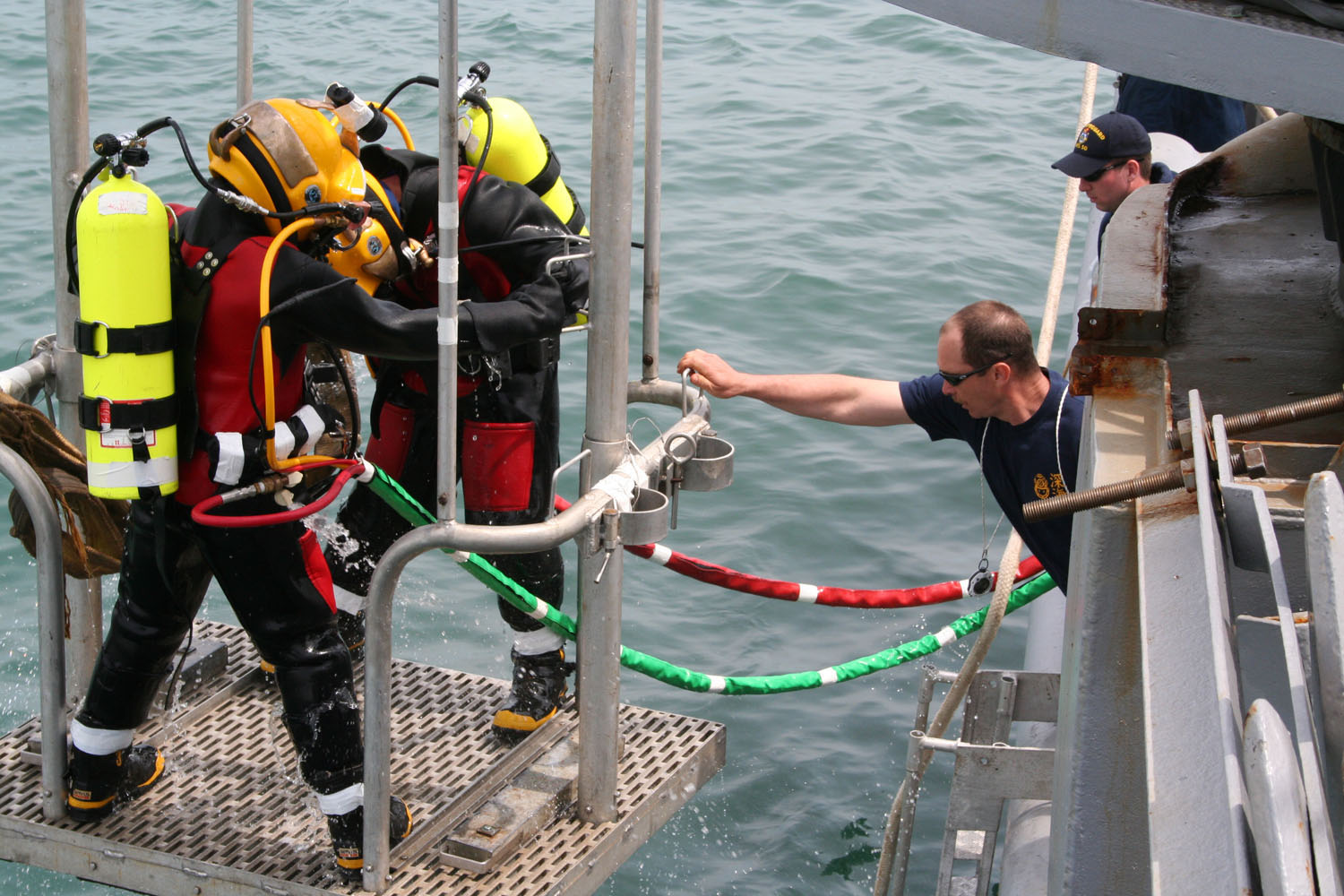
Diving stage

Diving stages and wet bells are open platforms used to lower the divers to the work site and to control the ascent and in-water decompression, and to provide safe and easy entry and exit from the water. Design must provide space for the working diver and possibly the bellman. They must be in positions where they are protected from impact during transit and prevented from falling out when above the water. The divers may be seated, but standing during transit is more common.

A stage must have a way to guide the umbilical from the surface tending point to the diver so the diver can be sure of finding the right way back to the stage. This can be provided by having the diver exit the stage on the opposite side to boarding, with the umbilical passing through the frame, but this is not infallible in bad visibility, and a closed fairlead is more reliable. Running the umbilical via the stage may also be needed to ensure the diver cannot approach known hazards, such as the thrusters of a dynamically positioned vessel.

A wet bell has an open-bottomed air space at the top, large enough for the diver and bellman's heads. This space can be used as a place of refuge in an emergency, where some breathing problems can be managed. The air space must be large enough for an unresponsive diver to be suspended by their harness with their head in the air space, as it may be necessary to remove an unresponsive diver's helmet or full-face mask to provide first aid. The bell is also provided with an on-board emergency gas supply, sufficient for any planned or reasonably foreseeable decompression, and a means of safely switching between surface and on-board gas supply. This necessitates an on-board gas distribution manifold and divers' umbilicals that are deployed from and stored on the bell, and someone to operate the panel and tend the working diver's excursion umbilical. The bellman does this, and also serves as standby diver. The buoyancy of the air space may have to be compensated by ballast, as the bell must be negatively buoyant during normal operation.

=== Diver ladders ===
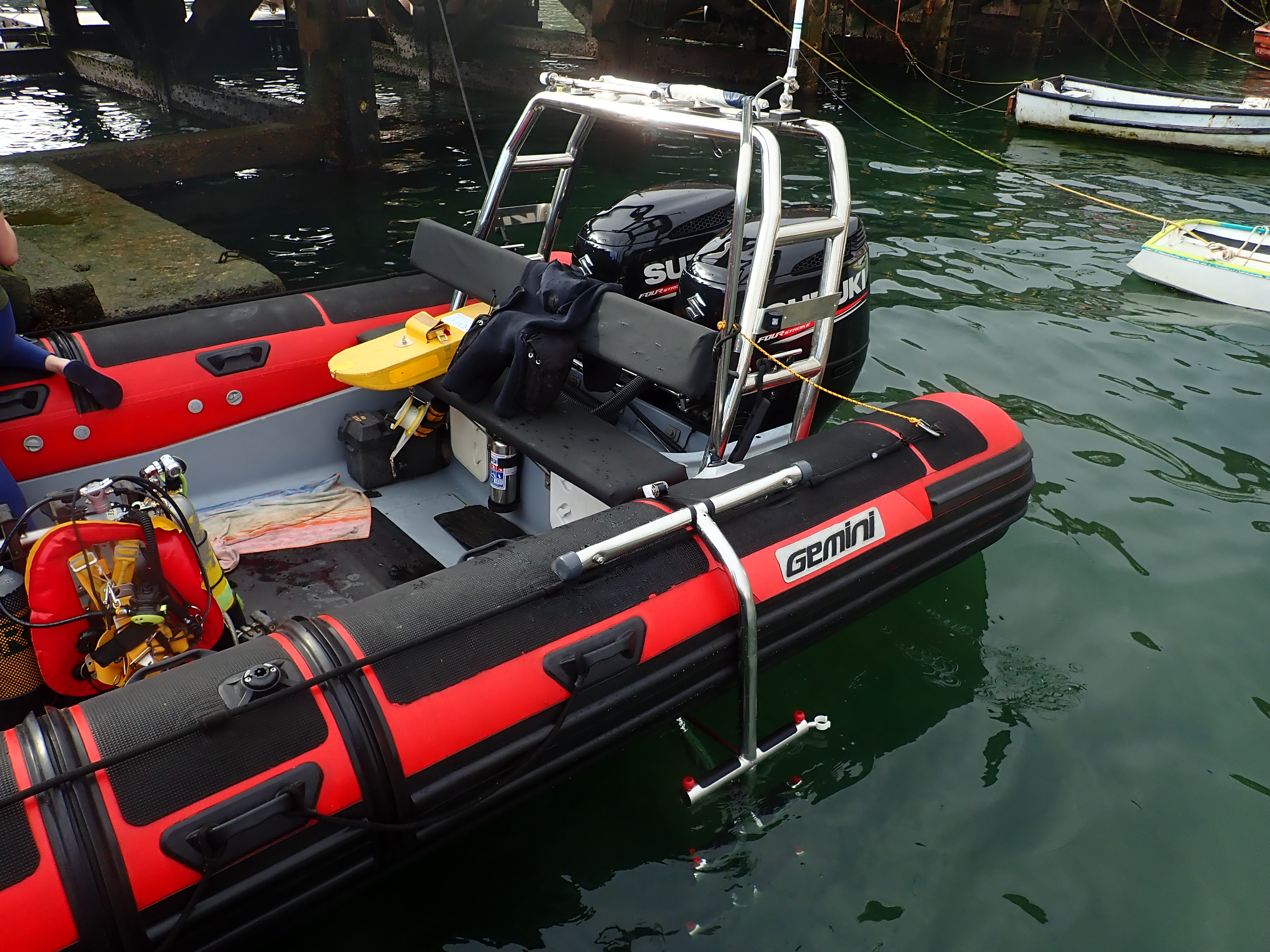
dive boat ladder that allows boarding without removing fins

For some applications, dive boat ladders that allow the diver to ascend without removing the fins are preferred. When there is a lot of relative motion between the diver and ladder, it can become difficult to safely remove fins, then get onto the ladder, and not lose the fins. A ladder that can be climbed with fins on the feet avoids this problem. A ladder that slopes at an angle of about 15° from the vertical reduces the load on the arms.

If a ladder must be climbed in full equipment, suitable handholds to brace the diver while climbing are necessary for safety. This also applies if the divers need to climb down a ladder wearing dive gear, and they may need to turn around at the top of the ladder. In the general case, the vessel will be moving in a seaway while the diver is boarding.

=== Dive platforms and diver lifts ===
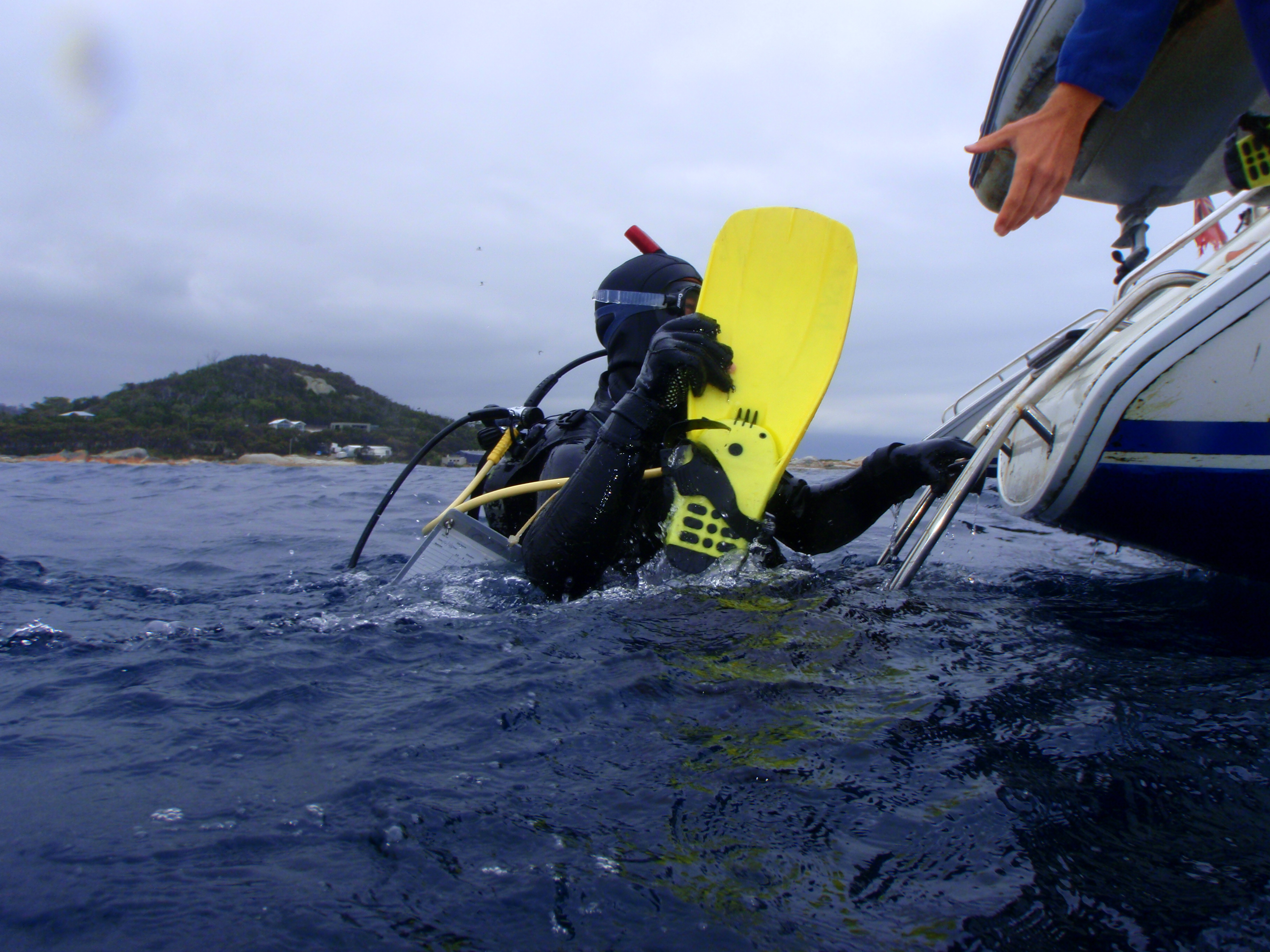
Exiting water by stern platform ladder on a sailing catamaran. This ladder has rungs between two stiles, requiring removal of fins in the water.

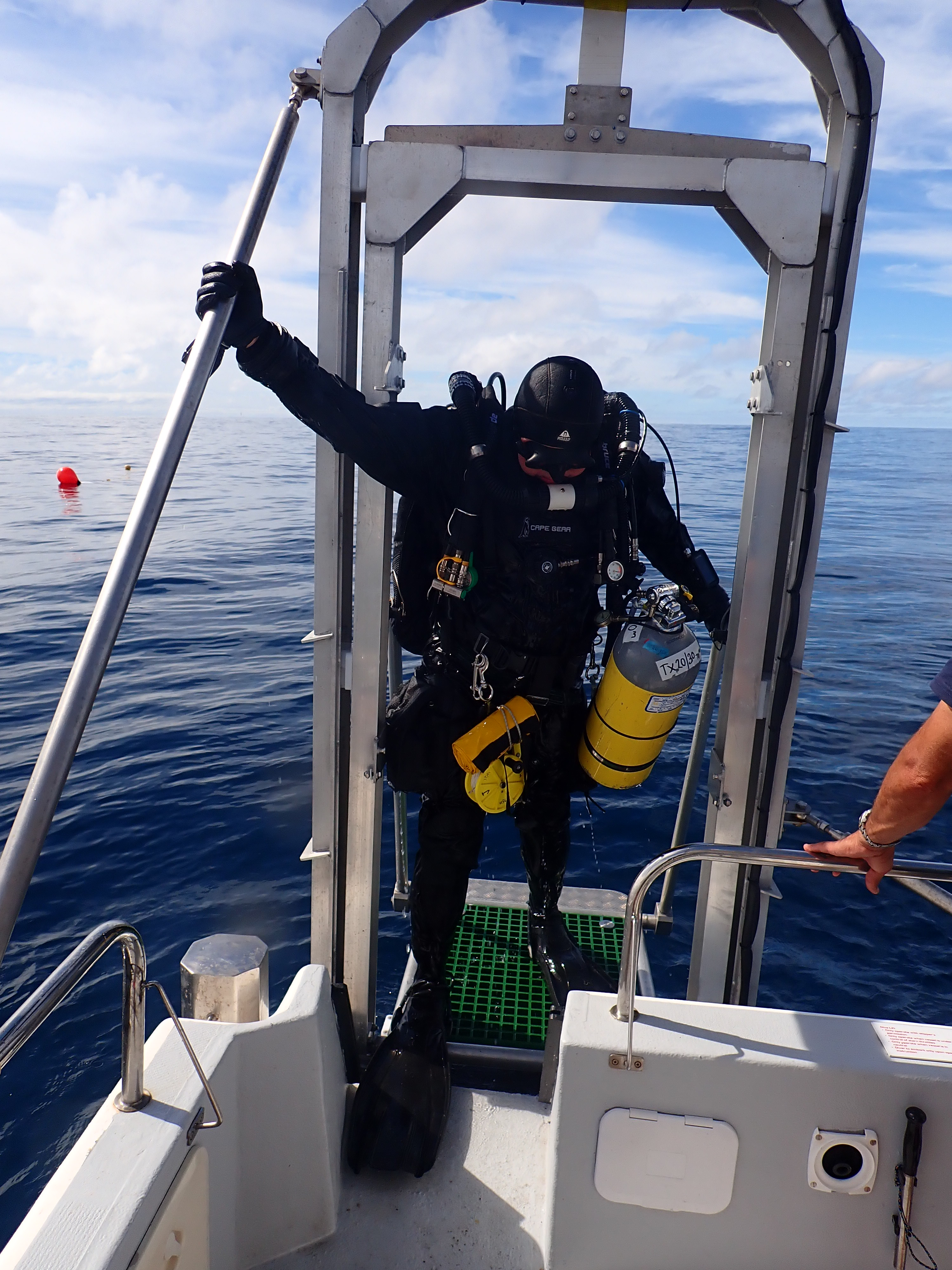
Transom mounted electric diver lift

A dive platform, or swim platform, is a near horizontal surface on a dive boat that gives more convenient access to the water than the deck. It may be large enough for several divers to use simultaneously, or just enough for a single diver. The platform may be fixed, folding, or arranged to lower divers into the water and lift them out again, in which case it is known as a diver lift. Most dive platforms are mounted at the stern, usually on the transom, at a height a short distance above the waterline. They are easily flooded by a following sea, and are self-draining.

Fixed and folding platforms are generally provided with ladders which can be folded or lifted out of the water when not in use. They are also equipped with steps or ladders from the platform to the deck, while lifting platforms may be sufficiently immersible for the divers to swim directly over the platform and stand up to be lifted to a level where they can walk off onto the deck. Lifts are commonly mounted on the transom, or on the side of the boat. Handrails while using steps, ladders and lifts, when crossing or waiting on the platform, or making adjustments to equipment are a valuable safety adjunct as the platform will often be moving when in use, and the divers will usually be encumbered by heavy and bulky diving equipment. Barriers to protect occupants from pinch point hazards may be necessary when there are moving parts. The utility of a lift is enhanced if the diver can use it without having to remove any equipment in the water or on the platform, so an upper position level with the working deck and sufficient space to walk onto the deck fully kitted is preferable.

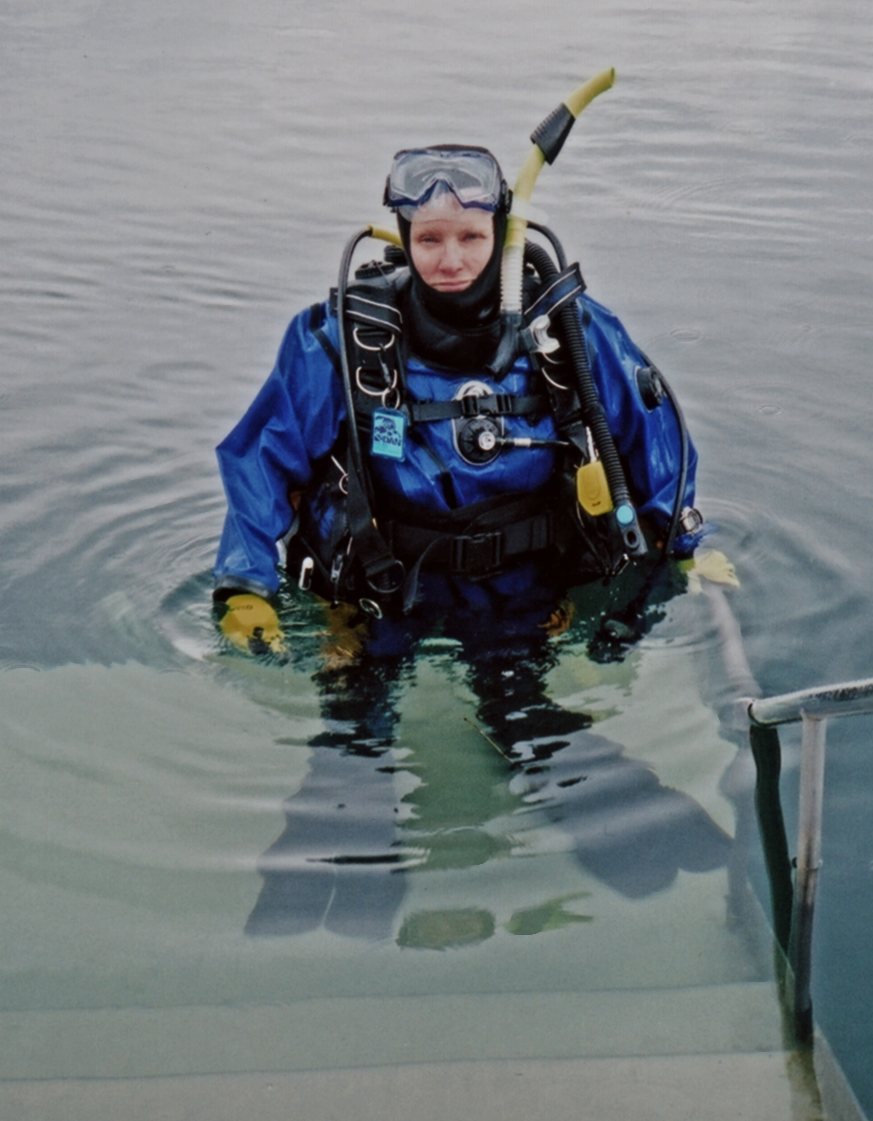
Aluminium dive platform at a flooded quarry

=== Recovery of an incapacitated diver ===
Professional divers may be required to wear a harness suitable for lifting the diver out of the water in an emergency, and there will usually be an emergency recovery plan and the necessary extraction equipment and personnel available. Recreational divers are not usually required to make any special provisions for an emergency, but recreational diving service providers may have a duty of care to their customers to provide for reasonably foreseeable emergencies with practicable facilities. There may be a regional or membership organisation standard or code of practice. Recovering an incapacitated diver from the water and providing first aid on the boat would usually be considered an expected level of care from a professional service provider.

Recreational divers are not required to wear lifting rated harness, so other plans should be in place. These often necessitate removing equipment from the diver, and the risk of losing the equipment. Details of methods to recover a diver into a boat will vary depending on the geometry of the boat.

== Tools ==
=== Tool bags, pockets and lanyards ===
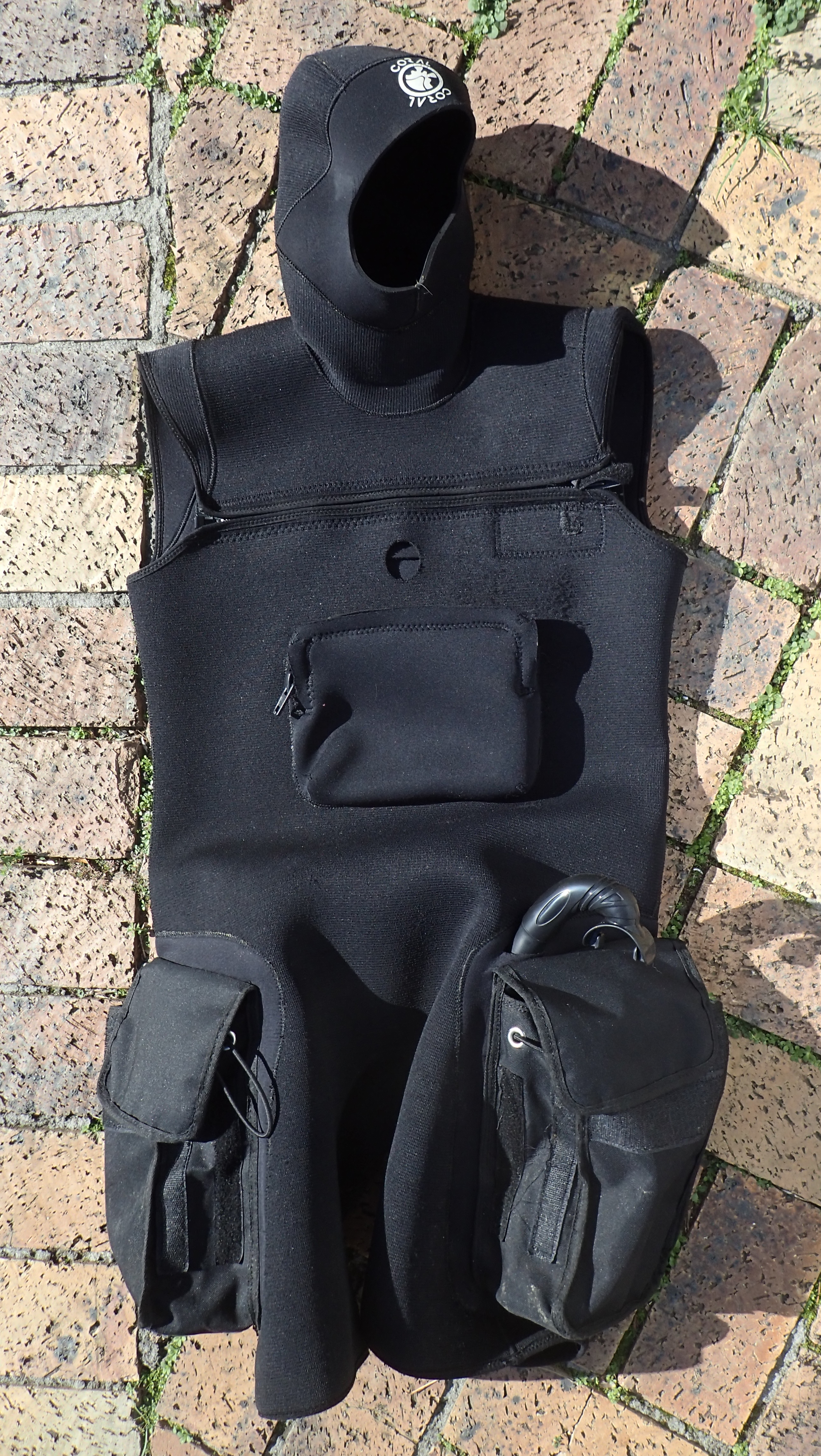
Hooded tunic with cargo pockets

== Checklists ==
Checklists for preparation of the dive and diving equipment are regarded as important safety tools, and are mandatory in some circumstances. There are several design factors which affect the effectiveness of checklists.

The design of a checklist should fit the purpose of the list. If a checklist is perceived as a top-down means to control behaviour by the organisational hierarchy it is more likely to be rejected and fail in its purpose. A checklist perceived as helping the operator to save time and reduce error is likely to be better accepted. This is more likely to happen when the user is involved in the development of the checklist.

Rae et al. (2018) define safety clutter as "the accumulation and persistence of 'safety' work that does not contribute to operational safety", and state that "when 'safety' rules impose a significant and unnecessary burden on the performance of everyday activities, both work and safety suffer".

An objective in checklist design that it should promote a positive attitude towards the use of the checklist by the operators. For this to happen it must be realistic, convenient and not be regarded as a nuisance. A checklist should be designed to describe and facilitate a physical procedure that is accepted by the operators as necessary, effective, efficient and convenient.

== See also ==
- Human factors in diving safety
- Ergonomics – Designing systems to suit their users
- History of underwater diving – Developments over time in the human activity
- Diving equipment – Equipment used to facilitate underwater diving
- Timeline of diving technology – Chronological list of notable events in the history of underwater diving equipment
