= Buoyancy compensator (diving) =

Equipment for controlling the buoyancy of a diver

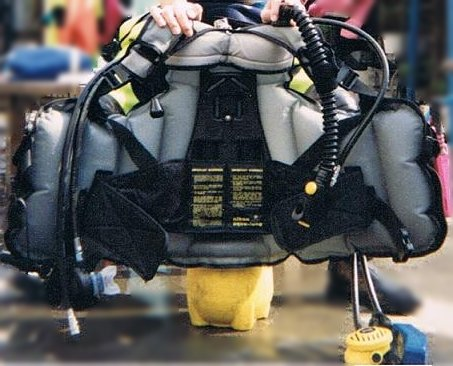
- Jacket type BC on diving cylinder
- Acronym: BC or BCD
- Other names: Buoyancy control device
- Uses: To adjust and control the overall buoyancy of the diver
- Related items: Backplate and wing

A buoyancy compensator (BC), also called a buoyancy control device (BCD), stabilizer, stabilisor, stab jacket, wing or adjustable buoyancy life jacket (ABLJ), depending on design, is a type of diving equipment which is worn by divers to establish neutral buoyancy underwater and positive buoyancy at the surface, when needed.

The buoyancy is usually controlled by adjusting the volume of gas in an inflatable bladder, which is filled with ambient pressure gas from the diver's primary breathing gas cylinder via a low-pressure hose from the regulator first stage, directly from a small cylinder dedicated to this purpose, or from the diver's mouth through the oral inflation valve. Ambient pressure bladder buoyancy compensators can be broadly classified as having the buoyancy primarily in front, surrounding the torso, or behind the diver. This affects the ergonomics, and to a lesser degree, the safety of the unit. They can also be broadly classified as having the buoyancy bladder as an integral part of the construction, or as a replaceable component supported inside the structural body.

The buoyancy compensator requires a significant amount of skill and attention to operate, because control is entirely manual, adjustment is required throughout the dive as weight reduces due to gas consumption, and buoyancy of the diving suit and BC generally varies with depth. Fine buoyancy adjustment can be done by breath control on open circuit, reducing the amount of actual BC volume adjustment needed, and a skilled diver will develop the ability to adjust volume to maintain neutral buoyancy while remaining aware of the surroundings and performing other tasks. The buoyancy compensator is both an important safety device when used correctly and a significant hazard when misused or malfunctioning.

The ability to control trim effectively is dependent on both appropriate buoyancy distribution and ballast weight distribution. This too is a skill acquired by practice, and is facilitated by minimising the required BC gas volume by correct weighting.

== Function ==
The buoyancy compensator is used by ambient pressure divers using underwater breathing apparatus to adjust buoyancy underwater or at the surface within the range of slightly negative to slightly positive, to allow neutral buoyancy to be maintained throughout the depth range of the planned dive, and to compensate for changes in weight due to breathing gas consumption during the dive. Where staged cylinders are used, it may also be used to compensate for weight changes when dropping and retrieving these cylinders. Variations in the buoyancy of wetsuits depend on the volume and density of the suit and the ambient pressure, but for thick suits at depth it can be in the order of 10 kg. Variations in the buoyancy of dry suits should be compensated by maintaining a constant volume of gas inside the suit, by manual addition and a combination of automatic and manual dumping, independently of the adjustments to the buoyancy compensator made to compensate for gas usage.

== Scope of application ==
The buoyancy compensator is a standard item of scuba diving equipment, though not always necessary, and an optional item for surface-supplied diving, where neutral or positive buoyancy may not be necessary or desirable. Breathhold divers do not have a gas supply to operate a buoyancy compensator, so they cannot use them, though they may wear an inflatable vest lifejacket for positive buoyancy at the surface. Atmospheric pressure diving suits may use a trim tank similar to that on a submarine for small adjustments, but can be ballasted to be almost precisely neutral, and are virtually incompressible within their designed operating range.

Accurate and reliable depth control is necessary for safe decompression. The surface-supplied diver has the option to use the umbilical for depth control with the assistance of the line tender, and a tethered scuba diver can use the lifeline in the same way. Similarly, any diver using a shotline or jackstay to navigate between the surface and the work site can use it for depth control, making a buoyancy compensator non-essential provided the diver can find the shotline when needed.

In most recreational and professional scuba, neutral buoyancy during most of the dive is necessary or desirable, as it gives the diver enhanced mobility and maneuverability, and allows the diver to avoid contact with delicate benthic organisms, and to fin without disturbing sediment which can rapidly reduce visibility. For this function a buoyancy compensator is necessary.

Positive buoyancy at the surface is a safety requirement for any diver who must swim to or from the point of descent or surfacing, but this does not need to be precisely controllable buoyancy.

The buoyancy compensator is intended to control buoyancy of a diver and their personal diving equipment, including stage and bailout cylinders, and for minor additional equipment such as reels, cameras and instruments that are lightweight or near neutral buoyancy. It is not a buoyant lifting device for heavy tools and equipment. If a diving task requires the diver to work heavy, it is almost always better, and always safer, to use surface supplied equipment.

If used by saturation divers to allow mid-water work, precautions must be taken to limit possible uncontrolled upward excursion. This may be possible by limiting excursion umbilical length or using an underwater tending point.

== Operating principle ==
A buoyancy compensator works by adjusting the average density of the diver and their attached equipment to be greater than, equal to, or less than the density of the diving medium. This can be done in either of two ways:

- Variable volume, or inflatable: The volume of a flexible device can be varied by adding or removing ambient pressure gas, which has a relatively low density, or
- Variable density or compressible: The density of a rigid device can be varied by compressing or expanding the internal gas by adding or removing incompressible diving medium, which has a relatively high density.

As of 2025, the overwhelming majority of BCs are variable volume types, inflated by gas at ambient pressure, and subject to unstable buoyancy variation with depth changes, but the variable density type is in use and available from some retailers who also offer the appropriate training.

=== Variable volume type ===
The common type of buoyancy compensator increases buoyancy by adding gas at ambient pressure to a flexible airtight bladder, thereby increasing the volume, and decreases buoyancy by releasing the gas into the water. This volume of gas will compress or expand as the ambient pressure varies with depth, following Boyle's law, and therefore the buoyancy of the system will increase and decrease in proportion to the absolute pressure variation and the volume of gas in the bladder. The variation of buoyancy for a given change of depth will be greater near the surface than at greater depth and greater for a large volume of gas than for a small volume. The range of depths for which the diver can compensate for these changes by voluntary adjustment of lung volume while breathing effectively is therefore dependent on the volume of gas in the bladder and the nominally neutral depth, where breathing at normal tidal volume of about 500 ml results in approximate dynamic equilibrium, and the diver remains at that depth without additional effort. This type of buoyancy compensator functions by increasing buoyancy from the most stable state, which is empty, so weighting is done for neutral buoyancy at the condition of least mass, which is at the end of the dive with the cylinders empty, at which point the diver should be able to stay at the last decompression stop without physical effort.

A few illustrative examples are presented here. They are simplified but numerically realistic:

Example 1a: A diver should be neutrally buoyant at the last decompression stop until breathing gas runs out, so that full use can be made in an emergency of all gas carried. At this point the BC should be empty if weighting is correct, and a dry suit should be at nominal inflation for the undersuit - just enough gas so that the undersuit is at optimum loft for insulation. A wetsuit will be very slightly compressed, so nearly at maximum buoyancy. An empty BC is incompressible and is not affected by depth changes.

Example 1b: If the same diver is decompressing at 3 m with reserve gas in all cylinders, the gas in the BC must support the weight of that reserve gas. A recreational diver with 50 bar of air or nitrox carried in a 12 litre cylinder will have about 0.780 kg of gas, and therefore about 0.78 litres of gas in the BC. A depth change of 1 m upwards will change ambient absolute pressure from 1.3 bar to 1.2 bar so the gas in the BC will expand to 1.3/1.2 × 0.78 = 0.845 litres, a difference of 0.065 litres, which can easily be compensated by reducing lung volume by that amount to stabilise, and a bit more to start sinking back to stop depth. Suit gas will also expand in the same proportion, and is likely to have a larger volume to start, so in practice more gas must be exhaled to get back to depth.

Example 1c: The same diver, but 2 kg overweighted, decompressing at 3 m with 50 bar reserve in a 12 litre cylinder will need about an additional 2 litres of gas in the BC for neutral buoyancy. The same depth change of 1 m upwards will increase the gas volume in the BC to 1.3/1.2 × 2.78 = 3.012 litres, a difference of 0.232 litres.

Example 2: The same diver as in example 1 at 30 m depth at the beginning of the dive with 200 bar in the 12 litre cylinder has about 3.1 kg gas in the cylinder, requiring about 3.1 litres of gas in the BC for neutral buoyancy. At this depth a depth reduction of 1 m will increase the gas volume in the BC to 4/3.9 × 3.1 = 3.18 litres, a difference of 0.08 litres.

Example 3a: A technical diver in a 7 mm wetsuit at the beginning of a dive to 60 m with 200 bar of normoxic trimix 20/30 bottom gas in a manifolded twin 12 litre set with 2 × 11 litre sling cylinders filled to 200 bar with nitrox decompression gases will be carrying about 10 kg of gas and have lost about 6 kg of buoyancy through suit compression, so will need to inflate the BCD with about 16 litres of gas to compensate. At this depth a 1 m decrease of depth will cause the gas in the BC to expand to 7/6.9 × 16 = 16.23 litres, a difference of 0.23 litres.

Example 3b: The same technical diver aborts the dive nearly immediately on reaching 60 m and surfaces with a short decompression obligation of 3 minutes at 3 m. Their back gas is down to 150 bar and the deco gas is unused when they reach the 3 m stop. The suit will have regained almost all of its buoyancy and they are carrying about 7.5 kg of gas so will need about 7.5 litres of gas in the BC to compensate. At this depth a 1 m decrease of depth will cause the gas in the BC to expand to 1.3/1.2 × 7.5 = 8.125 litres, a difference of 0.625 litres.

=== Variable density type ===
An alternative method of adjusting the buoyancy of the diver is by varying the density of a rigid container of constant displaced volume, by adjusting the volume of added water in a normally gas filled space. This approach can also be described as buoyancy reduction, as opposed to buoyancy addition when gas is added to a flexible ambient pressure space. Such variable buoyancy pressure vessels are used by submersibles and submarines for fine buoyancy and trim control. Water from the surroundings is injected into the tank to decrease buoyancy by ambient pressure difference or by a pump, depending on the internal gas pressure. Water can be removed in a similar way to increase buoyancy. As the tank is rigid and effectively incompressible within the range of diving depths for which it is intended, buoyancy changes due to depth variation during the dive are negligible, and the diver only needs to adjust the buoyancy to account for gas usage and volume variation of the diving suit.

One way this can be done is by pumping water into a scuba cylinder, using a flexible bladder to keep the gas and water separate, which requires a cylinder made for this purpose, with a water inlet to the space around the internal bladder, connected to a high-pressure pump and control valve system. If the weights have been optimised for the equipment, and the diver is nearly at neutral buoyancy at the start of the dive, very little water needs to be added at the start of the dive, so the gas pressure is not greatly increased. More water is pumped in during the dive to compensate for the mass of gas used, but by this time the pressure will have dropped considerably. A small amount of residual gas pressure on surfacing will be enough to eject the ballast water to establish positive buoyancy. If this system is used with additional sling mounted bailout or decompression cylinders a larger volume of water will be needed to compensate the additional gas usage, and the gas pressure in the buoyancy compensating cylinder will rise a bit more. The Avelo system uses this mechanism, with a rechargeable battery powered pump unit which is demountable from the cylinder.

This system is inherently more stable with hydrostatic pressure variation, and decreases buoyancy from the initial state, which is with a full cylinder of gas at the start of the dive. To minimise the pressure rise caused by pumping ballast water into the cylinder when it is full, weighting is done for near neutral buoyancy at the start of the dive, with just enough positive buoyancy to safely swim at the surface with a full tank, and pump in a relatively small volume of water to descend, which is periodically increased during the dive to compensate for mass loss of breathing gas. After surfacing, the added mass of water is released to give a comfortable positive buoyancy and minimise equipment weight when getting out of the water. If using a dry suit the initial positive buoyancy at the surface could be controlled by suit inflation in excess of the amount needed for undergarment loft, allowing descent by dumping from the suit.

The depth range in which effectively stable neutral buoyancy can be maintained is inversely proportional to the volume of ambient pressure gas spaces in the diver's equipment (the lung volume is automatically compensated through normal breathing, and the mask is both small and reflexively maintained at constant volume by most divers). When an incompressible buoyancy compensator is used, almost all of the variable volume is in the diving suit, and the depth range of effectively neutral buoyancy is maximised. A diver without a diving suit would be effectively neutrally buoyant over the full depth range of the dive, and only need to adjust buoyancy for mass loss as gas is used.

A superficially similar system was used in the Dacor (CV Nautilus) system of the 1970s, where the volume of ambient pressure gas in the rigid shell was maintained by a demand regulator automatically sensing a pressure deficit between the internal and external pressures and an automatic dump valve to release internal overpressure, much like the volume control of a rebreather loop by automatic diluent valve (ADV) and overpressure valve, but this reduced buoyancy by flooding the shell with water and increased the buoyancy by adding gas at ambient pressure from the breathing gas supply, rather than reducing the stored gas volume by compressing the gas. Water was added to or removed from the shell to compensate for suit compression and gas use by a manually operated valve. An inherent problem with this system is that the diver must still manually compensate for changes of buoyancy due to suit compression and expansion when changing depth, so the advantages are less marked when used with thick, compressible, diving suits.

== Configurations ==
There are three main configurations of inflatable bladder buoyancy compensation device based on buoyancy distribution:

=== Adjustable buoyancy life jacket ===
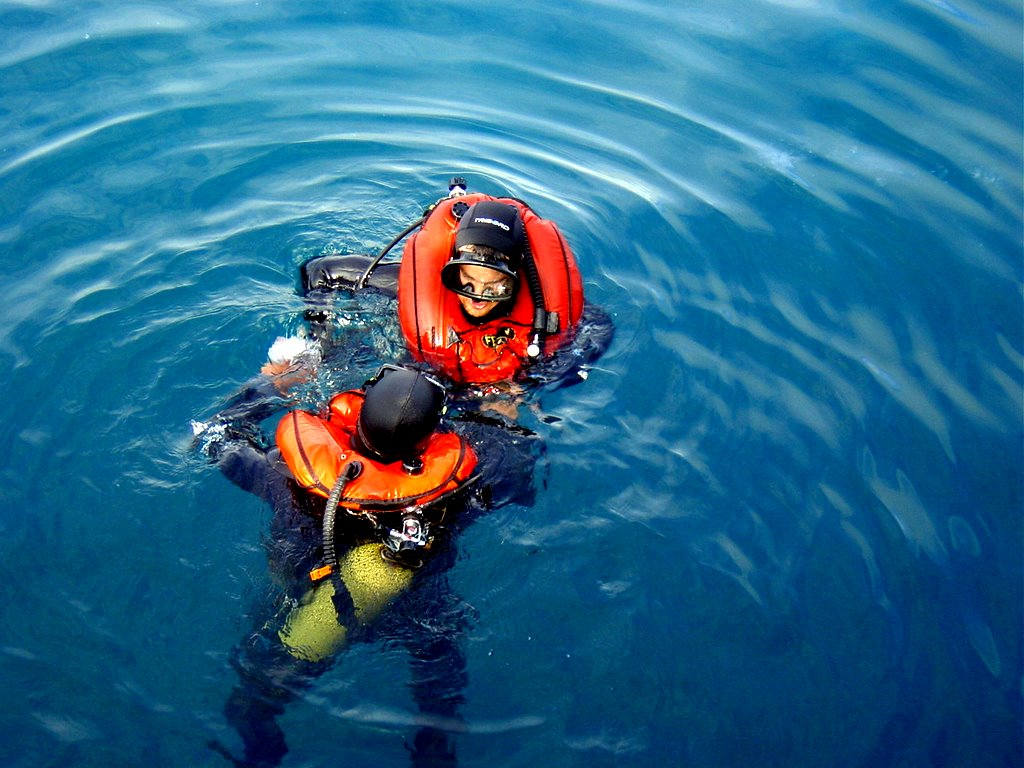
Surfaced divers with inflated horsecollar BCs

An adjustable buoyancy life jacket (ABLJ) is fitted around the neck and over the chest, secured by straps around the waist and usually between the legs. They are sometimes referred to as "horse collars" because of their resemblance, and are historically derived from the inflatable underwater demolition team (UDT) vest or Mae West life jacket issued to World War II flyers and divers.

They were developed in the 1960s and have been largely superseded by wing and vest type BCs, primarily because the buoyancy is concentrated in front of the diver when full, and behind the neck when partially filled, producing a tendency to shift the diver's centre of buoyancy towards the head with inflation, which adversely affects the diver's trim underwater. The ABLJ's location on the diver's chest and round the neck provides the best buoyancy distribution of the buoyancy compensator designs when it comes to floating a distressed, fatigued or unconscious diver face-up on the surface in the event of a problem. They do not normally provide good trim while immersed, as the centre of buoyancy of a horizontally trimmed diver will move towards the back of the neck when the bladder is inflated, inducing a head up trim, which can increase adverse impacts on the benthic environment.

The Dacor Seachute BC4 had unique upper and lower bladders. The upper bladder was around the neck and could be inflated by the Carbon dioxide cartridge for use as a surface life jacket. The lower bladder was over the diver's stomach area, and was inflated by LP gas from the regulator, for buoyancy control underwater. This arrangement provided better buoyancy distribution for trim control while diving than most other front inflation systems.

=== Wraparound buoyancy BCs ===
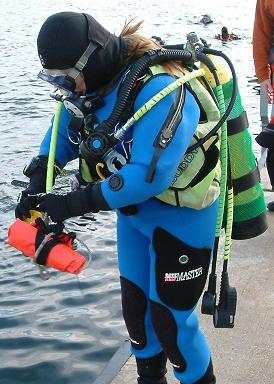
Diver wearing a stabiliser jacket

Vest BC, stab jacket, stabiliser jacket, stabilizer, waistcoat or (disparagingly) "Poodle Vest" BCs are inflatable vests worn by the diver around the upper torso, which incorporate the cylinder harness. The air bladder extends from the back around the diver's sides or over the diver's shoulders.

Wraparound bladders are favored by some divers because they make it easier to maintain upright attitude on the surface. However, some designs have a tendency to squeeze the diver's torso when inflated, and they are often bulky at the sides or front when fully inflated, and may lack sufficient volume to support a full technical rig with a thick wetsuit.

Vest BCs typically provide up to about 25 kilograms of buoyancy (depending on size) and are fairly comfortable to wear, if of the correct size and adjusted to fit the diver. Vest BCs are the most common type among recreational divers because they can integrate buoyancy control, weights, attachment points for auxiliary gear, and cylinder retention in a single piece of gear. The diver need only attach a cylinder and regulator set in order to have a complete scuba set. Some "tech-rec" (basically recreational with limited technical capability) vest BC's have the ability to carry multiple cylinders - Twin sets on the back, and sling cylinders at the sides, suspended from D-rings. The lack of flexibility of positioning the D-rings due to structural constraints on some designs is partly remedied by fitting larger numbers of D-rings, some of which may be in the right place for a given diver.

Three main wraparound configurations can be distinguished:

- The original stabilizer jacket patent by Scubapro featured a buoyancy bladder which allowed air flow around the arms and around the backpack – the trademarked 360° flow-through design. This was a complex bladder to manufacture.
- Over-the-shoulder bladder, separated under the arms, which has a centre of buoyancy fairly high on the body when fully inflated, which tends to hold the diver upright at the surface. These are bulky over the front of the torso, particularly in the shoulder and chest area, and relatively clear to the sides under the arms.
- With extensions of the bladder from the lower back forward under the arms, but separated at the shoulders, and no buoyancy on the upper chest, which has a lower centre of buoyancy when fully inflated, and tends to tilt the diver backwards when fully inflated at the surface. These can be very bulky under the arms when integrated weighting and/or pockets are added, and for smaller waisted divers, also to the front of the waist area, but are relatively clear in the chest and shoulder area. The "shell" or bladder casing is usually separate from the cummerbund, which can be snugly fitted while leaving the bladder a relatively loose fit around the torso, to avoid restricting breathing when fully inflated. However, the cummerbund is fitted over the abdomen near the diaphragm and if snugly fitted, may restrict abdominal breathing movement.

BC attachment systems are generally intended to limit the shifting of the BC as a result of the lifting forces, including minimizing the tendency to slide towards the head when the diver is upright while the bladder is inflated. If the diver is wearing a weight belt, this will pull in the opposite direction to BC lift, and can result in the diver sagging down in the jacket when the diver is upright when floating at the surface. Solutions to this problem include the cummerbund (a broad adjustable waist band) and the crotch strap (a strap between the legs). The crotch strap, when adjusted correctly, is effective at preventing this shift, but may prevent the weight belt from falling clear of the diver if dropped in an emergency. Fitting the weight belt over the crotch strap after putting the BC on can be difficult. The cummerbund is an attempt to avoid this problem, as the weight belt can not be snagged on it in the same way, but the weight belt must then be worn either under the cummerbund, obstructing access to the buckle, or below the cummerbund. The effectiveness of a cummerbund depends on a waistline which is smaller than the circumference of the upper torso, and it may constrain free breathing if fitted too tightly.

This tendency of the inflated BC to shift towards the head is less of a problem when the weights are carried in integrated weight pockets on the BC, but it may then have a tendency to slide towards the head when deflated on an inverted diver underwater. This is less of a problem for the average recreational diver, who does not spend much time head down underwater, but can increase the difficulty of recovering from a dry-suit inversion where the air in the suit flows to the feet and the weights in the BC shift towards the head. A crotch strap will prevent this.

==== Jump jacket ====
A special case of the jacket type buoyancy control device is the A.P. Valves Jump Jacket Mk.4, which is designed for use by surface-supplied divers. The Mk.4 was designed to be used with the Kirby Morgan lightweight helmets, and is primarily intended for buoyancy control with umbilical supplied gas from the main gas feed via the helmet bailout block, which also provides emergency inflation from the bailout cylinder. The system can also provide cross-connection from one diver's main gas to a second diver's helmet, and pneumo gas emergency supply to a second diver. The jump jacket includes a recovery harness, helmet safety harness and backpack for the bailout set. It is suitable for use on closed bell, wet bell, and dives without a transport platform.

=== Back inflation ===
Back inflation buoyancy compensators are typified by the stainless steel backplate and wing arrangement popular with technical divers, but other arrangements are also available. Wings or Backplate and wing consist of an inflatable bladder worn between the diver's back and the cylinder(s). Invented by Greg Flanagan in 1979 for North Florida cave divers, and further developed by William Hogarth Main, the back plate and wing configuration is not a recent development, but has gained popularity because of suitability for technical diving where it is often used, as the technical diver often carries multiple cylinders on his back and/or clipped to D-rings on the harness webbing. The back-mount cylinders or rebreather assembly are fastened over the buoyancy bladder to a backplate which is strapped to the diver by the harness. The wing design frees the divers sides and front and allows for a large volume bladder with high lift capacity (60 lbs /30 liter wings are not uncommon). Some designs use elasticated webbing or bungee cords around the bladder to constrict the bladder when not inflated, although there is dispute regarding the safety and utility of this addition. The distance between boltholes on the centreline of the backplate has standardised at 11 inches (280 mm) between centres.

Other back inflation buoyancy compensators are more like the jacket style regarding the structure, attachment to the diver, and accessories, differing mainly in the bladder position, which is similar to a wing, being entirely behind the diver, without extensions to the sides or front. Back inflation BCs are less bulky at the sides but may have a tendency to float the diver tilted forward on the surface depending on weight and buoyancy distribution, which presents a possible hazard in an emergency if the diver is unconscious or otherwise unable to keep his or her head above the water.

A few short-lived rigid air compartment back inflation BCs were marketed in the 1970s, and the Avelo variable density system is back mounted.

A hybrid arrangement is also possible, which has most of the buoyancy in the back, but has a small amount to the sides below the arms.

==== Dual bladder buoyancy compensators ====
A small proportion of wing style buoyancy compensators have been produced with a dual bladder arrangement. The intention is that the secondary bladder is a backup in case of failure of the primary bladder. The basic principle is defensible, but the arrangement can present several additional hazards, some of which have caused life-threatening incidents. Safe management of a dual bladder system requires the diver to be aware of the inflation status of each bladder at all times, and to dump gas from the correct bladder or bladders during ascent to prevent a runaway buoyant ascent. Several arrangements have been tried with the intention of making the arrangement acceptably safe. One is to link the inflation and deflation valves together so that both bladders are always used in parallel. In practice this requires a custom modification of two inflator units so that they can be operated together with one hand, as there is no production unit with this function available. Pull dump valves must also be connected in a way that they reliably operate simultaneously in parallel, and the probability of an inlet valve malfunction is doubled as they are in parallel.

Another strategy is to have the inflator mechanisms on opposite sides of the body. As it is possible to inadvertently activate the inflation valve, and it can leak without the diver noticing until the buoyancy has increased significantly, this is only reliable if there is no low pressure inflation hose connected to the backup bladder, so that it can only be inflated orally, and then always inflate the primary using low pressure gas from the regulator. This can be taken a step further by having a different style of oral inflator valve on the secondary bladder.

Dual bladder buoyancy compensators are considered both unnecessary and unsafe in the DIR philosophy. Unnecessary in that there are simpler alternative methods available to a correctly rigged diver to compensate for a defective BC, and unsafe in that there is no obvious way to tell which bladder is holding air, and a leak into the secondary bladder may go unnoticed until the buoyancy has increased to the extent that the diver is unable to stop the ascent, while struggling to empty the air from the wrong bladder. Monitoring the air content of two bladders is unnecessary additional task loading, which distracts attention from other matters.

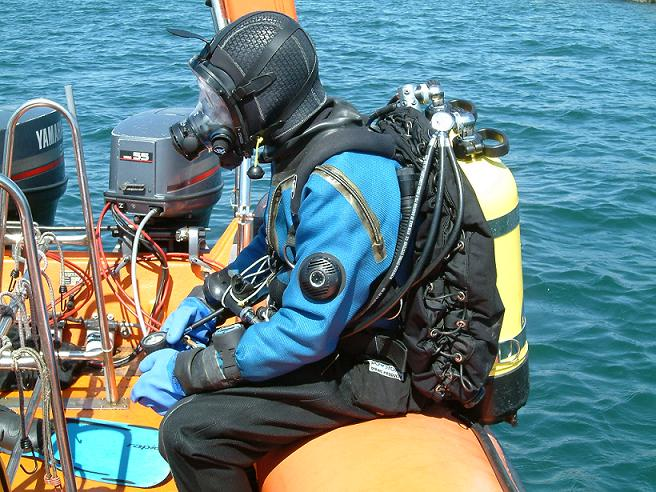
Diver wearing a wing buoyancy compensator

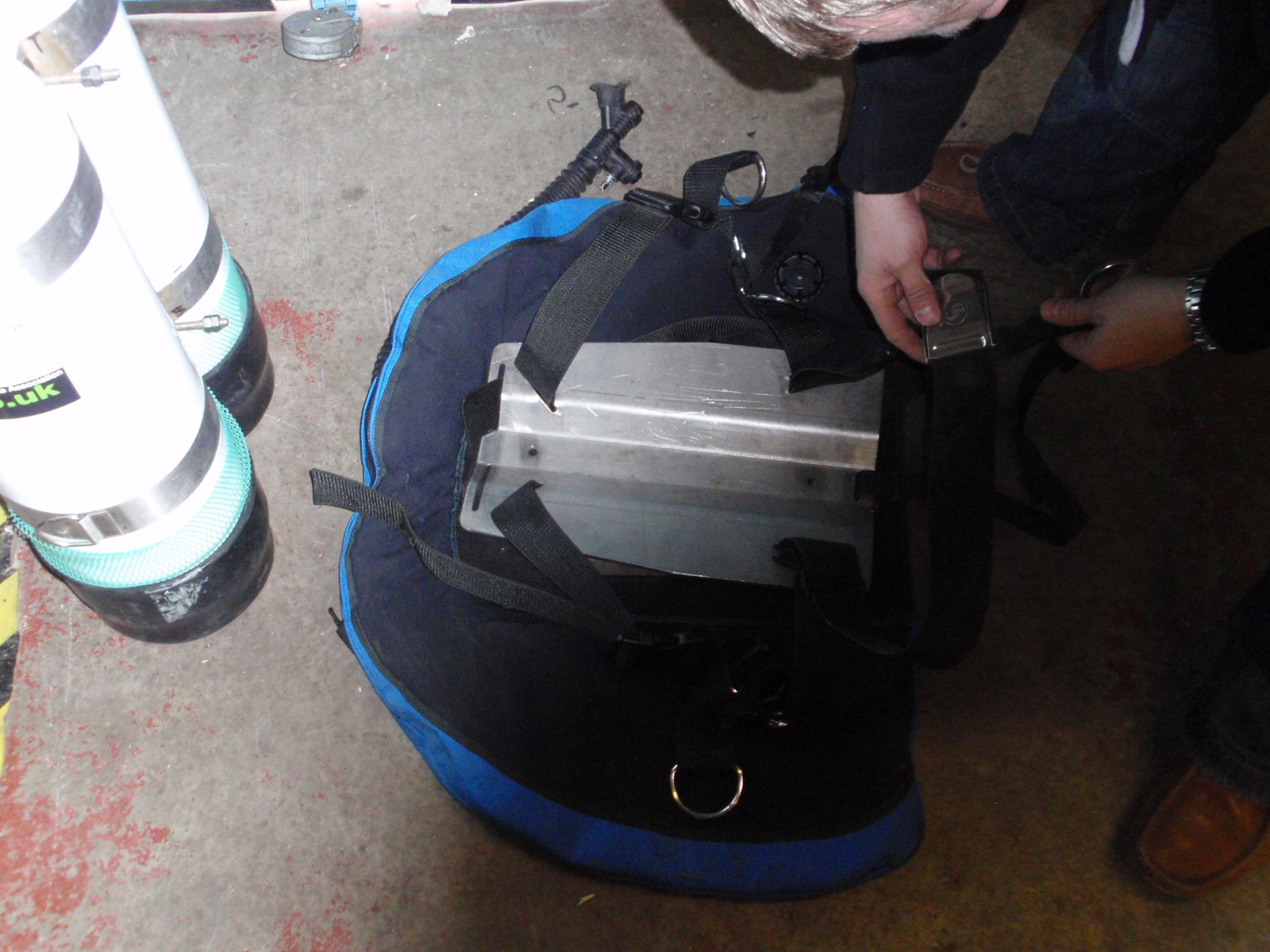
Wings for twin-cylinder set: the cylinders are fastened together by 2 metal bands which are bolted through the wing to the backplate

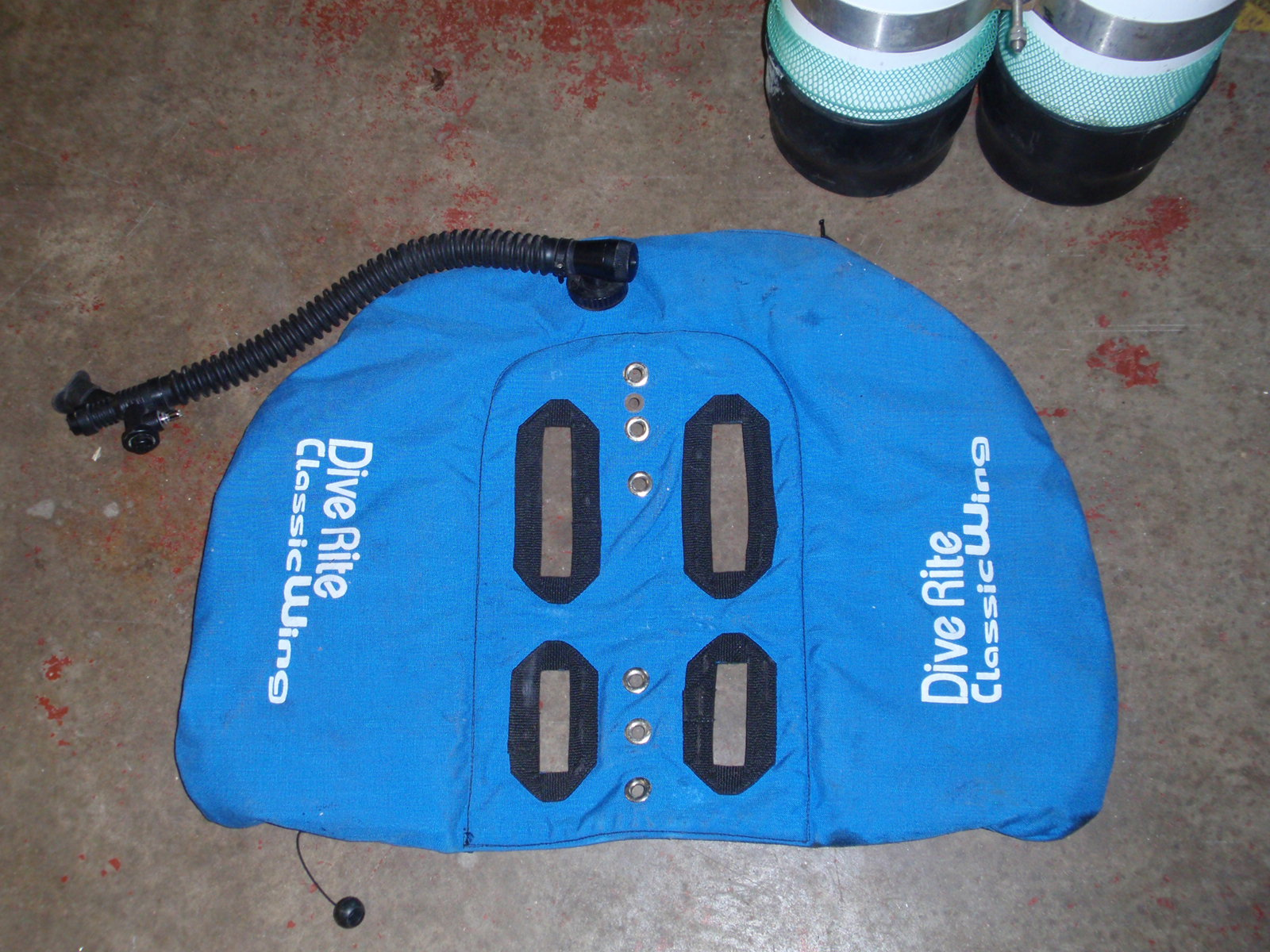
Bladder of a wing buoyancy compensator, showing the side which is away from the diver. The two pairs of slits allow use of cambands to hold a single cylinder

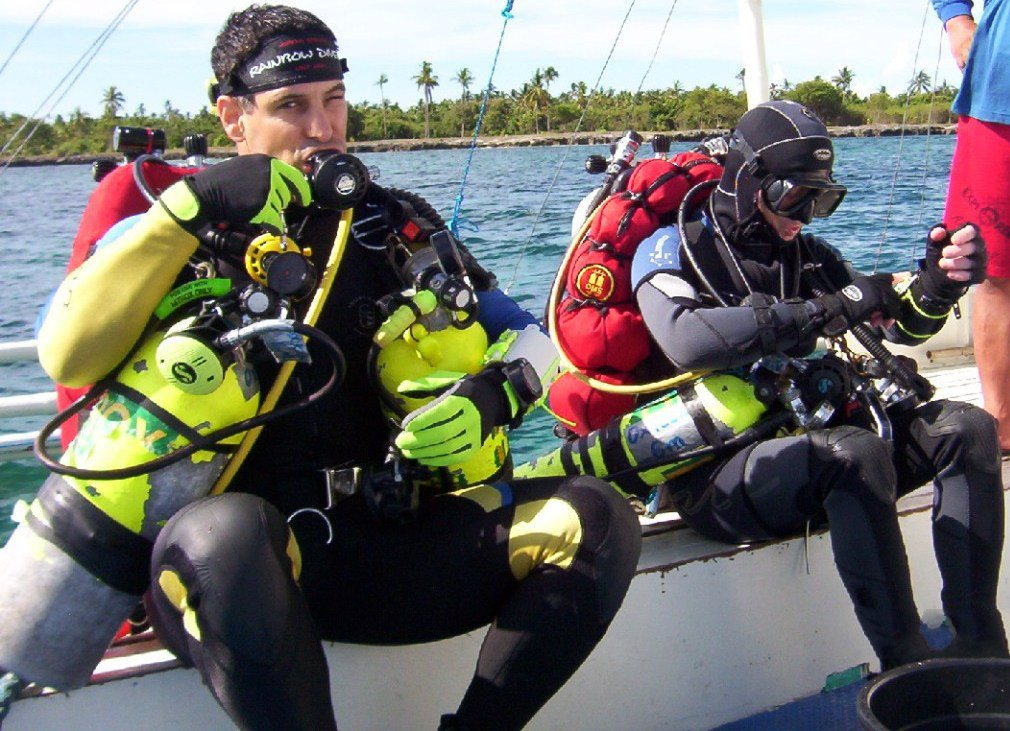
Divers preparing for a decompression dive using backplate and wing with sling mounted decompression gas cylinders.

==== Sidemount BCs ====
A variation on the back mounted buoyancy compensator is used without a backplate for side mount diving This arrangement is functionally similar to wearing the buoyancy compensator sandwiched between the cylinder(s) and backplate, but there is no backplate or back mounted cylinder. The buoyancy cell may be mounted between the sidemount harness and the diver, or on top of the harness. The sides of the bladder may be restrained from floating upwards when inflated by bungee cords clipped to the waistband in front of the diver or clipped to each other, forming an elastic belt across the front of the hips, well below the diaphragm. In this application, back mount keeps the inflated bladder from occupying the space at the diver's sides where the cylinders are suspended.

Some side mount harnesses are adaptable for use with a back mount cylinder as an option, without the rigid backplate.

=== Rebreather BCs ===
Buoyancy compensators are also used with rebreathers. In most cases back-mounted technical diving rebreathers use a wing type bladder integrated with the rebreather harness, with the bladder around the frame of the rebreather. Side mounted rebreathers tend to be suspended from the sides of side-mount harnesses, which include the buoyancy compensator.

=== Integrated with the scuba cylinder ===
The Avelo diving system uses the scuba cylinder as the buoyancy compenator in a unique configuration. Instead of adding gas volume to a compressible bladder, ballast weight in the form of ambient water is added to the interior of the scuba cylinder by a high pressure pump to reduce buoyancy. To allow for this, the cylinder has a secondary inlet at the bottom, an internal bladder to separate breathing gas from the ballast water, and a much higher maximum working pressure than most scuba cylinders to safely accommodate the increase in pressure when a full cylinder of gas is ballasted at the start of the dive. The manufacturers call this the "hydrotank", and the backpack containing the pump and power supply is called the "jetpack". As the cylinder is virtually incompressible and volume change is negligible, the volumetric buoyancy instability with depth change characteristic of variable volume BCDs is eliminated. During the dive, as breathing gas is consumed, more water is added to compensate for the lost weight of the gas. After surfacing, the ballast water is released from the cylinder by opening a drain valve, and the residual gas pressure will blow it out.

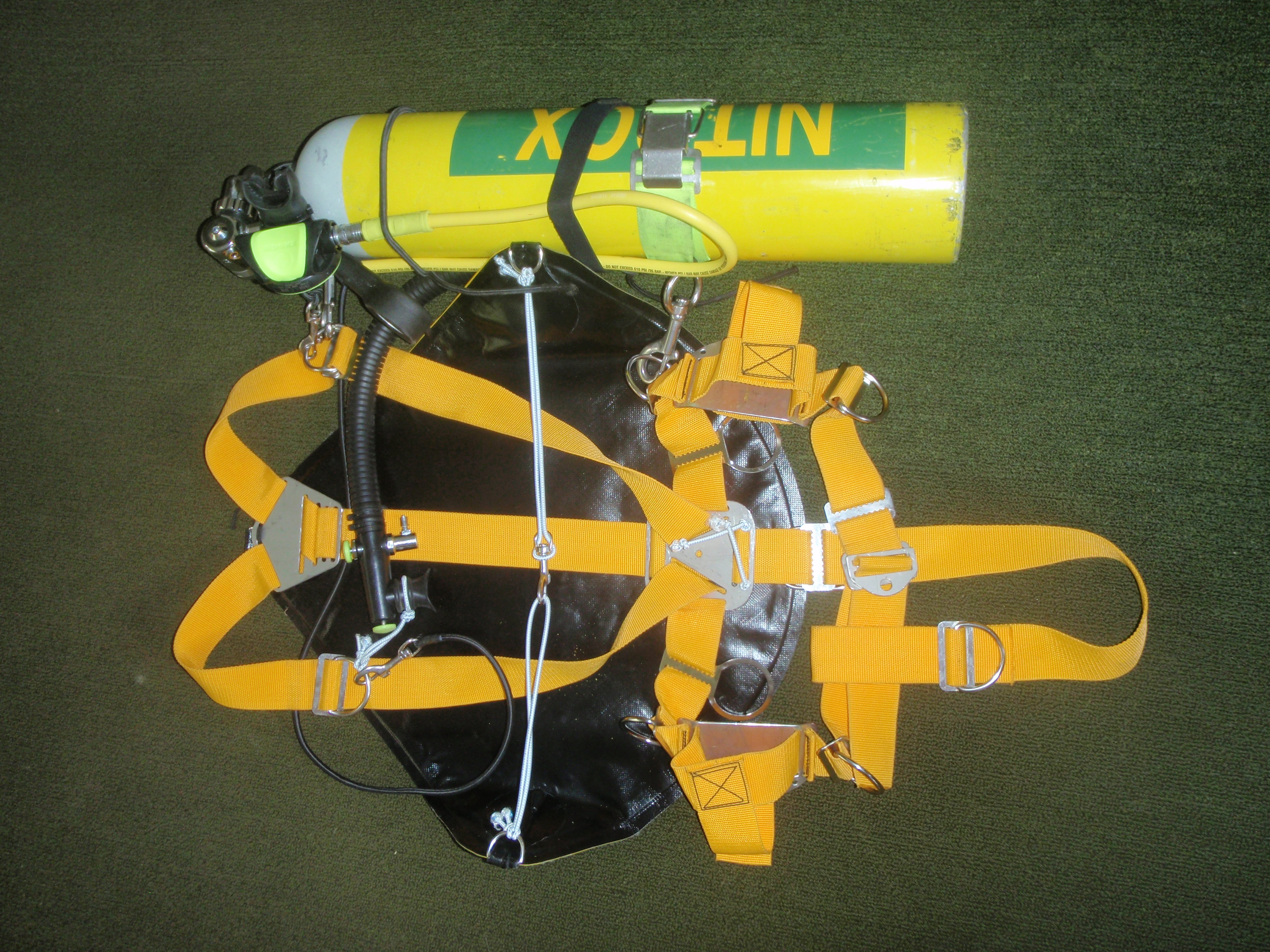
Minimalist sidemount harness showing webbing, sliders and D-rings, buoyancy compensator, integrated weight holders and cylinder

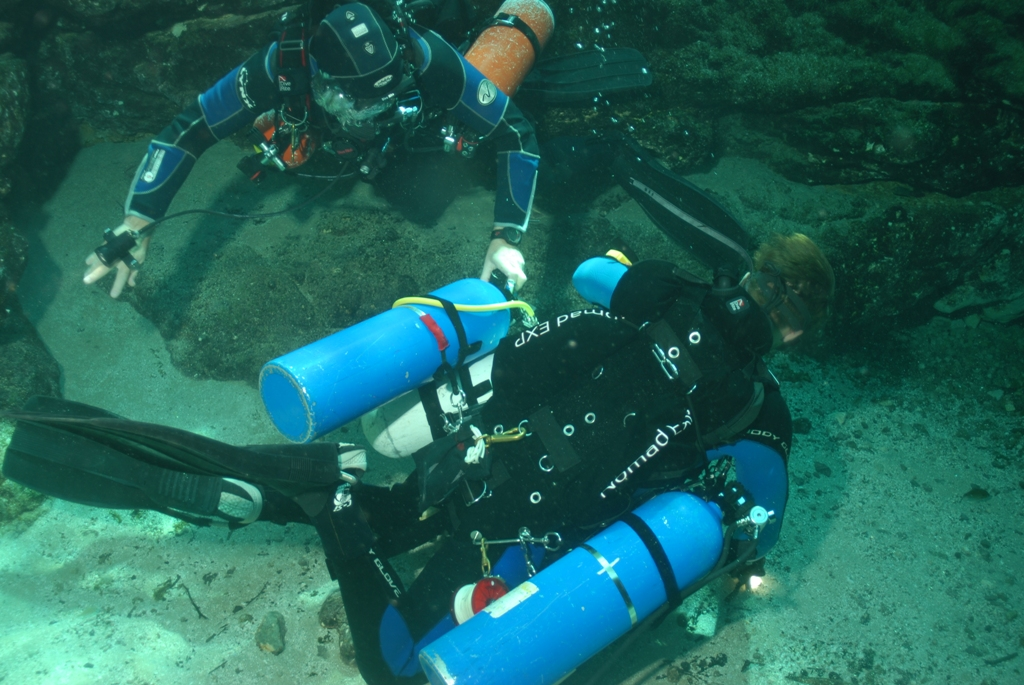
Top view of sidemount diver

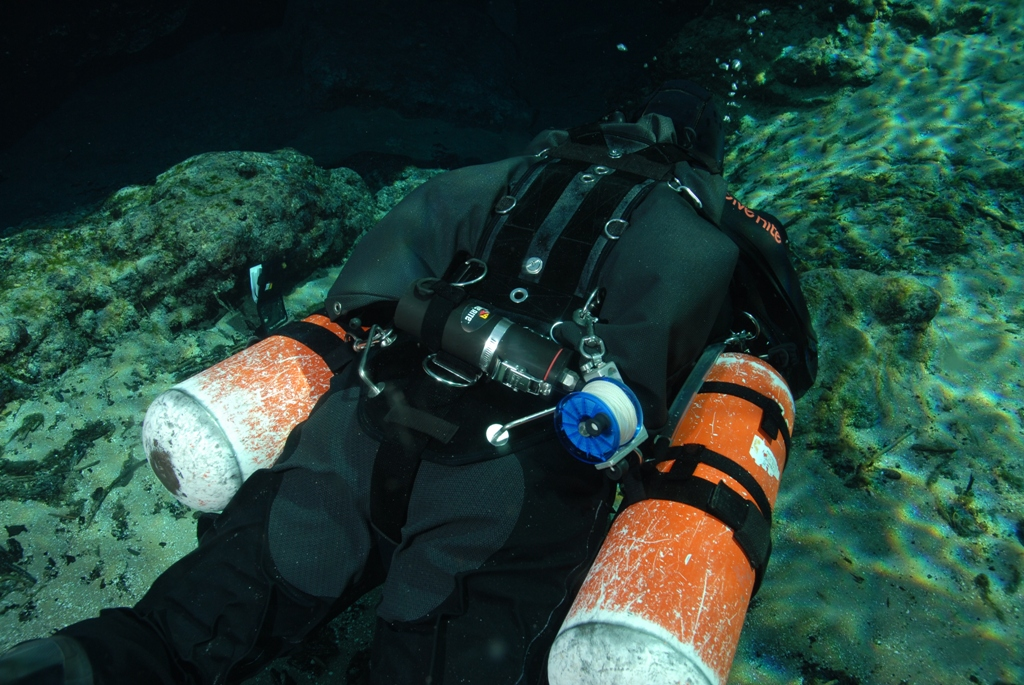
Sidemount diver in cave showing 2 cylinders and BC back view

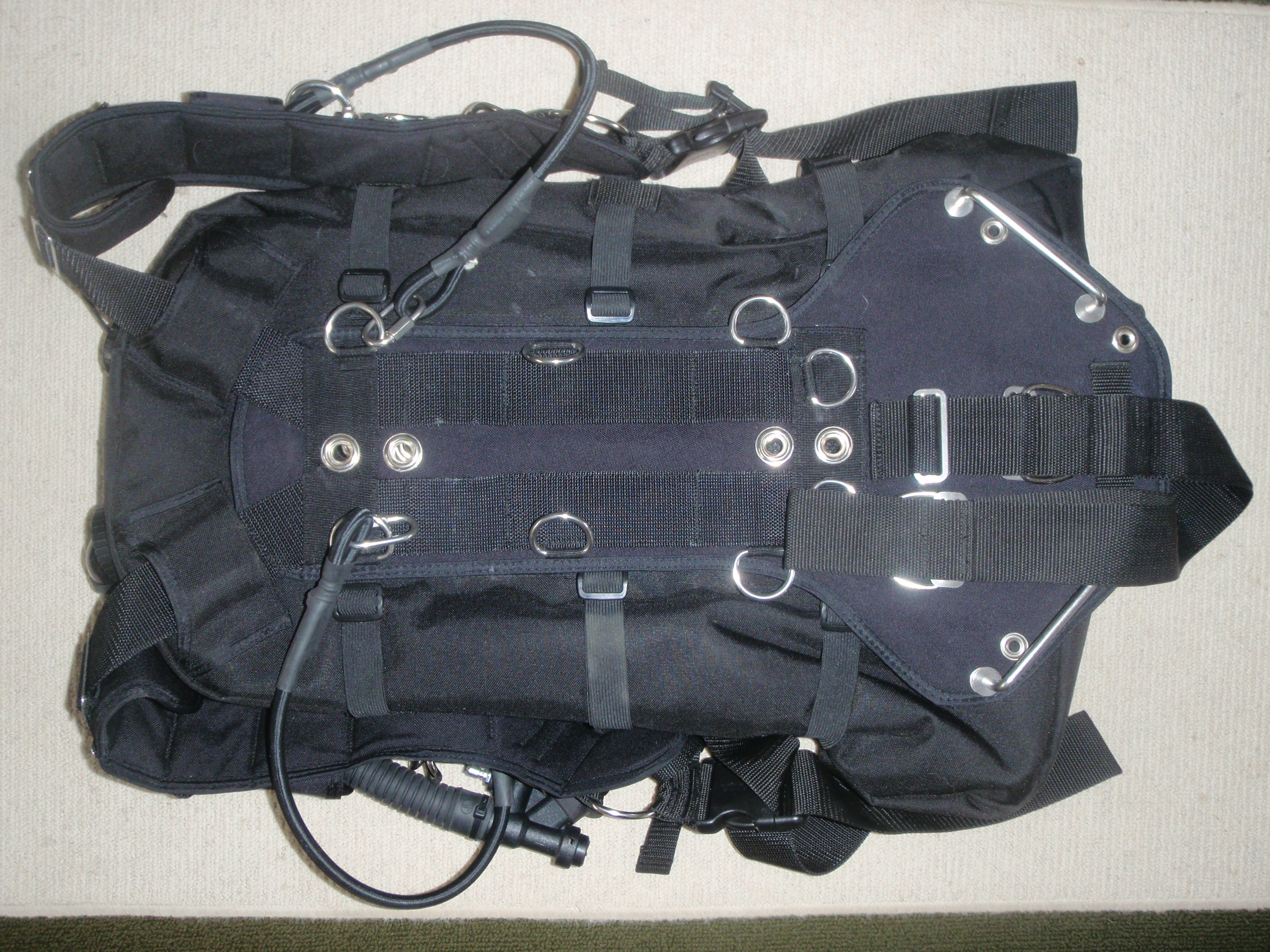
Combination sidemount/backmount harness. Front view

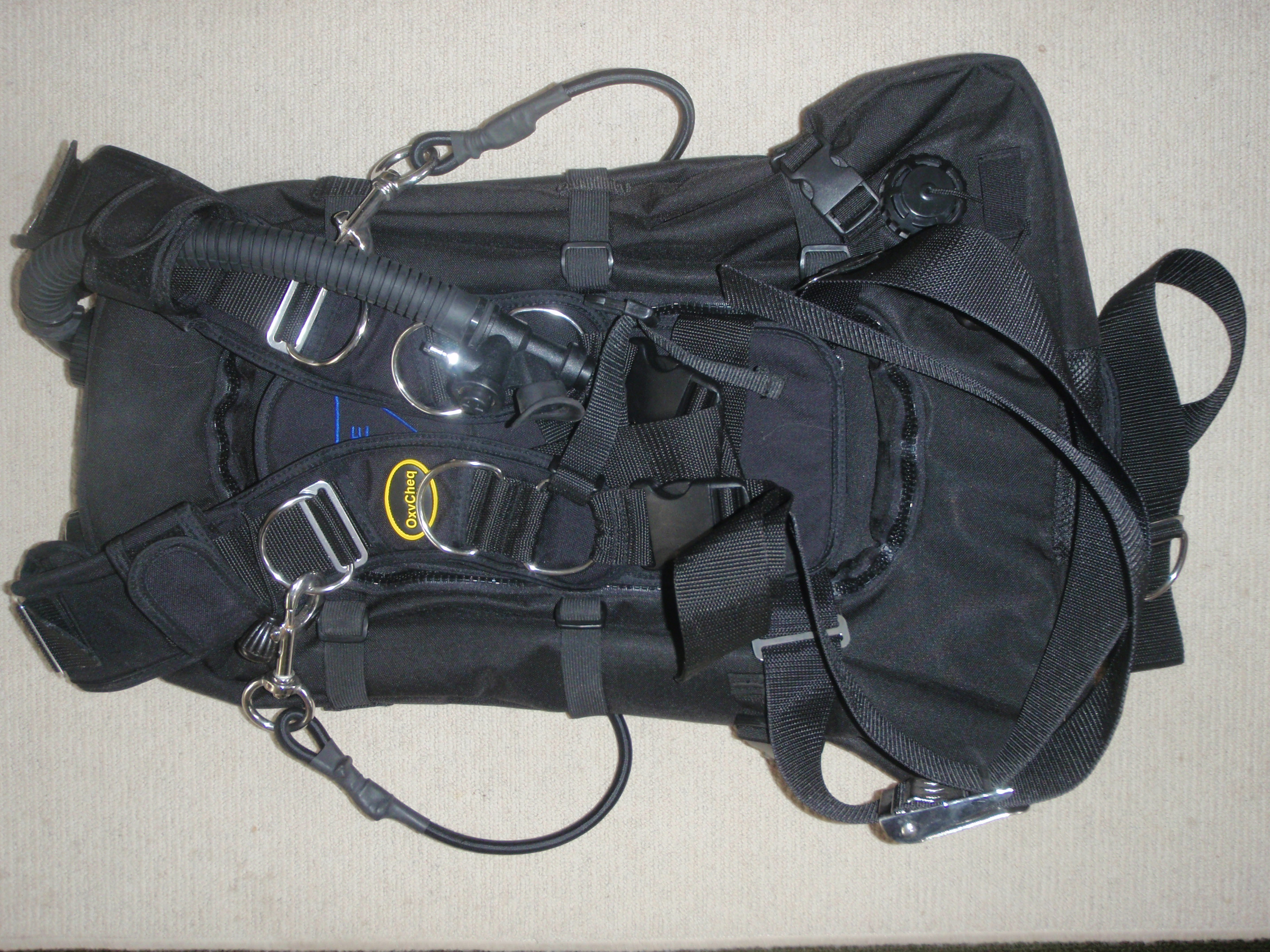
Combination sidemount/backmount harness. Back view

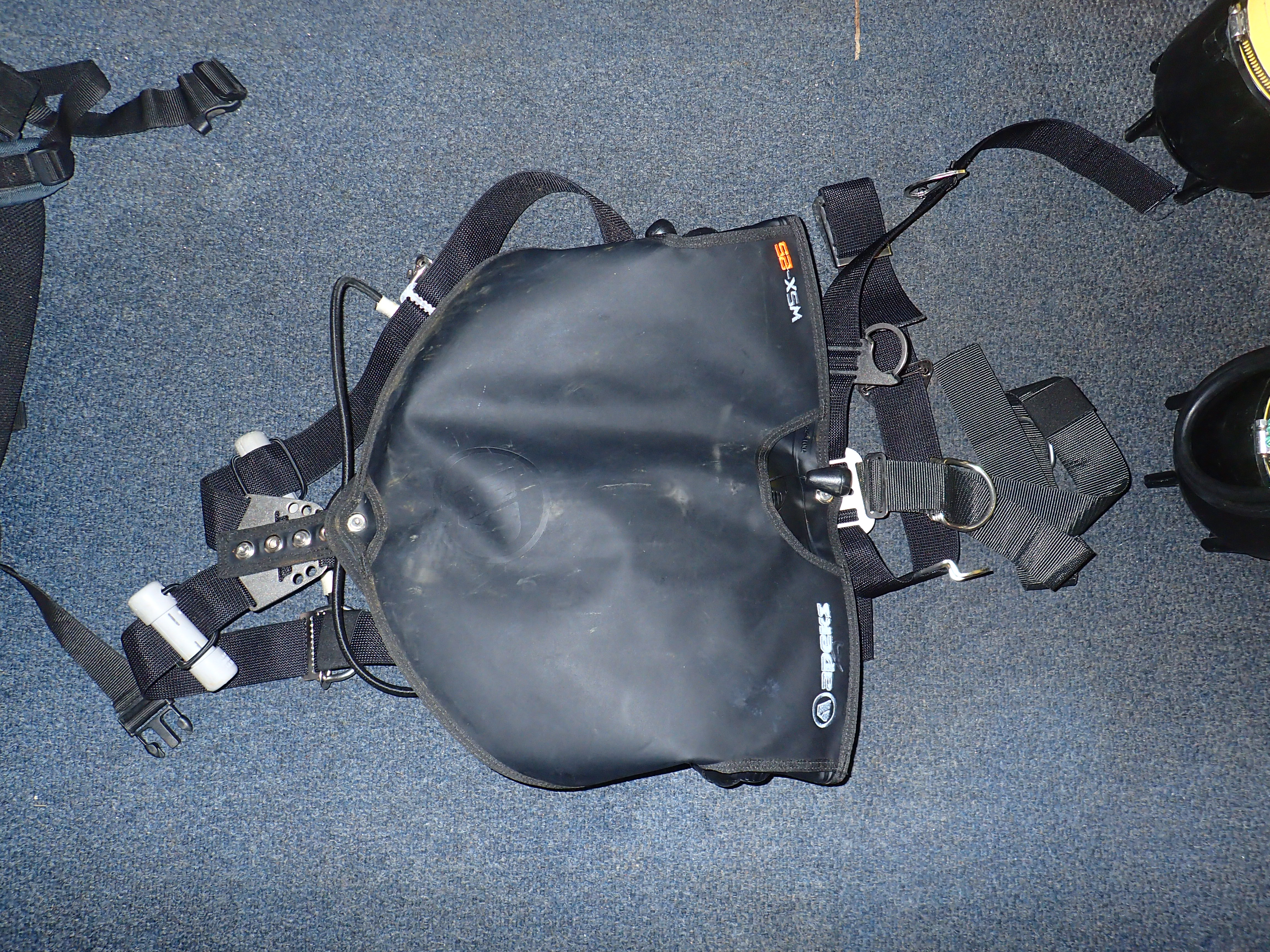
Apeks sidemount harness upper side

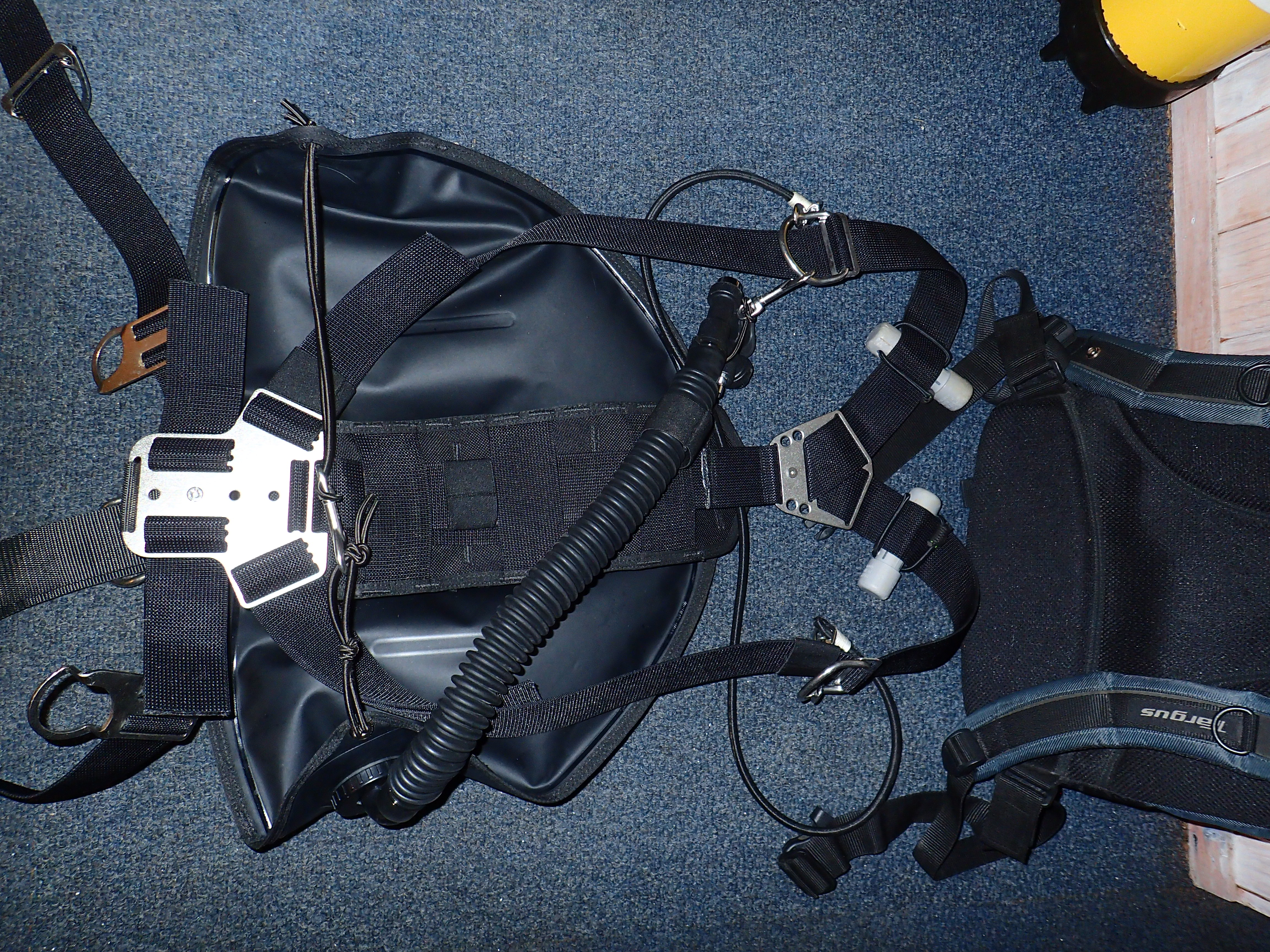
Apeks sidemount harness underside

== Construction ==
Inflatable buoyancy compensators of all types have been made in both single skin and casing and bladder arrangements. The strength and damage resistance of both these systems of construction depend more on the design details and quality of materials and manufacture than on the choice of arrangement, though maintenance may vary, as it is quicker to clean, dry and inspect a single skin than a bladder and casing, and the bladder and casing will have more components for an equivalent layout.

A single skin construction uses the material of the buoyancy bladder as the structural material for the unit, and a casing and bladder structure uses the casing for load bearing purposes and to protect the bladder, which is a replaceable part.

Depending on the construction details, the diver may need to carry up to four pounds of lead (two kilos) to counteract the positive buoyancy of an empty BC.

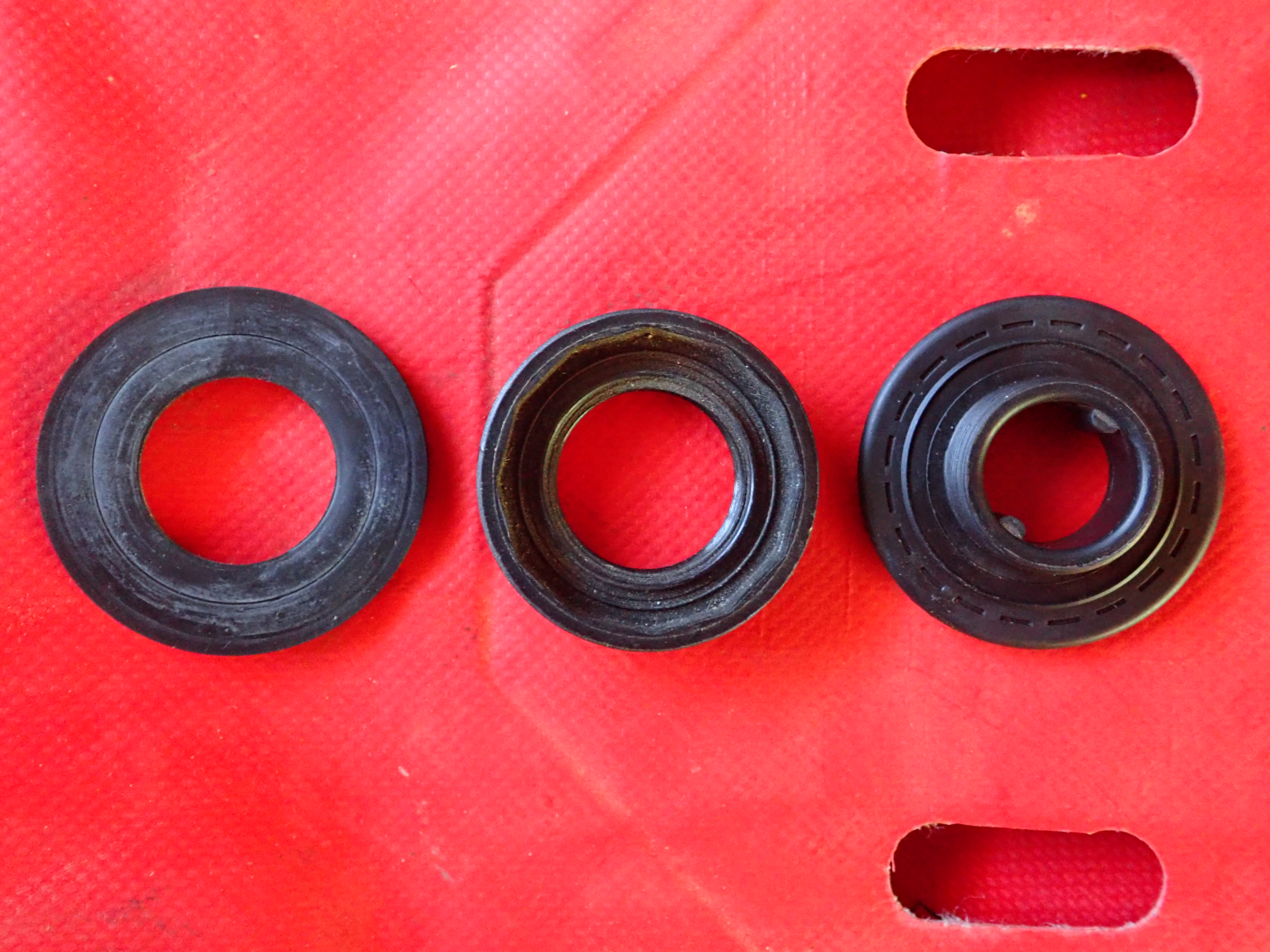
Components of a buoyancy compensator skin fitting

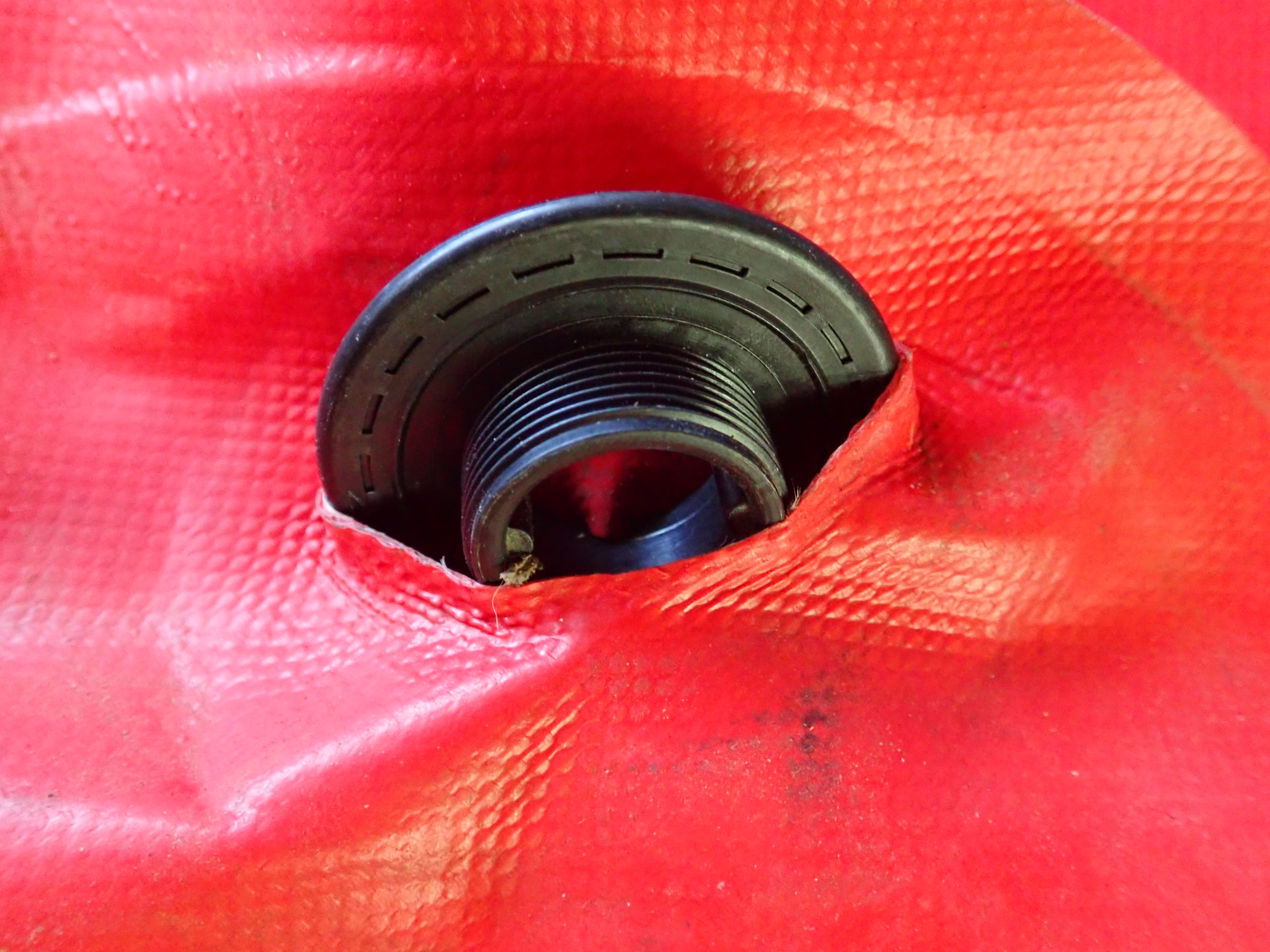
Internal fitting passing through the hole in a buoyancy compensator bladder

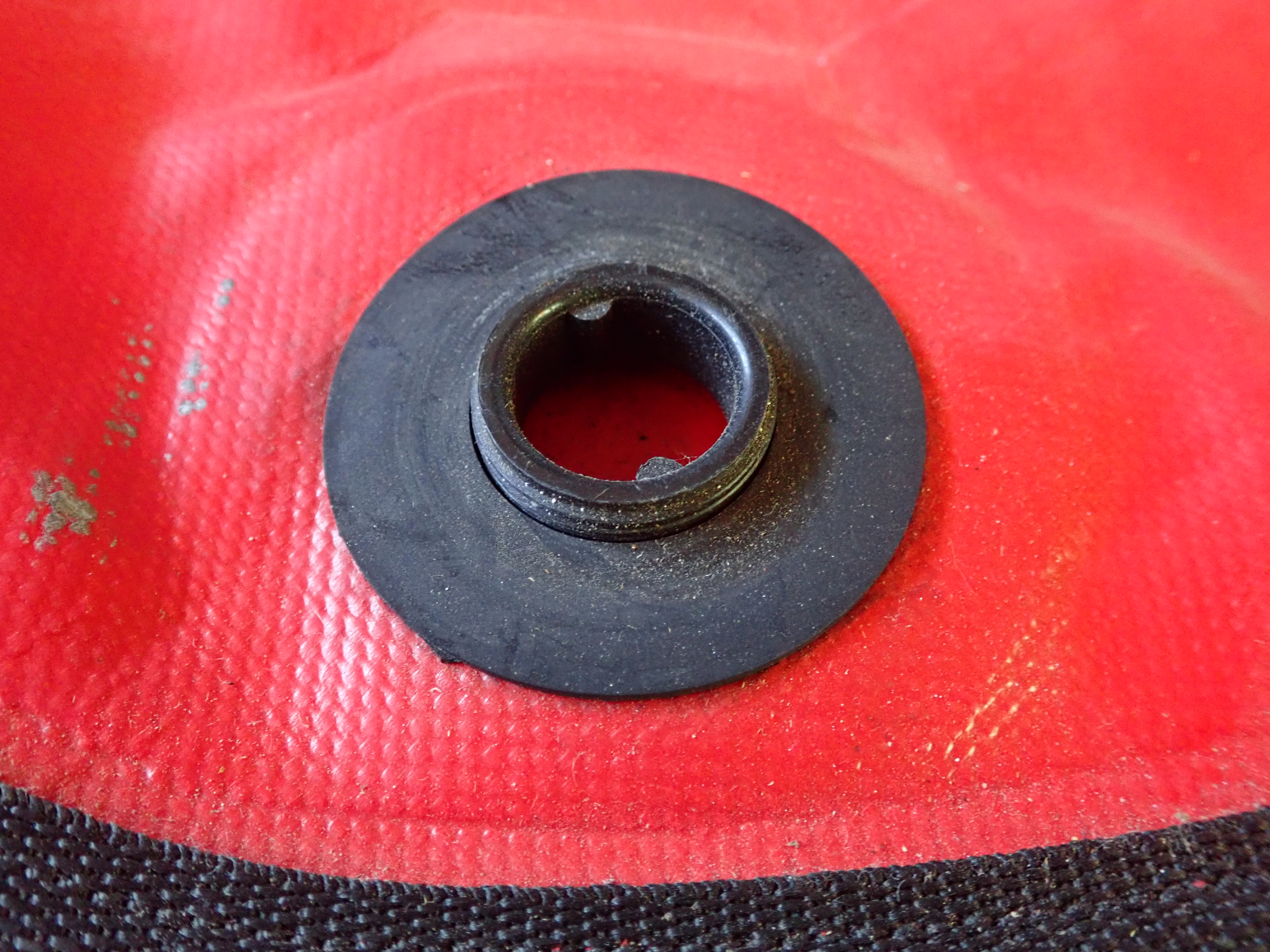
Buoyancy compensator internal fitting and gasket for filling hose or dump valve in place

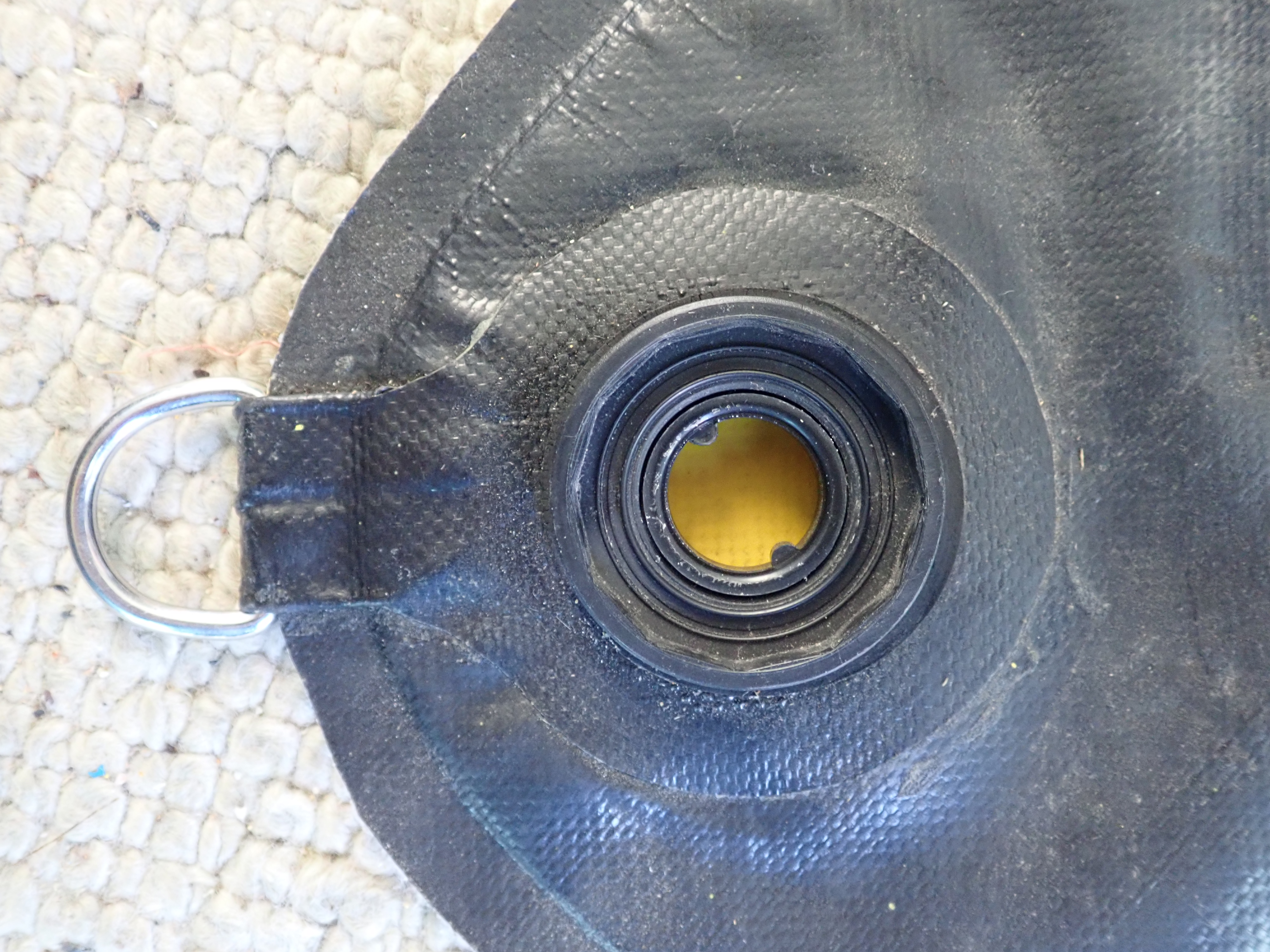
Corner of sidemount buoyancy compensator wing showing skin fitting assembled

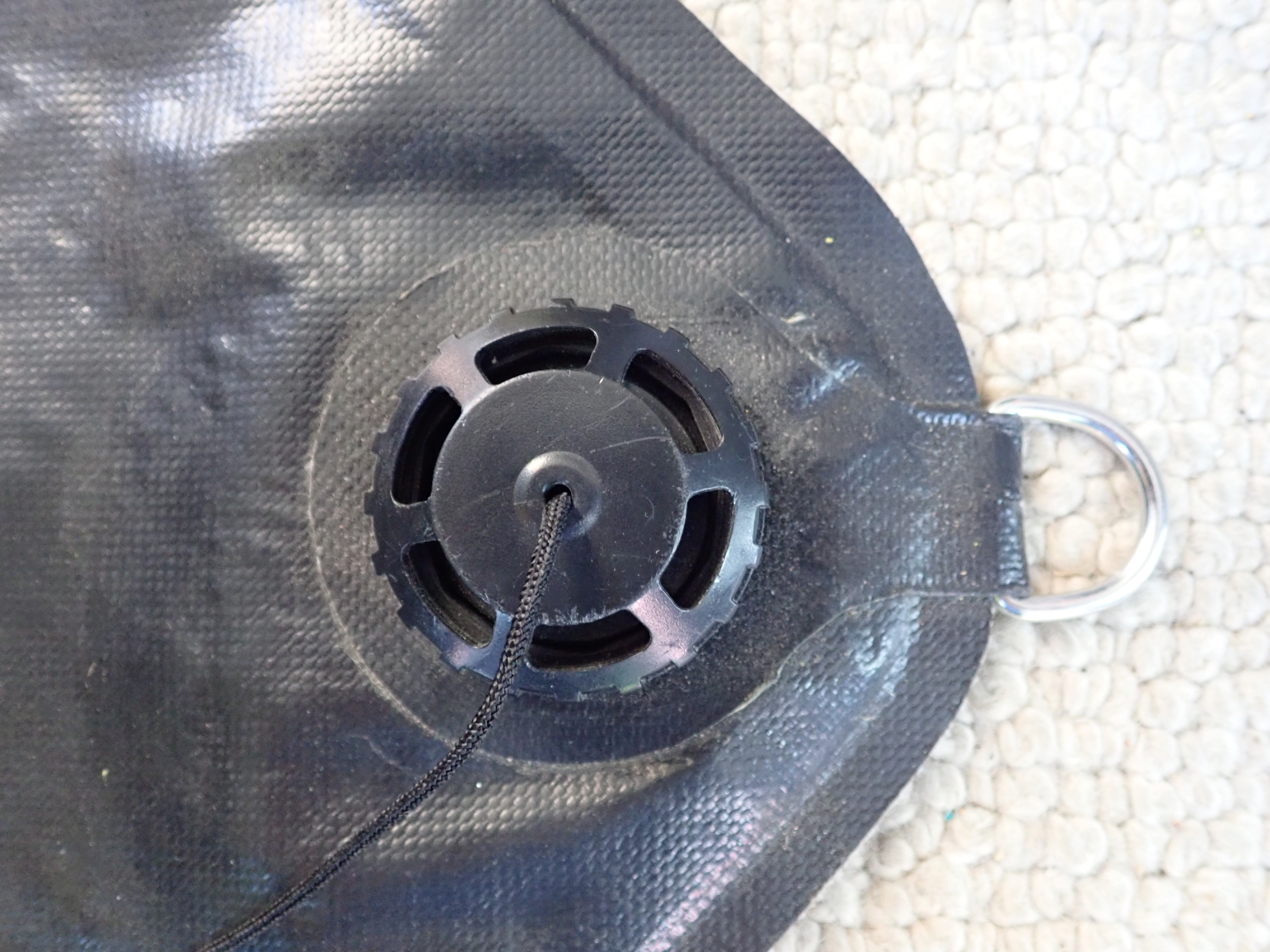
Corner of sidemount buoyancy compensator wing showing dump valve assembled

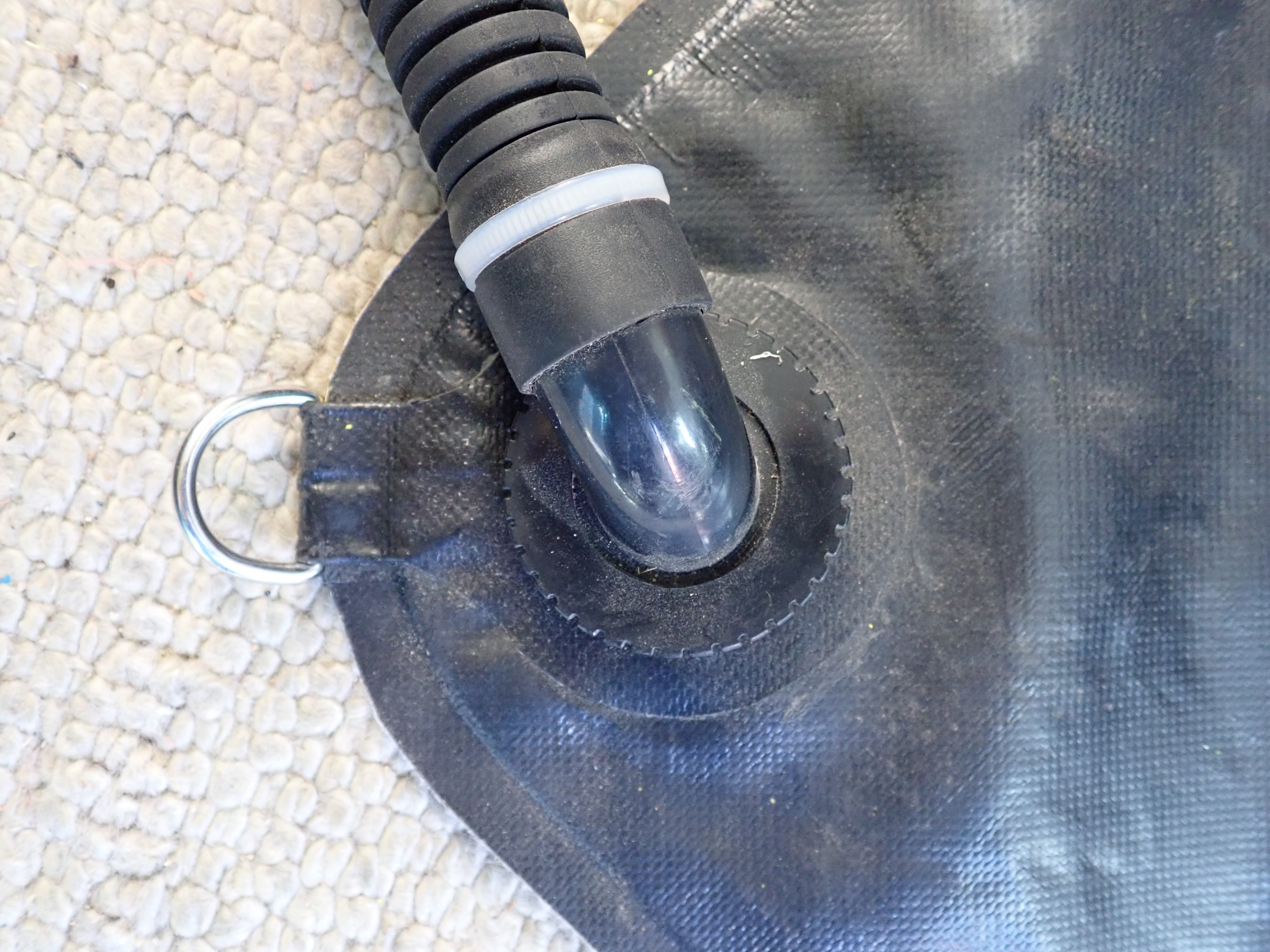
Corner of sidemount buoyancy compensator wing showing inflation hose attachment

=== Components ===
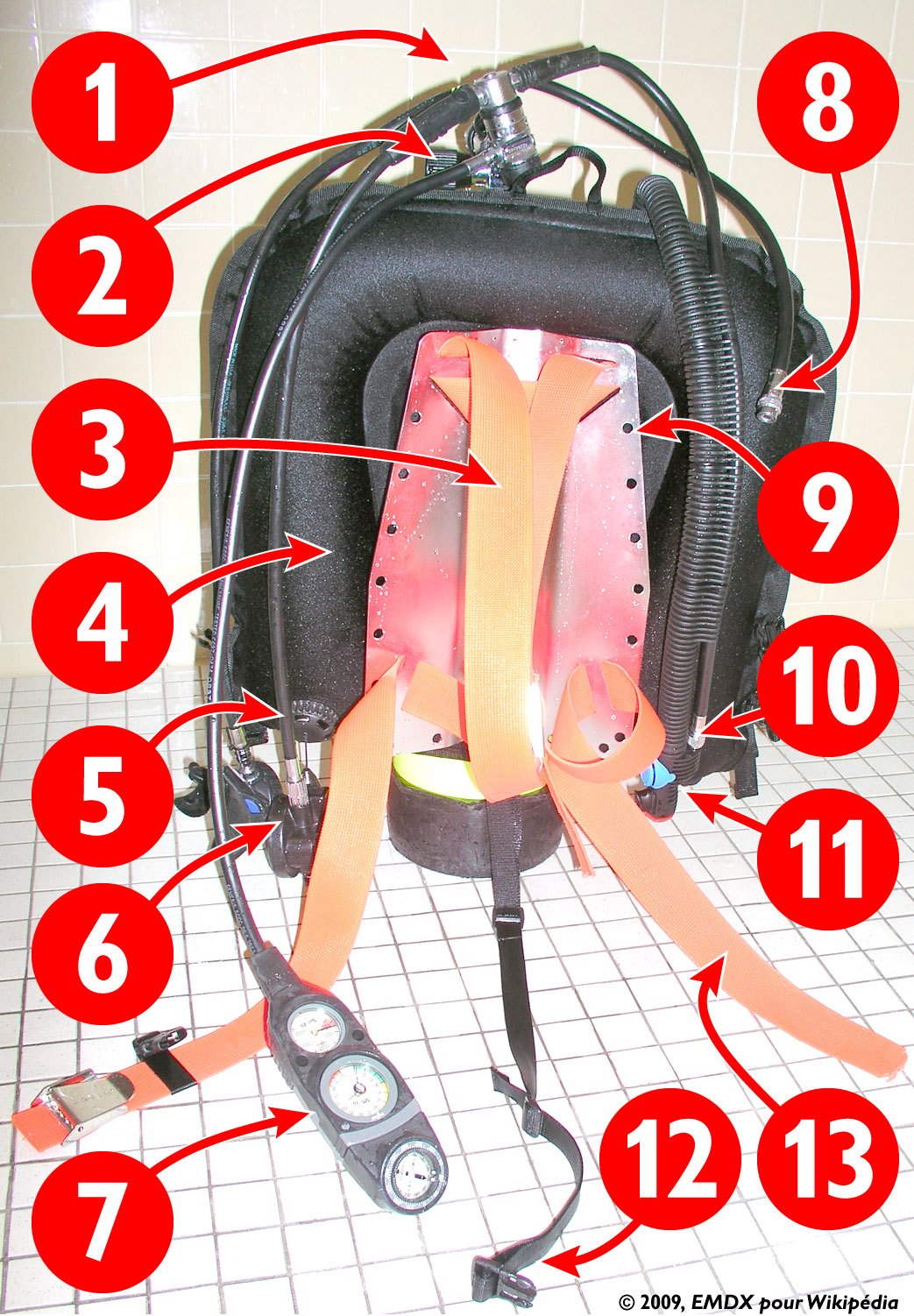
Backplate or wing style B.C.and scuba set: 1. Regulator first stage; 2. Cylinder valve; 3. Shoulder straps; 4. Buoyancy compensator bladder; 5. Relief and bottom manual dump valve; 6. Regulator second stages (with "octopus"); 7. Console (pressure gauge, depth gauge & compass); 8. Dry-suit inflator hose; 9. Backplate; 10. BC inflator hose; 11. Oral inflation mouthpiece and manual dump valve; 12. Crotch strap; 13. Waist strap

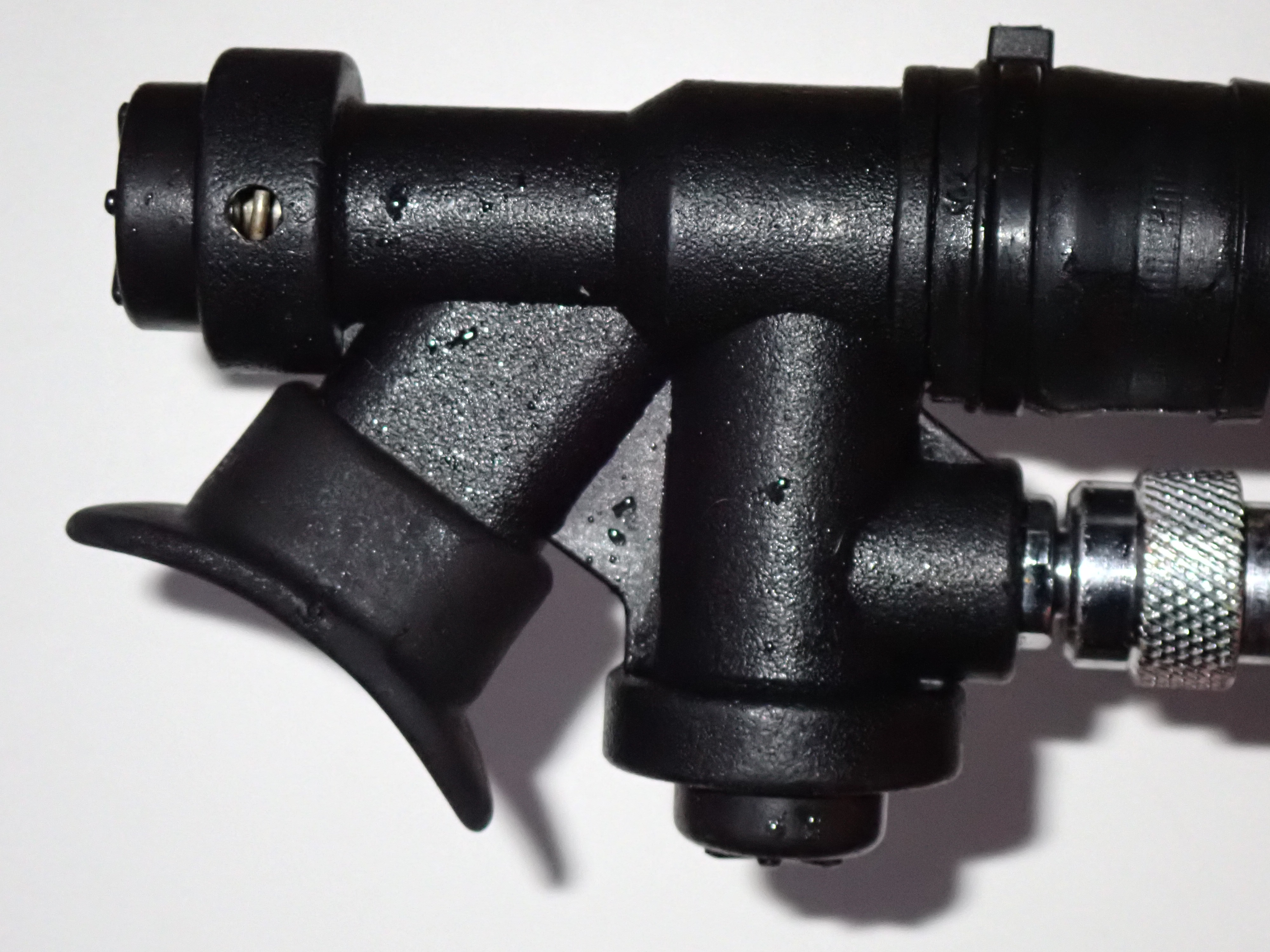
Typical power inflator valve head for buoyancy compensator

All ambient pressure gas bladder type buoyancy compensators will have some components in common:

- A flexible bladder to contain gas which may be added or released during the dive to control buoyancy.
- A means of adding gas to the bladder, generally a low pressure direct feed (Note: European terminology) or power inflator (Note: North American terminology) that injects gas from a low pressure hose from a diving cylinder's first stage regulator to the bladder of the BC, and usually an oral inflation option. Gas flow is controlled by a spring loaded, normally closed, manual operated inflation valve.
- A vent valve or dump valve that allows gas to be released or to escape in a controlled fashion from the bladder(s) of the BC. Most BCs have at least two vents: one at the extreme top and the other at the bottom of the BC, for use as air migrates to whichever part of the BC is uppermost, the vent situated at the shoulder is used when the diver is upright and the vent situated nearer the diver's waist is used when inverted. Venting through the oral inflation system is also usually possible and may be preferred.
- The low pressure and oral inflation valves are usually combined as a unit at the end of a corrugated or ribbed rubber inflation hose, with the low pressure inflation valve button on the side opposite the LP hose connector and the combined exhaust and oral inflation valve at the extreme end of the unit, in line with the corrugated hose. Both buttons are operable simultaneously if held correctly. This arrangement makes it easy for the diver to adapt to an unfamiliar BC, as operation has been largely standardised.
- An over pressure relief valve that automatically vents the bladder if the diver over inflates the BC by ascending or by injecting too much gas. This is usually a secondary function of the vent or dump valve, and is a necessary safety feature to prevent over-pressure damage. It will not release excess gas automatically during a normal ascent. These vent valves are spring loaded and normally closed, but can be manually operated by pulling a short cord
- A means of securing the BC to the diver to transfer buoyancy forces, and to hold the BC in the position intended for its designed function. The BC is typically secured to a diver's torso, either with dedicated straps or as part of a multi-functional system integrated with the bladder or casing.

In addition some BCs may include other features:

- A tough textile casing to contain and protect the bladder, and to which most of the other components are attached, with zippers for access to the bladders;
- Straps (cambands) to secure back-mount cylinders;
- A plastic or metal backplate to support back-mount diving cylinders;
- A crotch strap may be included in the harness to prevent the BC from sliding towards the head when the diver is upright and the bladder is inflated;
- A cummerbund is an alternative approach to reduce the tendency for the BC to slide towards the head by providing a close fit around the waist;
- Pockets for carrying small accessories or tools;
- An integrated diving weighting system – pockets for lead weights with a quick release mechanism. Integrated weights can eliminate the need for a separate weight belt;
- Trim weight pockets for adjusting the position of the diver's centre of gravity to improve diver trim;
- D-rings or other anchor points, for clipping on other equipment such as dive lights, pressure gauge, reels, cameras and stage, bailout, or side-mount cylinders;
- Emergency inflation cylinders. This can either be a small (about 0.5 litre) air cylinder, filled from the diver's main cylinder, or a small carbon dioxide cylinder;
- Reflective tape for better visibility;
- Padding for comfort;
- A redundant bladder with associated filling and venting components, as a backup in case of failure of the primary bladder;
- Alternative breathing gas regulator connected to or integrated with the inflation/deflation valve assembly;
- Bungees to restrain a partially inflated wing.

=== Size and fit ===
The buoyancy compensator must fit the diver comfortably and must stay securely in place without constraining the diver's freedom of movement. There is some conflict between allowing easy adjustment to fit a range of diver builds, and setting up the harness to optimum fit for a specific diver in a specific diving suit. This is a particular problem with jacket style BCs which are inherently less adjustable for fit than backplate harnesses, which are more adjustable, but may take more time to adjust.

It is critically important that the fully inflated buoyancy compensator can support the diver with the maximum equipment load on the surface at the start of a dive, and with maximum suit compression at the maximum depth before much gas is used up. There have been fatalities due to overloading the BC. On the other hand, buoyancy control is easiest with the lowest practicable volume of gas in the BC and dry suit, as these volumes change with depth changes, and must be adjusted to remain neutral.

Measurements of volume change of neoprene foam used for wetsuits under hydrostatic compression shows that about 30% of the volume, and therefore 30% of surface buoyancy, is lost in about the first 10 m, another 30% by about 60 m, and the volume appears to stabilise at about 65% loss by about 100 m. The total buoyancy loss of a wetsuit is proportional to the initial uncompressed volume. An average person has a surface area of about 2 m^{2}, so the uncompressed volume of a full one piece 6 mm thick wetsuit will be in the order of 1.75 × 0.006 = 0.0105 m^{3}, or roughly 10 litres. The mass will depend on the specific formulation of the foam, but will probably be in the order of 4 kg, for a net buoyancy of about 6 kg at the surface. Depending on the overall buoyancy of the diver, this will generally require about 6 kg of additional weight to bring the diver to neutral buoyancy to allow reasonably easy descent The volume lost at 10 m is about 3 litres, or 3 kg of buoyancy, rising to about 6 kg buoyancy lost at about 60 m. This could nearly double for a large person wearing a farmer-john and jacket for cold water. This loss of buoyancy must be balanced by inflating the buoyancy compensator to maintain neutral buoyancy at depth.

It must be possible to remain neutrally buoyant at the end of the dive, at the shallowest decompression stop, when almost all the diver's breathing gas has been used up. It is not sufficient to only be able to remain neutral with reserve gas, as if the reserve gas is nearly used up due to a problem, the diver will not want to be struggling or unable to stay down to decompress.

Weighting must be sufficient to allow the diver to stay at the shallowest stop with almost empty cylinders, and available buoyancy volume must allow the BC to support the full cylinders. The absolute minimum acceptable volume for the BC is enough to support the total mass of breathing gas in all the cylinders the diver will carry, plus lost volume due to suit compression at depth. This will be enough only if the diver carries no excess weight. It is easier to allow for a slight weight excess and use a slightly larger volume BC, but if taken to excess this will make buoyancy control more difficult and labour-intensive, and will use more gas, particularly during ascent when it is most critical. A BC designed for recreational diving or for a small person may not have sufficient volume for technical diving.

An unnecessarily large volume BC constitutes a greater risk of loss of control of ascent rate, particularly when combined with carrying more weight than is necessary to allow neutral buoyancy at the end of the dive with empty cylinders. On the other hand, a large volume gives greater comfort and security when floating at the surface before and after a dive.

== Operation ==
The inflatable buoyancy compensator is operated by adjusting the volume of gas contained in the bladder, using an inflation valve to inject gas and one or more deflation valves, or dump valves to release gas. The gas is usually supplied from a low pressure port of the diving regulator on a breathing gas cylinder, or orally, as exhaled gas, though dedicated gas cylinders can be used. At the surface, the bladder is inflated to provide positive buoyancy, allowing the diver to float in a preferred orientation, or deflated to let the diver start to sink to initiate a dive. During the dive, gas is added or released using the same valves, as required to provide the desired buoyancy.

=== Buoyancy control ===
The diver needs to be able to establish three states of buoyancy at different stages of a dive:

1. negative buoyancy: when the diver wants to descend or stay on the seabed. Recreational divers seldom need much buoyancy deficit, but commercial divers may need to be heavy to facilitate some kinds of work. A feet first descent may make ear equalisation easier for some divers, and this is difficult unless buoyancy is slightly negative.
2. neutral buoyancy: when the diver wants to remain at constant depth, with minimal effort, and no other support. This is the desired state for most of a recreational dive, and allows trim which minimises environmental impact. This state is also optimal for a number of professional diving activities.
3. positive buoyancy: when the diver wants to float at the surface or ascend under some emergency circumstances.

To achieve negative buoyancy, divers who carry or wear buoyant equipment must be weighted to counteract the buoyancy of both the diver and the equipment.

When underwater, a diver often needs to be neutrally buoyant and neither sink nor rise. A state of neutral buoyancy exists when the weight of water that the diver and equipment displaces equals the total weight of the diver and equipment. The diver uses a BC to maintain this state of neutral buoyancy by adjusting the volume of gas in the BC and therefore its buoyancy, in response to various effects, which alter the diver's overall volume or weight, primarily:

- If the diver's exposure suit is made of a compressible gas-filled material such as foamed neoprene, the volume of the gas bubbles in the material will change (following Boyle's law) as the pressure changes when the diver descends and ascends. The volume of gas in the BC is adjusted to compensate for this.
- Gas contained in the flexible air spaces within the diver's body and equipment (including gas in the BC) is compressed on descent and expands on ascent. The diver normally counteracts this by adding gas to the space or drysuit, in order to avoid "squeeze", or releasing the excess. Gas content in the BC is adjusted to correct buoyancy if these other corrections are not enough.
- As the dive proceeds, gas is consumed from the scuba cylinders carried by the diver. This represents a progressive loss of mass which makes the diver more buoyant, and the diver's overall buoyancy must be reduced by venting air from the BC. For this reason the diver needs to configure their equipment to be a little overweight at the beginning of the dive, so that neutral buoyancy can be achieved after the loss of the weight of all the breathing gas carried. Air or nitrox weighs about 1.3 grams per litre at standard pressure. Thus, the magnitude of weight change from use of breathing gas during a recreational dive usually varies from roughly 1.8 kilograms (4.0 lb) for a 10-litre 200 bar cylinder breathed down to 50 bar, to roughly 3.5 kilograms (7.7 lb) for a steel 15 litre cylinder 230 bars (3,300 psi) breathed down to 50 bar, or about 5 lbs difference for the common 80 ft^{3} aluminium (AL80) cylinder (11.1 litres internal capacity) pressurised to 3000 psi, breathed down to 500psi, though in technical diving using multiple cylinders the mass loss can be considerably more, and in an emergency the reserve gas may also be used.

In practice, the diver doesn't think about all this theory during the dive. To remain neutrally buoyant, gas is added to the BC when the diver is negative (too heavy), or vented from the BC when the diver is too buoyant (too light). There is no stable equilibrium position for a diver with any compressible gas space. Any change in depth from a position of neutral buoyancy and even small changes in volume, including the act of breathing, result in a force toward an even less neutral depth. Thus, maintenance of neutral buoyancy in scuba is a continuous and active procedure—the diving equivalent of balance, in a positive feedback environment. Fortunately, the diver's mass provides a source of inertia, as does the liquid medium, so small perturbations (such as from breathing) can be compensated for easily by an experienced diver.

There is a depth range in open circuit diving in which effectively stable neutral buoyancy can be maintained by adjusting the lung volume during the breathing cycle. This depth range depends on the volume of ambient pressure gas spaces in and connected to the diver, and the ambient pressure, representing the depth, of the neutrally buoyant diver, with a lung at half tidal volume at the reference depth. The volume changes of external ambient pressure gas spaces are the perturbing influence, and the variation of lung volume achievable by the diver is the restoring influence. This pseudo-stable range of depths is greater at greater depths since a larger depth change is needed to change pressure, and thereby volume, by the same proportion. Similarly, the range is greater for a smaller total volume of non-respiratory ambient pressure gas space, as the variation in buoyancy is also proportional to this quantity, while the lung capacity of the diver is almost constant.

A feature of diving which is often non-intuitive for beginners, is that gas generally needs to be added to the BC when a diver descends in a controlled manner, and vented (removed or dumped) from the BC when the diver ascends in a controlled manner. This gas (added or vented) maintains the volume of the gas in the BC during depth changes; this bubble needs to remain at approximately constant volume for the diver to remain even approximately neutrally buoyant. When gas is not added to the BC during a descent, the gas in the BC decreases in volume due to the increasing pressure, resulting in a decrease in buoyancy and faster descent with greater depth, until the diver hits the bottom. The same runaway phenomenon, an example of positive feedback, can happen during ascent, resulting in uncontrolled ascent, until a diver prematurely surfaces without a safety (decompression) stop. This effect is greatest near the surface where volume change is greatest in proportion to depth change.

With practice, divers learn to minimise this problem, starting by minimizing the volume of gas required in their BCs. This is done by using the minimum weighting needed for their equipment, which keeps the volume of the gas in the BC as small as possible at the beginning of a dive. Just enough gas will be vented from the BC to compensate for the slow loss of weight as the dive progresses, as a result of gas use, which will vary according to the dive, but is limited by the cylinder contents. (in practice, for a recreational diver, this will be about 2 to 4.5 kilograms (4.4 to 9.9 lb) per cylinder). The need to compensate for excessive ballast weight by a larger volume of gas in the BC bladder considerably reduces the depth range in which breath volume adjustment can compensate for changes in BC gas volume.

Somewhat complex trained reflex behaviors may be developed by experienced divers, involving breathing control and BC gas management during depth changes, which allow them to remain neutrally buoyant from minute to minute during a dive, without having to think much about it. Skilled scuba divers may be identified by their ability to maintain constant depth in horizontal trim, without fin use. Ease and accuracy of buoyancy control is affected by awareness of changes of depth. Precision control is relatively easy while there is a clear visual reference, but more difficult when the only reference is instrumentation. The most difficult circumstances for most scuba divers are during ascent in low visibility in mid-water without an ascent line, a time when depth control is most important for decompression safety.

=== Orientation in the water ===
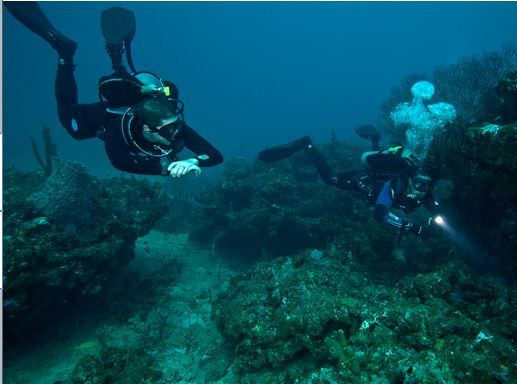
Divers with neutral buoyancy and horizontal trim with the fins raised are less likely to touch or disturb the bottom

The vertical-horizontal orientation, or trim, of the submerged diver is influenced by the BC and by other buoyancy and weight components and contributed to by the diver's body, clothing and equipment. The scuba diver typically wishes to be trimmed nearly horizontally (prone) while under water, to be able to see and swim efficiently, but more nearly vertical and perhaps partly supine, to be able to breathe without a regulator when on the surface. Buoyancy and trim can significantly affect hydrodynamic drag on a diver and the effort required to swim. The effect of swimming with a head up angle, of about 15° as is quite common in poorly trimmed divers, can be an increase in drag in the order of 50%, which will adversely affect gas consumption.

The static and stable orientation of an object floating in water, such as a diver, is determined by its centre of buoyancy and its centre of mass. At stable equilibrium, they will be lined up by gravity and buoyancy with the centre of buoyancy vertically above the centre of mass. The diver's overall buoyancy and centre of buoyancy can routinely be adjusted by altering the volume of the gas in the BC, lungs and diving suit. The diver's mass on a typical dive does not generally change by what seems like much (see above—a typical dive-resort "aluminum 80" tank at 207 bars (3,000 psi) contains about 2.8 kilograms (6.2 lb) of air or nitrox, of which about 2.3 kilograms (5.1 lb) is typically used in a dive, although any air spaces such as in the BC and in diving suits will expand and shrink with depth pressure. Larger changes in buoyancy are possible if the diving weights are jettisoned, or a heavy object is picked up.

Generally, the diver has a little control over the position of the centre of buoyancy in the BC during a dive, the air in an incompletely inflated buoyancy compensator will rise to the shallowest part of the bladder unless prevented by a restriction to the flow. The position of this shallow point will depend on the diver trim and the geometry of the bladder. If the diver changes orientation in the water the gas will flow to the new high part if it does not have to flow down first to get there. As a result of this movement of gas, some buoyancy compensators will tend to hold the diver in the new position until actively changed. This is more likely in back mounted wing type bladders, where the gas can flow laterally to the high side and stay there. The diver can change the centre of gravity by adjustment of the equipment setup, which includes its configuration and position of weights, which ultimately influence where the effective BC lift is positioned relative to the centre of gravity.

Traditionally, weight belts or weight systems are worn with the weights on, or close to, the waist and are arranged with a quick release mechanism to allow them to be quickly jettisoned to provide extra buoyancy in an emergency. Weight carried on a belt can be distributed to shift the weight forward or backward to change the position of the diver's centre of mass. Systems that integrate the weights into the BC, can provide improved comfort so long as the BC does not have to be removed from the body of the diver, for example in an underwater emergency such as an entanglement. When a weight integrated BC is removed, a diver wearing no weight-belt, and any type of wetsuit or dry suit, will be very buoyant.

By inflating the BC at the surface, a conscious diver may be able to easily float face-up, depending on their equipment configuration choices. A fatigued or unconscious diver can be made to float face up at the surface by adjustment of their buoyancy and weights, so the buoyancy raises the top and front of the diver's body, and the weights act at the lower back of the body. An inflated horse-collar BC always provides this orientation, but an inflated vest or wing may float the diver face-down if the centre of buoyancy is behind the centre of gravity. This floating orientation is generally considered undesirable and can be minimised by relocation of some of the weights further to the rear, and using higher density cylinders (typically steel), which also move the centre of mass towards the back of the diver. The BC type can also be selected with this factor in mind, selecting a style with a centre of buoyancy further forward when filled, as this has the same net effect. Any or all of these options can be utilised to trim the system out to its desired characteristics and many factors can contribute, such as the number and position of diving cylinders, the type of diving suit, the position, size, and buoyancy distribution of stage cylinders, the size and shape of the diver's body and the wearing of ankle weights, or additional dive equipment. Each of these influence a diver's preferred orientation under the water (horizontal) and at the surface (vertical to supine) to some degree.

=== Inflation gas supply and consumption ===
The usual inflation system is through a low-pressure hose from the primary breathing gas supply, but a dedicated direct feed pony bottle was common on early buoyancy compensators, and remains an option for some models. Most BCs allow oral inflation both underwater and on the surface. This could theoretically reduce gas consumption, but is generally not considered worth the effort and the slight additional hazard of taking the DV out of the mouth underwater, and possibly having to purge it before breathing again. Oral inflation is, however, an effective alternative inflation method in case of a failure of the pressurised inflation system. Emergency inflation by expendable CO_{2} cartridge is provided on some older BCs.

Gas consumption varies depending on the dive profile and diver skill. The minimum consumption is by a diver who uses the correct amount to neutralise buoyancy and does not waste gas by overfilling, or by excessive weighting. The actual volume of the bladder should not affect gas consumption by a skilled user, as only enough gas to achieve neutral buoyancy is needed. Deep dives will require more gas, and dives in which the diver ascends and descends by large amounts and/or frequently, will require venting for each ascent and inflation for each descent. The amount of gas used during the dive during US Navy trials was generally below 6% of the total gas consumption, and the use of small dedicated cylinders for inflation was considered adequate, but not necessary. For deep technical diving it is considered prudent to supply the BC from a different regulator or cylinder to dry suit inflation gas, as this reduces the risk of simultaneous failure of both buoyancy control options by an order of magnitude.

When used with a full-face mask or helmet, or with a rebreather, oral inflation becomes impracticable or impossible, and the reliability of the inflation system becomes safety-critical. Divers wearing dry suits have an alternative gas source available if the quick-connector systems for suit and BC are compatible and the gas supplies independent. The dry suit can also usually be used for additional buoyancy in an emergency. The use of compatible quick connectors for both the dry suit and buoyancy compensator is also a way of reducing the risk of both items becoming unavailable during a dive, providing the diver has the dexterity and strength to disconnect and reconnect the fittings underwater.

== Hazards and malfunctions ==
Although a correctly fitted and competently operated buoyancy compensator is one of the most important items of equipment for diver safety, convenience, and comfort, particularly for scuba divers, it is also a significant hazard if used wrongly or in case of some kinds of malfunction:

- There is a risk that an emergency inflation cylinder can be accidentally opened during a dive causing a rapid ascent and barotrauma to the diver. Carbon dioxide, being poisonous at high partial pressures, is a dangerous gas to have in a BC if the diver may inhale it from the bag underwater. The risk of this happening is fairly low, as the diver may be aware that the emergency inflation has been operated, and divers are no longer trained to use the BC gas as an alternative breathing gas supply. Most BCs do not have a CO_{2} inflation option, which eliminates this hazard.
- Redundant bladders may be inadvertently filled, either by unintended action of the diver, or by malfunction of the filling mechanism, and if the failure is not recognised and dealt with promptly, this may result in a runaway uncontrolled ascent, with associated risk of decompression illness. There is a risk that the diver will not recognise which bladder is full and attempt to dump from the wrong one. The risk can be reduced by ensuring that the filling mechanisms are clearly distinguishable by both feel and position, and not connecting a low pressure supply hose to the reserve until needed, so it is impossible to add gas by accident. Another strategy for avoiding the problem of confusion between bladders in use is to strap the inflator valves together and assume that both are always in use. For this to work reasonably reliably the dump valves must also always be operated together.
- Catastrophic bladder failure due to puncture, tearing, or failure of the dump valve or inflation assembly can leave the diver with inadequate buoyancy to make a safe ascent, particularly if diving deep with large gas supply and insufficient ditchable weight. The risk can be mitigated by diving in a dry suit, which can be inflated to add buoyancy in an emergency, by carrying a DSMB, which can be deployed to provide a surface float, and by using distributed ditchable weights – ditching the whole weightbelt or too much weight may result in the opposite problem of excessive buoyancy and the inability to maintain neutral buoyancy at decompression stops.
- Inflator valve malfunction can inflate the bladder when the buoyancy is not needed, and if not recognised and dealt with promptly, can result in uncontrolled ascent with associated risk of decompression illness. This can happen more quickly with inflators combined with alternative demand valves as they must use a larger bore hose connector to be capable of supplying sufficient breathing gas at depth to a stressed diver. However, the standard overpressure and dump valves provided are able to vent air faster than the inflator valve can fill the bladder. This can be mitigated by the ability to disconnect the inflator hose under pressure, a skill which is trained by some agencies.
- Ineffective or poorly adjusted cambands may let the cylinder slip and it may fall off the harness. Twin cambands provide redundancy against a camband being inadvertently released.
- Excessive gas volume, to compensate for over-weighting or carrying heavy equipment, may increase in volume during ascent faster than the diver can vent and result in a runaway ascent, particularly with large volume BCs. This is avoided by using a bladder volume which matches the buoyancy requirements, and avoiding over-weighting.
- Some designs of BC combined with poor weight and buoyancy distribution may support an unconscious diver face down at the surface.
- In some cases an excessively large jacket BC can cause an unconscious diver to be supported face down at the surface.
- A loose-fitting BC without a crotch strap may slide up the diver and fail to keep their head out of the water at the surface, particularly in combination with a weight belt weighting system.
- A tight cummerbund may restrict the ability of the diver to breathe freely. As the work of breathing increases with depth this may result in ineffective ventilation leading to carbon dioxide buildup, toxicity, a desperate urge to breathe, hyperventilation, and eventually panic. Panic underwater has been associated with many fatalities. A crotch strap eliminates the need for a cummerbund, but a cummerbund is more easily adjusted to fit the diver, and is popular for rental equipment.
- Insufficient buoyancy to achieve neutral buoyancy at maximum depth of a dive due to mismatch of BC volume with weighting and wetsuit compression. This can be caused by excessive weighting or by an undersized BC. A larger volume is needed with large or multiple cylinders to compensate for the greater mass of gas which may be used during the dive.

If the diver runs out of gas while negatively buoyant, not only will they lack breathing gas for the ascent, but will also have to swim harder to ascend at a time of great stress, and it may be necessary to ditch ballast weights.

== History ==
In 1957, F. G. Jensen and Willard F. Searle Jr began testing methods for manual and automatic buoyancy compensation for the United States Navy Experimental Diving Unit (NEDU). In their early tests, they determined that manual systems were more desirable due to the size of the automatic systems. Later that year, the Walter Kidde and Co. sent a prototype buoyancy compensating tank for use with two cylinders to NEDU for evaluation. The valves of this aluminium tank system leaked and testing was delayed until 1959 when it was recommended for field testing.

The ABLJ was developed by Maurice Fenzy in 1961. Early versions were inflated by mouth underwater. Later versions had their own air inflation cylinder. Some had carbon dioxide inflation cartridges (a holdover, for surface use, of the Mae West flyer's lifejacket) to facilitate emergency ascent. This was abandoned when valves that allowed divers to breathe from the BC's inflation bag were introduced. The Fenzy ABLJ provided a proof of concept for buoyancy compensation, however the large-volume ring behind the diver's neck caused the jacket to ride up against the diver's throat, despite the crotch strap.

In 1968, dive shop owners Joe Schuch and Jack Schammel developed a more comfortable buoyancy compensator vest that featured a smaller buoyancy ring behind the diver's head, and a midriff section with sufficient volume to lift the diver's head out of the water in the event that one or both of its CO_{2} cartridges were activated for emergency ascent. In 1969, the original Control Buoyancy Jacket or "CBJ" was manufactured by Waverly Air Products of Chemung, NY and sold in dive shops throughout the east coast of the United States. By 1970, a push-button inflator using air from the diver's SCUBA tank augmented the manual inflation hose.

Since 1970 most BCs have mainly used gas from one of the diver's main cylinders for inflation, and oral inflation valves have been generally retained for contingency use when there is no high pressure gas left, or a malfunction of an inflator hose occurs, both underwater and at the surface.

Scubapro introduced the stabilizer jacket in 1971, with a patented "360° flow through design", which allowed air to flow over the shoulders and under the arms, and around the cylinder mount. Later products from competitors avoided patent infringement by eliminating some of the air path options, such as separating the bladder under the arms or over the shoulders. These modifications also simplified the structure of the bladder. One of these later models was the Seatec Manta, with shoulder buckles and a softpac structure (without a rigid backpack)

In 1972, Watergill developed the At Pac wing, the first wing-style BC, which was provided with a cummerbund and padded shoulder straps, and an integrated weight system.

In 1985 Seaquest, Inc. introduced the Advanced Design Vest (ADV), a design featuring an under-arm wrap, shoulder buckles and a cummerbund. This design was duplicated by other manufacturers and continues to be produced as of 2013

Rigid shell back inflation buoyancy compensators were marketed by U.S. Divers (UDS-I system) and Dacor (CV Nautilus) for a short period in the mid 70s. The Nautilus had an automatic inflation system using a regulator to maintain a constant volume, but the changes in buoyancy due to wetsuit compression and gas usage were not well compensated and the system never caught on.

More recent innovations for jacket BCs include weight pouches to adjust trim, carrying the weights on the BC rather than on a weightbelt, integrated regulators, heavily reinforced 1050 denier ballistic nylon. Innovations for backplate and wing include redundant bladders, stainless steel backplates, lightweight soft nylon backplates, and 85 lb lift bladders. Some of these have improved safety or convenience.

Dive Rite marketed the first commercially manufactured backplates in 1984, and a wing for diving twin cylinders in 1985. Other tech diving wing manufacturers include Ocean Management Systems, Halcyon, Apeks and Oxycheq. Other BC manufacturers include Sherwood, Zeagle, Scubapro, Mares, AP Diving and Cressisub.

By 2000 Mares S.p.A. introduced the HUB integrated buoyancy compensator and scuba regulator system, a jacket style BC using a pneumatic control valve on the left side of the harness to operate inflation and deflation valves. The pneumatic inflation and deflation control valve made it unnecessary to lift the dump valve to get outflow as it remotely operated the valve which was positioned to be at a high point in normal operation. Air pressure from the regulator was also used to tension the strap attaching the cylinder to the harness, The regulator was assembled specifically for use on this unit, with non-standard hose lengths and a low pressure manifold to distribute the gas through attached hoses. Two second stage demand valves were supplied, and a submersible pressure gauge. There was also a manual inflation hose normally tucked away under a flap, and weight pockets. As the assembly included a scuba regulator and a buoyancy compensator it was subject to both EN 250 and EN1809.

== See also ==
- Ascending and descending (diving) – Procedures for safe ascent and descent in underwater diving
- Buoyancy control in scuba diving – Essential safety skill
- Diver trim – Balance and orientation skills of an underwater diver
- Emergency ascent – Ascent to the surface by a diver in an emergency
- Human factors in diving equipment design – Influence of the interaction between the user and the equipment on design
- List of inflatable manufactured goods – Links to Wikipedia articles on notable classes of inflatable goods
- Low impact diving – Scuba diving that has minimal environmental effect
- Scuba skills – Skills required to scuba-dive safely

=== Other buoyancy related equipment ===
There are other types of equipment worn by divers that affect buoyancy:

- Backplate – Type of back-mount scuba harness
- Diving cylinder – Container to supply high pressure gas for diving operations
- Diving weighting system – Ballast carried to counteract buoyancy
- Dry suit – Watertight clothing that seals the wearer from cold and hazardous liquids
- Wetsuit – Garment worn to provide thermal protection while wet
