= Diver trim =

Balance and orientation skills of an underwater diver

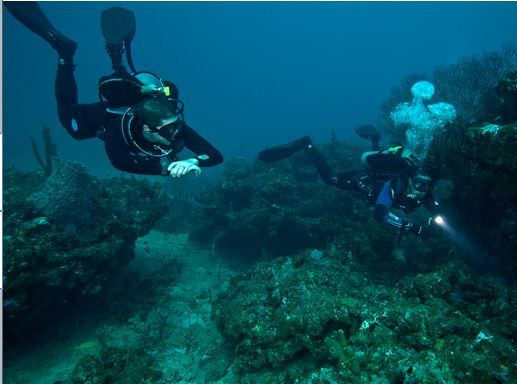
Scuba divers with good trim and neutral buoyancy

The trim of a diver is the orientation of the body in the water, determined by posture and the distribution of weight and volume along the body and equipment, as well as by any other forces acting on the diver. Both static trim and its stability affect the convenience and safety of the diver while under water and at the surface. Midwater trim is usually considered at approximately neutral buoyancy for a swimming scuba diver, and neutral buoyancy is necessary for efficient maneuvering at constant depth, but surface trim may be at significant positive buoyancy to keep the head above water.

In midwater, a swimming diver is propelled with least exertion when the body is aligned with the direction of travel, as this minimises drag, Finning effort required to maintain depth is additional to the effort to move in the desired direction. Stable level trim is efficient when swimming at constant depth. Competent recreational scuba divers will usually spend most of a dive at near neutral buoyancy and level trim, clear of the bottom and other solid surfaces.

When working on the bottom it is usually safer and more comfortable to be trimmed more upright, particularly in a dry suit, and negative buoyancy can help stability while working. This is common practice for Surface supplied divers, but they may also find level trim useful if they operate in midwater at neutral buoyancy.

== Surface trim ==
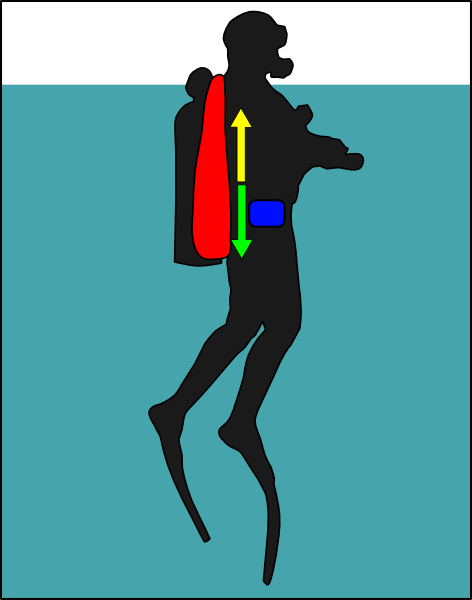
Diver stable in vertical attitude at the surface

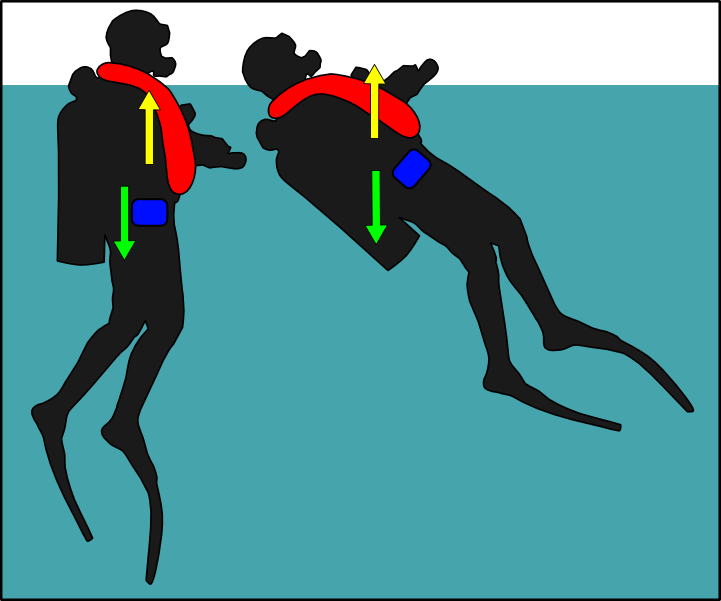
Diver with centre of buoyancy a long way to the front will rotate backwards by a large angle

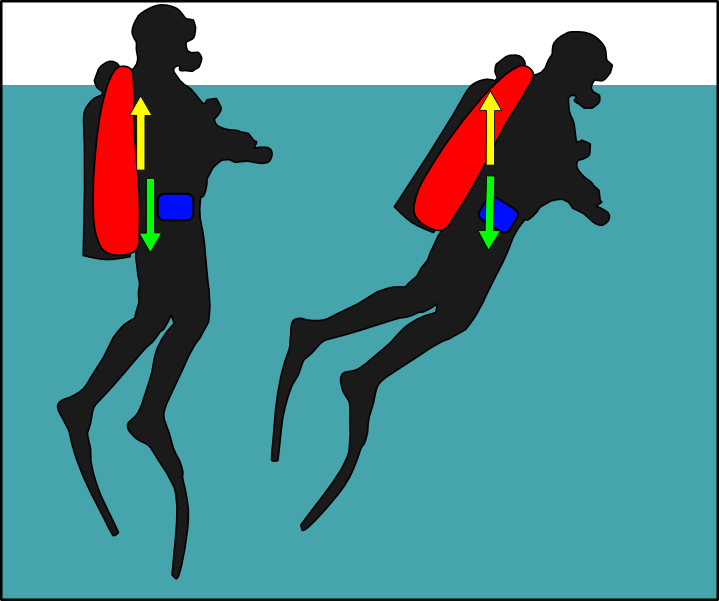
Diver with centre of buoyancy to the back will rotate forwards

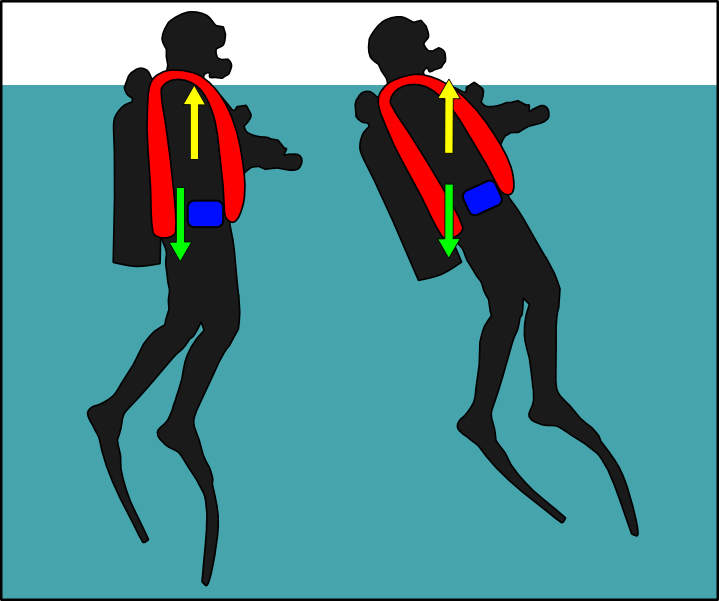
Diver with high centre of buoyancy will tend to rotate less

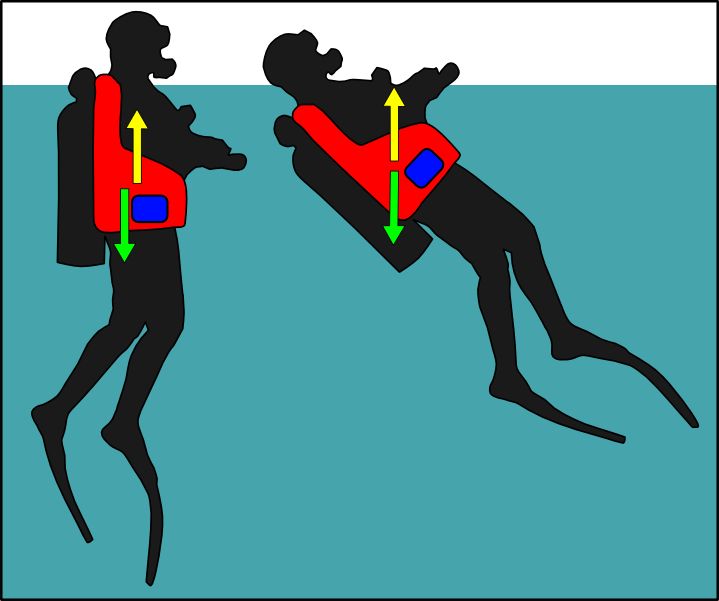
Diver with low centre of buoyancy may rotate further, but not very strongly

When the buoyancy compensator of a scuba diver is inflated at the surface to provide positive buoyancy, the positions of the centre of buoyancy and centre of gravity of the diver are generally different. The vertical and horizontal separation of these centroids will determine the static trim of the diver at the surface. The diver can usually overcome the trimming moment of buoyancy, but this requires constant directed effort, albeit usually not a great deal of effort. This allows a conscious diver to adjust trim to suit the circumstances such as the choice between swimming face down or face up, or remaining vertical for best field of view or visibility.

The position of the diver's centre of gravity is determined by the distribution of weight, which is in most cases determined by the actual equipment in use. Trim of the centre of gravity is usually achieved by selection of cylinder material and positioning of main ballast weights and trim weights. Aluminium cylinders are generally less negatively buoyant than steel cylinders of equivalent capacity, and high pressure cylinders more negative than low pressure cylinders of the same material.

Similarly, much of the diver's buoyancy is determined by the equipment in use, particularly the buoyancy compensator, which can significantly influence centre of buoyancy shifts as it is inflated and deflated.

Stable trim implies that the centre of buoyancy is directly above the centre of gravity. Any horizontal offset will generate a moment which will rotate the diver until the equilibrium condition is restored.

Several cases are possible for an upright diver at the surface. This attitude is stable only when the centre of buoyancy is nearer the head then the centre of gravity, and on the same vertical line. Otherwise the diver will tend to rotate forwards or backwards until the centre of buoyancy is directly above the centre of gravity. In almost all cases the centre of buoyancy is nearer the head than the centre of gravity, and buoyancy compensators are all designed to provide this as the default condition, as an inverted diver floating at the surface is at risk of drowning. This can happen if a large volume of gas fills the legs of a dry suit.

The lateral offset of centre of buoyancy from centre of gravity is generally insignificant unless the diver has been weighted asymmetrically between the sides, which is unusual, and seldom intentional, though it can occur when weights are ditched or lost from one side only, a loose weight belt shifts, or a large amount of gas from a sling cylinder has been used. With a sidemount rebreather there can be a noticeable cyclic shift of buoyancy during the breathing cycle, as the counterlung is offset to the side from the diver's lungs.

The offset in the forward/backward axis is quite frequently significant, and is usually the dominant factor in determining static trim attitude. At the surface, it is generally undesirable to be trimmed strongly face down, but it is useful to be able to trim face down at will. Vertical trim is acceptable providing it can be overcome for swimming

There can be a conflict between the requirements for good surface trim and large reserve of buoyancy, particularly with back inflation systems, where a large volume is more likely to move the centre of buoyancy further back than the centre of gravity, and moving the centre of gravity further back by shifting weights may compromise trim stability at neutral buoyancy.

There is also a conflict between the requirements for a lifejacket, which must keep the wearer face up and afloat even when unconscious, and a buoyancy compensator, which should allow the diver freedom to control trim attitude both underwater and floating at the surface. Diving buoyancy compensators are generally labelled with a warning that they are not a substitute for life jackets.

Ditching weights at the surface will move the centre of gravity slightly further back if the weights were carried forward of the centre of gravity, and in almost all cases will result in a stable condition where the diver is more horizontal in the water.

== Underwater trim ==
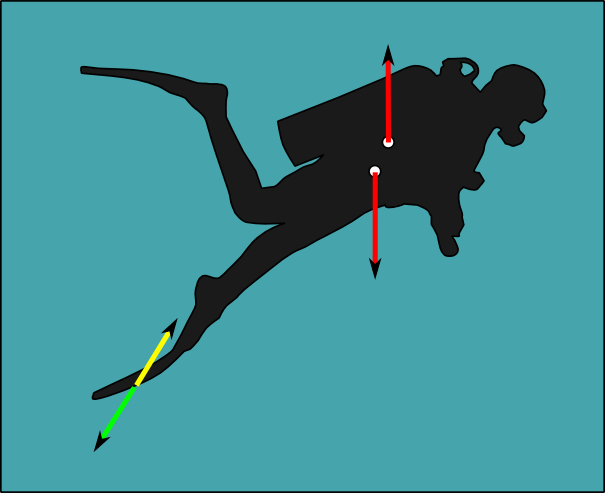
Diver trimmed with weight far towards the feet: The static moments of buoyancy and weight cause the feet to rotate downwards, and the thrust from finning is then also directed downwards

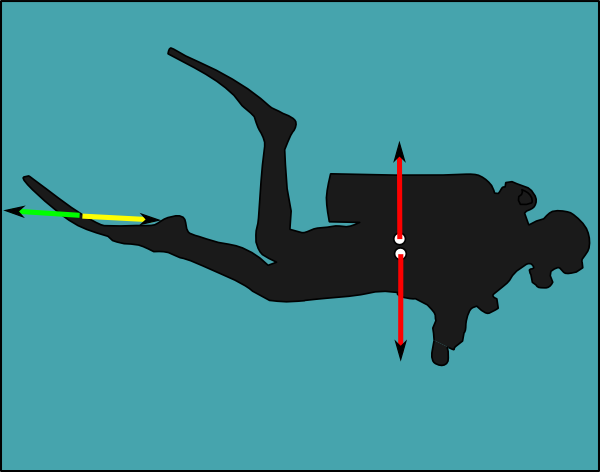
Diver with weight and centre of buoyancy aligned for level trim: The static moments of buoyancy and weight keep the diver horizontal, and fin thrust can be aligned with direction of motion for best efficiency

Underwater trim is the diver's attitude in the water, in terms of balance and alignment with the direction of motion. Accurately controlled trim reduces swimming effort, as it reduces the sectional area of the diver passing through the water. The effect of swimming with a head up angle of about 15°, as is quite common in poorly trimmed divers, can be an increase in drag in the order of 50%. A slight head down trim is recommended to reduce downthrust during finning, and this reduces silting and fin impact with the bottom.

=== Preferred trim ===
The free-swimming diver may need to trim erect or inverted at times, but in general, a horizontal trim has advantages both for reduction of drag when swimming horizontally, and for observing the bottom. A horizontal trim allows the diver to direct propulsive thrust from the fins directly to the rear, which minimises disturbance of sediments on the bottom, and reduces the risk of striking delicate benthic organisms with the fins. A stable horizontal trim requires that diver's centre of gravity is directly below the centre of buoyancy (the centroid) when in a horizontal position. Small errors can be compensated fairly easily, but large offsets may make it necessary for the diver to constantly exert significant effort towards maintaining the desired attitude, if it is actually possible.

The longitudinal position of the centre of buoyancy depends on two major factors: The volume distribution of the diver, and volume distribution of the equipment worn and carried by the diver. The male human body, on average, has a centroid of volume closer to the head than the female, though this is quite variable, and is affected by body mass index, lung volume, and limb proportions, as well as posture, and the distance between the centre of gravity and the centre of buoyancy is usually greater in males than in females. It is generally impracticable to modify the volume or density distribution of the diver, and much of the equipment must be worn in a specific fixed position for functional reasons. Some control of the volume distribution of the diving suit is possible, but may conflict with insulation requirements. Divers with a centre of buoyancy closer to the feet may find reducing suit volume near the feet helpful. The lower legs of a dry suit must be loose enough to pass the feet, and this allows excess gas to accumulate where it affects trim the most. Gaiters may be used over a dry suit on the lower legs to limit the size of gas bubble that can form in that area. This can also reduce drag when finning by reducing folds across the water flow.

Diver inversion followed by suit blowup was a significant hazard with serious consequences to divers using standard diving dress, and many standard diving suits were made with lacing at the back of the legs to minimise excess volume in this area. The lacing was awkward to reach by the diver and was handled by a tender. This feature has not been used on more recent dry suits, which tend to be less baggy, and are not usually integrally connected to the internal gas space of the helmet.

=== Back mount ===
Back mounted cylinders may be shifted in the harness by a small amount, longer cylinders shift the centres of both buoyancy and gravity towards the feet, and the volume distribution of the buoyancy compensator has a large influence when inflated. Most of the control of trim available to the diver is in the positioning of ballast weights. The main ballast weights therefore should be placed as far as possible to provide an approximately neutral trim, which is usually possible by wearing the weights around the waist or just above the hips on a weight belt, or in weight pockets provided in the buoyancy compensator jacket or harness for this purpose. Fine tuning of trim can be done by placing smaller weights along the length of the diver to bring the centre of gravity to the desired position. There are several ways this can be done.

=== Trim correction ===
Ankle weights provide a large lever arm for a small amount of weight and are very effective at correcting head-down trim problems, but the addition of mass to the feet can increase the work of propulsion significantly. This may not be noticed on a relaxed dive, where there is no need to swim far or fast, but if there is an emergency and the diver needs to swim hard, ankle weights will be a significant handicap, particularly if the diver is marginally fit for the conditions, as they must be accelerated twice for each fin stroke. The same effect occurs with heavy fins.

Tank bottom weights provide a much shorter lever arm, so need to be a much larger proportion of the total ballast, but do not interfere with propulsive efficiency the way ankle weights do. However, they may adversely affect roll stability by causing a dorsal shift in the centre of gravity. There are not really any other convenient places below the weight belt to add trim weights, so the most effective option is to carry the main weights as low as necessary, by using a suitable harness or integrated weight pocket buoyancy compensator which actually allows the weights to be placed correctly, so there is no need for longitudinal trimming.

=== Rebreathers ===
A less common problem is found when rebreathers have a counterlung towards the top of the torso. In this case there may be a need to attach weights near the counterlung. This is usually not a problem, and weight pockets for this purpose are often built into the rebreather harness or casing, and if necessary weights can be attached to the harness shoulder straps. The relatively small weight change due to gas consumption with rebreathers makes trim changes during a dive a minor concern.

=== Sidemount ===
Sidemount harness places the consumable weight of gas on both sides of the diver, relatively ventral in comparison to back mount. This tends to stabilise the diver in horizontal trim. As the gas is consumed from one cylinder at a time, the lateral centre of gravity tends to shift. If the gas pressure remaining is kept reasonably balanced, the trim effects will be small, but can be larger following a long decompression on a dedicated gas. Exactly the same effect occurs with sling decompression cylinders with back mount. The bladder of most sidemount harnesses is designed to concentrate the adjustable buoyancy over the small of the back, which is very close to the centre of gravity of the gas, so trim and balance in midwater should normally be quite stable during the dive once weighting is correct.

One of the features of sidemount is the facility to unclip the cylinders from the harness at the lower support points and swing them forward to reduce the cross-sectional width of the diver to pass through narrow gaps. If the cylinders are not close to neutrally buoyant at the lower ends, this will affect trim during such maneuvers, as the lever arm is large.

=== Buoyancy shifts ===
At most times during a dive the Buoyancy compensator is only partially filled, and the air in it will rise to the highest part of the bladder that it can reach without having to flow downhill on the way to get there. This may cause air to be trapped in one side of the bladder at times, which may upset the trim by rotating the diver so that the side with more air in it shifts upward. This is particularly prevalent with horseshoe style wing bladders, where there is no connection between the sides at the bottom of the wing.

This is seldom much of a problem, and can be corrected by simply trimming the shoulders up until the air moves to the top of the bladder and balances between the sides. It does, however, mean that if the diver rolls to one side air will shift to the upper side and tend to hold the diver in this position. Similarly if a diver trims steeply head up or down, the air will flow to the higher end of the BC and this will tend to keep the diver stable in this position. This can be exacerbated by similar but more extreme air shifts in a dry suit, which is the main reason why dry suits should be dived with the minimum air necessary to expand the undersuit.

The amount of gas needed in the buoyancy compensator decreases during a dive, as the mass of gas in the cylinders is used up. This is greatest for long duration dives on open circuit scuba, when large amounts of air or nitrox are used, less for short shallow recreational dives using a single cylinder, and least for moderate to short duration rebreather dives. Ideally, the centre of gravity of the gas in the cylinders and in the buoyancy compensator will be in the same longitudinal position when trimmed level.

== See also ==
- Diving weighting system – Ballast carried to counteract buoyancy
- Buoyancy compensator – Equipment for controlling the buoyancy of a diver
