= Trim weights =

Trim weights may refer to:

- Trim weights (diving) – Relatively small ballast weights worn by an underwater diver to adjust position of the centre of gravity while submerged
- Trim weights (flying)
