= Diving weighting system =

Ballast carried to counteract buoyancy

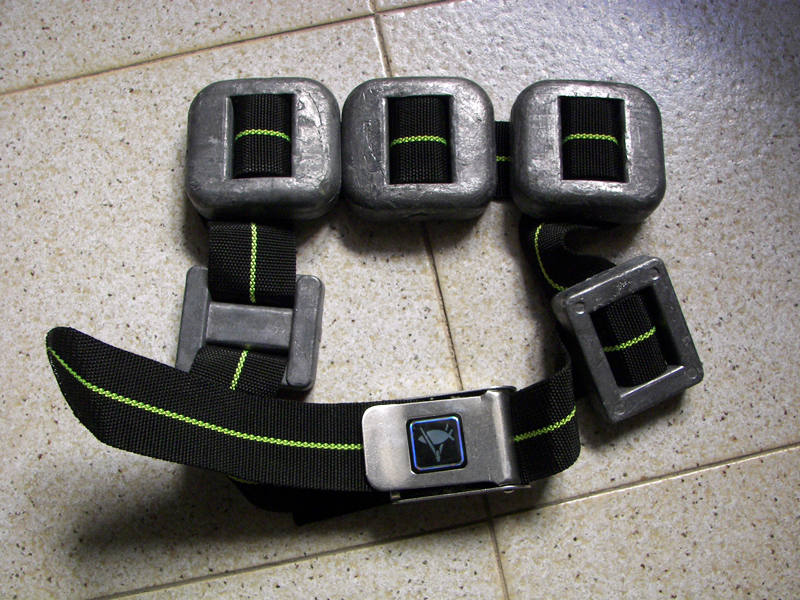
- Conventional scuba weight-belt with quick-release buckle
- Other names: Dive weights; Weight-belt; Integrated weights; Trim weights
- Uses: Buoyancy correction and trim adjustment of underwater divers
- Related items: Buoyancy compensation device

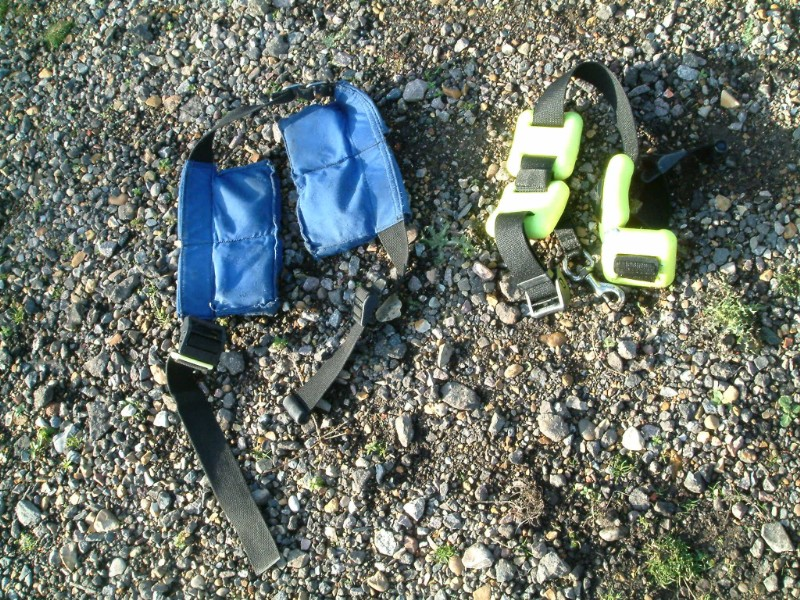
A bag weight belt and a traditional weight belt

A diving weighting system is ballast weight added to a diver or diving equipment to counteract excess buoyancy. They may be used by divers or on equipment such as diving bells, submersibles or camera housings.

Divers wear diver weighting systems, weight belts or weights to counteract the buoyancy of other diving equipment, such as diving suits and aluminium diving cylinders, and buoyancy of the diver. The scuba diver must be weighted sufficiently to be slightly negatively buoyant at the end of the dive when most of the breathing gas has been used, and needs to maintain neutral buoyancy at safety or obligatory decompression stops. During the dive, buoyancy is controlled by adjusting the volume of air in the buoyancy compensation device (BCD) and, if worn, the dry suit, in order to achieve negative, neutral, or positive buoyancy as needed. The amount of weight required is determined by the maximum overall positive buoyancy of the fully equipped but unweighted diver anticipated during the dive, with an empty buoyancy compensator and normally inflated dry suit. This depends on the diver's mass and body composition, buoyancy of other diving gear worn (especially the diving suit), water salinity, weight of breathing gas consumed, and water temperature. It normally is in the range of 2 kilograms (4.4 lb) to 15 kilograms (33 lb). The weights can be distributed to trim the diver to suit the purpose of the dive.

Surface-supplied divers may be more heavily weighted to facilitate underwater work, and may be unable to achieve neutral buoyancy, and rely on the diving stage, bell, umbilical, lifeline, shotline or jackstay for returning to the surface.

Freedivers may also use weights to counteract buoyancy of a wetsuit. However, they are more likely to weight for neutral buoyancy at a specific depth, and their weighting must take into account not only the compression of the suit with depth, but also the compression of the air in their lungs, and the consequent loss of buoyancy. As they have no decompression obligation, they do not have to be neutrally buoyant near the surface at the end of a dive.

If the weights have a method of quick release, they can provide a useful rescue mechanism: they can be dropped in an emergency to provide an instant increase in buoyancy which should return the diver to the surface. Dropping weights increases the risk of barotrauma and decompression sickness due to the possibility of an uncontrollable ascent to the surface. This risk can only be justified when the emergency is life-threatening or the risk of decompression sickness is small, as is the case in freediving and scuba diving when the dive is well short of the no-decompression limit for the depth. Often divers take great care to ensure the weights are not dropped accidentally, and heavily weighted divers may arrange their weights so subsets of the total weight can be dropped individually, allowing for a somewhat more controlled emergency ascent.

The weights are generally made of lead because of its high density, reasonably low cost, ease of casting into suitable shapes, and resistance to corrosion. The lead can be cast in blocks, cast shapes with slots for straps, or shaped as pellets known as "shot" and carried in bags. There is some concern that lead diving weights may constitute a toxic hazard to users and environment, but little evidence of significant risk.

== Function and use of weights ==
Diver weighting systems have two functions; ballast, and trim adjustment.

=== Ballast ===
The primary function of diving weights is as ballast, to prevent the diver from floating at times when he or she wishes to remain at depth.

==== Freediving ====
In freediving (breathhold) the weight system is almost exclusively a weight belt with quick release buckle, as the emergency release of the weights will usually allow the diver to float to the surface even if unconscious, where there is at least a chance of rescue. The weights are used mainly to neutralise the buoyancy of the exposure suit, as the diver is nearly neutral in most cases, and there is little other equipment carried. The weights required depend almost entirely on the buoyancy of the suit. Most freedivers will weight themselves to be positively buoyant at the surface, and use only enough weight to minimise the effort required to swim down against the buoyancy at the start of a dive, while retaining sufficient buoyancy at maximum depth to not require too much effort to swim back up to where the buoyancy becomes positive again. As a corollary to this practice, freedivers will use as thin a wetsuit as comfortably possible, to minimise buoyancy changes with depth due to suit compression.

==== Scuba diving ====
Buoyancy control is considered both an essential skill and one of the most difficult for the novice to master. Lack of proper buoyancy control increases the risk of disturbing or damaging the surroundings, and is a source of additional and unnecessary physical effort to maintain precise depth, which also increases stress.

The scuba diver generally has an operational need to control depth without resorting to a line to the surface or holding onto a structure or landform, or resting on the bottom. This requires the ability to achieve neutral buoyancy at any time during a dive, otherwise the effort expended to maintain depth by swimming against the buoyancy difference will both task load the diver and require an otherwise unnecessary expenditure of energy, increasing air consumption, and increasing the risk of loss of control and escalation to an accident. Maintaining depth by finning necessarily directs part of fin thrust upwards or downwards, and when near the bottom, downward thrust can disturb the benthos and stir up silt. The risk of fin-strike damage is also significant.

A further requirement for scuba diving in most circumstances, is the ability to achieve significant positive buoyancy at any point of a dive. When at the surface, this is a standard procedure to enhance safety and convenience, and underwater it is generally a response to an emergency.

The average human body with a relaxed lungful of air is close to neutral buoyancy. If the air is exhaled, most people will sink in fresh water, and with full lungs, most will float in seawater. The amount of weight required to provide neutral buoyancy to the naked diver is usually trivial, though there are some people who require several kilograms of weight to become neutral in seawater due to low average density and large size. This is usually the case with people with a large proportion of body fat. As the diver is nearly neutral, most ballasting is needed to compensate for the buoyancy of the diver's equipment.

The main components of the average scuba diver's equipment which are positively buoyant are the components of the exposure suit. The two most commonly used exposure suit types are the dry suit and the wet suit. Both of these types of exposure suit use gas spaces to provide insulation, and these gas spaces are inherently buoyant. The buoyancy of a wet suit will decrease significantly with an increase in depth as the ambient pressure causes the volume of the gas bubbles in the neoprene to decrease. Measurements of volume change of neoprene foam used for wetsuits under hydrostatic compression show that about 30% of the volume, and therefore 30% of surface buoyancy, is lost in about the first 10 m, another 30% by about 60 m, and the volume appears to stabilise at about 65% loss by about 100 m. The total buoyancy loss of a wetsuit is proportional to the initial uncompressed volume. An average person has a surface area of about 2 m^{2}, so the uncompressed volume of a full one piece 6 mm thick wetsuit will be in the order of 1.75 x 0.006 = 0.0105 m^{3}, or roughly 10 litres. The mass will depend on the specific formulation of the foam, but will probably be in the order of 4 kg, for a net buoyancy of about 6 kg at the surface. Depending on the overall buoyancy of the diver, this will generally require 6 kg of additional weight to bring the diver to neutral buoyancy to allow reasonably easy descent The volume lost at 10 m is about 3litres, or 3 kg of buoyancy, rising to about 6 kg buoyancy lost at about 60 m. This could nearly double for a large person wearing a two-piece suit for cold water. This loss of buoyancy must be balanced by inflating the buoyancy compensator to maintain neutral buoyancy at depth. A dry suit will also compress with depth, but the air space inside is continuous and can be topped up from a cylinder or vented to maintain an approximately constant volume. A large part of the ballast used by a diver is to balance the buoyancy of this gas space, but if the dry suit has a catastrophic flood, much of this buoyancy may be lost, and some way to compensate is necessary.

Another significant issue in open circuit scuba diver weighting is that the breathing gas is used up during a dive, and this gas has weight, so the total weight of the cylinder decreases, while its volume remains almost unchanged. As the diver needs to be neutral at the end of the dive, particularly at shallow depths for obligatory or safety decompression stops, sufficient ballast weight must be carried to allow for this reduction in weight of gas supply. (the density of air at normal atmospheric pressure is approximately 1.2 kg/m^{3}, or approximately 0.075 lb/ft^{3}) The amount of weight needed to compensate for gas use is easily calculable once the free gas volume and density are known.

Most of the rest of the diver's equipment is negatively buoyant or nearly neutral, and more importantly, does not change in buoyancy during a dive, so its overall influence on buoyancy is static.

While it is possible to calculate the required ballast given the diver and all his or her equipment, this is not done in practice, as all the values would have to be measured accurately. The practical procedure is known as a buoyancy check, and is done by wearing all the equipment, with the tank(s) nearly empty, and the buoyancy compensator empty, in shallow water, and adding or removing weight until the diver is neutrally buoyant. The weight should then be distributed on the diver to provide correct trim, and a sufficient part of the weight should be carried in such a way that it can be removed quickly in an emergency to provide positive buoyancy at any point in the dive. This is not always possible, and in those cases an alternative method of providing positive buoyancy should be used.

A diver ballasted by following this procedure will be negatively buoyant during most of the dive unless the buoyancy compensator is used, to an extent which depends on the amount of breathing gas carried. A recreational dive using a single cylinder may use between 2 and 3 kg of gas during the dive, which is easy to manage, and provided that there is no decompression obligation, end-dive buoyancy is not critical. A long or deep technical dive may use 6 kg of back gas and another 2 to 3 kg of decompression gas. If there is a problem during the dive and reserves must be used, this could increase by up to 50%, and the diver must be able to stay down at the shallowest decompression stop. The extra weight and therefore negative buoyancy at the start of the dive could easily be as much as 13 kg for a diver carrying four cylinders. The buoyancy compensator is partially inflated when needed to support this negative buoyancy, and as breathing gas is used up during the dive, the volume of the buoyancy compensator will be reduced, by venting as required. The inconvenience of additional weight and managing the gas required to compensate for it in a dive that goes according to plan is the price that must be paid for the ability to decompress after an emergency which uses up most of the gas. There is little value in having enough gas to avoid drowning if the diver is killed or crippled by decompression sickness instead.

Examples:

- The common 80 ft^{3} (11 litre, 207 bar) cylinder carries about 6 pounds (2.7 kg) of air when full, so the diver should start the dive about 6 pounds (2.7 kg) negative and use about 1/10 ft^{3} (2.7 L)of air in the BCD to compensate at the start of a dive.
- A twin 12.2 litre 230 bar set carries about 6.7 kilograms (15 lb) of Nitrox when full, so the diver should start the dive about 6.7 kilograms (15 lb) negative and use about 6.7 liters (0.24 cu ft) of gas in the BCD at the start of the dive.
- A twin 12.2 litre 230 bar with an 11 litre 207 bar deep deco mix and a 5.5 litre 207 bar shallow deco gas will carry 10.7 kilograms (24 lb) of gas, and while it is unlikely that all will be used on the dive, it is possible, and the diver should be able to remain at the correct depth for decompression until all the gas is used up.

==== Optimum weighting ====
Optimum weighting for scuba allows the diver to achieve neutral buoyancy at any time during a dive while there is still usable breathing gas in any of the cylinders carried, using the least amount of ballast. Deviations from this optimum either make the diver buoyant while there is still usable breathing gas, which is a disadvantage in emergencies where decompression stops are required, or make the diver more negatively buoyant than necessary at the start of the dive with full cylinders, necessitating more gas in the buoyancy compensator for most of the dive, which is more sensitive to buoyancy changes with change in depth, and may make a larger buoyancy compensator necessary. These disadvantages can be compensated by skill, but more attention and effort is required throughout the dive.

==== Surface-supplied diving ====
In surface-supplied diving, and particularly in saturation diving, the loss of weights followed by positive buoyancy can expose the diver to potentially fatal decompression injury. Consequently, weight systems for surface-supplied diving where the diver is transported to the worksite by a diving bell or stage, are usually not provided with a quick-release system.

Much of the work done by surface-supplied divers is on the bottom, and weighted boots may be used to allow the diver to walk upright on the bottom. When working in this mode, several kilograms beyond the requirement for neutralising buoyancy may be useful, so that the diver is reasonably steady on the bottom and can exert useful force when working.

The lightweight demand helmets in general use by surface-supplied divers are integrally ballasted for neutral buoyancy in the water, so they do not float off the diver's head or pull upwards on the neck, but the larger volume free-flow helmets would be too heavy and cumbersome if they had all the required weight built in. Therefore, they are either ballasted after dressing the diver by fastening weights to the lower parts of the helmet assembly, so the weight is carried on the shoulders when out of the water, or the helmet may be held down by a jocking strap and the harness weights provide the ballast.

The traditional copper helmet and corselet were generally weighted by suspending a large weight from support points on the front and back of the corselet, and the diver often also wore weighted boots to assist in remaining upright. The US Navy Mk V standard diving system used a heavy weighted belt buckled around the waist, suspended by shoulder straps which crossed over the breastplate of the helmet, directly transferring the load to the buoyant helmet when immersed, but with a relatively low centre of gravity. Combined with lacing of the suit legs and heavy weighted shoes, this reduced the risk of inversion accidents.

=== Trim ===
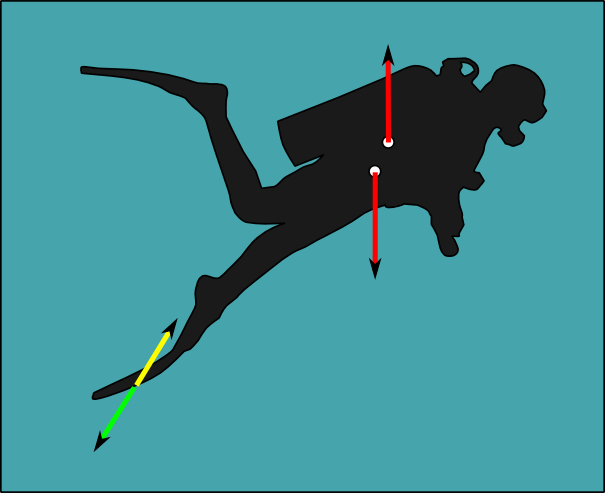
Diver trimmed with weight far towards the feet: The static moments of buoyancy and weight cause the feet to rotate downwards, and the thrust from finning is then also directed downwards

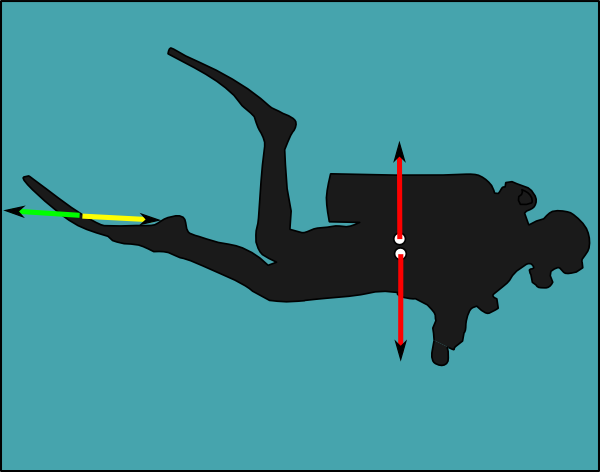
Diver with weight and centre of buoyancy aligned for level trim: The static moments of buoyancy and weight keep the diver horizontal, and fin thrust can be aligned with direction of motion for best efficiency

Trim is the diver's attitude in the water, in terms of balance and alignment with the direction of motion. Optimum trim depends on the task at hand. For recreational divers this is usually swimming horizontally or observing the environment without making contact with benthic organisms. Ascent and descent at neutral buoyancy can be controlled well in horizontal or head-up trim, and descent can be most energy efficient head down, if the diver can effectively equalise the ears in this position. Freediving descents are usually head down, as the diver is usually buoyant at the start of the dive, and must fin downwards. Professional divers usually have work to do at the bottom, often in a fixed location, which is usually easier in upright trim, and some diving equipment is more comfortable and safer to use when relatively upright.

Accurately controlled trim reduces horizontal swimming effort, as it reduces the sectional area of the diver passing through the water. A slight head down trim is recommended to reduce downward directed fin thrust during finning, and this reduces silting and fin impact with the bottom.

Trim weighting is mainly of importance to the free-swimming diver, and within this category is used extensively by scuba divers to allow the diver to remain horizontal in the water without effort. This ability is of great importance for both convenience and safety, and also reduces the environmental impact of divers on fragile benthic communities.

The free-swimming diver may need to trim erect or inverted at times, but in general, a horizontal trim has advantages both for reduction of drag when swimming horizontally, and for observing the bottom. A horizontal trim allows the diver to direct propulsive thrust from the fins directly to the rear, which minimises disturbance of sediments on the bottom, and reduces the risk of striking delicate benthic organisms with the fins. A stable horizontal trim requires that diver's centre of gravity is directly below the centre of buoyancy (the centroid). Small errors can be compensated fairly easily, but large offsets may make it necessary for the diver to constantly exert significant effort towards maintaining the desired attitude, if it is actually possible.

The position of the centre of buoyancy is largely beyond the control of the diver, though some control of suit volume is possible, the cylinder(s) may be shifted in the harness by a small amount, and the volume distribution of the buoyancy compensator has a large influence when inflated. Most of the control of trim available to the diver is in the positioning of ballast weights. The main ballast weights therefore should be placed as far as possible to provide an approximately neutral trim, which is usually possible by wearing the weights around the waist or just above the hips on a weight belt, or in weight pockets provided in the buoyancy compensator jacket or harness for this purpose. Fine tuning of trim can be done by placing smaller weights along the length of the diver to bring the centre of gravity to the desired position. There are several ways this can be done.

Ankle weights provide a large lever arm for a small amount of weight and are very effective at correcting head-down trim problems, but the addition of mass to the feet increases the work of propulsion significantly. This may not be noticed on a relaxed dive, where there is no need to swim far or fast, but if there is an emergency and the diver needs to swim hard, ankle weights will be a significant handicap, particularly if the diver is marginally fit for the conditions.

Tank bottom weights provide a much shorter lever arm, so need to be a much larger proportion of the total ballast, but do not interfere with propulsive efficiency the way ankle weights do. There are not really any other convenient places below the weight belt to add trim weights, so the most effective option is to carry the main weights as low as necessary, by using a suitable harness or integrated weight pocket buoyancy compensator which actually allows the weights to be placed correctly, so there is no need for longitudinal trim correction.

A less common problem is found when rebreathers have a counterlung towards the top of the torso. In this case there may be a need to attach weights near the counterlung. This is usually not a problem, and weight pockets for this purpose are often built into the rebreather harness or casing, and if necessary weights can be attached to the harness shoulder straps.

== Types of weight ==
All or part of the weighting system may be carried in such a way that it can be quickly and easily jettisoned by the diver to increase buoyancy, the rest is usually attached more securely.

=== Ditchable weights ===
Breathhold and scuba divers generally carry some or all of their weights in a way that can be quickly and easily removed while under water. Removal of these weights should ensure that the diver can surface and remain positively buoyant at the surface. The technique for shedding weights in an emergency is a basic skill of scuba diving, which is trained at entry level. Research performed in 1976 analyzing diving accidents noted that in majority of diving accidents, divers failed to release their weight belts. Later evaluations in 2003 and 2004 both showed that failure to ditch the weight remained a problem.

==== Weight belt ====
Weight belts are the most common weighting system currently in use for recreational diving. Weight belts are often made of tough nylon webbing, but other materials such as rubber can be used. Weight belts for scuba and breathhold diving are generally fitted with a quick release buckle to allow the dumping of weight rapidly in an emergency.

A belt made of rubber with traditional pin buckle is called a Marseillaise belt. These belts are popular with freedivers as the rubber contracts on descent as the diving suit and lungs are compressed, keeping the belt tight throughout the dive.

The most common design of weight used with a belt consists of rectangular lead blocks with rounded edges and corners and two slots in them threaded onto the belt. These blocks can be coated in plastic, which further increases corrosion resistance. Coated weights are often marketed as being less abrasive to wetsuits. The weights may be constrained from sliding along the webbing by the use of metal or plastic belt sliders. This style of weight is generally about 1 to 4 pounds (0.45 to 1.81 kg). Larger "hip weights" are usually curved for a better fit, and tend to be 6 to 8 pounds (2.7 to 3.6 kg).

Another popular style has a single slot through which the belt can be threaded. These are sometimes locked in position by squeezing the weight to grip the webbing, but this makes them difficult to remove when less weight is needed.

There are also weight designs which may be added to the belt by clipping on when needed. Some weight belts contain pouches to contain lead weights or round lead shot: this system allows the diver to add or remove weight more easily than with weights threaded onto the belt. The use of shot can also be more comfortable, as the shot conforms to the diver's body. Weight belts using shot are called shot belts. Each shot pellet should be coated to prevent corrosion by sea water, as use of uncoated shotgun shot for sea diving would result in the lead eventually corroding into powdery lead chloride

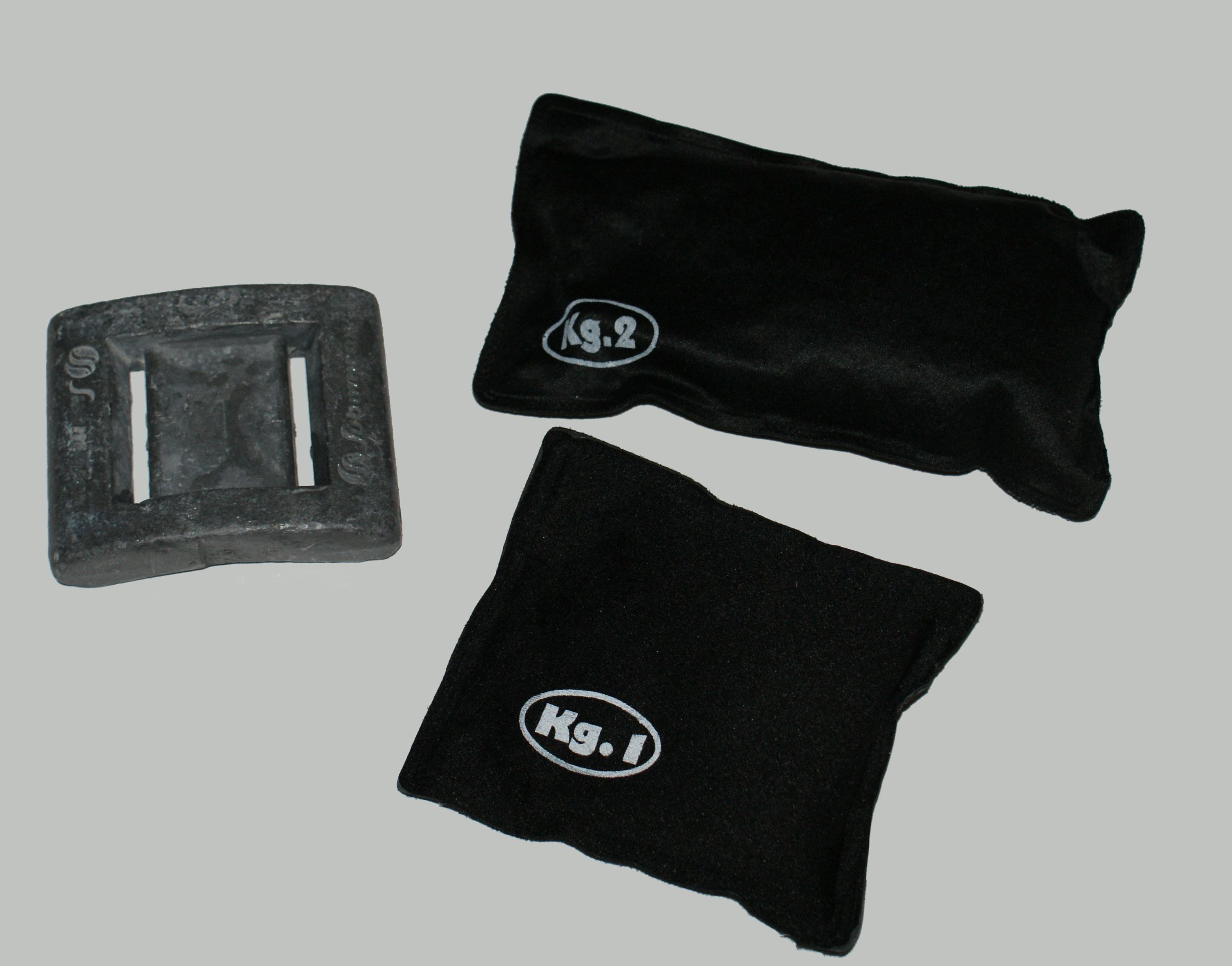
Solid belt weight and pouches holding lead shot for scuba diving

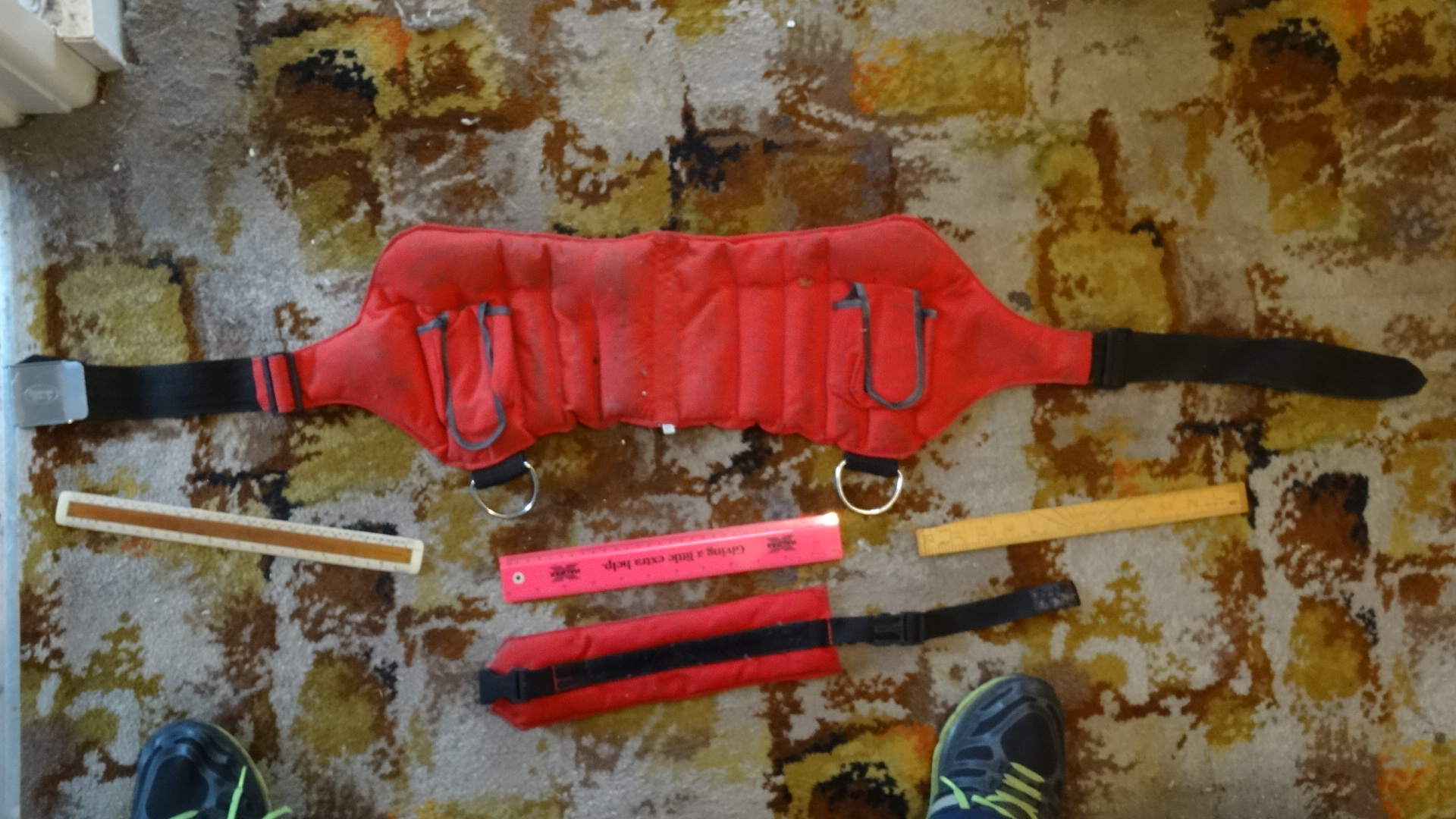
shot belt, and lead-shot-filled anklet, and foot rulers for scale

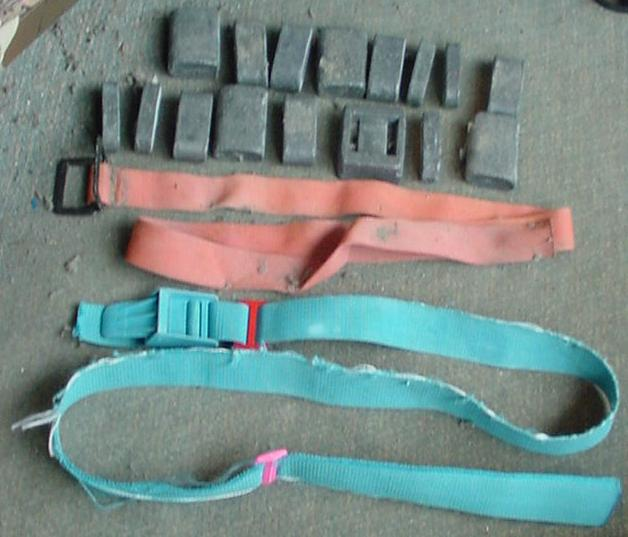
scuba diving weights and weight belts

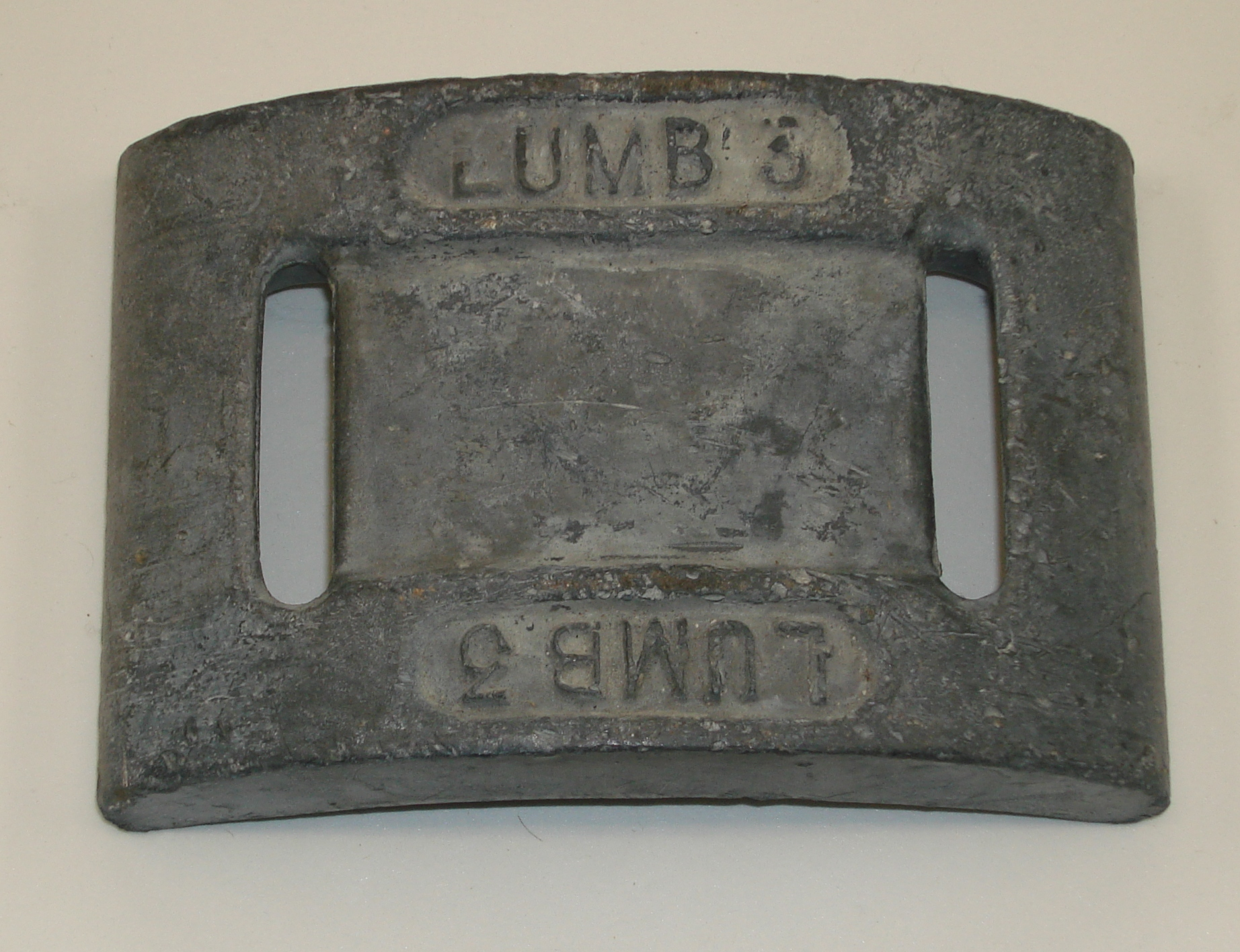
3 kilogram scuba diving hip weight, curved for better fit

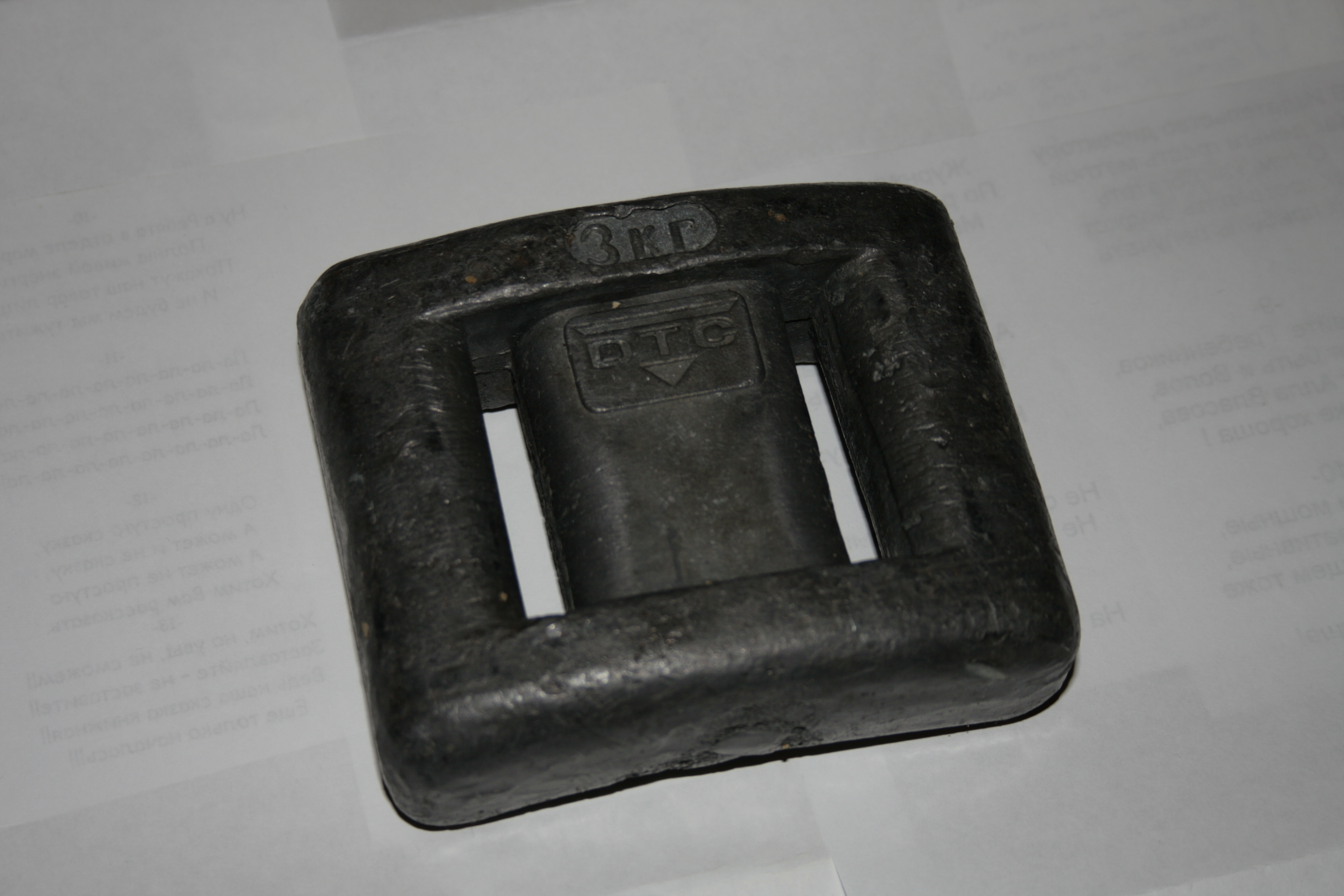
3 kilogram compact scuba diving weight

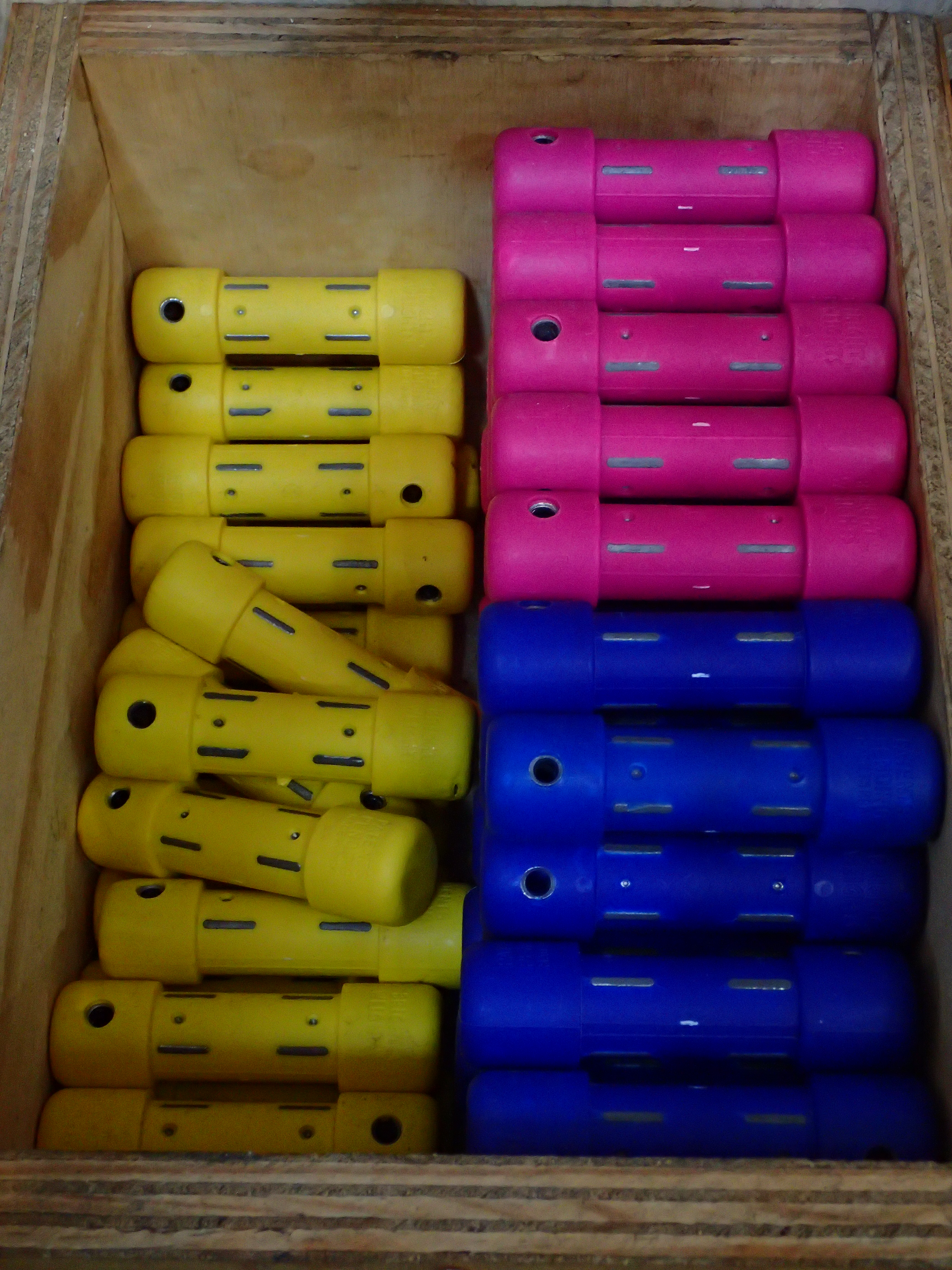
Dive weights - 500g Bright Weights - small lead weights with plastic coating

==== BCD integrated weights ====
These are stored in pockets built into the buoyancy control device. Often a velcro flap or plastic clip holds the weights in place. The weights may also be contained in zippered or velcroed pouches that slot into special pockets in the BCD. The weight pouches often have handles, which must be pulled to drop the weights in an emergency or to remove the weights when exiting the water. Some designs also have smaller "trim pouches" located higher in the BCD, which may help the diver maintain neutral attitude in the water. Trim pouches typically can not be ditched quickly, and are designed to hold only 1-2 pounds (0.5–1 kg) each. Many integrated systems cannot carry as much weight as a separate weight belt: a typical capacity is 6 kg per pocket, with two pockets available. This may not be sufficient to counteract the buoyancy of dry suits with thick undergarments used in cold water.

Some BCD harness systems include a crotch strap to prevent the BCD from sliding up the wearer when inflated, or down when inverted, due to the weights.

==== Weight harness ====
A weight harness usually consists of a belt around the waist holding pouches for the weights, with shoulder straps for extra support and security. Often a velcro flap holds the weights in place. They have handles, which must be pulled to drop the weights in an emergency or to remove the weights when exiting the water. A weight harness allows the weights to be comfortably carried lower on the body than a weight belt, which must be high enough to be supported by the hips. This is an advantage for divers who have no discernible waist, or whose waist is too high to trim correctly if a weight belt is worn. These advantages may also be available on some styles of integrated BC weights. A weight harness may also incorporate a crotch strap or straps to prevent weight shift if the diver is in a steep head down posture.

==== Clip-on weights ====
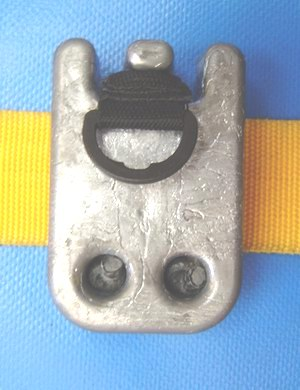
Clip-on trim weight on harness webbing (front view showing D-ring)

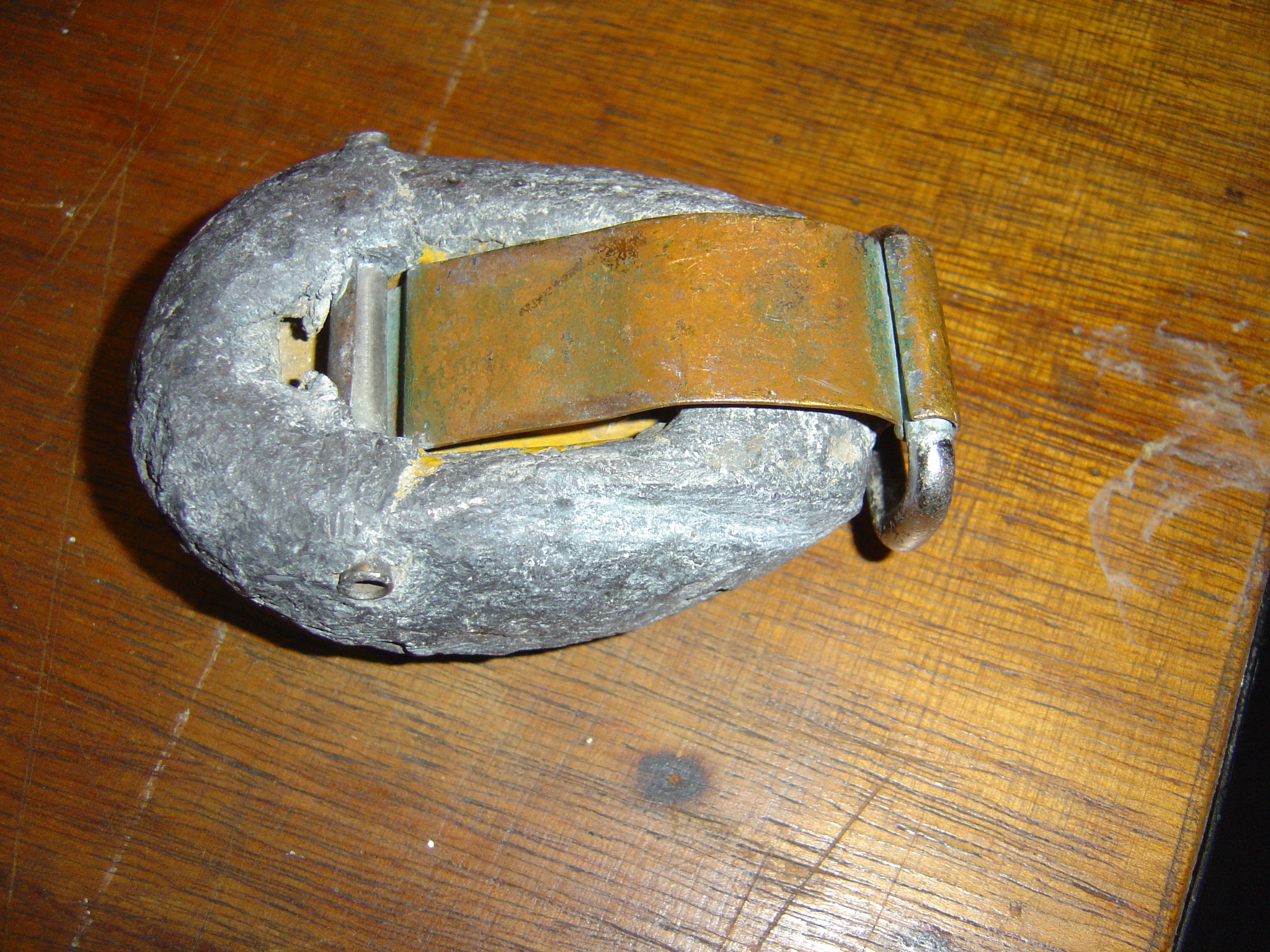
Lead clip-on diving weight by Draeger with bronze spring clip, c. 1980

These are weights which attach to the harness directly, but are removable by disengaging the clip mechanism. They can also be used to temporarily increase the weight of a conventional weight belt. Various sizes have been available, ranging from around 0.5 to 5 kg or more. The larger models are intended as ditchable primary weights, and are used in the same way as BCD integral weights or weight harness weighs, but clipped to the backplate or sidemount harness webbing, and the smaller versions are also useful at trim weights.

==== Backpack weight pouch ====
Some rebreathers (e.g. the Siebe Gorman CDBA) have a pouch containing lead balls each a bit over an inch diameter. The diver can release them by pulling a cord.

=== Fixed weights ===
Surface-supplied divers often carry their weights securely attached to reduce the risk of accidentally dropping them during a dive and losing control of their buoyancy. These may be carried on a weight belt with a secure buckle, supported by a weight harness, connected directly to the diving safety harness, or suspended from the corselet of the helmet. Heavily weighted footwear may also be used to stabilise the diver in an upright position.

In addition to the weight that can be dropped easily ('ditched'), some scuba divers add additional fixed weights to their gear, either to reduce the weight placed on the belt, which can cause lower back pain, or to shift the diver's center of mass to achieve the optimum position in the water.

- Tank weights are attached to the diving cylinder to shift the center of mass backward and towards the head or feet, depending on placement.
  - V-weights are long, narrow, weights which are carried in the groove between twinned cylinders. They may be carried singly or as a pair. Traditionally wedge sectioned lead castings, but also found in solid cylindrical format and as long narrow webbing weight pockets filled with shot.
  - Tank trim weights are smaller weights, usually strapped towards the base of an aluminium cylinder to prevent it from trimming base-upward in seawater when side- or sling-mounted, when the gas is used up.
- Ankle weights, which are typically about 1 lb./0.5 kg of shot, are used to counteract the positive buoyancy of diving suit leggings, made worse in drysuits by the migration of the internal bubble of air to the feet, and positively buoyant fins. Some divers prefer negatively buoyant fins. The additional effort needed when finning with ankle weights or heavy fins increases the diver's gas consumption.
- Metal backplates made from stainless steel, which may be used with wing style buoyancy compensators, move the center of mass upward and backward. Some backplates are fitted with an additional weight, often mounted in the central channel, also called a keel weight or a p-weight.
- Steel diving cylinders are preferred over aluminium cylinders by some divers—particularly cold water divers who must wear a suit that increases their overall buoyancy—because of their negative buoyancy. Most steel tanks stay negatively buoyant even when empty, aluminium tanks may become positively buoyant as the gas they contain is used. High-pressure (300bar) steel tanks are significantly negative.
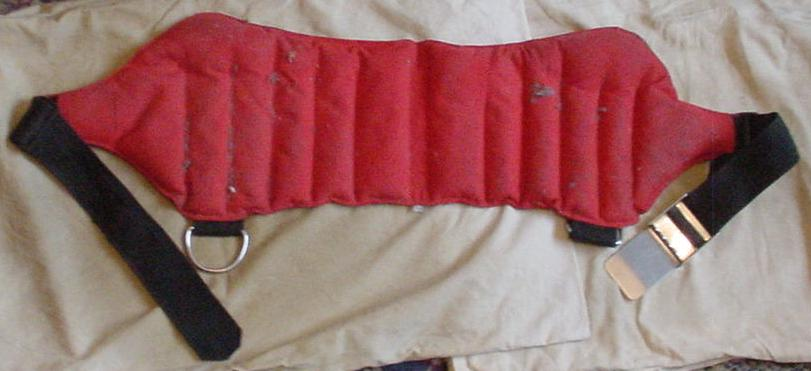
Shot belt for scuba diving

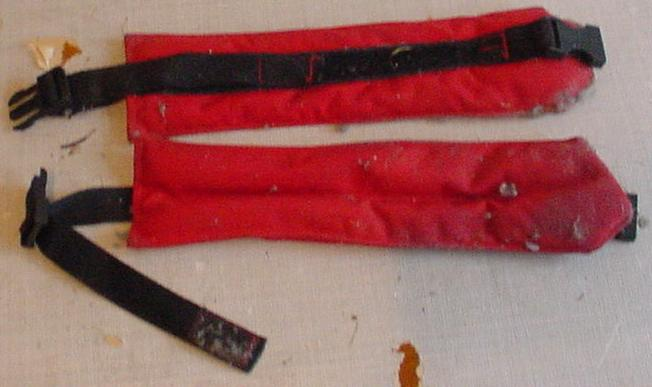
Lead shot anklets for scuba diving

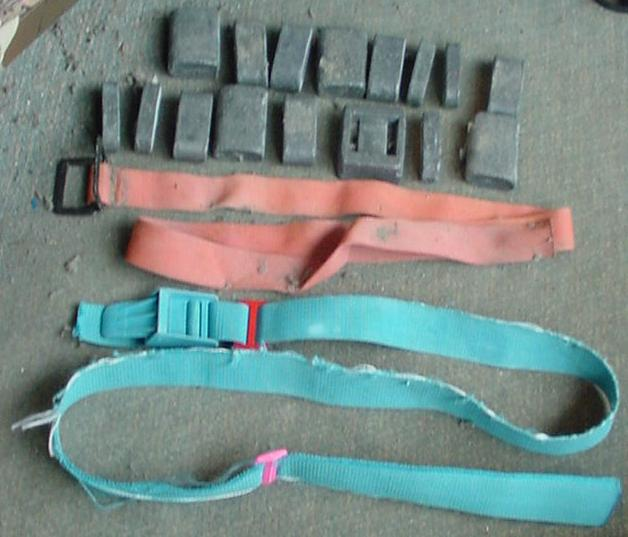
Diving weights and belts, showing two sorts of belt clip

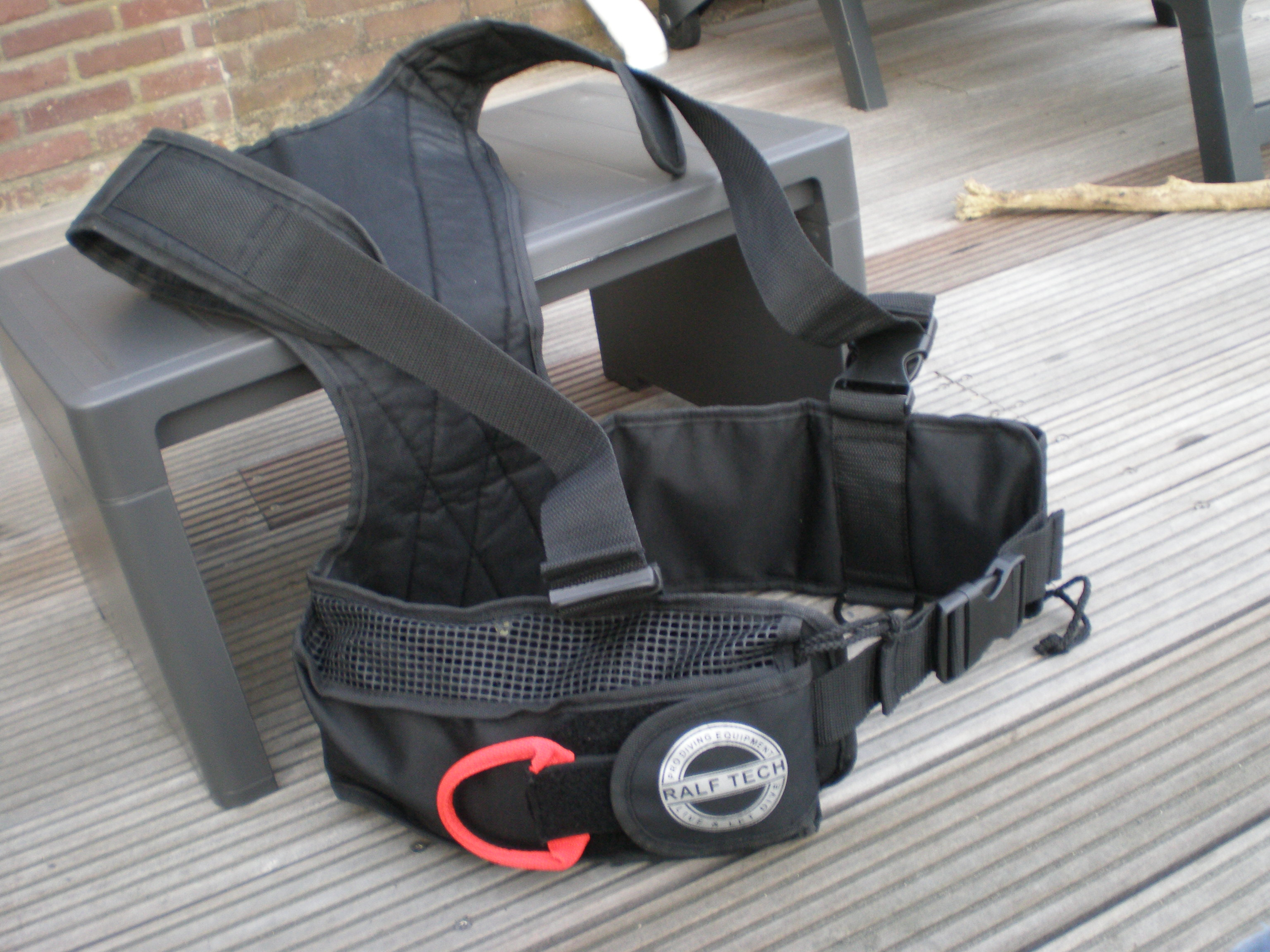
A diving weight harness system with integrated weight pockets

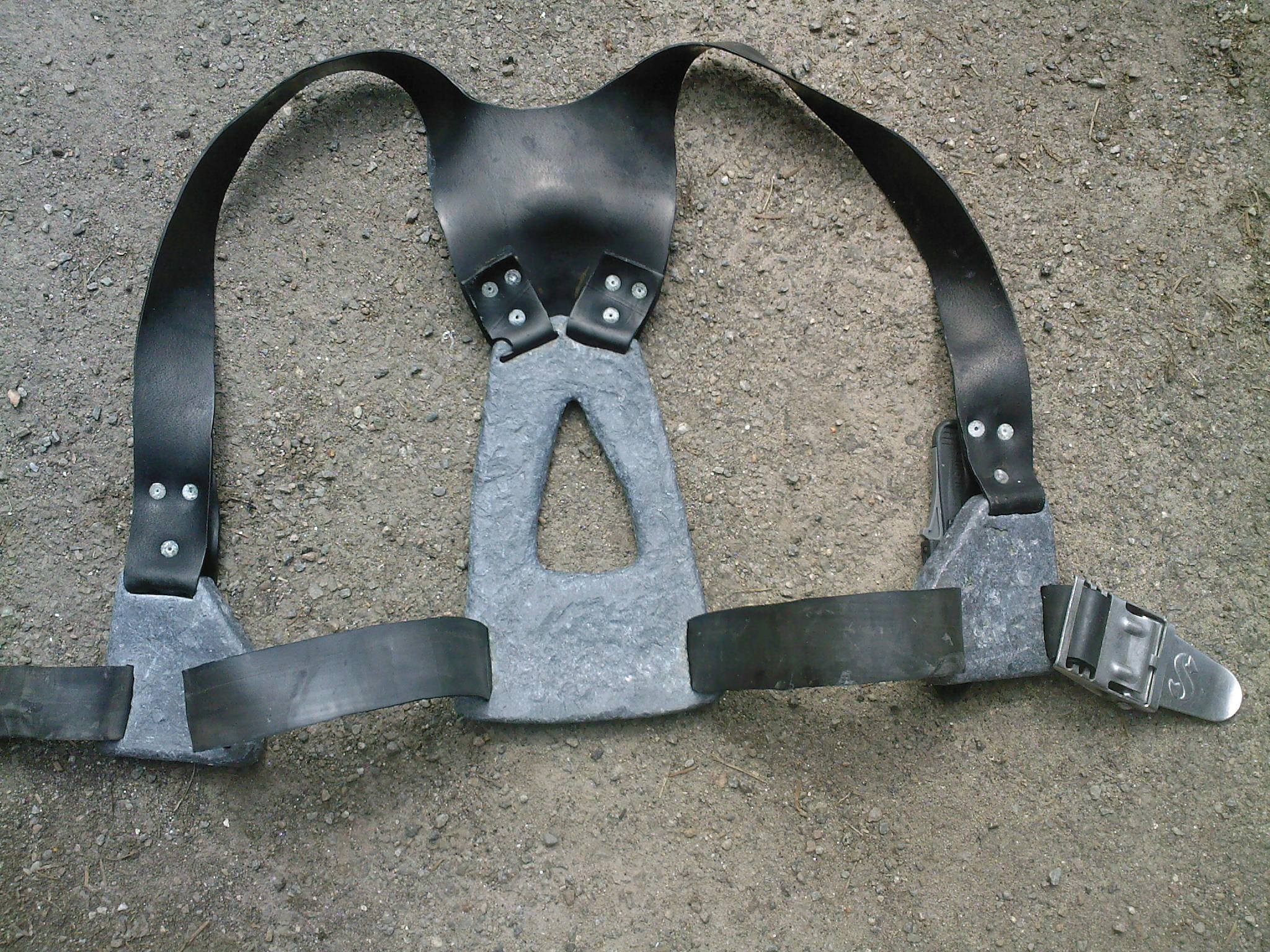
Freediving weight harness for spearfishing

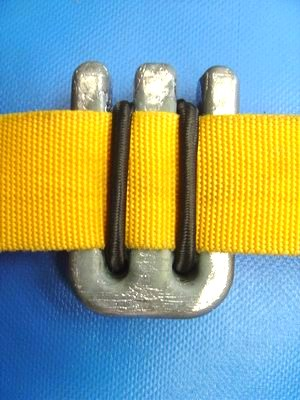
Clip-on trim weight on harness webbing (back view showing shock cord gripping webbing)

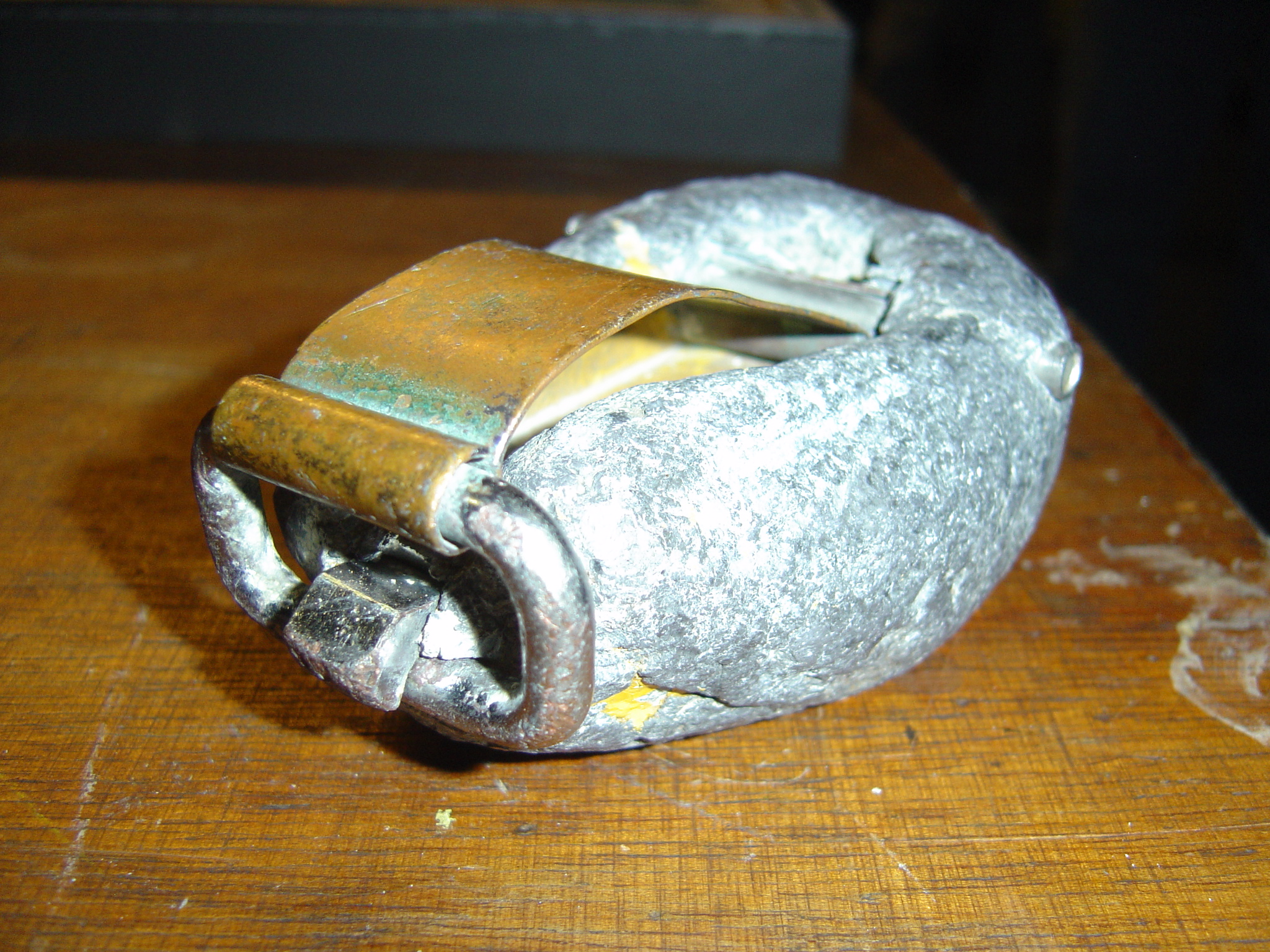
Draeger clip-on weight showing clip mechanism

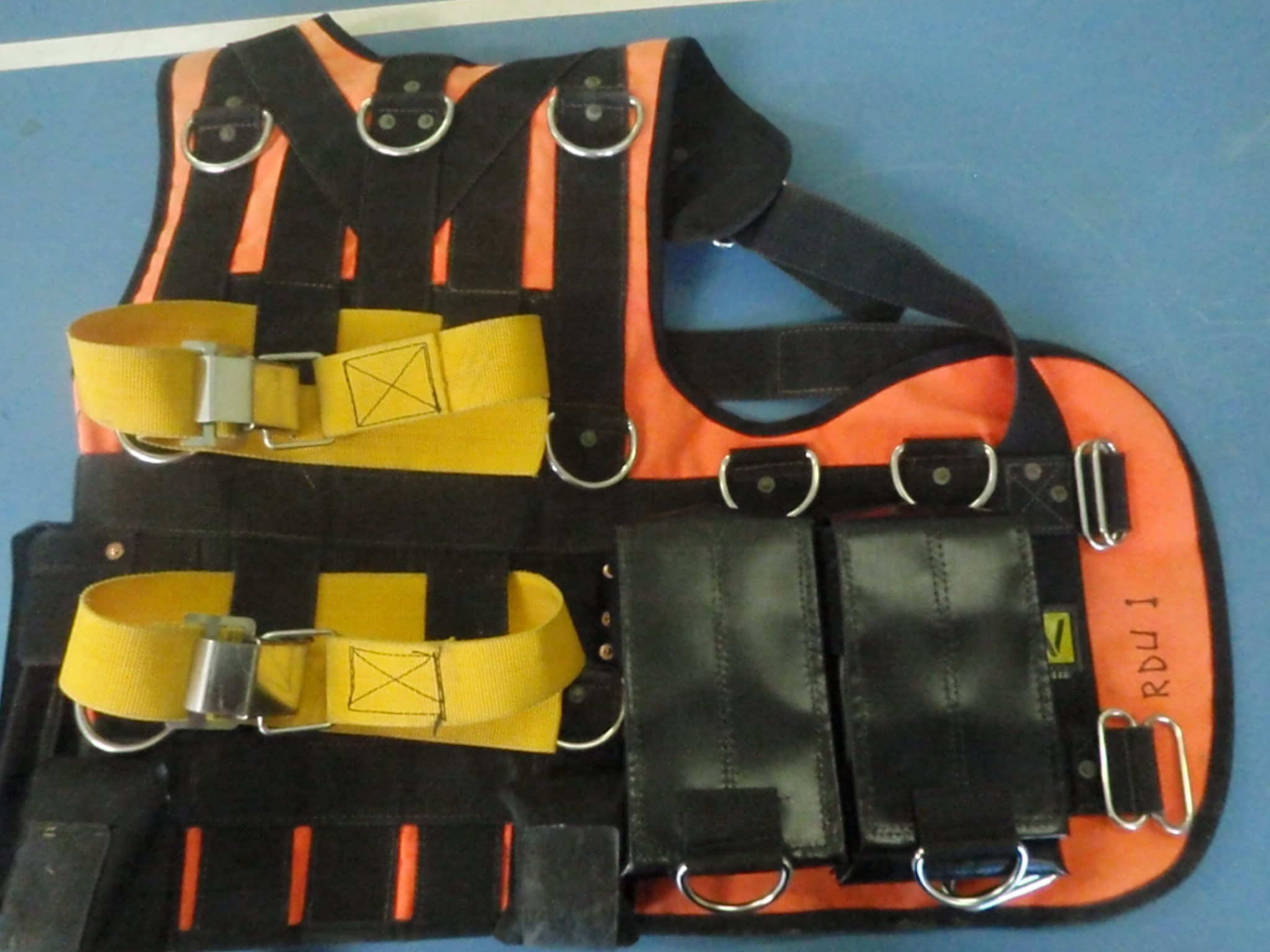
A diver's safety harness with removable weight pockets, used for surface-supplied diving

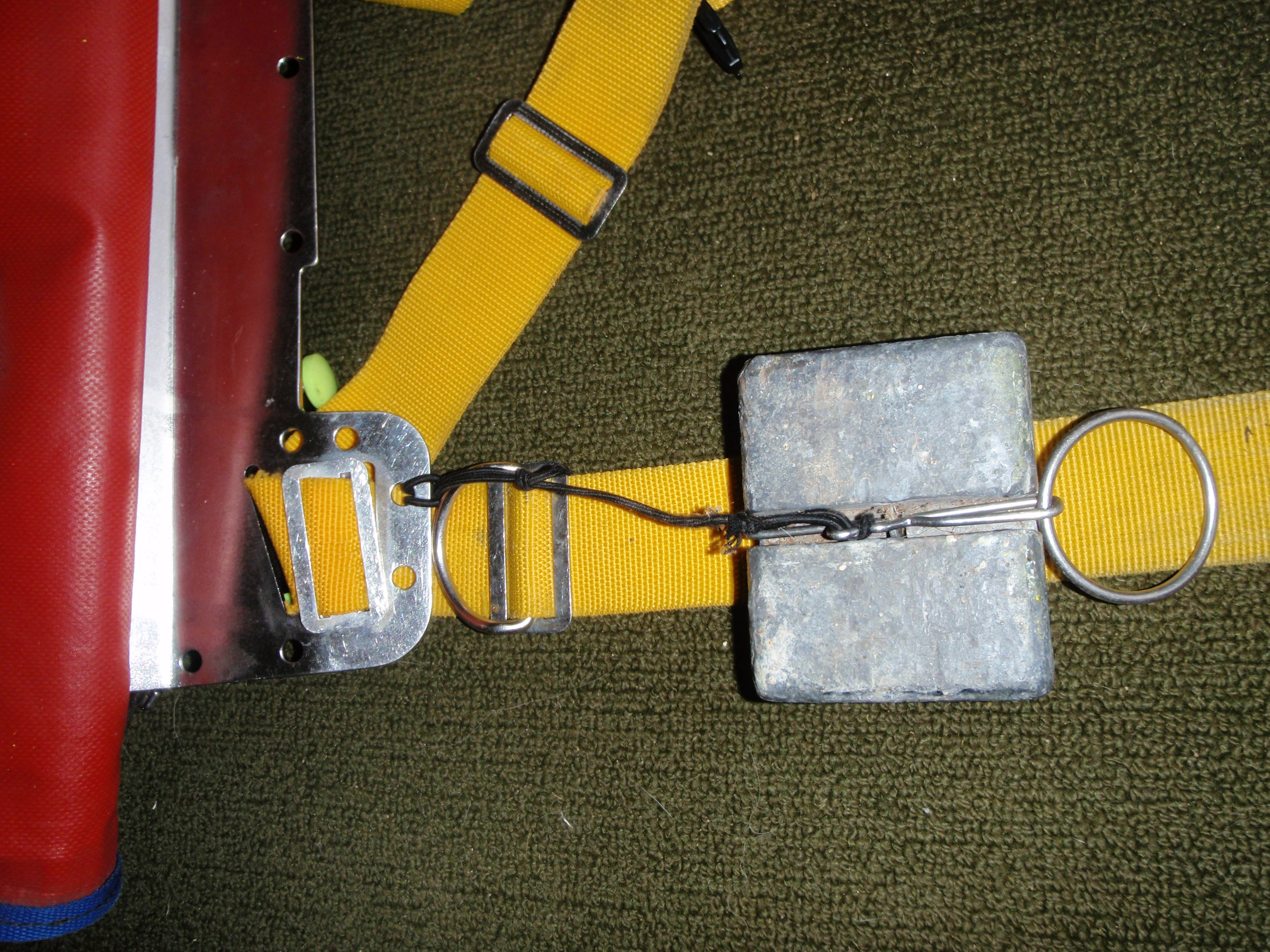
Clip-on main dive weight using a belt bracket and spring clip retainer

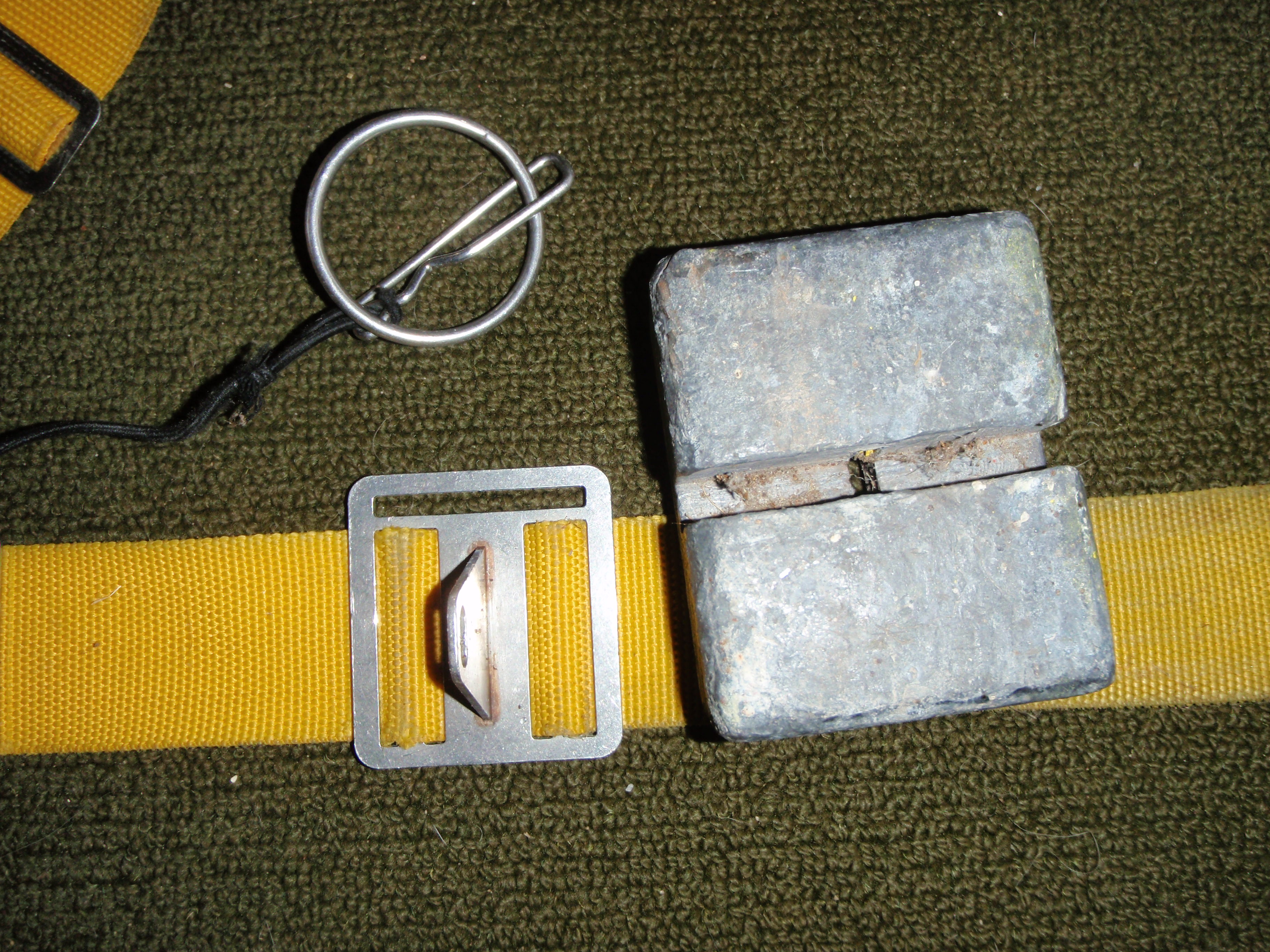
Clip-on main dive weight showing the belt bracket and spring clip retainer

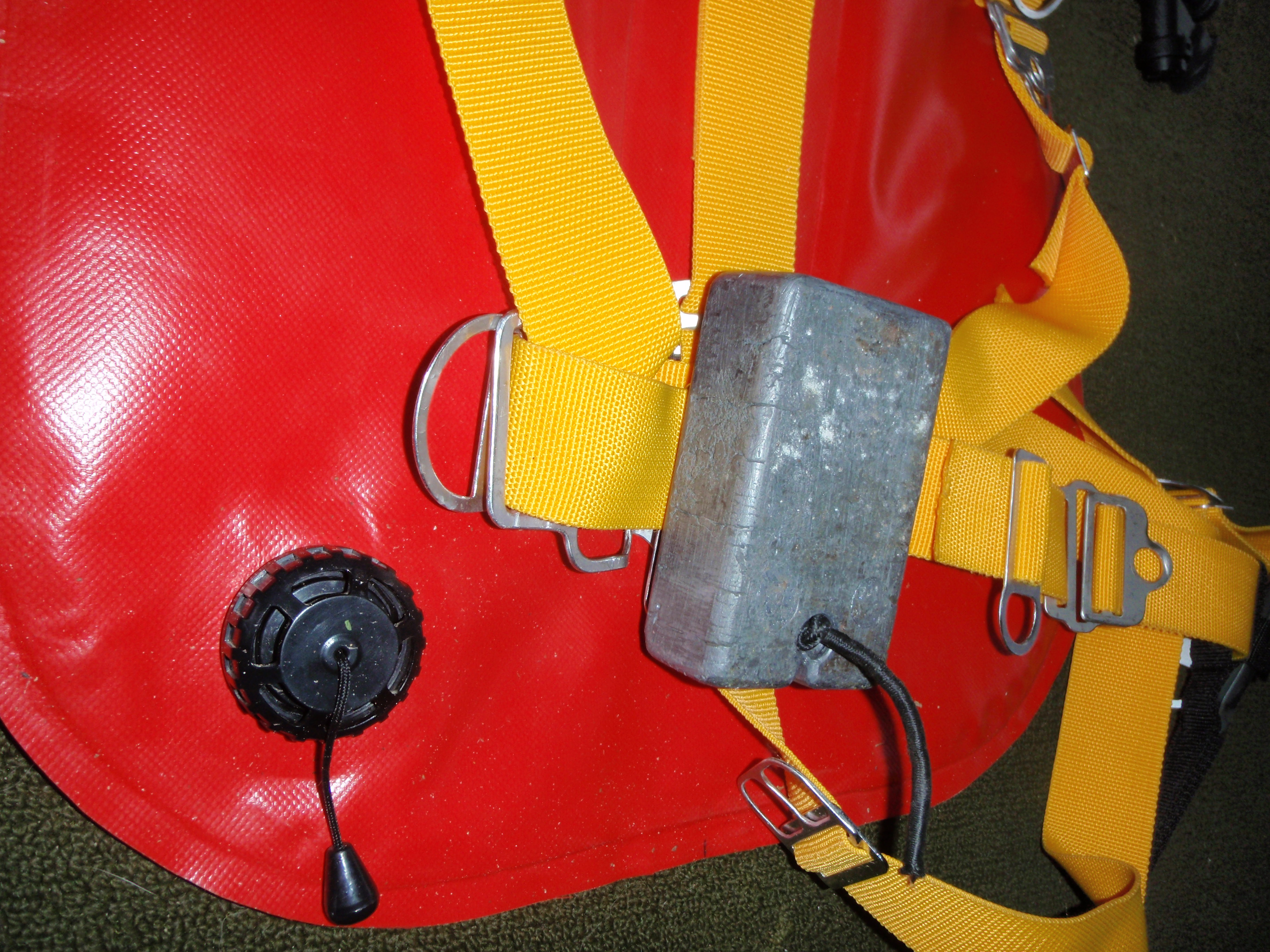
Clip-on monolithic block type main dive weight front view

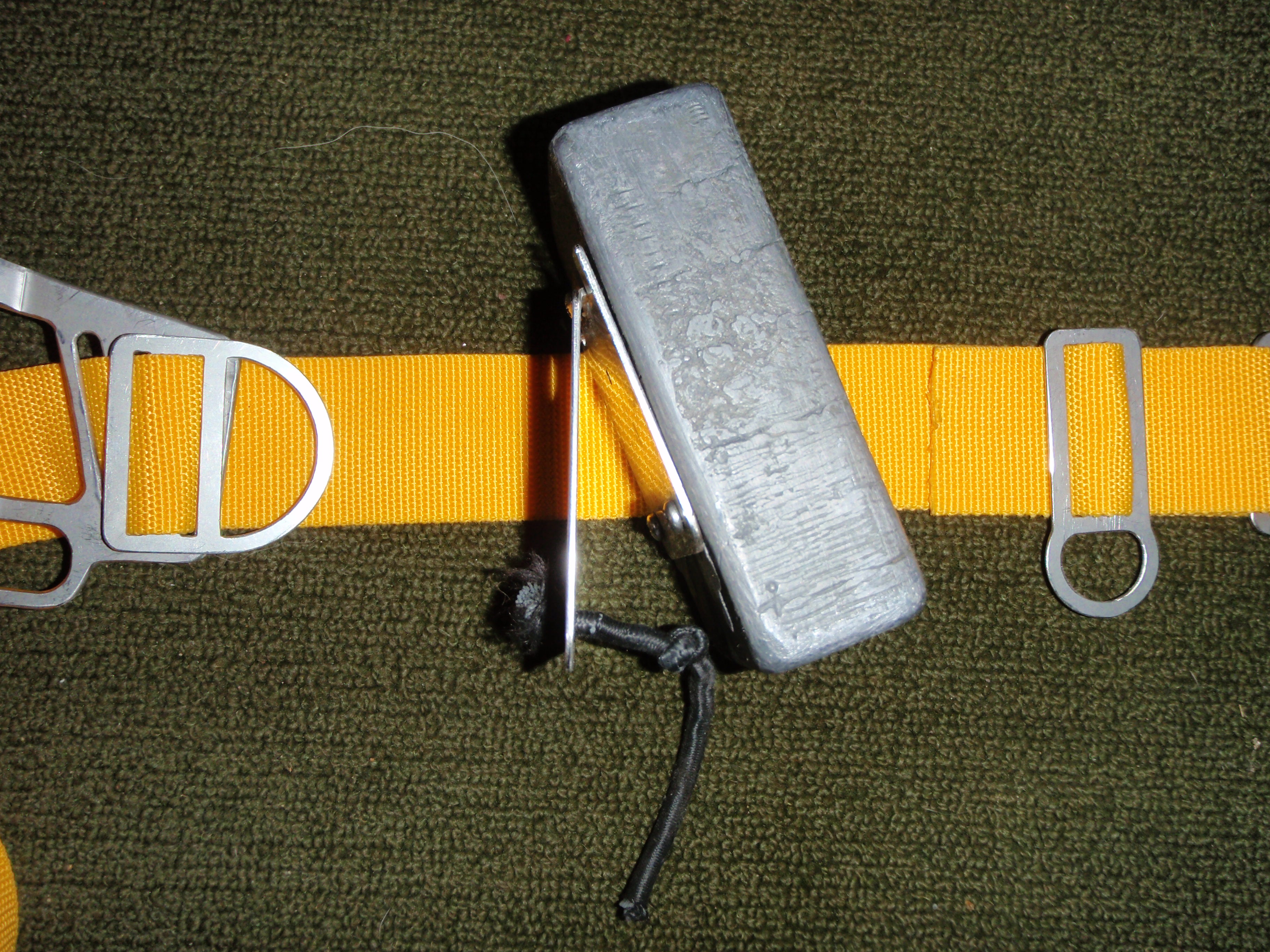
Clip-on monolithic block type main dive weight showing the hinged grip plate and shock cord retainer

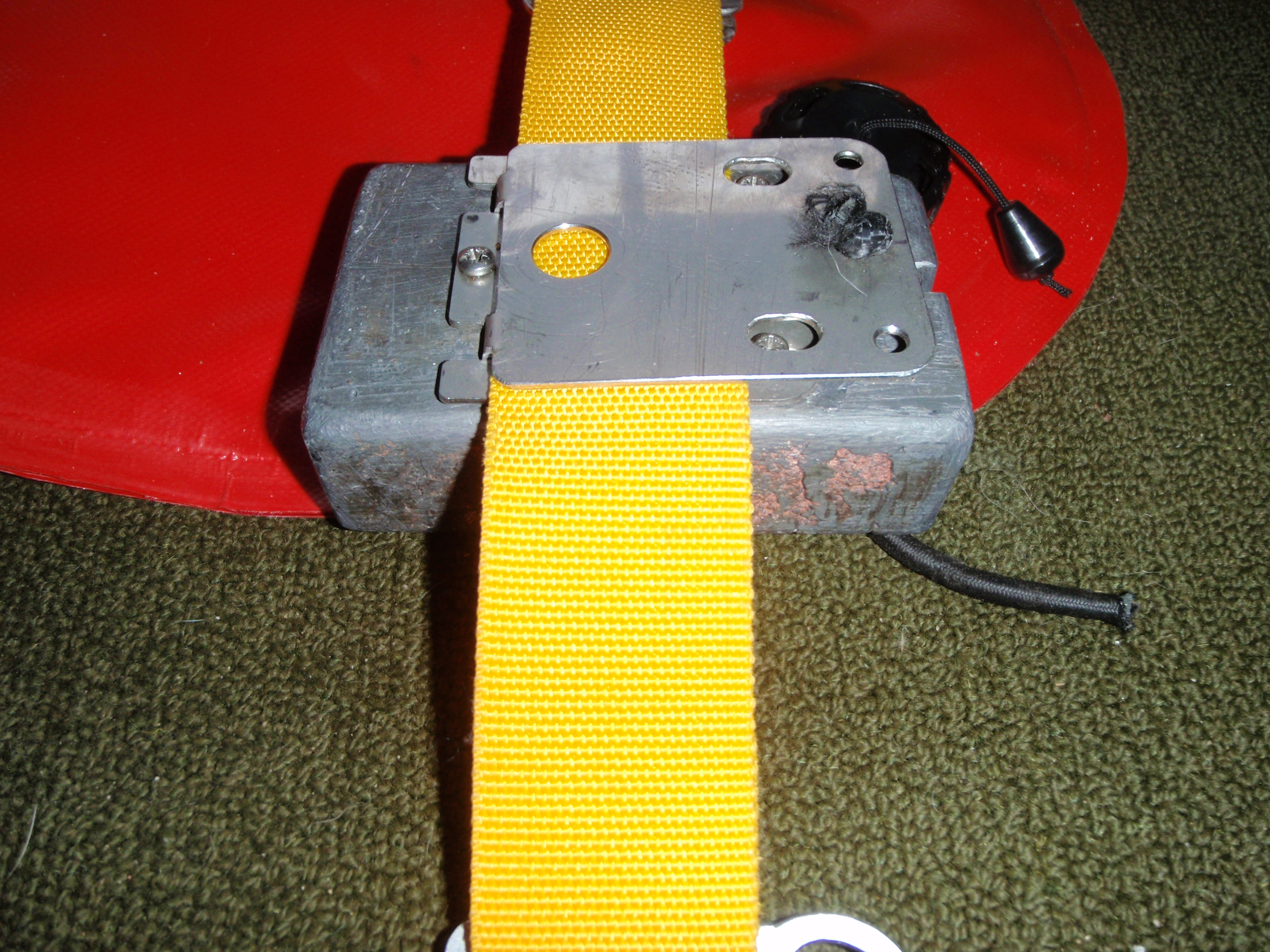
Clip-on monolithic block type main dive weight back view

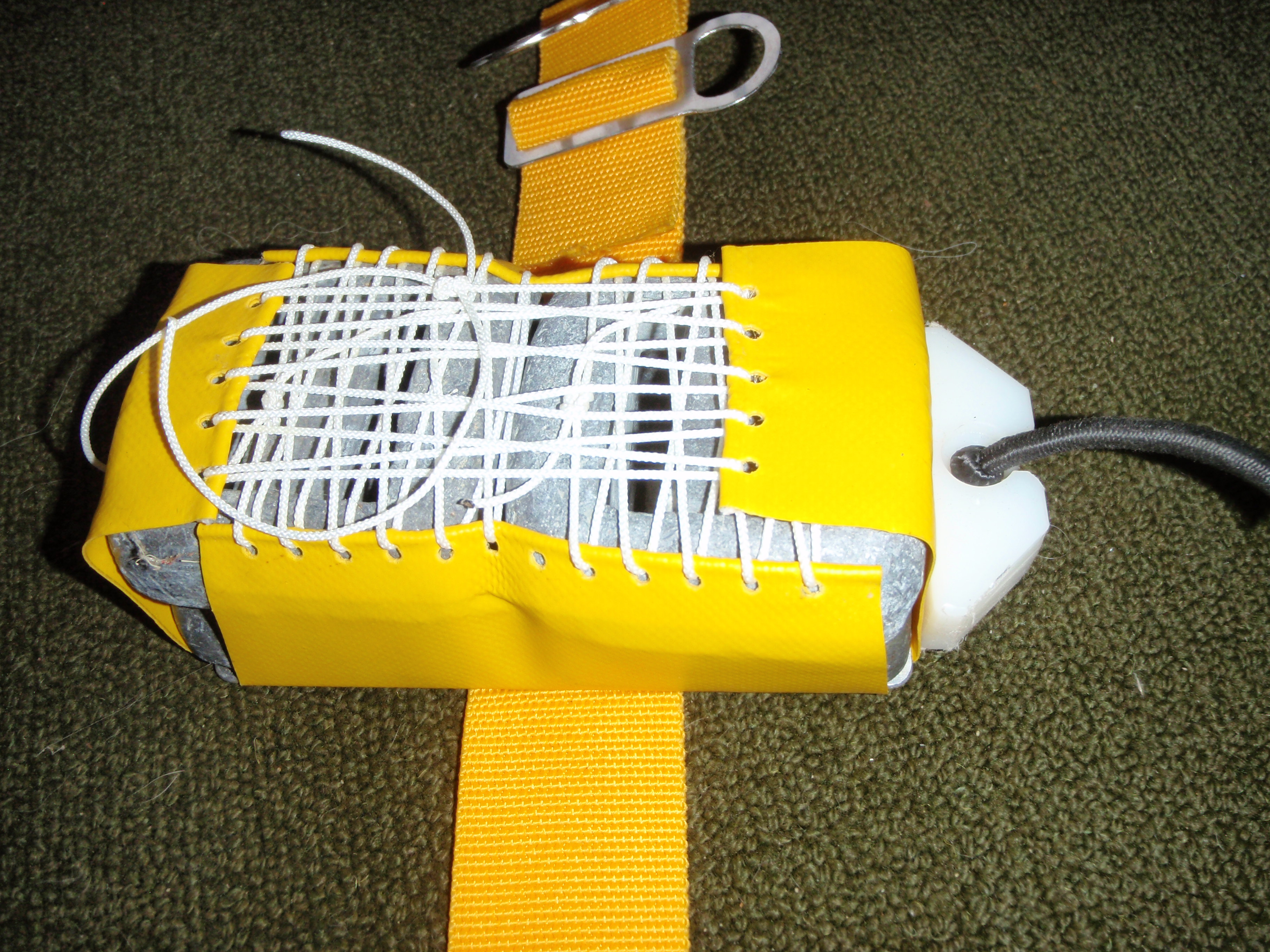
Clip-on assembled main dive weight using a hinged grip plate and shock cord retainer. The support framework is designed to be lightweight for travel and can carry a wide range of standard weight types.

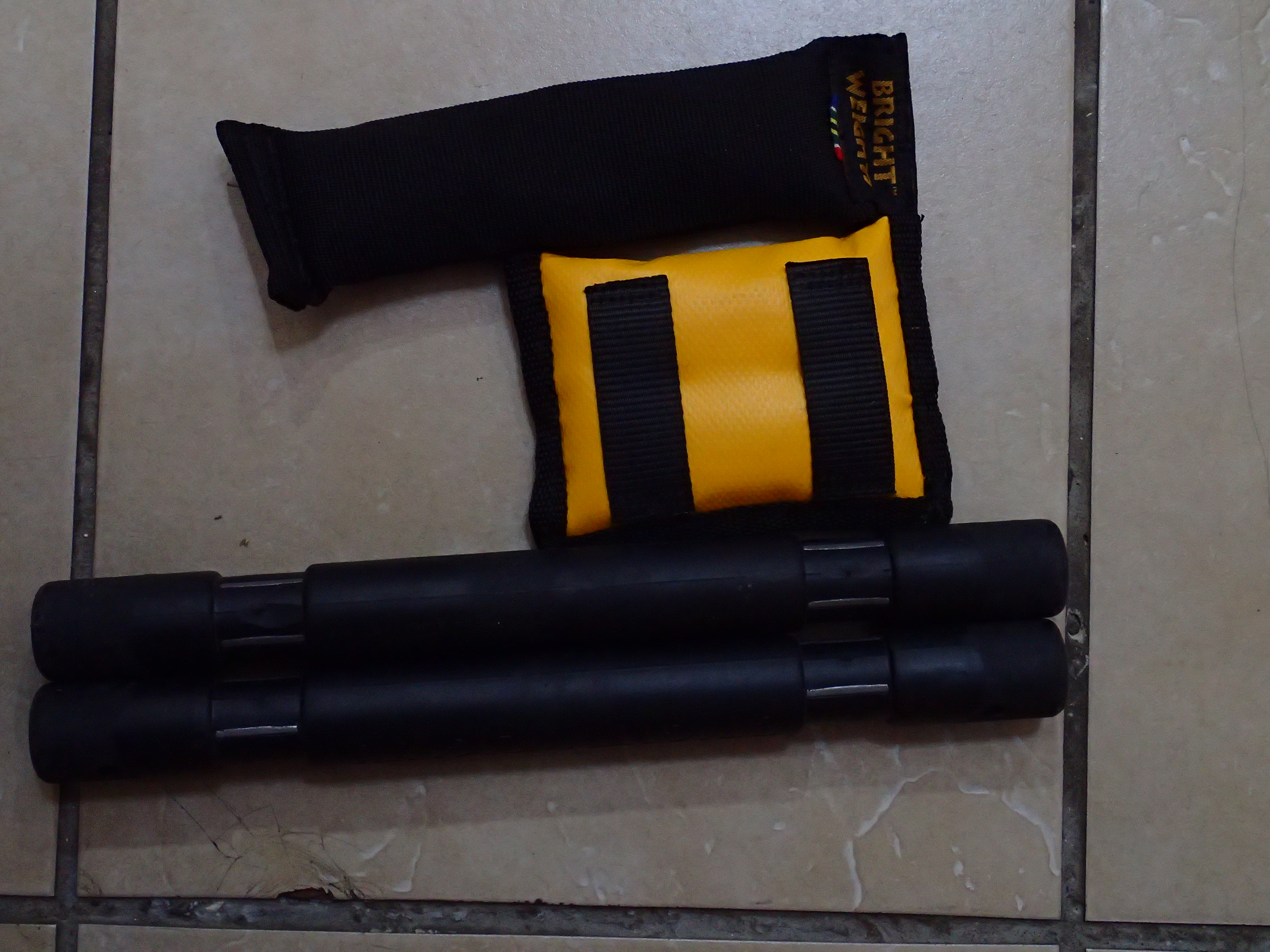
Dive weights - Tubular and rectangular shot bags and cylindrical tank weights

== Hazards ==
There are several operational hazards associated with diving weights:

- Over-weighting leading to inability to ascend or remain at the surface, or difficulties in ascent and buoyancy control. If severe, it may be necessary to ditch weights to get to the surface.
- Under-weighting leading to inability to descend or remain at a required depth. While inability to descend at the start of a dive may be considered an inconvenience, the inability to maintain depth at a required decompression stop at the end of the dive may put the diver at a severe risk of decompression sickness.
- Inability or failure to ditch weight to establish buoyancy in an emergency. In an out of air emergency there may not be gas available to inflate the buoyancy compensator if it has been allowed to be insufficiently inflated. The only option left to reach the surface may be to ditch weights. A similar need may arise at the surface if there is a major loss of buoyancy. Occasionally a diver at the side of the boat will remove the scuba set with buoyancy compensator before passing up their weight belt, and then find it impossible to remain afloat because they are over-weighted. If they fail to grab the boat or ditch the belt the risk of drowning is high.
- Loss of weight at depth at the wrong time. Ditching weights at depth to establish positive buoyancy will generally prevent a properly controlled ascent. The risk of drowning due to running out of breathing gas is exchanged for the risk of decompression sickness. Accidental loss of weights when there is no emergency will cause an emergency if there is a decompression obligation.
- Loss, damage or injury caused by mishandling. When passing the weights to a person on the boat, there is a risk that the weights may be dropped, and may hit the diver, or someone's foot, demand valve, mask or camera, or may drop overboard to be lost, or possibly hit a diver under the boat.
- Discomfort or stress injury related to weight distribution and support. A weight belt hanging from the small of the back of a horizontal diver to counteract suit buoyancy spread over the full length of the diver can cause lower back pain. When walking on land before and after a dive, the weight belt may exert painful pressure on the hip joints.
- Additional work load due to sub-optimal distribution. The work of finning will generally be increased by using ankle weights which must be accelerated for every kick. When this is combined with other effects increasing the workload on the diver, it may cumulatively exceed the work capacity of the diver and result in a positive feedback loop of buildup of carbon dioxide.

Buoyancy and weighting problems have been implicated in a relatively high proportion of scuba diving fatalities. A relatively large number of bodies have been recovered with all weights still in place.

== Materials ==
The most common material for personal dive weights is cast lead. The primary reason for using lead is its high density, as well as its relatively low melting point, low cost and easy availability compared to other high density materials. It is also resistant to corrosion in fresh and salt water. Most dive weights are cast by foundries and sold by dive shops to divers in a range of sizes, but some are made by divers for their own use. Scrap lead from sources such as fishing sinkers and wheel balance weights can be easily cast by a hobbyist in relatively cheap re-usable moulds, though this may expose them to vaporized lead fumes.

=== Heavy metal toxicity ===
Although lead is the least expensive dense (SG=11.34) material available, it is a toxic substance causing biological damage to wildlife and humans. The Centers for Disease Control has stated that no safe level of lead exposure in children has been determined, and that once lead has been absorbed into the body, its effects cannot be corrected. Even a very small amount of exposure causes a permanent reduction in intelligence, ability to focus attention, and academic ability. Lead can be inhaled or ingested as either a metal powder or powdered corrosion products, however most lead salts have very low solubility in water, and pure lead corrodes very slowly in seawater. Absorption through skin is not likely for metallic lead and inorganic corrosion products.

Although it is inexpensive to recycle lead from other sources into homemade dive weights, pure lead melts at 327.46 °C (621.43 °F) and releases fumes at 482 °C (900 °F). The fumes will form oxides in the air and settle as dust on nearby surfaces. Even with good ventilation there will be lead oxide dust in the lead melting area.

Solid block weights can corrode and be damaged when dropped or impacting other weights. In flexible bag weights, the small pieces of lead shot will rub together when handled and used, releasing lead dust and corrosion products into the water. The amount of lead lost to the water is roughly proportional to the total surface area of the weights, and the amount of motion between contact surfaces and is greater for smaller sizes of shot.

Solubility of lead salts in seawater is low, though there is a significant role played by natural organic matter in complexing dissolved lead, and oceanic lead concentrations typically range from 1 to 36 ng/L, with from 50 to 300 ng/L in coastal waters affected by anthropogenic activities.

Diving is also sometimes practiced in swimming pools for training and exercise. Swimming pools can be contaminated by lead weights. Many divers using the same pool with lead weights will over time increase the lead contamination of the pool water until the water is changed.

There are no published studies on lead absorption by divers or diving support personnel due to handling weights, which suggests that it has not been considered a problem by diving medical experts or the occupational health and safety authorities.

=== Alternative materials ===
Other heavy metals have been considered as an alternative to lead. One example is bismuth which has a similar density (SG=9.78) and a low melting point. It is less toxic, and its salts are highly insoluble which limits absorption by the body. Tungsten (SG=19.25) is another possible replacement for lead, but it is very expensive by comparison, both as a material and to manufacture in suitable shapes.

Non-toxic materials such as iron (SG=7.87) can be used in place of lead and would not cause poisoning and contamination. However, the density of most such materials is significantly lower, so the dive weight needs to be of larger volume and therefore greater mass, to equal the negative buoyancy of the mass of lead it replaces. A lead weight of 1 kg would be replaced by an iron weight of 1 × (7.87/11.34) × ((11.34-1)/(7.87-1)) = 1.044 kg, a 4.4% additional load for the diver when out of the water.

Iron is also corroded much more easily in seawater than lead, and would need some form of protection to prevent rusting. Alloys of stainless steel are more resistant to corrosion, but, for the cheaper grades, need to be rinsed with freshwater after use to prevent corrosion in storage. The cost of shaping alternative materials may be considerably greater, particularly for small quantities. Stainless steel and tungsten dive weights for example are currently only obtainable by milling down a solid metal stock material in block or cylinder form, into the required shape. Direct casting of some of these materials in a foundry is possible, but would require high volume production for the casting processes to be cost effective.

=== Encapsulation of lead weights ===
Lead weights can be coated with a protective outer layer such as plastic or paint, and this is commonly used for lead abatement. This prevents the lead from corroding or being ground into dust by rubbing, and helps to cushion impacts. However the protection is reduced if the coating is cracked or otherwise damaged. Soft plastics may become brittle over time due to UV degradation from sunlight and loss of plasticizers, leading to cracking and shattering. Encapsulation materials are usually of near neutral buoyancy in water, and reduce the average density of the weights, making the weights slightly less effective, and increasing the overall weight in air of the diving equipment.

== Ballast on other diving and support equipment ==
- Clump weights for bells and stages:– A clump weight is a large ballast weight suspended from a cable which runs down from one side of the launch and recovery gantry, through a pair of sheaves on the sides of the weight, and up the other side back to the gantry, where it is fastened. The weight hangs freely between the two parts of the cable, and due to its weight, hangs horizontally and keeps the cable under tension with the vertical parts parallel. The bell hangs between the vertical parts of the cable, and has a fairlead on each side which slides along the cable as it is lowered or lifted. Deployment of the bell is by a primary lifting cable attached to the top. As the bell is lowered, the fairleads prevent it from rotating on the deployment cable, which would put twist into the umbilical and risk loops or snagging. The clump weight cables therefore function as guidelines or rails along which the bell is lowered to the workplace, and raised back to the platform.
- Releasable ballast on closed bells, atmospheric diving suits, remotely operated underwater vehicles and submersibles:– Solid weights which can be released by the operator, or automatically release in a power failure, to achieve positive buoyancy in an emergency, allowing the unit to float back to the surface.
- Trim weights on atmospheric diving suits, remotely operated underwater vehicles, and submersibles, used to compensate for variations in payload.
- Ballast and trim weights on camera equipment and diver propulsion vehicles. Camera and light assemblies are often ballasted or provided with rigid buoyancy to provide neutral buoyancy and reasonably stable trim, as this makes it easier to hold the camera in place when setting up a shot. Similar considerations apply to video cameras, which must often be kept steady and in focus for relatively long periods. Diver propulsion vehicles are ballasted to neutral buoyancy and level trim to make it easier to steer them for long periods and at varying speeds, a procedure which is generally done using only one hand, so that the other is available for other work.

== See also ==
- Archimedes' principle – Buoyancy principle in fluid dynamics
- Buoyancy – Upward force that opposes the weight of an object immersed in fluid
- Buoyancy compensator (diving) – Equipment for controlling the buoyancy of a diver
- Emergency ascent – Ascent to the surface by a diver in an emergency
- Human factors in diving equipment design – Influence of the interaction between the user and the equipment on design
